= British Cavalry Corps order of battle 1914 =

The First World War British Cavalry Corps was formed 9 October 1914.

== Command ==
Commander Lieutenant-General Edmund Allenby
Chief of Staff Colonel John Vaughan
Colonel G S Brigadier-General George Barrow
Brigadier-General Royal Artillery B. F. Drake

== 1st Cavalry Division ==
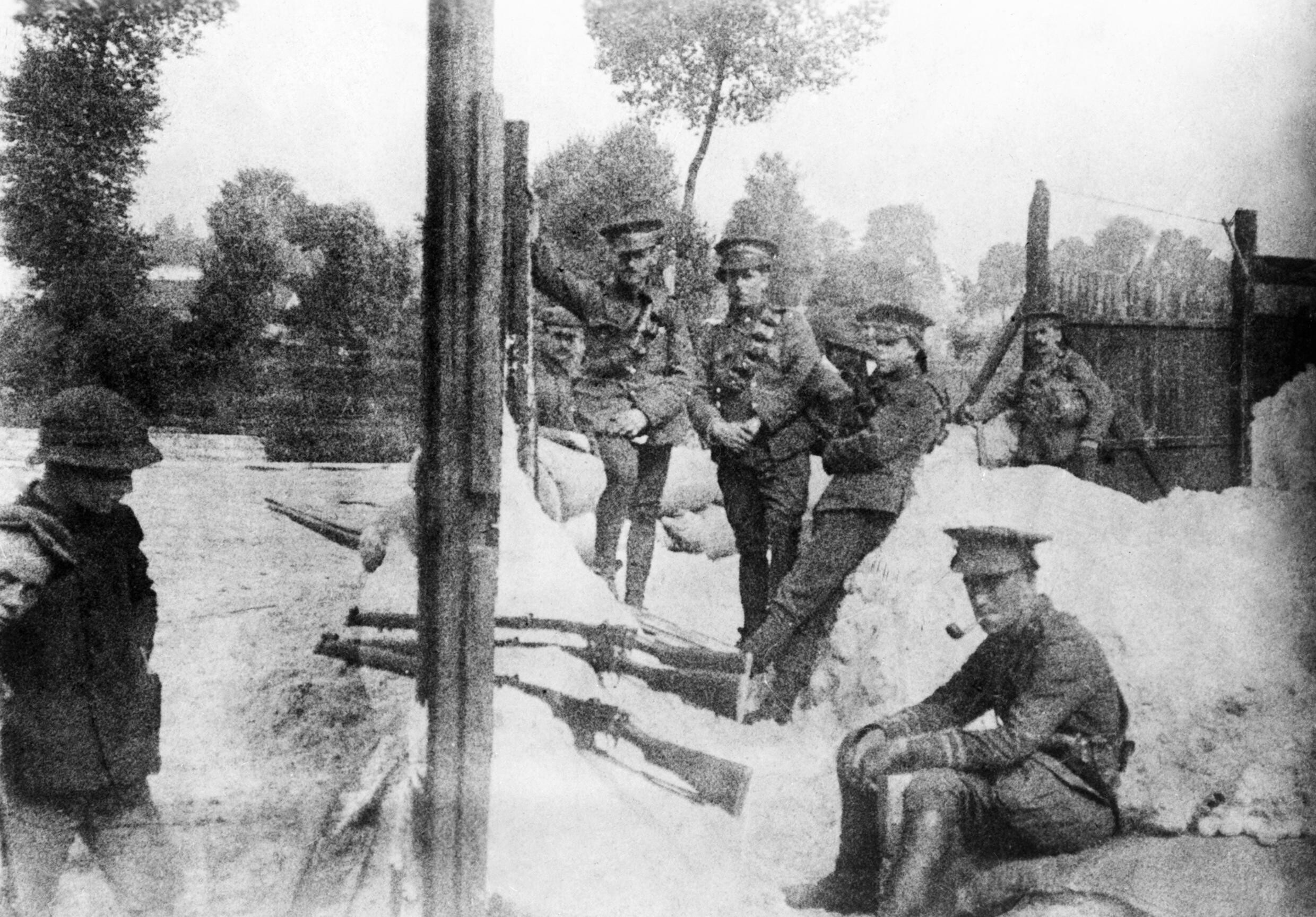
Defensive position built by the 4th (Royal Irish) Dragoon Guards in August 1914

1st Cavalry Division commanded just two brigades until the 9th Cavalry Brigade was formed on 14 April 1915.

Major-General Beauvoir De Lisle
GSO 1 Lieutenant-Colonel A F Home

=== 1st Cavalry Brigade ===
Brigadier-General Charles James Briggs
2nd Dragoon Guards (Queen's Bays)
5th (Princess Charlotte of Wales's) Dragoon Guards
11th (Prince Albert's Own) Hussars
1st Signal Troop

=== 2nd Cavalry Brigade ===
Brigadier-General R L Mullens
4th (Royal Irish) Dragoon Guards
9th (Queen's Royal) Lancers
18th (Queen Mary's Own) Hussars
1/1st Queen's Own Oxfordshire Hussars from 31 October to 11 November
2nd Signal Troop

=== 1st Division troops ===
VII Brigade, Royal Horse Artillery

H Battery, RHA
I Battery, RHA
VII RHA Brigade Ammunition Column

1st Field Squadron Royal Engineers
1st Signal Squadron Royal Engineers
1st Cavalry Division Supply Column Army Service Corps
1st Cavalry Field Ambulance
3rd Cavalry Field Ambulance

== 2nd Cavalry Division ==
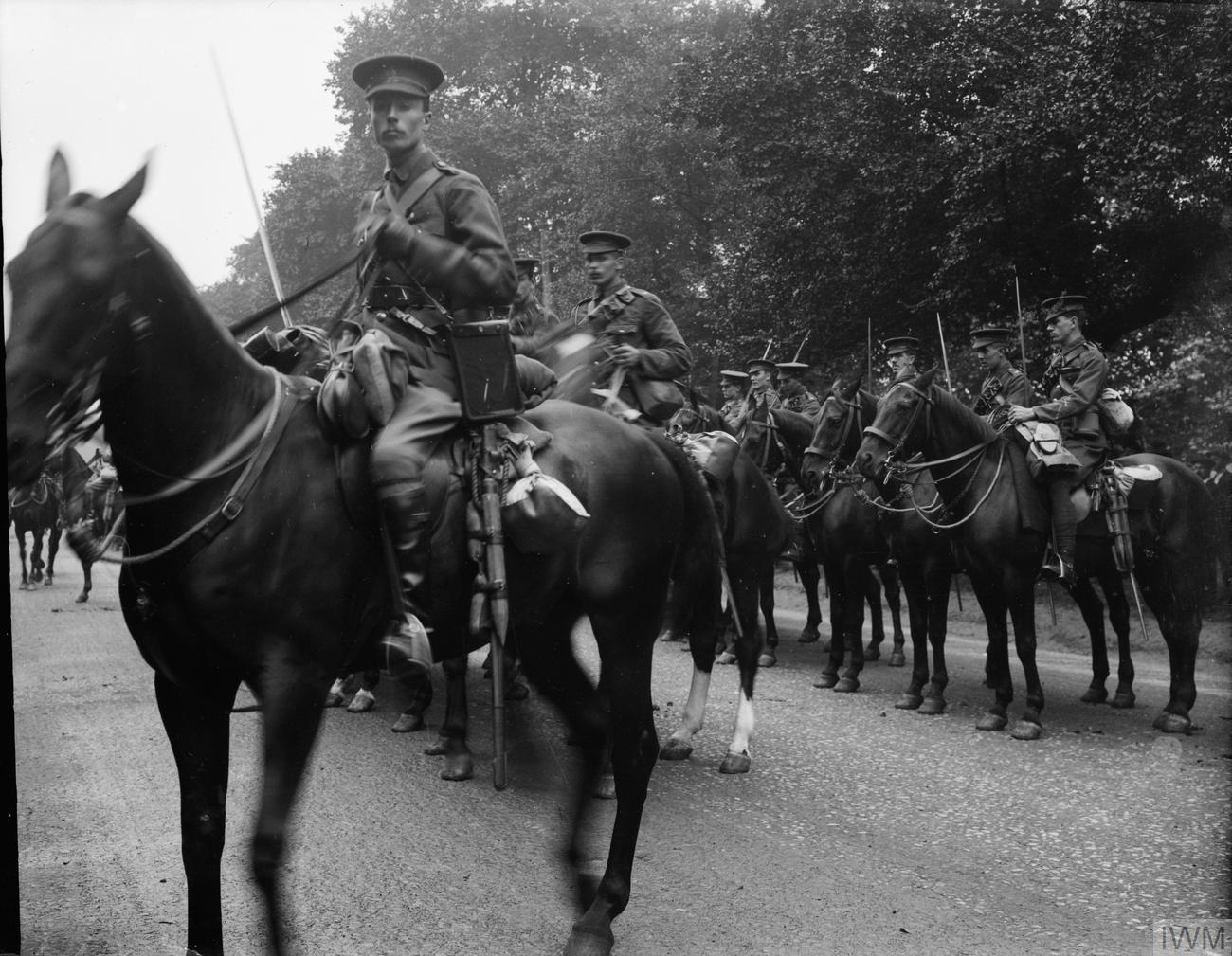
Squadron from the 1st Life Guards August 1914, attached to the Household Cavalry Composite Regiment preparing to leave for France.

Major-General Hubert Gough
GSO 1 Lieutenant-Colonel W H Greenly

=== 3rd Cavalry Brigade ===
Brigadier-General John Vaughan
4th (Queen's Own) Hussars
5th (Royal Irish) Lancers
16th (The Queen's) Lancers
3rd Signal Troop

=== 4th Cavalry Brigade ===
Brigadier-General Cecil Edward Bingham
Household Cavalry Composite Regiment to 11 November
6th Dragoon Guards (Carabiniers)
3rd (King's Own) Hussars
1/1st Queen's Own Oxfordshire Hussars from 11 November
4th Signal Troop

=== 5th Cavalry Brigade ===
Brigadier-General Philip Chetwode
2nd Dragoons (Royal Scots Greys)
12th (Prince of Wales's Royal) Lancers
20th Hussars
5th Signal Troop

=== 2nd Division troops ===
III Brigade, Royal Horse Artillery

D Battery, RHA
E Battery, RHA
J Battery, RHA
III RHA Brigade Ammunition Column

2nd Field Squadron Royal Engineers
2nd Signal Squadron Royal Engineers
2nd Cavalry Division Supply Column Army Service Corps
2nd Cavalry Field Ambulance
4th Cavalry Field Ambulance
5th Cavalry Field Ambulance

== 3rd Cavalry Division ==
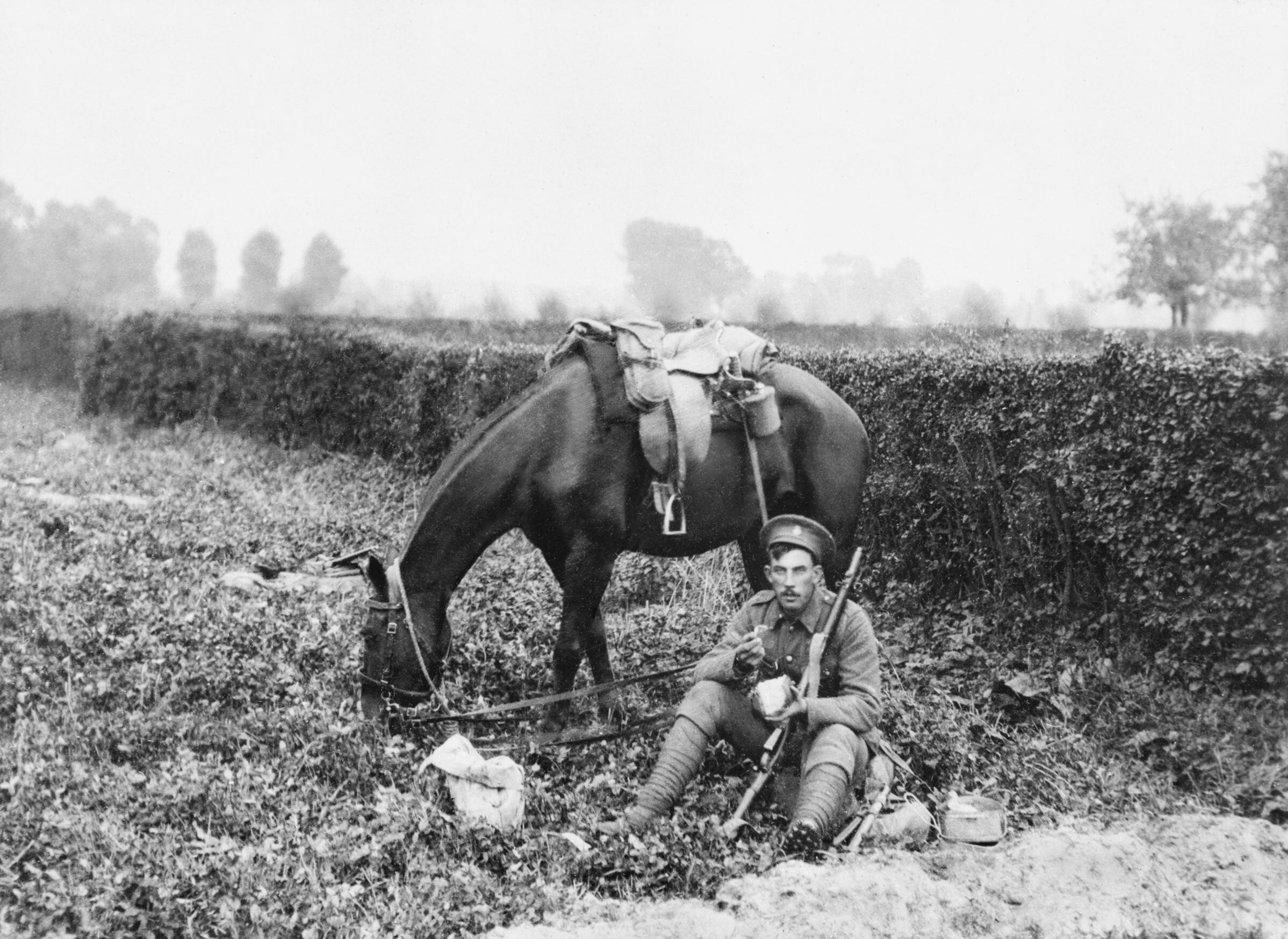
Soldier from the 3rd Cavalry Division in Belgium 13 October 1914

Joined the Cavalry Corps 25 October

Major-General Julian Byng
GSO 1 Lieutenant-Colonel M F Gage
Commander RHA Lieutenant-Colonel C H de Rougemont

=== 6th Cavalry Brigade ===
Brigadier-General Ernest Makins
3rd (Prince of Wales's) Dragoon Guards
1st (Royal) Dragoons
10th (Prince of Wales's Own Royal) Hussars to 20 November
1/1st North Somerset Yeomanry from 13 November

=== 7th Cavalry Brigade ===
Brigadier-General Charles Kavanagh
1st Life Guards
2nd Life Guards
Royal Horse Guards to 20 November
1/1st Leicestershire Yeomanry from 12 November

=== 8th Cavalry Brigade ===
Formed 20 November
Brigadier-General Charles Bulkeley Bulkeley-Johnson
Royal Horse Guards
10th (Prince of Wales's Own Royal) Hussars
1/1st Essex Yeomanry from 10 December

=== 3rd Division troops ===
XV Brigade, Royal Horse Artillery (later renumbered as IV Brigade, RHA)

K Battery, RHA
C Battery, RHA from 19 October
G Battery, RHA from 25 November
XV (later IV) RHA Brigade Ammunition Column

3rd Field Squadron Royal Engineers
3rd Signal Squadron Royal Engineers
3rd Cavalry Division Supply Column
6th Cavalry Field Ambulance
7th Cavalry Field Ambulance

== See also ==
- Indian Cavalry Corps order of battle First World War

== Bibliography ==
- Becke, Archibald F. (1935). Order of Battle of Divisions Part 1–The Regular British Divisions. London: HMSO. OCLC 4405016.
- Edmonds, J.E. (1925). Military Operations France and Belgium, 1914: Antwerp, La Bassée, Armentières, Messines and Ypres October–November 1914. History of the Great War Based on Official Documents by Direction of the Historical Section of the Committee of Imperial Defence. Vol. II (1st ed.). London: Macmillan. ISBN 978-184574717-6. OCLC 220044986.
