= 6th Cavalry Brigade (United Kingdom) =

Inactive British Army unit

- Active: 1815; 1914–1919; 1920–1941
- Country: United Kingdom
- Allegiance: British Crown
- Branch: British Army
- Type: Cavalry
- Size: Brigade
- Part of: 3rd Cavalry Division (First World War); 1st Cavalry Division (Second World War)
- Engagements: Napoleonic Wars Battle of Waterloo First World War Western Front Second World War

Commanders
- Notable commanders: Hussey Vivian, 1st Baron Vivian; Sir David Campbell

The 6th Cavalry Brigade was a cavalry brigade of the British Army. It served in the Napoleonic Wars (notably at the Battle of Waterloo), in the First World War on the Western Front where it was assigned to the 3rd Cavalry Division, and with the 1st Cavalry Division during the Second World War.

== History ==
=== Napoleonic Wars ===
From June 1809, Wellington organized his cavalry into one, later two, cavalry divisions (1st and 2nd) for the Peninsular War. These performed a purely administrative, rather than tactical, role; the normal tactical headquarters were provided by brigades commanding two, later usually three, regiments. The cavalry brigades were named for the commanding officer, rather than numbered. (Note: This could be a source of confusion as brigades acquired new commanders, or they moved between brigades. For example, Fane's Brigade became De Grey's Brigade from 13 May 1810 when Henry Fane went to Estremadura; De Grey's Brigade was broken up 29 January 1812. On 20 May 1813, Fane took over Slade's Brigade; the second Fane's Brigade was unrelated to the original one although coincidentally, and to add to the potential confusion, the 3rd Dragoon Guards served in both.) For the Hundred Days Campaign, he numbered his British cavalry brigades in a single sequence, 1st to 7th. (Note: The British cavalry included five regiments of the King's German Legion.) The 6th Cavalry Brigade consisted of:

- 10th (Prince of Wales's Own) Regiment of (Light) Dragoons (Hussars)
- 18th (King's Irish) Regiment of (Light) Dragoons (Hussars)
- 1st Hussars, King's German Legion

It was commanded by Major General Sir Hussey Vivian.

The brigade took part in the Battle of Waterloo. During the battle, the 1st Hussars, KGL suffered just 7 casualties (1 killed, 6 wounded), the 10th Hussars 94 (22 killed, 46 wounded, 26 missing) and the 18th Hussars 102 (12 killed, 73 wounded, 17 missing). This represented a loss rate of about 13%. (Note: 1st Hussars, KGL had a strength of 605, 10th Hussars 452, and 18th Hussars 447.)

=== First World War ===
==== Formation ====
The brigade was formed on 19 September 1914 at Ludgershall, Wiltshire for the 3rd Cavalry Division. It commanded three regular British Army cavalry regiments, the only ones not stationed in the United Kingdom or India at the outbreak of the war. (Note: In August 1914, the regular British Army cavalry comprised 31 regiments. 19 regiments were in the United Kingdom, nine in India, two in South Africa and one with the Force in Egypt.) A Royal Engineers signal troop also joined on formation.

The 1st Dragoons joined the brigade on 19 September and the 10th Hussars on 22 September, both from Potchefstroom, South Africa. The 3rd Dragoon Guards from the Force in Egypt did not join the brigade in Belgium until 4 November.

The brigade landed at Ostend on 8 October 1914 and deployed to the Western Front in France and Belgium. C Battery, Royal Horse Artillery (six 13 pounders) joined the division's Royal Horse Artillery Brigade from XIV Brigade, RHA of 7th Division on 19 October and was permanently attached to 6th Cavalry Brigade on the same day. On 29 February 1916, a Machine Gun Squadron was formed from the machine gun sections of the brigade's constituent regiments.

The 3rd Cavalry Division was initially formed with just two cavalry brigades – the 6th and 7th. To bring the division up to the standard strength of three brigades, the 8th Cavalry Brigade was formed in Belgium on 20 November 1914. The 10th Hussars was transferred to the new brigade on formation and was replaced by the 1/1st North Somerset Yeomanry from the 1st South Western Mounted Brigade in England.

==== Chronicle ====
The brigade served with the 3rd Cavalry Division on the Western Front until the end of the war. In 1914, the division saw action in the defence of Antwerp (9 and 10 October) and the First Battle of Ypres, notably the battles of Langemarck (21–24 October), Gheluvelt (29–31 October) and Nonne Bosschen (11 November). In 1915, it took part in the Second Battle of Ypres (Battle of Frezenberg Ridge, 11–13 May) and the Battle of Loos (26–28 September). 1916 saw no notable actions, but in 1917 the division saw action in the Battle of Arras (First Battle of the Scarpe, 9–12 April). At other times, the brigade formed a dismounted unit and served in the trenches (as a regiment under the command of the brigadier).

1918 saw the return of the war of movement and the division took part in the First Battle of the Somme notably the Battle of St Quentin (21–23 March), Actions of the Somme Crossings (24 and 25 March) and Battle of the Avre (4 and 5 April); the Battle of Amiens and the battles of the Hindenburg Line (Battle of Cambrai, 8 and 9 October and the Pursuit to the Selle, 9–12 October). Its final action was in the Advance in Flanders (9–11 November).

At the Armistice, units of the division had reached the River Dender at Leuze and Lessines in Belgium, when orders were received that they would cover the advance of the Second Army into Germany. They started the advance on 17 November, divisional headquarters being established at Waterloo on 21 November. Transport difficulties meant that the only one cavalry division could advance with Second Army so the following winter was spent in Belgium. By 31 March 1919, the division was demobilized.

==== Order of battle ====
Unit	From	To
3rd (Prince Of Wales’s) Dragoon Guards	4 November 1914	
1st (Royal) Dragoons	19 September 1914	
10th (Prince Of Wales’s Own Royal) Hussars	22 September 1914	20 November 1914 (Note: 10th Hussars transferred to 8th Cavalry Brigade.)
10th (Prince Of Wales’s Own Royal) Hussars	12 March 1918 (Note: 10th Hussars returned from 8th Cavalry Brigade in exchange for the 1/1st North Somerset Yeomanry.)	
1/1st North Somerset Yeomanry	13 November 1914	13 March 1918
1/1st North Somerset Yeomanry	April 1918 (Note: 1/1st North Somerset Yeomanry was originally slated to become a cyclist unit, then to form a machine gun battalion with the 1/1st Leicestershire Yeomanry. The German spring offensive forestalled this plan, and the regiment was remounted and returned to 3rd Cavalry Division. From April 1918 it was split up with a squadron joining each regiment in 6th Cavalry Brigade (3rd Dragoon Guards, 1st Dragoons and 10th Hussars).)	
C Battery, RHA	19 October 1914	
6th Signal Troop Royal Engineers	19 September 1914	
6th Cavalry Brigade Machine Gun Squadron, MGC	28 February 1916	

=== Second World War ===
The 6th Cavalry Brigade was a pre-war First Line Territorial Army cavalry brigade re-formed in 1920. On the outbreak of the war, it was part of Western Command and commanded the Warwickshire, Staffordshire and Cheshire Yeomanry regiments. It joined the 1st Cavalry Division when it was formed on 31 October 1939.

With the 1st Cavalry Division, the 6th Cavalry Brigade departed the United Kingdom in December 1939, transited across France, and arrived in Palestine on 9 January 1940. It served as a garrison force under British Forces, Palestine and Trans-Jordan.

On 1 August 1941, the division was converted into the 10th Armoured Division and the 6th Cavalry Brigade into the 8th Armoured Brigade. 8th Armoured Brigade would later take part in the Second Battle of El Alamein and land at Gold Beach on D Day.

==== Order of battle ====
Unlike in the First World War, when brigade compositions rarely changed, there was considerable movement of units between the 4th, 5th and 6th Cavalry Brigades in the Second World War.

Unit	From	To
Warwickshire Yeomanry	3 September 1939	21 March 1941 (Note: Warwickshire Yeomanry transferred to 4th Cavalry Brigade.)
Staffordshire Yeomanry	3 September 1939	28 April 1941 (Note: Staffordshire Yeomanry transferred to, and returned from, 5th Cavalry Brigade.)
Staffordshire Yeomanry	5 June 1941	31 July 1941
Cheshire Yeomanry	3 September 1939	20 March 1941 (Note: Cheshire Yeomanry transferred to 5th Cavalry Brigade.)
Royal Wiltshire Yeomanry	3 October 1940 (Note: Royal Wiltshire Yeomanry joined from, and returned to, 4th Cavalry Brigade.)	7 January 1941
Royal Scots Greys	1 March 1941 (Note: Royal Scots Greys joined from Force Troops, British Forces in Palestine and Trans-Jordan.)	31 July 1941
Yorkshire Hussars	23 March 1941 (Note: Yorkshire Hussars joined from 5th Cavalry Brigade.)	31 July 1941

Of the three regiments with the brigade when it was converted to an armoured formation:

- the Royal Scots Greys converted into an Armoured Regiment in 8th Armoured Brigade.
- the Yorkshire Hussars converted into an Armoured Regiment in 9th Armoured Brigade (former 4th Cavalry Brigade). It remained in the Middle East until 1943 when it returned to the UK.
- the Staffordshire Yeomanry converted into an Armoured Regiment in 8th Armoured Brigade. It fought in the Second Battle of El Alamein before returning to England. It landed in Normandy on D Day (6 June 1944) and fought throughout the North West Europe Campaign.

== Commanders ==
The 6th Cavalry Brigade had the following commanders during the First World War:

From	Rank	Name
21 September 1914	Brigadier-General	E. Makins (sick, 7 November 1914)
7 November 1914	Lieutenant-Colonel	O.B.B. Smith-Bingham (acting)
9 November 1914	Brigadier-General	D.G.M. Campbell
19 April 1915	Lieutenant-Colonel	O.B.B. Smith-Bingham (acting)
4 May 1915	Brigadier-General	D.G.M. Campbell
23 May 1916	Brigadier-General	A.E.W. Harman
17 October 1917	Lieutenant-Colonel	A. Burt (acting)
8 December 1917	Brigadier-General	A.E.W. Harman
14 March 1918	Brigadier-General	A.G. Seymour (sick, 8 August 1918)
8 August 1918	Lieutenant-Colonel	F.H.D.C. Whitmore (acting)
15 August 1918	Lieutenant-Colonel	E. Paterson (acting)
2 September 1918	Brigadier-General	E. Paterson

The 6th Cavalry Brigade had the following commanders during the Second World War:

From	Rank	Name
3 September 1939	Brigadier	H.O. Wiley
18 May 1940	Brigadier	J.I. Chrystall
27 February 1941	Lieutenant-Colonel	P.L.M. Wright (acting)
10 May 1941	Lieutenant-Colonel	G.H.N. Todd (acting)
18 May 1941	Brigadier	L.S. Lloyd

== See also ==
- Order of battle of the Waterloo Campaign
- British Army during World War I
- British Cavalry Corps order of battle 1914
- British cavalry during the First World War
- British Army Order of Battle (September 1939)
- List of British brigades of the Second World War

== Bibliography ==
- Becke, Archibald F. (1935). Order of Battle of Divisions Part 1–The Regular British Divisions. London: HMSO. OCLC 4405016.
- Bellis, Malcolm A. (1994). Regiments of the British Army 1939–1945 (Armour & Infantry). London: Military Press International. ISBN 0-85420-999-9.
- Bickersteth, Lt-Col. J. B. (1920). History Of The 6th Cavalry Brigade 1914-1919. London: The Bayard Press (Sanders Phillips & Co., Limited).
- Haythornthwaite, Philip J. (1990). The Napoleonic Source Book. London: Guild Publishing.
- James, Brigadier E.A. (1978). British Regiments 1914–18. London: Samson Books Limited. ISBN 0-906304-03-2.
- Joslen, H. F. (2003) [1960]. Orders of Battle: Second World War, 1939–1945. Uckfield, East Sussex: Naval and Military Press. ISBN 978-1-84342-474-1.
- Mileham, Patrick (1994). The Yeomanry Regiments; 200 Years of Tradition. Edinburgh: Canongate Academic. ISBN 1-898410-36-4.
- Reid, Stuart (2004). Wellington's Army in the Peninsula 1809–14. Vol. 2 of Battle Orders Series. Oxford: Osprey Publishing. ISBN 1-84176-517-1.
- Smith, Digby (1998). The Greenhill Napoleonic Wars Data Book. London: Greenhill Books. ISBN 1-85367-276-9.
