= 4th Regiment Royal Artillery =

British Army artillery regiment

4th Regiment Royal Horse Artillery 4th Regiment Royal Artillery
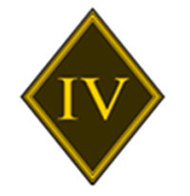
- Active: 31 May 1939 – present
- Allegiance: United Kingdom
- Branch: British Army
- Type: Artillery Regiment
- Role: Field artillery
- Size: 6 Batteries; 489 personnel
- Garrison/HQ: Alanbrooke Barracks, North Yorkshire
- Nicknames: The North East Gunners; The Fighting Fourth
- Colors: Black & Gold
- Equipment: L118 light gun
- Website: 4 Regiment Royal Artillery

The 4th Regiment Royal Artillery is a regiment of the Royal Artillery in the British Army. It was formed in 1939 as 4th Regiment Royal Horse Artillery, before being redesignated in 1961.

It is currently based at Alanbrooke Barracks in Topcliffe and serves in the light close support role, equipped with 105mm L118 light guns supporting 7 Light Mechanised Brigade Combat Team. The regiment is part of NATO's Very High Readiness Joint Task Force (Land).

== History ==
In 1939, the regiment was formed as 4th Regiment Royal Horse Artillery (RHA) at Helmieh, Egypt on 28 May 1939. The original batteries were C Battery, F (Sphinx) Battery, and G Battery (Mercer's Troop), drawn from independent commands in India, and equipped with the Ordnance QF 25 pounder. During the Battle of Sidi Rezegh in the Western Desert on 23 November 1941, Brigadier John Charles Campbell, who only a few months earlier had been commanding 4th RHA, won the Victoria Cross.

After World War Two, in 1947, 4th Regiment RHA was based in Germany at Dorset Barracks in Kiel. By 1948, the regiment moved to Alma Barracks at Blackdown Camp and in 1951, the regiment moved to Barracks at Hohne. In 1961, the regiment became 4th Regiment, Royal Artillery, with three batteries moving to 33rd Parachute Light Regiment Royal Artillery, which immediately became 7th Parachute Regiment Royal Horse Artillery. 4th Regiment RA gained 29 (Corunna), 88 (Arracan) and 97 Battery (Lawson's Company) as gun batteries and was posted to Hong Kong.

In 1965, the regiment deployed on operations to the Malayan Peninsula. It saw active service from February to April and during the confrontation with Indonesia in Borneo until November. By 1966, the regiment resumed service in West Germany, moving to Munsterlager in support of 1st Division (renamed the 1st Armoured Division in the 1970s). Across the 1970s, the regiment served three emergency tours in Northern Ireland in 1971/1972, 1974, and 1976. In 1977, the regiment relieved 7th RHA in Aldershot in support of 6 Field Force and equipped with the 105mm Light Gun adopted the parachute role. In 1981, 29 (Corunna) Battery deployed to Long Kesh (HMP Maze) in Northern Ireland.

In 1982, two gun batteries and the regimental HQ (RHQ), with mortar locating radar and intelligence sections, deployed to retake the Falkland Islands.

In 1984, the regiment moved to Osnabrück and was equipped with the M109 155mm Self-propelled gun, remaining in support of the 1st Armoured Division and in 1986, 88 (Arracan) Battery deployed to Long Kesh (HMP Maze) in Northern Ireland. By 1991, the regiment undertook an emergency tour of Northern Ireland as the Tyrone Roulement Battalion. In 1994, it deployed to Belfast, Northern Ireland. Equipped with the AS90 gun and returning to Osnabruck in 1997, batteries of the regiment deployed to Bosnia and Herzegovina.

In 2004, parts of the regiment deployed to Iraq for Operation TELIC 5, where they were involved in the reconstruction of Basra. Two years later, the regiment deployed on Operation TOSCA on peacekeeping duties as part of the United Nations Peacekeeping Force in Cyprus (UNFICYP). In 2007, the regiment began its conversion to the 105mm Light Gun and then deployed for Operation HERRICK 7 in Afghanistan. Later, in 2008, the regiment moved from Osnabrück to Topcliffe. It deployed on Operation HERRICK 12 in Afghanistan in 2010 and in 2012, the regiment returned to Afghanistan for the final time for Operation HERRICK 17.

Under the initial Army 2020 reforms, the regiment was placed under Force Troops Command (now 6th (UK) Division) and tasked to support the Adaptable Force. The regiment's Army Reserve pairing is with 103 Regiment RA, based in the north west of England.

In 2019, the regiment was deployed to the Republic of Cyprus as part of the army's Operation Tosca; the deployment was part of the wider Operation Tosca 30.

In 2020, the regiment assisted with the construction of NHS Nightingale Hospital Yorkshire and the Humber, a temporary critical care hospital, during the COVID-19 pandemic in the United Kingdom.

== Current sub-units ==
The regiment consists of:

- 3/29 (Corunna) Battery Royal Artillery — L118 light gun battery
- 6/36 (Arcot 1751) Battery Royal Artillery — L118 light gun battery
- 88 (Arracan) Battery Royal Artillery — L118 light gun battery
- 94 (New Zealand) Battery Royal Artillery — Headquarters battery
- 97 Battery (Lawson's Company) Royal Artillery — Tactical Group battery
- 129 (Dragon) Battery Royal Artillery — Tactical Group battery

== Bibliography ==
- Clarke, W.G. (1993). Horse Gunners: The Royal Horse Artillery, 200 Years of Panache and Professionalism. Woolwich: The Royal Artillery Institution. ISBN 09520762-0-9.
