= 7th Cavalry Brigade (United Kingdom) =

- Active: 1815; 1914–1919
- Country: United Kingdom
- Branch: British Army
- Type: Cavalry
- Size: Brigade
- Part of: 3rd Cavalry Division
- Engagements: Napoleonic Wars Battle of Waterloo World War I Western Front

Commanders
- Notable commanders: Charles Kavanagh

The 7th Cavalry Brigade was a cavalry brigade of the British Army. It served in the Napoleonic Wars, notably at the Battle of Waterloo. It was reformed in 1914 and served on the Western Front as part of the 3rd Cavalry Division until the end of World War I.

== Napoleonic Wars ==
From June 1809, Wellington organized his cavalry into one, later two, cavalry divisions (1st and 2nd) for the Peninsular War. These performed a purely administrative, rather than tactical, role; the normal tactical headquarters were provided by brigades commanding two, later usually three, regiments. The cavalry brigades were named for the commanding officer, rather than numbered. (Note: This could be a source of confusion as brigades acquired new commanders, or they moved between brigades. For example, Fane's Brigade became De Grey's Brigade from 13 May 1810 when Henry Fane went to Estremadura; De Grey's Brigade was broken up 29 January 1812. On 20 May 1813, Fane took over Slade's Brigade; the second Fane's Brigade was unrelated to the original one although coincidentally, and to add to the potential confusion, the 3rd Dragoon Guards served in both.) For the Hundred Days Campaign, he numbered his British cavalry brigades in a single sequence, 1st to 7th. (Note: The British cavalry included five regiments of the King's German Legion.) The 7th Cavalry Brigade consisted of:

- 13th Regiment of Light Dragoons
- 3rd Hussars, King's German Legion

It was commanded by Colonel Sir Friedrich von Arentschildt.

The brigade took part in the Battle of Waterloo, though the 13th Light Dragoons was detached to the 5th Cavalry Brigade. Stationed to the rear of the infantry squares, it helped to fend off Ney's massed cavalry attacks from 4pm onwards. During the battle, the Hussars suffered 130 casualties (44 killed, 86 wounded) and the Light Dragoons 108 (12 killed, 78 wounded, 18 missing). This represented a loss rate of about 20%. (Note: 3rd Hussars, KGL had a strength of 712, 13th Light Dragoons 455.)

== World War I ==
=== Formation ===
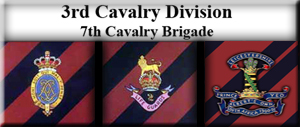
1st Life Guards, 2nd Life Guards and Leicestershire Yeomanry which made up the 7th Cavalry Brigade for the majority of its existence in World War I.

The brigade was formed on 1 September 1914 at Ludgershall, Wiltshire for the 3rd Cavalry Division. It commanded the three Household Cavalry regiments, the only regular cavalry regiments remaining in the United Kingdom after mobilization of the BEF and its transport to France. (Note: In August 1914, the regular British Army cavalry comprised 31 regiments. 19 regiments were in the United Kingdom, nine in India, two in South Africa and one with the Force in Egypt. The BEF mobilized with five cavalry brigades of three regiments each, plus two regiments employed as divisional cavalry squadrons, for a total of 17 regiments. The Household Cavalry Composite Regiment was formed as the 17th regiment.) A Royal Engineers signal troop also joined on formation.

The 1st Life Guards joined from Hyde Park, the 2nd Life Guards from Regent's Park and the Royal Horse Guards from Windsor. Each regiment only consisted of two squadrons as each had provided a squadron to the Household Cavalry Composite Regiment in 4th Cavalry Brigade in August 1914. The detached squadrons did not rejoin their parent regiments until 11 November 1914.

The brigade landed at Zeebrugge on 7 October 1914 and deployed to the Western Front in France and Belgium. K Battery, Royal Horse Artillery (six 13 pounders) joined the division's Royal Horse Artillery Brigade from VI Brigade, RHA at Christchurch on 1 October and was permanently attached to 7th Cavalry Brigade on 16 October. On 29 February 1916, a Machine Gun Squadron was formed from the machine gun sections of the brigade's constituent regiments.

The 3rd Cavalry Division was initially formed with just two cavalry brigades – the 6th and 7th. To bring the division up to the standard strength of three brigades, the 8th Cavalry Brigade was formed in Belgium on 20 November 1914. The Royal Horse Guards was transferred to the new brigade on 21 November and was replaced by the 1/1st Leicestershire Yeomanry from the North Midland Mounted Brigade in England.

=== Reconstituted ===
In March 1918, the 4th (formerly 1st Indian) and 5th (formerly 2nd Indian) Cavalry Divisions were broken up in France. The Indian elements were sent to Egypt where they formed part of the new 4th and 5th Cavalry Divisions which played a major part in the successful conclusion of the Sinai and Palestine Campaign. The British and Canadian units remained in France and most of them were transferred to the 3rd Cavalry Division causing it to be extensively reorganized.

The Household Cavalry regiments were concentrated in the 7th Cavalry Brigade; they left the brigade on 10 March when they were dismounted and converted to machine gunners as No. 1 (1st Life Guards), No. 2 (2nd Life Guards) and No. 3 (Royal Horse Guards) Battalions of the Guards Machine Gun Regiment at Étaples. They were replaced in the brigade on the same day by 7th Dragoon Guards, 6th (Inniskilling) Dragoons and 17th Lancers.

=== Chronicle ===
The brigade served with the 3rd Cavalry Division on the Western Front until the end of the war. In 1914, the division saw action in the defence of Antwerp (9 and 10 October) and the First Battle of Ypres, notably the battles of Langemarck (21–24 October), Gheluvelt (29–31 October) and Nonne Bosschen (11 November). In 1915, it took part in the Second Battle of Ypres (Battle of Frezenberg Ridge, 11–13 May) and the Battle of Loos (26–28 September). 1916 saw no notable actions, but in 1917 the division saw action in the Battle of Arras (First Battle of the Scarpe, 9–12 April). At other times, the brigade formed a dismounted unit and served in the trenches (as a regiment under the command of the brigadier).

1918 saw the return of the war of movement and the division took part in the First Battle of the Somme notably the Battle of St Quentin (21–23 March), Actions of the Somme Crossings (24 and 25 March) and Battle of the Avre (4 and 5 April); the Battle of Amiens and the battles of the Hindenburg Line (Battle of Cambrai, 8 and 9 October and the Pursuit to the Selle, 9–12 October). From 4 November, the Cavalry were involved at the Canal de Sambre over the River Scheldt. Its final action was in the Advance in Flanders (9–11 November).

At the Armistice, units of the division had reached the River Dender at Leuze and Lessines in Belgium, when orders were received that they would cover the advance of the Second Army into Germany. They started the advance on 17 November, divisional headquarters being established at Waterloo on 21 November. Transport difficulties meant that the only one cavalry division could advance with Second Army so the following winter was spent in Belgium. By 31 March 1919, the division was demobilized.

=== Units ===
| Unit | From | To |
|---|---|---|
| 1st Life Guards | 1 September 1914 | 10 March 1918 (Note: 1st Life Guards dismounted and converted to machine gunners as No. 1 (1st Life Guards) Battalion, Guards Machine Gun Regiment.) |
| 2nd Life Guards | 1 September 1914 | 10 March 1918 (Note: 2nd Life Guards dismounted and converted to machine gunners as No. 2 (2nd Life Guards) Battalion, Guards Machine Gun Regiment.) |
| Royal Horse Guards | 1 September 1914 | 21 November 1914 (Note: Royal Horse Guards transferred to 8th Cavalry Brigade.) |
| Royal Horse Guards | 7 November 1917 (Note: Royal Horse Guards returned from 8th Cavalry Brigade in exchange for the 1/1st Leicestershire Yeomanry.) | 10 March 1918 (Note: Royal Horse Guards dismounted and converted to machine gunners as No. 3 (Royal Horse Guards) Battalion, Guards Machine Gun Regiment.) |
| 1/1st Leicestershire Yeomanry | 12 November 1914 | 7 November 1917 |
| 7th (Princess Royal’s) Dragoon Guards | 10 March 1918 (Note: 7th Dragoon Guards joined from 9th (Secunderabad) Cavalry Brigade of the 5th Cavalry Division after it was broken up. On 11 March it came on the British War Establishment i.e. the 4th squadron was absorbed into the others.) | |
| 6th (Inniskilling) Dragoons | 10 March 1918 (Note: 6th Dragoons joined from 5th (Mhow) Cavalry Brigade of the 4th Cavalry Division after it was broken up. On 11 March it came on the British War Establishment (reformed into 3 squadrons).) | |
| 17th (Duke Of Cambridge’s Own) Lancers | 10 March 1918 (Note: 17th Lancers joined from 2nd (Sialkot) Cavalry Brigade of the 4th Cavalry Division after it was broken up. On 11 March it came on the British War Establishment (reformed into 3 squadrons).) | |
| K Battery, RHA | 16 October 1914 | |
| 7th Signal Troop Royal Engineers | 1 September 1914 | |
| 7th Cavalry Brigade Machine Gun Squadron, MGC | 28 February 1916 | 14 April 1918 (Note: 7th Cavalry Brigade Machine Gun Squadron was broken up with the officers and men returning to the Household Cavalry regiments.) |
| 8th Cavalry Brigade Machine Gun Squadron, MGC | 11 March 1918 (Note: 8th Cavalry Brigade Machine Gun Squadron transferred from 8th Cavalry Brigade. Redesignated 7th Cavalry Brigade Machine Gun Squadron on 4 May 1918.) | |

== Commanders ==
The 7th Cavalry Brigade had the following commanders:

| From | Rank | Name |
|---|---|---|
| 10 September 1914 | Brigadier-General | C.T.McM. Kavanagh |
| 19 April 1915 | Colonel | A.F.H. Ferguson (acting) |
| 4 May 1915 | Brigadier-General | A.A. Kennedy |
| 9 November 1916 | Lieutenant-Colonel | E.H. Brassey (acting) |
| 11 November 1916 | Brigadier-General | B.P. Portal |
| 17 April 1918 | Brigadier-General | A. Burt (sick, 16 July 1918) |
| 16 July 1918 | Lieutenant-Colonel | F. Paterson (acting) |
| 15 August 1918 | Lieutenant-Colonel | R. Sparrow (acting) |
| 17 August 1918 | Brigadier-General | A. Burt |

== See also ==
- Order of battle of the Waterloo Campaign
- British Army during World War I
- British Cavalry Corps order of battle 1914
- British cavalry during the First World War

== Bibliography ==
- Becke, Major A.F. (1935). Order of Battle of Divisions Part 1. The Regular British Divisions. London: His Majesty's Stationery Office. OCLC 493146210.
- Hamilton-Williams, David (1999). Waterloo New Perspectives. Brockhampton Press. ISBN 1-86019-996-8.
- Haythornthwaite, Philip J. (1990). The Napoleonic Source Book. London: Guild Publishing.
- James, Brigadier E.A. (1978). British Regiments 1914–18. London: Samson Books Limited. ISBN 0-906304-03-2.
- Perry, F.W. (1993). Order of Battle of Divisions Part 5B. Indian Army Divisions. Newport: Ray Westlake Military Books. ISBN 1-871167-23-X.
- Reid, Stuart (2004). Wellington's Army in the Peninsula 1809–14. Vol. 2 of Battle Orders Series. Oxford: Osprey Publishing. ISBN 1-84176-517-1.
- Smith, Digby (1998). The Greenhill Napoleonic Wars Data Book. London: Greenhill Books. ISBN 1-85367-276-9.
