= 5th Cavalry Brigade (United Kingdom) =

- Active: 1815; 1914–1919; 1920–1942
- Country: United Kingdom
- Allegiance: British Crown
- Branch: British Army
- Type: Cavalry
- Size: Brigade
- Part of: 2nd Cavalry Division (First World War); 1st Cavalry Division (Second World War)
- Engagements: Napoleonic Wars Battle of Waterloo First World War Western Front

Commanders
- Notable commanders: Sir Colquhoun Grant; Philip Chetwode, 1st Baron Chetwode; Frank Wormald

The 5th Cavalry Brigade was a cavalry brigade of the British Army. It served in the Napoleonic Wars (notably at the Battle of Waterloo), in the First World War on the Western Front where it was initially independent before being assigned to the 2nd Cavalry Division, and with the 1st Cavalry Division during the Second World War.

== History ==
=== Napoleonic Wars ===
From June 1809, Wellington organized his cavalry into one, later two, cavalry divisions (1st and 2nd) for the Peninsular War. These performed a purely administrative, rather than tactical, role; the normal tactical headquarters were provided by brigades commanding two, later usually three, regiments. The cavalry brigades were named for the commanding officer, rather than numbered. (Note: This could be a source of confusion as brigades acquired new commanders, or they moved between brigades. For example, Fane's Brigade became De Grey's Brigade from 13 May 1810 when Henry Fane went to Estremadura; De Grey's Brigade was broken up 29 January 1812. On 20 May 1813, Fane took over Slade's Brigade; the second Fane's Brigade was unrelated to the original one although coincidentally, and to add to the potential confusion, the 3rd Dragoon Guards served in both.) For the Hundred Days Campaign, he numbered his British cavalry brigades in a single sequence, 1st to 7th. (Note: The British cavalry included five regiments of the King's German Legion.) The 5th Cavalry Brigade consisted of:

- 7th (The Queen's Own) Regiment of (Light) Dragoons (Hussars)
- 15th (The King's) Regiment of (Light) Dragoons (Hussars)
- 2nd Hussars, King's German Legion

It was commanded by Sir John Colquhoun Grant (British cavalry general). The 13th Regiment of Light Dragoons was attached to the brigade (from 7th Cavalry Brigade) in the absence of the 2nd Hussars, KGL.

The brigade took part in the Battle of Waterloo. During the battle, the 7th Hussars suffered 155 casualties (56 killed, 99 wounded), the 15th Hussars 79 (23 killed, 51 wounded, 5 missing) and the 13th Light Dragoons 108 (12 killed, 78 wounded, 18 missing). This represented a loss rate of about 27%. (Note: 7th Hussars had a strength of 362, 15th Hussars 450, and 13th Light Dragoons 455.)

=== First World War ===
==== Mobilization ====
5th Cavalry Brigade was a peacetime formation of the British Army, based in Northern and Eastern Commands. At the outbreak of the war, it was headquartered at York and commanded the 2nd Dragoons (York), 12th Lancers (Norwich), 20th Hussars (Colchester) and 5th Signal Troop, Royal Engineers (York). Ipswich-based V Brigade, RHA (G and O Batteries) was attached. On mobilization, the brigade took on a role independent of The Cavalry Division. It moved to France in August 1914 with its three cavalry regiments and signal troop, and with the addition of J Battery, RHA, 4th Field Troop, Royal Engineers, and 5th Cavalry Brigade Field Ambulance.

==== Early Actions ====
In its independent role, the brigade took part in the Battle of Mons (23–24 August), Cerizy (28 August), the Retreat from Mons (23 August–5 September) and in the Battle of the Marne (6–9 September). On 6 September, it joined 3rd Cavalry Brigade in Gough's Command (under 3rd Cavalry Brigade's Br-Gen Hubert Gough). As part of Gough's Command, it took part in the First Battle of the Aisne (12–15 September). On 13 September, Gough's Command was redesignated as 2nd Cavalry Division with the addition of divisional troops (RHA, RE, etc.). It remained with 2nd Cavalry Division on the Western Front until the end of the war.

==== 2nd Cavalry Division ====
In 1914, the brigade, with the division, took part in First Battle of Ypres, notably the battle of Gheluvelt (29–31 October). In 1915, the division was in action at the Battle of Neuve Chapelle (10–12 March 1915) and the Second Battle of Ypres notable the Battle of St Julien (26 April–3 May) and the Battle of Bellewaarde Ridge (24–25 May).

On 26 February 1916, a Machine Gun Squadron was formed from the machine gun sections of the brigade's constituent regiments.

1916 saw no notable actions, but in 1917 the division saw action in the Battle of Arras (First Battle of the Scarpe, 9–11 April). and the Battle of Cambrai (the Tank Attack of 20–21 November, the Capture of Bourlon Wood of 24–28 November and the German Counter-Attack of 30 November–3 December). At other times, the brigade formed a dismounted unit and served in the trenches as a regiment under the command of the brigadier.

==== War of movement ====
1918 saw the return of the war of movement and the division took part in the First Battle of the Somme notably the Battle of St Quentin (21–23 March), the Battle of the Lys (Battle of Hazebrouck of 14–15 April), the Battle of Amiens (8–11 August) and the Second Battle of the Somme (Battle of Albert of 21–23 August and the Second Battle of Bapaume of 31 August–3 September).

The division was then split up with the 5th Cavalry Brigade serving with Fourth Army. It took part in the battles of the Hindenburg Line: the battles of St. Quentin Canal (29 September–2 October), Beaurevoir Line (3–5 October) and Cambrai (8–9 October); and in the Pursuit to the Selle (9–12 October). Its final action was to take part in the Advance in Picardy (17 October–11 November) including the Battle of the Sambre (4 November).

==== Armistice ====
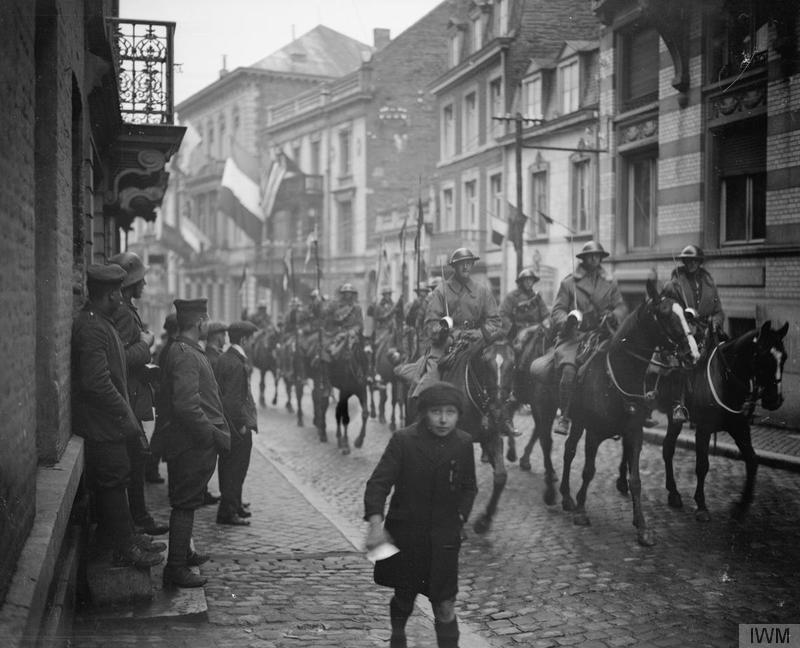
German soldiers watching the entry of the 12th Lancers into Spa, Belgium, 29 November 1918.

At the Armistice, the brigade had reached Clairfayts with Fourth Army. On 15 November, the division was re-assembled near Maubeuge and ordered to advance into Germany as an advance screen for Fourth Army and form part of the Occupation Force. The move began on 17 November, Ciney and Rochefort were reached five days later and the 5th Cavalry Brigade crossed the German border south of St. Vith on 1 December.

In late December, the division moved to winter quarters south and south-east of Liège. It remained here until 30 January 1919 when it exchanged regiments with 1st and 3rd Cavalry Divisions then gradually moved back to England. The division ceased to exist at midnight 31 March / 1 April 1919.

==== Order of battle ====
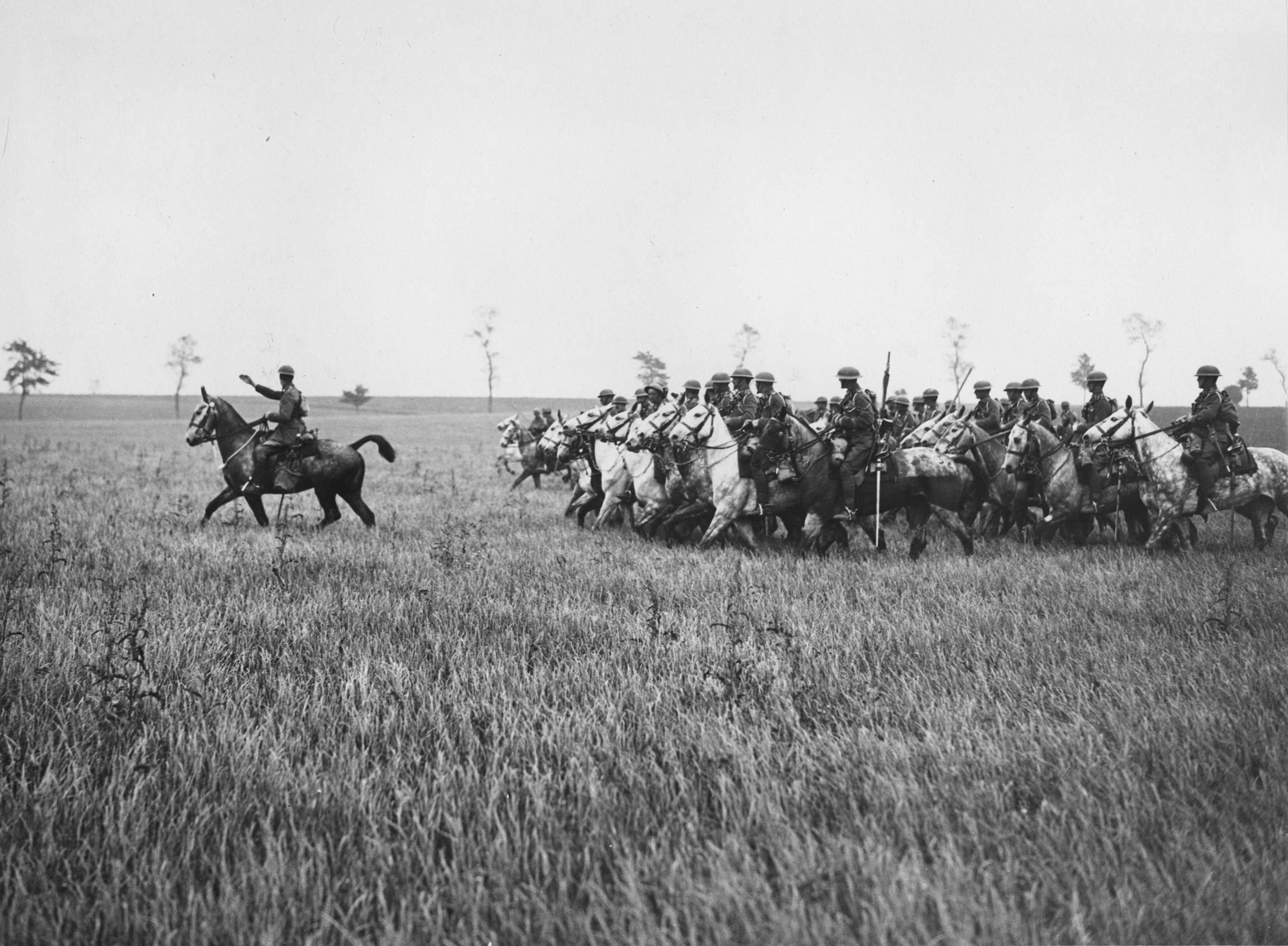
2nd Dragoons (Royal Scots Greys) training in France during the First World War.

Unit	From	To
2nd Dragoons (Royal Scots Greys)	Mobilization	
12th Royal Lancers (Prince of Wales's)	Mobilization	
20th Hussars	Mobilization	
J Battery, RHA	Mobilization	16 September 1914 (Note: J Battery, RHA transferred to 4th Cavalry Brigade.)
E Battery, RHA	17 September 1914 (Note: E Battery, RHA was permanently attached to 5th Cavalry Brigade from the Division's III Brigade, RHA.)	
4th Field Troop, Royal Engineers	Mobilization	15 October 1914 (Note: 4th Field Troop, RE absorbed into 2nd Field Squadron, RE of 2nd Cavalry Division.)
5th Signal Troop, Royal Engineers	Mobilization	
5th Cavalry Brigade Field Ambulance	Mobilization	13 September 1914 (Note: 5th Cavalry Brigade Field Ambulance transferred to 2nd Cavalry Division when the brigade joined the division.)
5th Cavalry Brigade Machine Gun Squadron, MGC	28 February 1916	

=== Second World War ===
The 5th Cavalry Brigade was a pre-war First Line Territorial Army cavalry brigade re-formed in 1920. On the outbreak of the war, it was part of Northern Command and commanded the Yorkshire Hussars, the Sherwood Rangers Yeomanry and the Queen's Own Yorkshire Dragoons. It joined the 1st Cavalry Division when it was formed on 31 October 1939.

With the 1st Cavalry Division, the 5th Cavalry Brigade departed the United Kingdom in January 1940, transited across France, and arrived in Palestine on 29 January 1940. It served as a garrison force under British Forces, Palestine and Trans-Jordan.

On 1 August 1941, the division was converted to the 10th Armoured Division and the brigade units were split up. On 23 April 1942, the headquarters was redesignated as Headquarters Desert (5 Cav) Brigade and performed administrative and Internal Security Duties in Ninth Army. On 2 June it was redesignated as headquarters 8th Division.

==== Order of battle ====
Unlike in the First World War, when brigade compositions rarely changed, there was considerable movement of units between the 4th, 5th and 6th Cavalry Brigades in the Second World War.

Unit	From	To
Yorkshire Hussars	3 September 1939	22 March 1941 (Note: Yorkshire Hussars transferred to 6th Cavalry Brigade.)
Sherwood Rangers Yeomanry	3 September 1939	2 February 1941 (Note: Sherwood Rangers transferred to HQ, Middle East Forces and was later converted into an Armoured Regiment with the 8th Armoured Brigade (former 4th Cavalry Brigade).)
Queen's Own Yorkshire Dragoons	3 September 1939	18 March 1942
North Somerset Yeomanry	20 March 1941 (Note: North Somerset Yeomanry joined from 4th Cavalry Brigade.)	20 March 1942
Cheshire Yeomanry	21 March 1941 (Note: Cheshire Yeomanry joined from 6th Cavalry Brigade.)	7 June 1941
Cheshire Yeomanry	15 July 1941	21 March 1942
Staffordshire Yeomanry	30 April 1941 (Note: Staffordshire Yeomanry joined from, and returned to, 6th Cavalry Brigade.)	4 June 1941

Of the three regiments with the brigade when it was broken up:

- the Cheshire Yeomanry was the last but one mounted cavalry regiment in the British Army. It formed 5th Lines of Communications Signal Regiment in North Africa until 1944 and later 17th Lines of Communications Signal Regiment in the North West Europe campaign.
- the Yorkshire Dragoons had the distinction of being the last active Cavalry unit of the British Army, then had a number of different roles Anti-Tank Artillery during the Second Battle of El Alamein, then converted into an Infantry unit part of 18th Infantry Brigade. They were later redesignated as 9th Battalion, Kings Own Yorkshire Light Infantry.
- the North Somerset Yeomanry formed 4th Air Formations Signal Regiment (to provide communications between the Army and the RAF) in North Africa and later in Sicily and Italy. It was redesignated as 14th Air Formations Signal Regiment and served throughout the North West Europe campaign.

== Commanders ==
The 5th Cavalry Brigade had the following commanders during the First World War:

From	Rank	Name
Mobilization	Brigadier-General	Sir P.W. Chetwode, Bt.
15 July 1915	Brigadier-General	F. Wormald (killed, 3 October 1915)
4 October 1915	Brigadier-General	T.T. Pitman (tempy.)
5 October 1915	Brigadier-General	C.L.K. Campbell (died, 31 March 1918)
21 March 1918	Lieutenant-Colonel	W.F. Collins (acting)
8 April 1918	Brigadier-General	N.W. Haig
4 November 1918	Lieutenant-Colonel	A.C. Little (acting)
10 November 1918	Brigadier-General	N.W. Haig

The 5th Cavalry Brigade had the following commanders during the Second World War:

From	Rank	Name
3 September 1939	Brigadier	T. Preston
3 January 1940	Brigadier	C.H. Miller
8 September 1940	Lieutenant-Colonel	The Lord Grimthorpe (acting)
8 October 1940	Brigadier	K.F.W. Dunn
16 September 1941	Lieutenant-Colonel	W.L. Wilson (acting)
22 September 1941	Lieutenant-Colonel	D.E. Williams (acting)
27 September 1941	Colonel	C.H. Gaisford St. Lawrence (acting)
3 January 1942	Brigadier	C.H. Gaisford St. Lawrence
23 April 1942	Brigadier	C.E.L. Harris

== See also ==
- Order of battle of the Waterloo campaign
- British Army during World War I
- British Cavalry Corps order of battle 1914
- British cavalry during the First World War
- List of British brigades of the Second World War
- Structure of the British Army in 1939

== Bibliography ==
- Becke, Archibald F. (1935). Order of Battle of Divisions Part 1–The Regular British Divisions. London: HMSO. OCLC 4405016.
- Bellis, Malcolm A. (1994). Regiments of the British Army 1939–1945 (Armour & Infantry). London: Military Press International. ISBN 0-85420-999-9.
- Haythornthwaite, Philip J. (1990). The Napoleonic Source Book. London: Guild Publishing.
- Joslen, H. F. (2003) [1960]. Orders of Battle: Second World War, 1939–1945. Uckfield, East Sussex: Naval and Military Press. ISBN 978-1-84342-474-1.
- Mileham, Patrick (1994). The Yeomanry Regiments; 200 Years of Tradition. Edinburgh: Canongate Academic. ISBN 1-898410-36-4.
- Reid, Stuart (2004). Wellington's Army in the Peninsula 1809–14. Vol. 2 of Battle Orders Series. Oxford: Osprey Publishing. ISBN 1-84176-517-1.
- Smith, Digby (1998). The Greenhill Napoleonic Wars Data Book. London: Greenhill Books. ISBN 1-85367-276-9.
