= Frank Wormald =

British Army general

Brigadier-General Frank Wormald CB
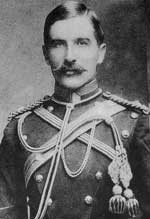
- Born: 10 February 1868; Dewsbury, England
- Died: 3 October 1915 (aged 47); Vermelles, France
- Military career
- Allegiance: United Kingdom
- Branch: British Army
- Service years: 1889–1915
- Rank: Brigadier-General
- Units: Duke of Wellington's Regiment; 12th Royal Lancers
- Commands: 12th (Prince of Wales's Royal) Lancers; 5th Cavalry Brigade
- Conflicts: Second Boer War; First World War
- Awards: Companion Order of the Bath; Mentioned in Despatches

Brigadier-General Frank Wormald, CB (10 February 1868 − 3 October 1915) was a British Army general. He served in the Second Boer War and the First World War where he held the command of the 5th Cavalry Brigade.

== Military career ==
Wormald was born in Dewsbury, Yorkshire 10 February 1868, the son of mill owner John and Annie Wormald. When married he and his wife Gwynifred resided at 10 Walton Place London, adjacent to Harrods. He was a successful big game hunter in India and Africa and became a well known polo player.

He joined the British Army, initially being commissioned as a second lieutenant in one of the Militia battalions of the Duke of Wellington's Regiment in May 1887. He transferred over to the 12th (Prince of Wales's Royal) Lancers, and the Regular Army, on 20 November 1889. He was promoted to lieutenant on 25 March 1891, and to captain on 11 May 1898.

He fought in the Second Boer War, and took part in operations in the Orange Free State and Transvaal, including the Battle of Paardeberg and the Relief of Kimberley. For his service in the war he was mentioned in dispatches (including the final despatch by Major General Lord Kitchener dated 23 June 1902), received the brevet rank of major on 29 November 1900, and the Queen's South Africa Medal with 5 clasps.

Following the end of the war in June 1902, he left Cape Town on the SS Sicilia and returned to Southampton in late July. He was captain of a provisional regiment of lancers in late 1902. In August 1904 he was promoted to major.

In 1912, after being promoted to lieutenant colonel in August, he was given command of his regiment, serving in the First World War. Serving on the Western Front in France from August 1914. Wounded in his regiments successful charge against the German 1st and 2nd Garde Dragoner on 28 August 1914, he was out of action for three weeks. After being made a Companion of the Order of the Bath in February 1915, he was promoted to the temporary rank of brigadier-general in July and given command of the 5th Cavalry Brigade in the place of Philip Chetwode. He was killed on 3 October 1915, while inspecting front line trenches where his brigade were working digging and clearing up battlefield debris. The brigades' war diary records:

Brigadier-General Frank Wormald killed by shrapnel whilst going round trenches of late battlefield, Vermelles.

He is buried at Nedonchel Churchyard in France.

== See also ==
- List of generals of the British Empire who died during the First World War

== Bibliography ==
- Davies, Frank; Maddocks, Graham (2014) [1995]. Bloody Red Tabs: General Officer Casualties of the Great War 1914–1918. Pen and Sword Books. ISBN 978-1-78346-237-7.
