= 3rd Cavalry Division (United Kingdom) =

WW1 British Army formation

- Division insignia
- Active: 1 September 1914 – 31 March 1919
- Country: United Kingdom
- Branch: British Army
- Type: Cavalry
- Size: Division
- Part of: Cavalry Corps
- Engagements: World War I Defence of Antwerp First Battle of Ypres Second Battle of Ypres Battle of Loos Battle of Arras (1917) First Battle of the Somme (1918) Battle of St Quentin Battle of the Avre Battle of Amiens (1918) Hindenburg Line Battle of Cambrai (1918) Pursuit to the Selle Advance in Flanders

Commanders
- Notable commanders: Julian Byng, 1st Viscount Byng of Vimy

The 3rd Cavalry Division was a division of the British Army in the First World War. It was formed at Ludgershall, Wiltshire England in September 1914 under the command of Major-General the Hon. Julian Byng. The division moved to Belgium in the first week of October 1914, landing at Ostend, although its third Brigade was only formed there once. During the war the division took part in most of the major actions where cavalry were used as a mounted mobile force, and also many where the troops were dismounted and effectively served as infantry.

On 11 November 1918, units of the division had reached the River Dender at Leuze and Lessines in Belgium, when orders were received that they would cover the advance of the British Second Army into Germany. They started the advance on 17 November, divisional headquarters being established at Waterloo on 21 November. The following year they wintered in Belgium, and the division was officially demobilised by 31 March 1919.

== History ==
=== Formation ===
The 3rd Cavalry Division began forming on 1 September 1914 at Ludgershall, Wiltshire. Initially it commanded just two cavalry brigades – the 6th and the 7th – and divisional troops.

The 6th Cavalry Brigade was formed with the 1st Dragoons and the 10th Hussars, both from Potchefstroom, South Africa, and the 3rd Dragoon Guards from the Force in Egypt (though they did not join the brigade until 4 November in Belgium), the only regular British Army cavalry regiments not stationed in the United Kingdom or India at the outbreak of the war. (Note: In August 1914, the regular British Army cavalry comprised 31 regiments. 19 regiments were in the United Kingdom, nine in India, two in South Africa and one with the Force in Egypt.)

The 7th Cavalry Brigade was formed with the three Household Cavalry regiments, the only regular cavalry regiments remaining in the United Kingdom after mobilization of the BEF and its transport to France. (Note: The BEF mobilized with five cavalry brigades of three regiments each, plus two regiments employed as divisional cavalry squadrons, for a total of 17 regiments. The Household Cavalry Composite Regiment was formed as the 17th regiment.) The 1st Life Guards joined from Hyde Park, the 2nd Life Guards from Regent's Park and the Royal Horse Guards from Windsor. Each regiment only consisted of two squadrons as each had provided a squadron to the Household Cavalry Composite Regiment in 4th Cavalry Brigade in August 1914. The detached squadrons did not rejoin their parent regiments until 11 November 1914 in Belgium.

XV Brigade, Royal Horse Artillery (and Brigade Ammunition Column) was formed for the division. In peacetime, K Battery, RHA was at Christchurch and C Battery, RHA at Canterbury. Later, G Battery, RHA (originally at Ipswich) would join in Belgium. Strangely, two RHA brigades formed early in the war were simultaneously designated as XV Brigade, RHA. The other was formed at Leamington, Warwickshire in January 1915 for 29th Division. The 3rd Cavalry Division's brigade was renumbered as IV Brigade, RHA in May 1915.

The 3rd Field Squadron, Royal Engineers was formed on 16 September and the 3rd Signal Squadron, Royal Engineers on 12 September, both at Ludgershall. The division was also provided with two Cavalry Field Ambulances (6th and 7th), two Mobile Veterinary Sections (13th and 14th), and a divisional supply column (four companies of the Army Service Corps).

The division departed Ludgershall on 5 October, embarked at Southampton on 6 October and landed at Ostend on 8 October (7th Brigade at Zeebrugge on 7 October) and deployed to the Western Front in France and Belgium.

=== Early actions ===
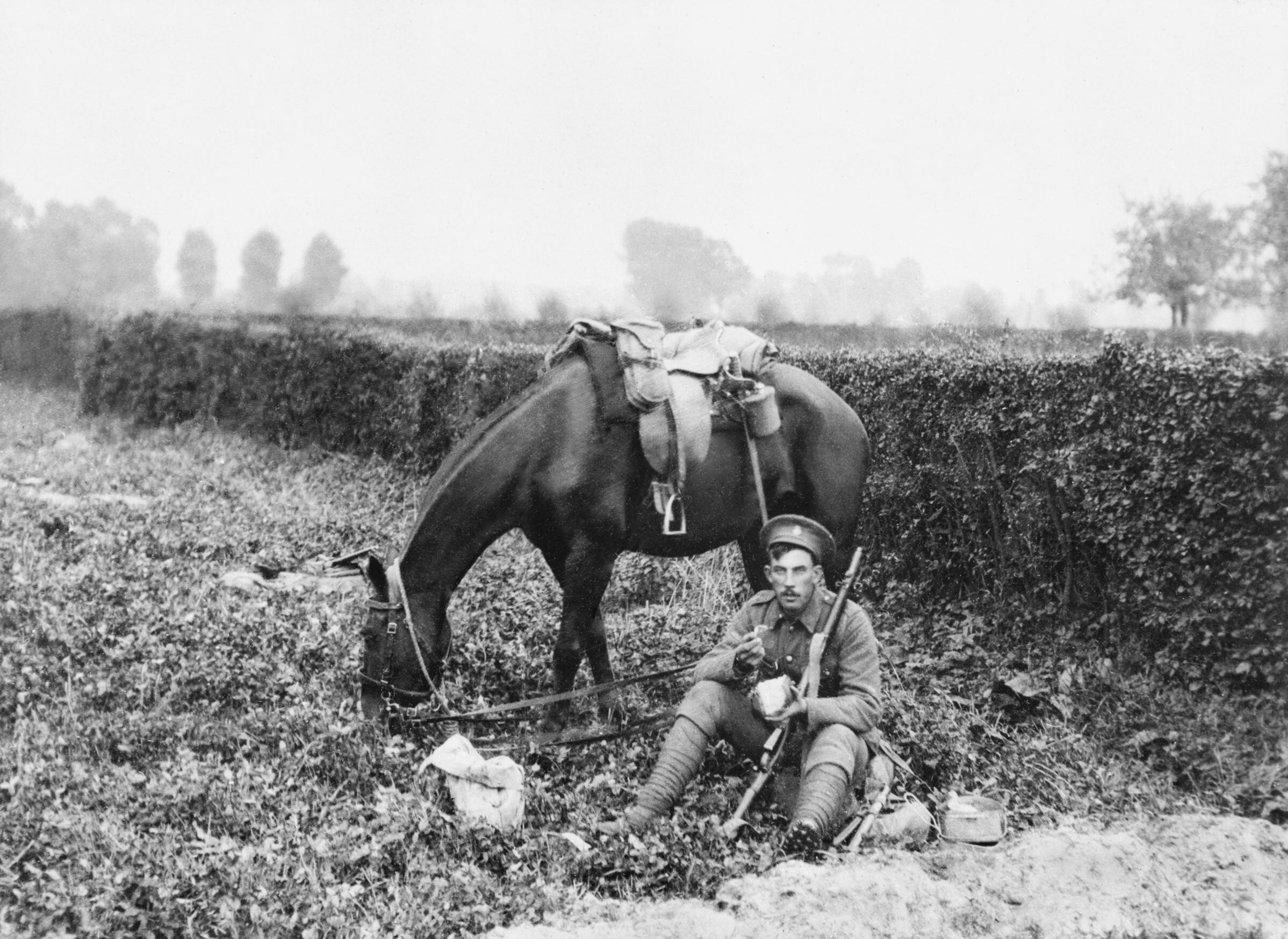
British cavalryman in Belgium, 13 October 1914

The 3rd Cavalry Division served on the Western Front until the end of the war. In 1914, the division saw action in the defence of Antwerp (9 and 10 October) and the First Battle of Ypres, notably the battles of Langemarck (21–24 October), Gheluvelt (29–31 October) and Nonne Bosschen (11 November).

To bring the division up to the standard strength of three brigades, the 8th Cavalry Brigade was formed in Belgium on 20 November 1914 with the 10th Hussars from 6th Cavalry Brigade and the Royal Horse Guards from 7th Cavalry Brigade. Each brigade was made up to three-regiment strength with yeomanry regiments: 6th Cavalry Brigade with the 1/1st North Somerset Yeomanry from 1st South Western Mounted Brigade, 7th Cavalry Brigade with the 1/1st Leicestershire Yeomanry from North Midland Mounted Brigade, and 8th Cavalry Brigade with the 1/1st Essex Yeomanry from Eastern Mounted Brigade. With the addition of its third brigade, 3rd Cavalry Division also obtained a third Cavalry Field Ambulance (8th, from England on 23 December) and a third Mobile Veterinary Section (20th, from England on 9 March 1915).

=== 1915–17 ===
In 1915, the division took part in the Second Battle of Ypres (Battle of Frezenberg Ridge, 11–13 May) and the Battle of Loos (26–28 September).

On 29 February 1916, Machine Gun Squadrons were added to the cavalry brigades, formed from the machine gun sections of each brigade's constituent regiments.

1916 saw no notable actions, but in 1917 the division saw action in the Battle of Arras (First Battle of the Scarpe, 9–12 April). At other times, the brigades formed dismounted units and served in the trenches as regiments under the command of their brigadiers.

=== Reconstituted ===
In March 1918, the 4th (formerly 1st Indian) and 5th (formerly 2nd Indian) Cavalry Divisions were broken up in France. The Indian elements were sent to Egypt where they formed part of the new 4th and 5th Cavalry Divisions which played a major part in the successful conclusion of the Sinai and Palestine Campaign. The British and Canadian units remained in France and most of them were transferred to the 3rd Cavalry Division causing it to be extensively reorganized.

The Household Cavalry regiments were concentrated in the 7th Cavalry Brigade and the yeomanry regiments in the 8th Cavalry Brigade. The latter left the division on 14 March 1918, the day after the Canadian Cavalry Brigade joined from 5th Cavalry Division. The three Household Cavalry regiments left 7th Cavalry Brigade on 10 March. They were dismounted and converted to machine gunners as No. 1 (1st Life Guards), No. 2 (2nd Life Guards) and No. 3 (Royal Horse Guards) Battalions of the Guards Machine Gun Regiment at Étaples. They were replaced in the brigade on the same day by the 7th Dragoon Guards from 9th (Secunderabad) Cavalry Brigade of the 5th Cavalry Division, the 6th (Inniskilling) Dragoons from 5th (Mhow) Cavalry Brigade of the 4th Cavalry Division and the 17th Lancers from 2nd (Sialkot) Cavalry Brigade also of the 4th Cavalry Division. On 11 March, all three regiments came on the British War Establishment i.e. changed from a 4-squadron to a 3-squadron organisation.

1918 saw the return of the war of movement and the division took part in the First Battle of the Somme notably the Battle of St Quentin (21–23 March), Actions of the Somme Crossings (24 and 25 March) and Battle of the Avre (4 and 5 April); the Battle of Amiens and the battles of the Hindenburg Line (Battle of Cambrai, 8 and 9 October and the Pursuit to the Selle, 9–12 October). Its final action was in the Advance in Flanders (9–11 November).

=== Armistice ===
At the Armistice, units of the division had reached the River Dender at Leuze and Lessines in Belgium, when orders were received that they would cover the advance of the Second Army into Germany. They started the advance on 17 November, divisional headquarters being established at Waterloo on 21 November. Transport difficulties meant that the only one cavalry division could advance with Second Army so the following winter was spent in Belgium. By 31 March 1919, the division was demobilized.

== Order of battle ==
=== 6th Cavalry Brigade ===
6th Cavalry Brigade was formed on 19 September 1914 at Ludgershall, Wiltshire and served with the division throughout the war.

Unit	From	To
1st (Royal) Dragoons	19 September 1914	
10th (Prince Of Wales’s Own Royal) Hussars	22 September 1914	20 November 1914
10th (Prince Of Wales’s Own Royal) Hussars	12 March 1918	
3rd (Prince Of Wales’s) Dragoon Guards	4 November 1914	
1/1st North Somerset Yeomanry	13 November 1914	13 March 1918
1/1st North Somerset Yeomanry	April 1918 (Note: 1/1st North Somerset Yeomanry left to become a cyclist unit, then to form a machine gun battalion with the 1/1st Leicestershire Yeomanry. The German spring offensive forestalled this plan, and the regiment was remounted and returned to 3rd Cavalry Division. From April it was split up with a squadron joining each regiment in 6th Cavalry Brigade (3rd Dragoon Guards, 1st Dragoons and 10th Hussars).)	
C Battery, RHA	19 October 1914	
6th Signal Troop Royal Engineers	19 September 1914	
6th Cavalry Brigade Machine Gun Squadron, MGC	28 February 1916	

=== 7th Cavalry Brigade ===
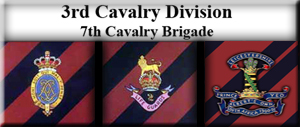
1st Life Guards, 2nd Life Guards and Leicestershire Yeomanry which made up the 7th Cavalry Brigade for the majority of its existence.

7th Cavalry Brigade was formed on 1 September 1914 at Ludgershall, Wiltshire and served with the division throughout the war. It was extensively restructured on 10 March 1918.

Unit	From	To
1st Life Guards	1 September 1914	10 March 1918
2nd Life Guards	1 September 1914	10 March 1918
Royal Horse Guards	1 September 1914	21 November 1914
Royal Horse Guards	7 November 1917	10 March 1918
1/1st Leicestershire Yeomanry	12 November 1914	7 November 1917
7th (Princess Royal’s) Dragoon Guards	10 March 1918	
6th (Inniskilling) Dragoons	10 March 1918	
17th (Duke Of Cambridge’s Own) Lancers	10 March 1918	
K Battery, RHA	16 October 1914	
7th Signal Troop Royal Engineers	1 September 1914	
7th Cavalry Brigade Machine Gun Squadron, MGC	28 February 1916	14 April 1918 (Note: 7th Cavalry Brigade Machine Gun Squadron was broken up with the officers and men returning to the Household Cavalry regiments.)
8th Cavalry Brigade Machine Gun Squadron, MGC	11 March 1918 (Note: 8th Cavalry Brigade Machine Gun Squadron transferred to 7th Cavalry Brigade on 11 March 1918 and was redesignated 7th Cavalry Brigade Machine Gun Squadron on 4 May 1918.)	

=== 8th Cavalry Brigade ===
8th Cavalry Brigade was formed in Belgium on 20 November 1914. It left the division on 14 March 1918, the day after the Canadian Cavalry Brigade joined.

Unit	From	To
Royal Horse Guards	20 November 1914	7 November 1917
10th (Prince Of Wales’s Own Royal) Hussars	20 November 1914	12 March 1918
1/1st Essex Yeomanry	11 December 1914	14 March 1918
1/1st Leicestershire Yeomanry	7 November 1917	14 March 1918
1/1st North Somerset Yeomanry	13 March 1918	14 March 1918
G Battery, RHA	25 November 1914	13 March 1918
8th Signal Troop Royal Engineers	20 November 1914	
8th Cavalry Brigade Machine Gun Squadron, MGC	29 February 1916	11 March 1918

=== Canadian Cavalry Brigade ===
The Canadian Cavalry Brigade was attached to the division from 10 April to 17 June 1916 before transferring to the 2nd Indian Cavalry Division. It rejoined the division on 13 March 1918 from 5th Cavalry Division.

Royal Canadian Dragoons
Lord Strathcona's Horse
Fort Garry Horse
Canadian Cavalry Brigade Machine-Gun Squadron
Canadian Cavalry Signal Troop

=== Divisional Artillery ===
IV Brigade, Royal Horse Artillery

C Battery, Royal Horse Artillery attached to 6th Cavalry Brigade (Note: Equipped with six 13 pounders.)
G Battery, Royal Horse Artillery attached to 8th Cavalry Brigade
K Battery, Royal Horse Artillery attached to 7th Cavalry Brigade
IV Brigade Ammunition Column

Royal Canadian Horse Artillery Brigade (rejoined the Canadian Cavalry Brigade on 14 April 1918)

A Battery, RCHA (Note: Equipped with four 13 pounders.)
B Battery, RCHA

=== Divisional Troops ===
The division was supported by the following units:

	Unit	From	To
Engineers	3rd Field Squadron, Royal Engineers	16 September 1914	
Signals	3rd Signal Squadron, Royal Engineers	12 September 1914	
Medical	6th Cavalry Field Ambulance	14 September 1914	
Medical	7th Cavalry Field Ambulance	3 October 1914	
Medical	8th Cavalry Field Ambulance	23 December 1914	14 March 1918 (Note: 8th Cavalry Field Ambulance left the same day as 8th Cavalry Brigade.)
Medical	7th Canadian Field Ambulance	13 March 1918 (Note: 7th Canadian Field Ambulance joined with the Canadian Cavalry Brigade.)	
Medical	No. 12 Sanitary Section	9 January 1915	
Medical	3rd Cavalry Division Field Ambulance Workshop	14 May 1915	1 April 1916 (Note: 3rd Cavalry Division Field Ambulance Workshop absorbed into Divisional Supply Column.)
Veterinary	13th Mobile Veterinary Section	Formation	
Veterinary	14th Mobile Veterinary Section	Formation	
Veterinary	20th Mobile Veterinary Section	9 March 1915	14 March 1918 (Note: 20th Mobile Veterinary Section left the same day as 8th Cavalry Brigade.)
Veterinary	"A" Canadian Mobile Veterinary Section	13 March 1918 (Note: "A" Canadian Mobile Veterinary Section joined with the Canadian Cavalry Brigade.)	
Army Service Corps	81st (Horsed Transport) Company, ASC; HQ 3rd Cavalry Divisional ASC	14 September 1914	
Army Service Corps	576th (Horsed Transport) Company, ASC; 3rd Cavalry Divisional Auxiliary (Horse) Company	23 September 1915	
Army Service Corps	73rd (Mechanical Transport) Company, ASC; 3rd Cavalry Divisional Supply Column	4 September 1914	
Army Service Corps	414th (Mechanical Transport) Company, ASC; 3rd Cavalry Divisional Supply Column	16 September 1914	10 October 1916 (Note: 414th (M. T.) Company, ASC absorbed into 73rd (M. T.) Company, ASC.)
Army Service Corps	76th (Mechanical Transport) Company, ASC; 3rd Cavalry Divisional Ammunition Park	Formation	23 December 1917
Others	7th Light Armoured Car Battery	30 March 1916	18 July 1917
Others	773rd Divisional Employment Company	16 September 1917	

== Commanders ==
The 3rd Cavalry Division had the following commanders:

From	Rank	Name
29 September 1914; Formation	Major-General	the Hon. J. H. G. Byng (Note: To Cavalry Corps 19 April – 3 May 1915.)
19 April 1915	Brigadier-General	D. G. M. Campbell (acting)
4 May 1915	Major-General	the Hon. J. H. G. Byng
7 May 1915	Major-General	C. J. Briggs
12 October 1915	Brigadier-General	C. B. Bulkeley-Johnson (acting)
15 October 1915	Major-General	J. Vaughan
17 October 1917	Brigadier-General	A. E. W. Harman (acting)
8 December 1917	Major-General	J. Vaughan
14 March 1918	Brigadier-General	A. E. W. Harman (acting)
5 May 1918	Major-General	A. E. W. Harman

== See also ==
- List of British divisions in World War I
- British Army during World War I
- British Cavalry Corps order of battle 1914
- British cavalry during the First World War

== Bibliography ==
- Becke, Archibald F. (1935). Order of Battle of Divisions Part 1–The Regular British Divisions. London: HMSO. OCLC 4405016.
- James, Brigadier E.A. (1978). British Regiments 1914–18. London: Samson Books Limited. ISBN 0-906304-03-2.
- Perry, F.W. (1993). Order of Battle of Divisions Part 5B. Indian Army Divisions. Newport: Ray Westlake Military Books. ISBN 1-871167-23-X.
