= 4th Cavalry Brigade (United Kingdom) =

- Active: 1815; 1900; 1914–1919; 1939–1941
- Country: United Kingdom
- Allegiance: British Crown
- Branch: British Army
- Type: Cavalry
- Size: Brigade
- Part of: 2nd Cavalry Division (First World War); 1st Cavalry Division (Second World War)
- Engagements: Napoleonic Wars Battle of Waterloo First World War Western Front Second World War Anglo-Iraqi War Syria–Lebanon campaign Battle of Palmyra

Commanders
- Notable commanders: Sir John Ormsby Vandeleur; The Hon Sir Cecil Edward Bingham; James Joseph Kingstone

The 4th Cavalry Brigade was a cavalry brigade of the British Army. It served in the Napoleonic Wars (notably at the Battle of Waterloo), in the First World War on the Western Front where it was initially assigned to The Cavalry Division before spending most of the war with the 2nd Cavalry Division, and with the 1st Cavalry Division during the Second World War.

== History ==
=== Napoleonic Wars ===
From June 1809, Wellington organized his cavalry into one, later two, cavalry divisions (1st and 2nd) for the Peninsular War. These performed a purely administrative, rather than tactical, role; the normal tactical headquarters were provided by brigades commanding two, later usually three, regiments. The cavalry brigades were named for the commanding officer, rather than numbered. (Note: This could be a source of confusion as brigades acquired new commanders, or they moved between brigades. For example, Fane's Brigade became De Grey's Brigade from 13 May 1810 when Henry Fane went to Estremadura; De Grey's Brigade was broken up 29 January 1812. On 20 May 1813, Fane took over Slade's Brigade; the second Fane's Brigade was unrelated to the original one although coincidentally, and to add to the potential confusion, the 3rd Dragoon Guards served in both.) For the Hundred Days Campaign, he numbered his British cavalry brigades in a single sequence, 1st to 7th. (Note: The British cavalry included five regiments of the King's German Legion.) The 4th Cavalry Brigade consisted of:

- 11th Light Dragoons
- 12th (Prince of Wales's) Light Dragoons
- 16th (Queen's) Light Dragoons

It was commanded by Major General Sir John Ormsby Vandeleur.

The brigade took part in the Battle of Waterloo. During the battle, the 11th Light Dragoons suffered 63 casualties (12 killed, 28 wounded, 23 missing), the 12th Light Dragoons 111 (47 killed, 64 wounded) and the 16th Light Dragoons just 30 (10 killed, 20 wounded). This represented a loss rate of about 15%. (Note: 11th Light Dragoons had a strength of 442, 12th Light Dragoons 433, and 16th Light Dragoons 440.)

=== Second Boer War ===
Following the outbreak of the Second Boer War in late 1899, a 4th Cavalry Brigade was established under the command of Major-General John Dickson. The brigade was composed of squadrons from the 7th Dragoon Guards, 8th Hussars and 17th Lancers, with drafts from the 19th Hussars and 1st Dragoons, and was mobilized for service on 1 January 1900, leaving for South Africa the following month. The Mounted Infantry for the brigade was 300 men strong, and was drawn from the 2nd Battalion Leicestershire Regiment, the 1st Battalion Royal Berkshire Regiment, the 1st Battalion Yorkshire Light Infantry, the 2nd Battalion Manchester Regiment, the 4th Battalion of the King's Royal Rifle Corps, and the 4th Battalion of the Rifle Brigade, with a machine-gun section from the 2nd Battalion Liverpool Regiment. The No. 20 Field Hospital Royal Army Medical Corps was attached to the brigade.

=== First World War ===
==== Mobilization ====
4th Cavalry Brigade was a peacetime formation of the British Army, based in Eastern Command. At the outbreak of the war, it was headquartered at Canterbury and commanded the 6th Dragoon Guards (Carabiniers) (at Canterbury), 3rd (King's Own) Hussars (at Shorncliffe) and 4th Signal Troop, Royal Engineers (at Canterbury). A number of units were attached to the brigade: the 19th (Queen Alexandra's Own Royal) Hussars at Hounslow, the Woolwich-based X Brigade, RHA (P and R Batteries), II Brigade, RHA (consisting of just C Battery and based at Canterbury) and King Edward's Horse of the Special Reserve (based at Chelsea).

On mobilization, the brigade was brought up to its full – three regiment – strength with the addition of the Household Cavalry Composite Regiment; (Note: The Household Cavalry Composite Regiment was formed on mobilization by taking one squadron from each of the Household Cavalry regiments (1st Life Guards at Hyde Park, 2nd Life Guards at Regent's Park and the Royal Horse Guards at Windsor).) 4th Cavalry Brigade Field Ambulance also joined and the attached units departed at this point. (Note: 19th Hussars was split up, with squadrons attached to the 4th, 5th and 6th Infantry Divisions as divisional cavalry squadrons; X Brigade, RHA remained at Woolwich throughout the war in a training role as X (Reserve) Brigade, RHA; C Battery, RHA joined XIV Brigade in 7th Division at Lyndhurst on formation; and King Edward's Horse was later split up, with squadrons attached to the 12th, 47th and 48th Infantry Divisions as divisional cavalry squadrons.) The brigade joined The Cavalry Division along with 1st, 2nd and 3rd Cavalry Brigades and moved to France in August 1914.

==== Early actions ====
With The Cavalry Division, the brigade took part in a number of actions during the early war of movement: the Battle of Mons (23–24 August), the Battle of Le Cateau (26 August), the action at Néry (1 September), the Battle of the Marne (6–9 September) and the Battle of the Aisne (12–15 September).

The brigade was transferred to the 2nd Cavalry Division on 14 October 1914 to bring it up to the standard three brigade strength. It remained with the division on the Western Front until the end of the war.

==== 2nd Cavalry Division ====
In 1914, the brigade, with the division, took part in First Battle of Ypres, notably the battle of Gheluvelt (29–31 October). On 11 November, the Household Cavalry Composite Regiment was broken up and its constituent squadrons rejoined their parent regiments. The 1/1st Queen's Own Oxfordshire Hussars, a Yeomanry regiment, joined in its place.

In 1915, the division was in action at the Battle of Neuve Chapelle (10–12 March 1915) and the Second Battle of Ypres notably the Battle of St Julien (26 April–3 May) and the Battle of Bellewaarde Ridge (24–25 May).

On 28 February 1916, a Machine Gun Squadron was formed from the machine gun sections of the brigade's constituent regiments.

1916 saw no notable actions, but in 1917 the division saw action in the Battle of Arras (First Battle of the Scarpe, 9–11 April). and the Battle of Cambrai (the Tank Attack of 20–21 November, the Capture of Bourlon Wood of 24–28 November and the German Counter-Attack of 30 November–3 December). At other times, the brigade formed a dismounted unit and served in the trenches as a regiment under the command of the brigadier.

==== War of movement ====
1918 saw the return of the war of movement and the division took part in the First Battle of the Somme notably the Battle of St Quentin (21–23 March), the Battle of the Lys (Battle of Hazebrouck of 14–15 April), the Battle of Amiens (8–11 August) and the Second Battle of the Somme (Battle of Albert of 21–23 August and the Second Battle of Bapaume of 31 August–3 September).

The division was then split up with the 4th Cavalry Brigade serving with Third Army. The brigade took part in the battles of the Hindenburg Line, notably the Battle of the Canal du Nord (27 September–1 October) and the Pursuit to the Selle (9–12 October). Its final action was to take part in the Advance in Picardy (17 October–11 November) including the Battle of the Sambre (4 November), still with Third Army.

==== Armistice ====
At the Armistice, the brigade had reached Erquelinnes with Third Army. On 15 November, the division was re-assembled near Maubeuge and ordered to advance into Germany as an advance screen for Fourth Army and form part of the Occupation Force. The move began on 17 November, Ciney and Rochefort were reached five days later.

In late December, the division moved to winter quarters south and south-east of Liège. It remained here until 30 January 1919 when it exchanged regiments with 1st and 3rd Cavalry Divisions then gradually moved back to England. The Division ceased to exist at midnight 31 March / 1 April 1919.

==== Order of battle ====
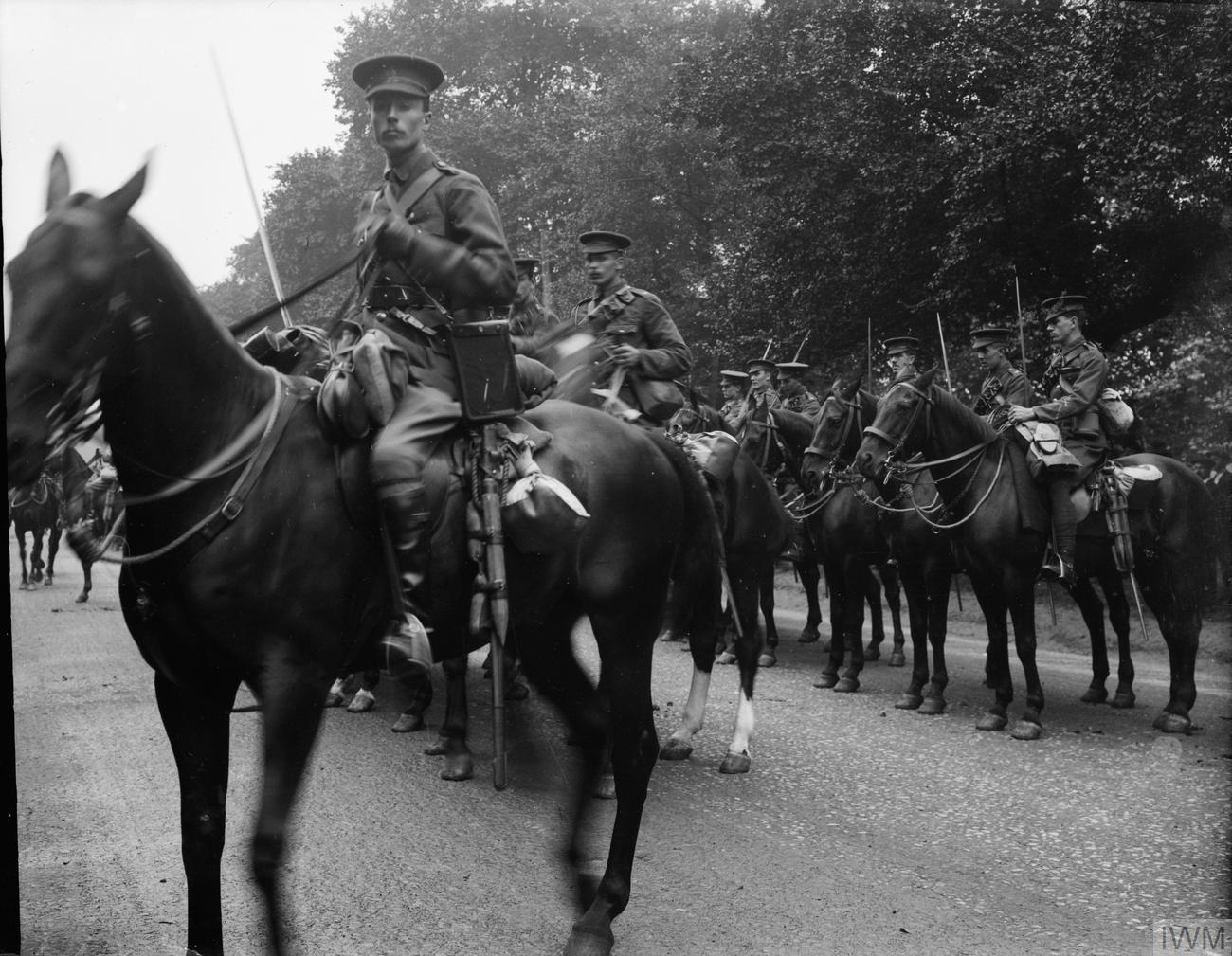
Squadron from the 1st Life Guards August 1914, attached to the Household Cavalry Composite Regiment, preparing to leave for France.

Unit	From	To
Household Cavalry Composite Regiment	Mobilization	11 November 1914 (Note: Household Cavalry Composite Regiment broken up and the squadrons rejoined their parent regiments.)
6th Dragoon Guards (Carabiniers)	Mobilization	
3rd (King's Own) Hussars	Mobilization	
1/1st Queen's Own Oxfordshire Hussars	11 November 1914 (Note: 1/1st Queen's Own Oxfordshire Hussars joined from 2nd South Midland Mounted Brigade to replace the Household Cavalry Composite Regiment.)	
J Battery, RHA	16 September 1914 (Note: J Battery, RHA joined from 5th Cavalry Brigade and was permanently attached to 4th Cavalry Brigade.)	
4th Signal Troop, Royal Engineers	Mobilization	
4th Cavalry Brigade Field Ambulance	Mobilization	16 October 1914 (Note: 4th Cavalry Brigade Field Ambulance transferred to 2nd Cavalry Division when the brigade joined the division.)
4th Cavalry Brigade Machine Gun Squadron, MGC	28 February 1916	

=== Second World War ===
The 4th Cavalry Brigade was reformed in October 1939 and took command of a composite regiment of Household Cavalry and two Yeomanry regiments (North Somerset Yeomanry and Royal Wiltshire Yeomanry). It joined the 1st Cavalry Division when it was formed on 31 October 1939.

With the 1st Cavalry Division, the 4th Cavalry Brigade departed the United Kingdom in February 1940, transited across France, and arrived in Palestine on 20 February 1940. It served as a garrison force under British Forces, Palestine and Trans-Jordan.

From 6 May 1941 the brigade, together with a battalion of infantry from the Essex Regiment, a mechanised regiment from the Arab Legion and supporting artillery was organised as Habforce for operations in Iraq including the relief of the base at RAF Habbaniya and the occupation of Baghdad. Following this, in July 1941 it was placed under the command of I Australian Corps and was involved in operations against the Vichy French in Syria, advancing from eastern Iraq near the Trans-Jordan border on Palmyra to secure the Haditha – Tripoli oil pipeline.

On 1 August 1941, the Division was converted into the 10th Armoured Division and the 4th Cavalry Brigade into the 9th Armoured Brigade. 9th Armoured Brigade would later take part in the Second Battle of El Alamein and the Italian Campaign.

==== Order of battle ====
Unlike in the First World War, when brigade compositions rarely changed, there was considerable movement of units between the 4th, 5th and 6th Cavalry Brigades in the Second World War.

Unit	From	To
Household Cavalry Composite Regiment	13 November 1939	12 January 1941
1st Household Cavalry Regiment (Note: Household Cavalry Composite Regiment was redesignated 1st Household Cavalry Regiment.)	13 January 1941	31 July 1941
North Somerset Yeomanry	15 November 1939	21 March 1941 (Note: North Somerset Yeomanry transferred to 5th Cavalry Brigade.)
Royal Wiltshire Yeomanry	3 December 1939	2 October 1940 (Note: Royal Wiltshire Yeomanry transferred to, and returned from, 6th Cavalry Brigade.)
Royal Wiltshire Yeomanry	8 January 1941	31 July 1941
Warwickshire Yeomanry	22 March 1941 (Note: Warwickshire Yeomanry transferred from 6th Cavalry Brigade.)	31 July 1941

Of the three regiments with the brigade when it was converted to an armoured formation:

- the 1st Household Cavalry Regiment converted into an Armoured Regiment in 9th Armoured Brigade before becoming the Reconnaissance Regiment for 10th Armoured Division.
- the Royal Wiltshire Yeomanry converted into an Armoured Regiment in 9th Armoured Brigade. It fought in the Second Battle of El Alamein and the Italian Campaign.
- the Warwickshire Yeomanry converted into an Armoured Regiment in 9th Armoured Brigade. It also fought at El Alamein and throughout the Italian Campaign.

== Commanders ==
The 4th Cavalry Brigade had the following commanders during the First World War:

From	Rank	Name
Mobilization	Brigadier-General	Hon. C.E. Bingham
30 May 1915	Brigadier-General	T.T. Pitman (sick 8–16 December 1916, leave 17–29 December 1916)
8 December 1916	Lieutenant-Colonel	S.R. Kirby (acting)
17 December 1916	Lieutenant-Colonel	A. Dugdale (acting)
30 December 1916	Brigadier-General	T.T. Pitman
24 March 1918	Lieutenant-Colonel	S.R. Kirby (acting)
9 April 1918	Brigadier-General	C.H. Rankin

The 4th Cavalry Brigade had the following commanders during the Second World War:

From	Rank	Name
23 October 1939	Brigadier	J.J. Kingstone
28 June 1940	Lieutenant-Colonel	A.A. McBean (acting)
2 July 1940	Brigadier	J.J. Kingstone
27 February 1941	Lieutenant-Colonel	A.H. Ferguson (acting)
9 May 1941	Brigadier	J.J. Kingstone
29 June 1941	Brigadier	J.G.E. Tiarks

== See also ==
- Order of battle of the Waterloo Campaign
- British Army during World War I
- British Cavalry Corps order of battle 1914
- British cavalry during the First World War
- List of British brigades of the Second World War

== Bibliography ==
- Becke, Archibald F. (1935). Order of Battle of Divisions Part 1–The Regular British Divisions. London: HMSO. OCLC 4405016.
- Bellis, Malcolm A. (1994). Regiments of the British Army 1939–1945 (Armour & Infantry). London: Military Press International. ISBN 0-85420-999-9.
- Clarke, W.G. (1993). Horse Gunners: The Royal Horse Artillery, 200 Years of Panache and Professionalism. Woolwich: The Royal Artillery Institution. ISBN 09520762-0-9.
- Haythornthwaite, Philip J. (1990). The Napoleonic Source Book. London: Guild Publishing.
- James, Brigadier E.A. (1978). British Regiments 1914–18. London: Samson Books Limited. ISBN 0-906304-03-2.
- Joslen, H. F. (2003) [1960]. Orders of Battle: Second World War, 1939–1945. Uckfield, East Sussex: Naval and Military Press. ISBN 978-1-84342-474-1.
- Mileham, Patrick (1994). The Yeomanry Regiments; 200 Years of Tradition. Edinburgh: Canongate Academic. ISBN 1-898410-36-4.
- Reid, Stuart (2004). Wellington's Army in the Peninsula 1809–14. Vol. 2 of Battle Orders Series. Oxford: Osprey Publishing. ISBN 1-84176-517-1.
- Smith, Digby (1998). The Greenhill Napoleonic Wars Data Book. London: Greenhill Books. ISBN 1-85367-276-9.
