= G Parachute Battery (Mercer's Troop) Royal Horse Artillery =

British Army airborne artillery battery

- Active: 1 September 1801 – present
- Country: United Kingdom
- Branch: British Army
- Type: Parachute Artillery
- Role: Close support
- Size: Battery
- Part of: 7th Parachute Regiment Royal Horse Artillery
- Garrison/HQ: Merville Barracks, Colchester, Essex, England
- Anniversaries: Waterloo Day 18 June
- Equipment: L118 Light Gun
- Engagements: Napoleonic Wars; Second Boer War; First World War; Second World War; Battle of Magersfontein; Operation Telic; Operation Herrick
- Battle honours: Ubique

Commanders
- Notable commanders: Cavalié Mercer

G Parachute Battery (Mercer's Troop) Royal Horse Artillery is a close support battery of 7th Parachute Regiment Royal Horse Artillery, part of the Royal Horse Artillery of the British Army, currently based in Merville Barracks in Colchester.

Formed in 1801, the battery has taken part in the Napoleonic Wars (notably the Battle of Waterloo where it earned its Honour Title as Mercer's Troop), the Indian Mutiny, the Second Boer War and the First and Second World Wars.

In 1961, it was given a parachute role as part of 7th Parachute Regiment Royal Horse Artillery and has seen considerable active service particularly in Northern Ireland (Operation Banner), the Balkans, Afghanistan and Iraq.

== History ==
=== Napoleonic Wars ===
The battery was formed on 1 September 1801 as G Troop, Horse Artillery at Mallow, County Cork, Ireland as a horse artillery battery of the British Army. It was involved in the capture of Buenos Aires in 1806.

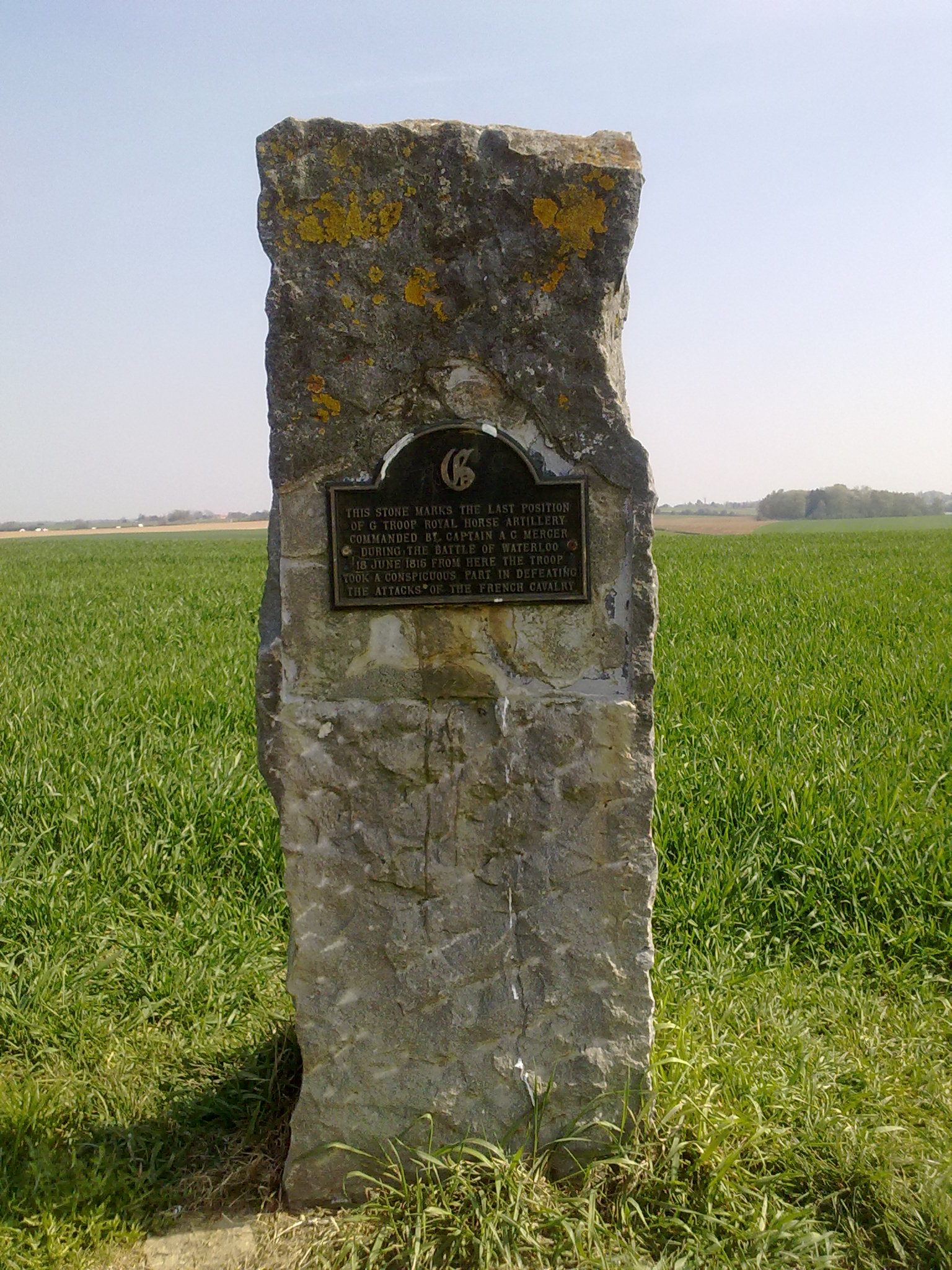
Memorial stone marking the position where Mercer's troop fought French cavalry on the Waterloo battlefield.

The troop's best known action during the Napoleonic Wars came in June 1815 at the Battle of Waterloo. Under the command of Captain Mercer, the battery was equipped with five 9 pounder cannons and a 5½" howitzer. (Note: Other sources state that the battery was armed exclusively with 9 pounder cannons.) Initially placed on the right, it was ordered to assist in repelling an attack by French cavalry at the centre of the allied line. It beat off repeated charges by the French, disobeying previously issued orders from the Duke of Wellington that gunners were to abandon the guns and take refuge inside nearby infantry squares as the enemy closed. In commemoration of this action, the troop was named after Mercer. (Note: The Honour Title "Mercer's Troop" was officially granted on 13 October 1926.)

In the usual post-war reductions of the British Army, a number of troops of horse artillery were disbanded between 1815 and 1816, including D Troop (Beane's Troop) on 31 July 1816. The remaining troops were then moved up to assume the next available letter and the G Troop became F Troop on the same date.

=== Indian Mutiny ===
The troop was dispatched to India in 1858 to assist in the final operations to quell the Indian Rebellion of 1857. From 1 July 1859, while still in Bengal, it was assigned to the Horse Brigade, Royal Artillery along with all the existing horse artillery batteries of the Royal Artillery. This was an administrative, rather than tactical, formation.

As a result of the Rebellion, the British Crown took direct control of India from the East India Company on 1 November 1858 under the provisions of the Government of India Act 1858. The Presidency armies transferred to the direct authority of the British Crown and its European units were transferred to the British Army. Henceforth artillery, the mutineers most effective arm, was to be the sole preserve of the British Army (with the exception of certain Mountain Artillery batteries). On 19 February 1862, the Horse Brigade RA became the 1st Horse Brigade RA and the Bengal, Madras and Bombay horse artillery formed the 2nd to 5th Horse Brigades. (Note: The 1st Brigade Bengal Horse Artillery became 2nd Horse Brigade RA, the Madras Horse Artillery became 3rd Horse Brigade RA, the Bombay Horse Artillery became 4th Horse Brigade RA and the 2nd Brigade Bengal Horse Artillery became 5th Horse Brigade RA. The 3rd Brigade Bengal Horse Artillery was split between 2nd and 5th Horse Brigades RA.)

=== Late Victorian era ===
The 1st Brigade with 10 batteries was much larger than the other four (with four to seven batteries each). Therefore, a reorganization of the Horse Artillery on 13 April 1864 saw 1st Brigade split as A and B Brigades. (Note: At the same time, 2nd Brigade become C Brigade, 3rd become D Brigade, 4th become E Brigade, and 5th become F Brigade.) The battery was moved to B Brigade, and as battery designations were tied to the brigade the battery was assigned to, it was redesignated as C Battery, B Brigade (or C/B Battery in short).

From 1866, the term "Royal Horse Artillery" appeared in Army List hence the battery was designated C Battery, B Brigade, Royal Horse Artillery from about this time. Another reorganization on 14 April 1877 saw the number of brigades reduced to three (of 10 batteries each); the battery joined A Brigade and became G Battery, A Brigade. The number of brigades was further reduced to two (of 13 batteries each) in 1882 without effecting the designation of the battery.

The brigade system was finally abolished on 1 July 1889. Henceforth, batteries were designated in a single alphabetical sequence in order of seniority from date of formation and the battery took on its final designation as G Battery, Royal Horse Artillery.

Equipped with six 12 pounders, the battery was sent to South Africa with the 2nd Cavalry Brigade (Note: Of the 10 RHA batteries that took part in the Second Boer War: A, J and M Batteries were unbrigaded; Q, T and U Batteries were assigned to 1st Cavalry Brigade; G and P Batteries were assigned to 2nd Cavalry Brigade; O and R Batteries were assigned to 3rd Cavalry Brigade) and saw active service in the Second Boer War including the Battle of Magersfontein (11 December 1899) and the Battle of Paardeberg (27 February 1900).

=== First World War ===
The brigade system was reintroduced on 1 March 1901, this time as tactical formations, and the battery was assigned to the XI Brigade-Division, RHA (redesignated as V Brigade, RHA on 1 October 1906) along with O Battery and was stationed at Ambala.

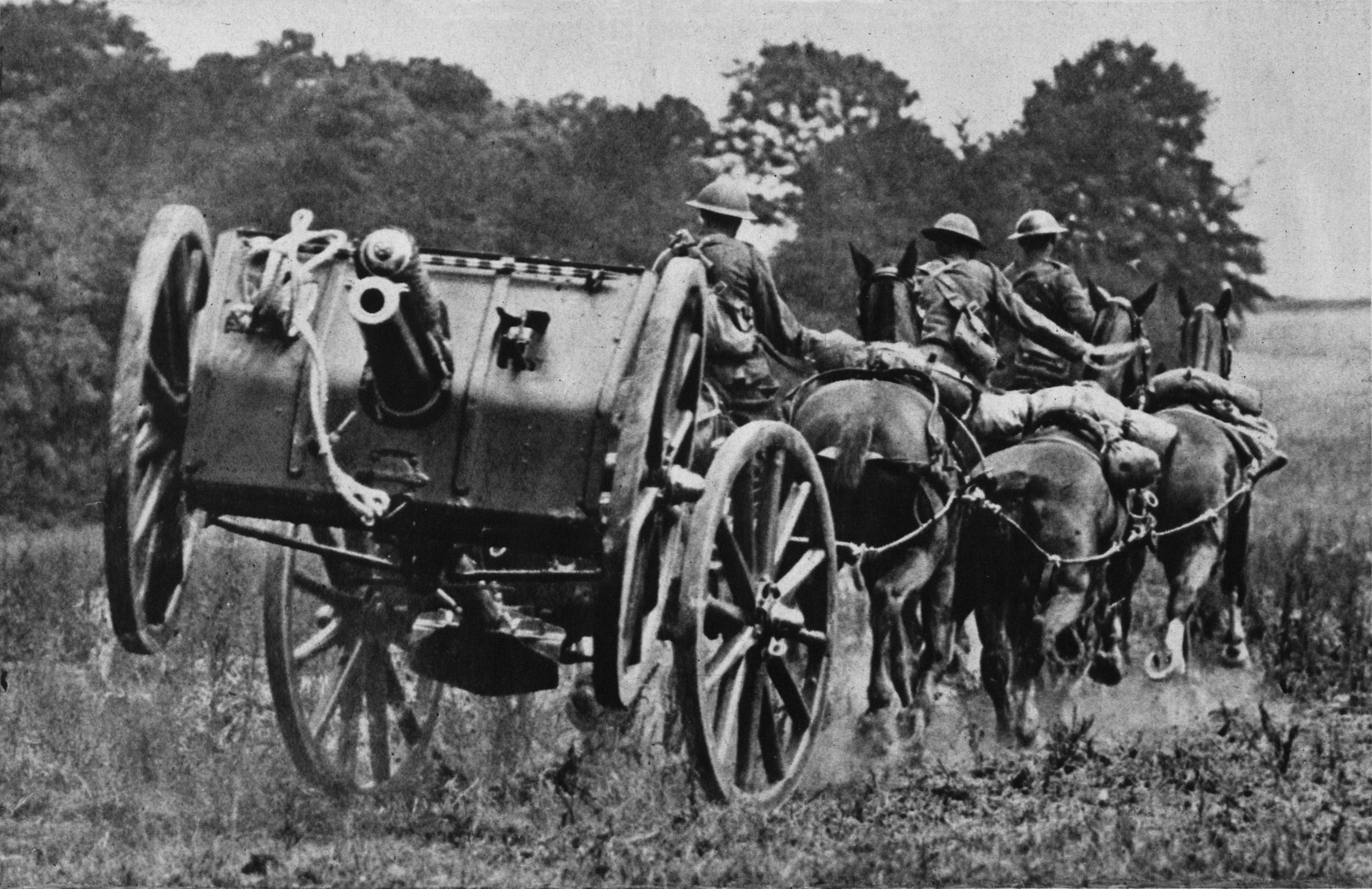
Photo showing 13 pounder gun team galloping into action.

By the time the First World War broke out, the battery had been re-equipped with six quick-firing 13 pounders and was stationed at Ipswich, still assigned to V Brigade with O Battery and attached to the 5th Cavalry Brigade. On 9 October 1914, the newly reformed Z Battery, RHA joined the brigade and they joined 8th Division when it was formed at Winchester. With 8th Division, it crossed to France on 4 and 5 November 1914 (landing at Le Havre on 6 and 7 November).

On 24 November 1914, G Battery was transferred to XV (later IV) Brigade, RHA in 3rd Cavalry Division. In practice, the batteries were permanently assigned to the cavalry brigades and G Battery served with 8th Cavalry Brigade. It joined too late to take part in any of the 1914 actions, but in 1915 saw action in the Second Battle of Ypres (Battle of Frezenberg Ridge, 11–13 May) and the Battle of Loos (26–28 September). 1916 saw no notable actions, but in 1917 it took part in the Battle of Arras (First Battle of the Scarpe, 9–12 April). At other times, the battery served in the trenches as infantry.

In March 1918, the 4th (formerly 1st Indian) and 5th (formerly 2nd Indian) Cavalry Divisions were broken up in France. The Indian elements were sent to Egypt where they formed part of the new 4th and 5th Cavalry Divisions which played a major part in the successful conclusion of the Sinai and Palestine Campaign. The British and Canadian units remained in France and most of them were transferred to the 3rd Cavalry Division causing it to be extensively reorganized.

In March 1918, 8th Cavalry Brigade was broken up. It was replaced in 3rd Cavalry Division by the Canadian Cavalry Brigade with its attached Royal Canadian Horse Artillery Brigade (A and B Batteries, RCHA each with four 13 pounders) from the disbanding 5th Cavalry Division. On 13 March, G Battery was posted to XVII Brigade, RHA (formerly with 5th Cavalry Division) to bring it back up to three batteries.

This was a short-lived arrangement: on 9 April, G and N Batteries left for V Army Brigade RHA. (Note: Army Brigades, RHA and RFA were artillery brigades that were excess to the needs of the divisions, withdrawn to form an artillery reserve.) At some point, the battery was re-armed with 18 pounders. At the Armistice, V Army Brigade RHA was serving as Army Troops with the Fourth Army with G, N, O and Z Batteries RHA (twenty four 18 pounders).

=== Inter-war period ===
The battery took part in the Victory Parade in Paris in July 1919, and returned to the United Kingdom (Aldershot) from Germany in October. Still assigned to V Brigade, it remained at Aldershot until November 1926 when it was transferred to Meerut. In 1927, V Brigade was broken up and the battery remained at Meerut, unbrigaded.

The battery remained horsed until it departed India in 1939; in May it transferred to Egypt along with C and F Batteries. On arrival at Helmieh on 28 May, they formed 4th Regiment, Royal Horse Artillery.

From 1938 artillery regiments were reorganized from three six-gun batteries to two 12-gun batteries. Rather than disband existing batteries, they were instead linked in pairs. As a result, G Battery was linked with F Battery to form F/G Battery on 28 May 1939. (Note: After linking RHA batteries in pairs, just C Battery with 4th Regiment, Royal Horse Artillery in Egypt and K Battery at St John's Wood Barracks remained unlinked.) In the event, the batteries were unlinked within months (on 25 November 1939) and the battery resumed its individual existence.

=== Second World War ===
At the outbreak of the Second World War, the battery was still linked with F Battery as F/G Battery in 4th Regiment, RHA and still in Egypt. It was unlinked on 25 November 1939 and simultaneously assigned to the 5th Regiment, RHA at Wotton-under-Edge, Gloucestershire. It remained part of 5th RHA for the rest of the war.

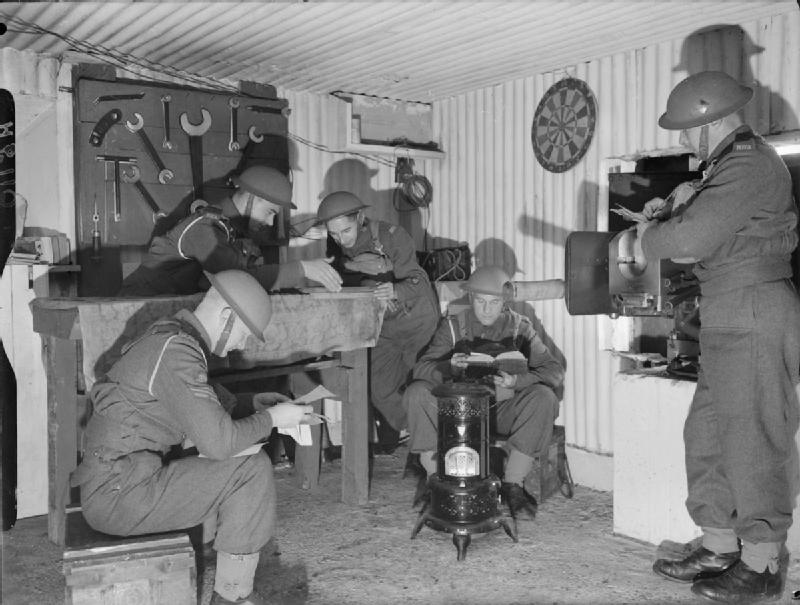
Gunners of 'G' Battery (Mercer's Troop), Royal Horse Artillery, inside a pillbox, 29 October 1940 (IWM H5110)

In 1940, the 5th RHA formed part of the British Expeditionary Force in France. After being evacuated at Dunkirk it joined Home Forces in the United Kingdom before being assigned to the 8th Support Group, 8th Armoured Division. On 8 May 1942, it departed the United Kingdom to take part in the North African Campaign. It arrived in Egypt on 18 July – the long sea journey being due to transiting via the Cape of Good Hope. 8th Armoured Division never operated as a complete formation and the regiment served with 23rd Armoured Brigade Group (Defence of the El Alamein Line and the Battle of Alam el Halfa) and 24th Armoured Brigade Group (Battle of El Alamein).

On 1 December 1942, it joined 7th Armoured Division and remained with it for the rest of the war. It took part in the rest of the Western Desert Campaign, the Tunisian Campaign and, briefly, the Italian Campaign (9 September – 15 October 1943). It returned to the United Kingdom in January 1944 to prepare for the invasion of Europe. It fought in the North-West Europe Campaign from 8 July 1944 through to the end of the war.

=== Post-war ===
Post-war, the battery remained part of the 5th RHA, equipped with Sexton 25 pounder self-propelled guns. It was stationed variously as Osnabrück, Larkhill and Cwrt y Gollen, Crickhowell. In February 1958, 5th RHA reverted to the Royal Artillery as 5th Field Regiment, RA and the battery was transferred to 4th RHA in exchange for P Battery. It was now equipped with Cardinal 155 mm self-propelled guns and stationed at Hohne.

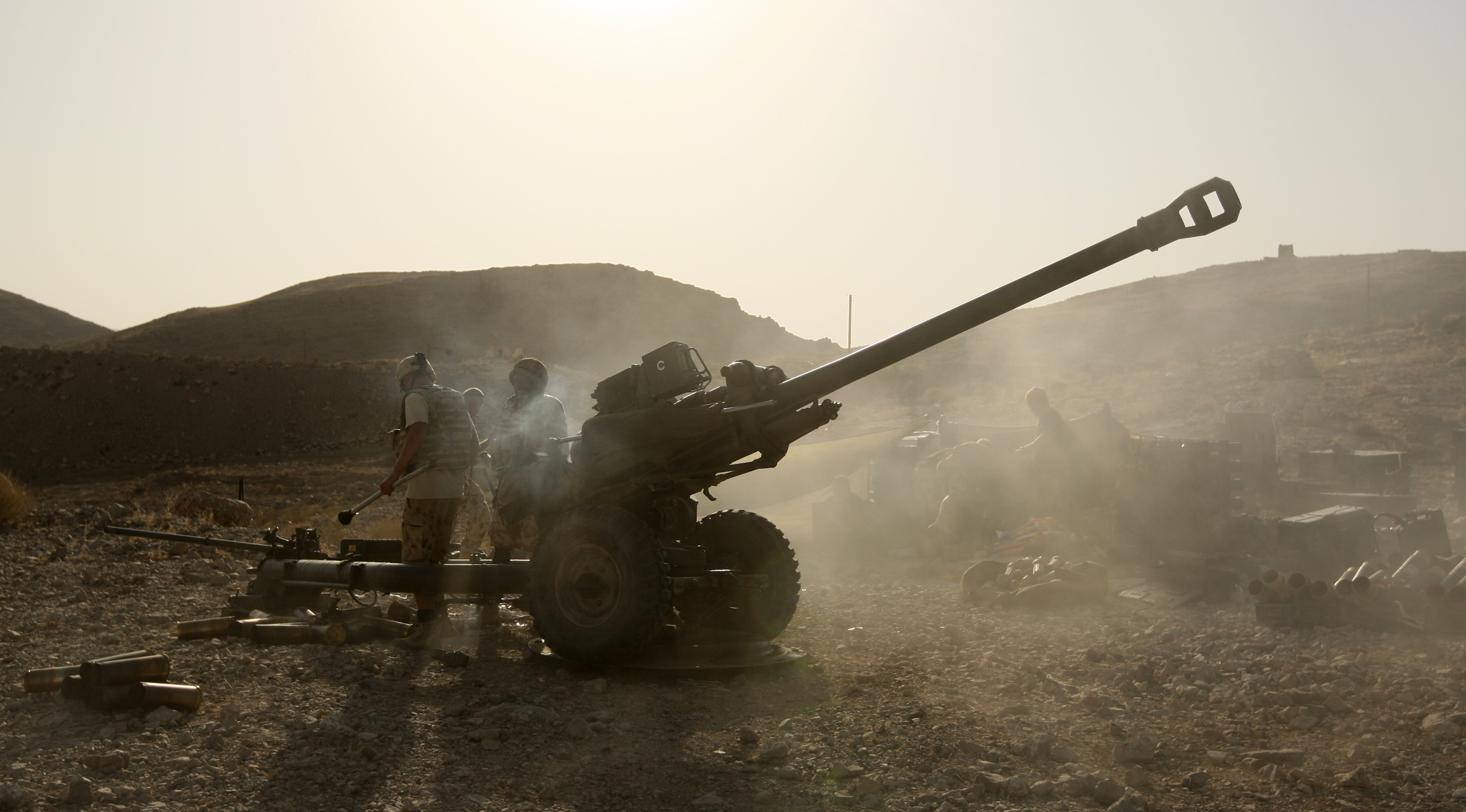
ISAF soldiers with 7th Parachute Regiment Royal Horse Artillery fire their 105 mm Light Gun at Taliban positions. Kajaki, Afghanistan, 28 August 2008

In 1961, it was decided to convert 33rd Parachute Light Regiment RA into a RHA regiment. As a result, 4th RHA reverted to the Royal Artillery as 4th Regiment Royal Artillery and its three batteries – F, G and I – were transferred to 7th Parachute Regiment Royal Horse Artillery on 27 June 1961. Initially equipped with the 105 mm Pack Howitzer, in 1974 the battery (and regiment) was re-armed with the L118 light gun which remains its equipment.

Other than a period from 1977 to 1984 when the battery (and the regiment) was rerolled as a field artillery unit and posted to the BAOR in Germany, it has been based in England, initially at Aldershot but latterly at Colchester.

Since 1961, it has been posted to Kuwait in 1961, Aden in 1964, a number of roulement tours to Northern Ireland (Operation Banner) in the infantry role, Cyprus as part of UNFICYP (June to December 1994), Bosnia in December 1996, Macedonia and Kosovo (Operation Agricola) in June 1999, Sierra Leone (Operation Silkman) in May 2000, Afghanistan (Operation Jacana) in 2001 and 2002, the Gulf War (Operation Telic) from March 2003, Kosovo 2004 (Operation Occulus) and Afghanistan again (Operation Herrick) in 2008 and 2010.

Operation Pitting. In August 2021, members of G Bty TAC Group (held at high readiness), deployed to Kabul in Afghanistan. This was to aid in the extraction of British Nationals, following the rapid Taliban advance across the country and into the city. Over 15,000 eligible Afghans and British Nationals successfully evacuated, in an operation that marked the end of the UK’s 20-year military campaign in Afghanistan.

== See also ==
- British Army
- Royal Artillery
- Royal Horse Artillery
- List of Royal Artillery Batteries

== Bibliography ==
- Becke, Archibald F. (1935). Order of Battle of Divisions Part 1–The Regular British Divisions. London: HMSO. OCLC 4405016.
- Clarke, W.G. (1993). Horse Gunners: The Royal Horse Artillery, 200 Years of Panache and Professionalism. Woolwich: The Royal Artillery Institution. ISBN 09520762-0-9.
- Frederick, J.B.M. (1984). Lineage Book of British Land Forces 1660–1978. Wakefield, Yorkshire: Microform Academic Publishers. ISBN 1-85117-009-X.
- Joslen, Lt-Col H.F. (1990) [1st. Pub. HMSO:1960]. Orders of Battle, Second World War, 1939–1945. London: London Stamp Exchange. ISBN 0-948130-03-2.
- Perry, F.W. (1993). Order of Battle of Divisions Part 5B. Indian Army Divisions. Newport: Ray Westlake Military Books. ISBN 1-871167-23-X.
- Order of Battle of the British Armies in France, November 11th, 1918. France: General Staff, GHQ. 1918.
