= Leicestershire Yeomanry =

The Leicestershire Yeomanry (Prince Albert's Own)
- Cap badge of The Leicestershire Yeomanry (P.A.O)
- Active: 1794–1802; 1803–1957
- Country: Kingdom of Great Britain (1795–1800); United Kingdom (1801–1957)
- Branch: British Army
- Type: Yeomanry
- Size: Regiment
- HQ: Leicester
- Nickname: Albert Lads
- Patron: Albert, Prince Consort
- Motto: "vultus en hostem" face the enemy
- March: Regimental March by Henry Nicholson jnr (1825-1907)
- Mascots: Veld Baboon, "Adonse", from 1901 until his demise. Buried in Woodhouse Eves, Leicestershire.
- Engagements: Second Boer War; First World War France and Flanders 1914–18 Second World War North Africa 1942–43 Italy 1944–45 North-West Europe 1944–45
- Battle honours: See battle honours below

The Leicestershire Yeomanry (Prince Albert's Own) was a yeomanry regiment of the British Army, first raised in 1794 and again in 1803, which provided cavalry and mounted infantry in the Second Boer War and the First World War and provided two field artillery regiments of the Royal Artillery in the Second World War, before being amalgamated with the Derbyshire Yeomanry to form the Leicestershire and Derbyshire (Prince Albert's Own) Yeomanry in 1957. The regiment's lineage is currently perpetuated by E (Leicestershire and Derbyshire Yeomanry) Squadron of the Royal Yeomanry.

== History ==
=== Original formation and early history ===
During the crisis of 1794, when there were grave fears of a French invasion, the government pressed for the formation of volunteer corps across the country, and in April 1794, letters were circulated to the Lords Lieutenant of each county instructing them to raise regiments of yeomanry. In Leicestershire, a meeting was held at the Three Crowns Inn in Leicester on 10 April, where the details were organised and a list of subscribers who were willing to provide funds made out. The colonelcy was given to Sir William Skeffington, a retired Major in the Grenadier Guards, dated 9 May, and he and Captain Curzon kissed the King's hand on 11 June to report that they had raised their full complement of men. The regiment paraded in six troops on 4 July to receive their standards.

With the Peace of Amiens, the regiment was disbanded in 1802.

=== Nineteenth century ===
The regiment was re-raised in September 1803, as the Leicestershire Yeomanry Cavalry. Sir William was still considered the colonel, indicating that this was considered a reformation and not simply a newly raised regiment. On 1 November, he resigned the colonelcy and was succeeded by Lieutenant-Colonel George Keck of Bank Hall (Colonel of the regiment from 1803 to 11 January 1860).

From 1825, when the Rutland Legion was disbanded, the Leicestershire Yeomanry recruited from Rutland as well as Leicestershire.

The regiment was mobilised to keep the peace on a number of occasions, such as its service at Derby in October 1831; workers in the city had rioted after the Reform Bill was rejected by the House of Lords, and the yeomanry was called in to help the regular army and the Derbyshire Yeomanry maintain order.

The regiment was renamed for Prince Albert, the Prince Consort, in 1844. (Note: Her Majesty has been graciously pleased to approve of the Leicestershire Regiment of Yeomanry Cavalry being designated by the title of "The Prince Albert's Own.")

=== Second Boer War ===
The Yeomanry was not intended to serve overseas, but due to the string of defeats during Black Week in December 1899, the British government realized they were going to need more troops than just the regular army. A Royal Warrant was issued on 24 December 1899 to allow volunteer forces to serve in the Second Boer War. The Royal Warrant asked standing Yeomanry regiments to provide service companies of approximately 115 men each for the Imperial Yeomanry. The regiment provided the 7th (Leicestershire) Company for the 4th Battalion and the 65th (Leicestershire) Company for the 17th Battalion in 1900.

In 1901, it was reorganized as mounted infantry as the Leicestershire (Prince Albert's Own) Imperial Yeomanry. In 1908, it was transferred into the Territorial Force, returning to a cavalry role and equipping as hussars, under the new title of The Leicestershire (Prince Albert's Own) Yeomanry. The regiment was based at the Magazine in Leicester at this time.

=== First World War ===
In accordance with the Territorial and Reserve Forces Act 1907 (7 Edw. 7, c.9) which brought the Territorial Force into being, the TF was intended to be a home defence force for service during wartime and members could not be compelled to serve outside the country. However, on the outbreak of war on 4 August 1914, many members volunteered for Imperial Service. Therefore, TF units were split in August and September 1914 into 1st Line (liable for overseas service) and 2nd Line (home service for those unable or unwilling to serve overseas) units. Later, a 3rd Line was formed to act as a reserve, providing trained replacements for the 1st and 2nd Line regiments.

==== 1/1st Leicestershire Yeomanry ====
With the outbreak of the First World War in 1914, the regiment mobilised in the North Midland Mounted Brigade and moved to France in November joining the 3rd Cavalry Division. As such, it was one of only six yeomanry regiments to be posted to a regular cavalry division in the war. (Note: The other five were: Bedfordshire Yeomanry in 1st Cavalry Division; Queen's Own Oxfordshire Hussars in 2nd Cavalry Division; North Somerset Yeomanry in 3rd Cavalry Division; Essex Yeomanry also in 3rd Cavalry Division.; Queen's Own Yorkshire Dragoons in 4th Cavalry Division) It saw service at the First Battle of Ypres in 1914 and the Second Battle of Ypres in 1915. At Second Ypres, the regiment gained battle honours for the Battle of St Julien and the Battle of Frezenberg, where a squadron of the regiment held the line for its entire brigade.

===== Battle of Frezenberg =====
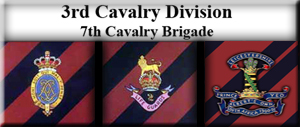
1st Life Guards, 2nd Life Guards and The Leicestershire (P.A.O) Yeomanry

At Frezenberg, they went into action in the trenches on 12 May as dismounted infantry, numbering 291 all ranks, alongside the 1st Life Guards (left in line) and 2nd Life Guards (middle in line). The Leicestershire Yeomanry (right in line), B and C Squadrons took up forward positions in the advanced trenches, with A Squadron to the rear in support trenches (approx 350 yards behind and positioned to the left side of the forward squadrons' trenches).

The regiment suffered heavy shellfire through the morning, though with light casualties, until around 6am, the German infantry opposite launched an attack, which was quickly repulsed; shelling resumed until about 7:30, covering a German infiltration of advanced trenches which had been vacated by the 2nd Life Guards. The Germans began to press on B Squadron, forcing them south and west along their trenches, and driving them back into the C Squadron trenches. The squadrons were rallied by the commander of C Squadron, Major Martin, who, the regimental diary records, "by his undaunted courage and example got his men to make a great stand against large odds". Martin was killed holding the trench line, and at this point, the survivors remaining in the forward trenches fell back – numbering a lieutenant, the squadron sergeant-major, and fourteen men. They fell back towards a railway line in the rear, and reached trenches held by the 3rd Dragoon Guards; they remained in the line here until 8 pm, when the 3rd Dragoon Guards withdrew.

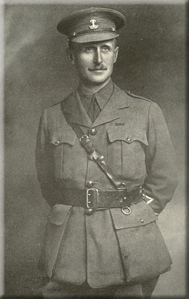
Lt.Col.The Hon. Percy Cecil Evans-Freke

A Squadron, meanwhile, had held the support trench under strong shellfire until 5:30 am, when they began to fall back towards the road behind the trenches. They were met part-way by the regimental commander, Lt. Colonel The Hon. Percy Cecil Evans-Freke, the second-in-command and the adjutant. The Colonel shouted "Hold hard Leicester Yeomanry!" and A squadron halted and returned to the support trench. The Colonel was killed directing the defence of the trench, and arranging a post to guard the flank of the 1st Life Guards, shortly before the attack at 7:30 am. This attack was held off by A Squadron, and the line stabilised with the Germans digging in close to the trenches.

At 8 pm, a messenger from 7th Cavalry Brigade HQ informed the acting commander that A Squadron was "the only squadron holding the section of trench originally occupied by 7th Brigade", and that they were to hold the line until a counterattack could be mounted. By the morning of the 13th, seven officers – including the regimental commander and two of three squadron commanders – and 87 other ranks had been killed; the unwounded numbered only 92 other ranks. The counterattack, launched the next afternoon at 2:30 pm by 8th Cavalry Brigade, was a success. The Yeomanry managed to muster around forty men, led by the Brigade Major, for the bayonet charge, and retook some of the trenches formerly held by B squadron and the Life Guards – those held by C squadron had collapsed under heavy fire.

===== 1917 and 1918 =====
After being heavily depleted in Second Ypres, the regiment did not see significant action throughout 1916; in 1917, it saw action at the Battle of Arras and the Battle of the Scarpe. In March 1918, it was withdrawn from the division and ordered to reform as a cyclist battalion, later countermanded in favour of amalgamation with the North Somerset Yeomanry as a machine-gun battalion. However, the offensives of 1918 provided a need for cavalry units, and before the regiment could amalgamate it was remounted and sent to the 3rd Cavalry Brigade of 2nd Cavalry Division, where it was split up to provide reinforcements. One squadron of the regiment was sent to each of the Brigade's constituent regiments – C Sqn, LY to the 4th (Queen's Own) Hussars, A Squadron, Leicestershire Yeomanry to the 5th (Royal Irish) Lancers and B Squadron, Leicestershire Yeomanry to the 16th (The Queen's) Lancers. These saw action in the Battle of Amiens, the Battle of the Hindenburg Line, and the Pursuit to Mons, for each of which the regiment received a battle honour.

==== 2/1st Leicestershire Yeomanry ====
The 2nd Line regiment, which was formed in 1914, joined the 2/1st North Midland Mounted Brigade in 1915. In October, the brigade joined the 1st Mounted Division in Norfolk, replacing the 1st Line brigade. On 31 March 1916, the remaining Mounted Brigades were ordered to be numbered in a single sequence and the brigade became the 3rd Mounted Brigade.

In July 1916, there was a major reorganization of 2nd Line yeomanry units in the United Kingdom. All but 12 regiments were converted to cyclists and as a consequence the regiment was dismounted and joined the 3rd Cyclist Brigade (and the division became 1st Cyclist Division) in the Holt area.

A further reorganization in November 1916 saw the regiment remounted along with the rest of the brigade, which was redesignated as the new 2nd Mounted Brigade in the new 1st Mounted Division (originally 3rd Mounted Division) at Stansted. By May 1917, it was at Leybourne near West Malling in Kent.

The regiment was once again converted to cyclists in August 1917 and joined 12th Cyclist Brigade in The Cyclist Division. By January 1918, it had moved to Canterbury where it remained until the end of the war.

==== 3/1st Leicestershire Yeomanry ====
The 3rd Line regiment was formed in 1915 and in the summer was affiliated to a Reserve Cavalry Regiment at Aldershot. In the summer of 1916, it was affiliated to the 12th Reserve Cavalry Regiment, also at Aldershot. In early 1917, it was absorbed into the 3rd Reserve Cavalry Regiment, still at Aldershot.

=== Between the wars ===
Post war, a commission was set up to consider the shape of the Territorial Force (Territorial Army from 1 October 1921). The experience of the First World War made it clear that cavalry was surfeit. The commission decided that only the 14 most senior regiments were to be retained as cavalry (though the Lovat Scouts and the Scottish Horse were also to remain mounted as "scouts"). Eight regiments were converted to Armoured Car Companies of the Royal Tank Corps (RTC), one was reduced to a battery in another regiment, one was absorbed into a local infantry battalion, one became a signals regiment and two were disbanded. The remaining 25 regiments were converted to brigades (Note: The basic organic unit of the Royal Artillery was, and is, the Battery. When grouped together they formed brigades, in the same way that infantry battalions or cavalry regiments were grouped together in brigades. At the outbreak of the First World War, a field artillery brigade of headquarters (4 officers, 37 other ranks), three batteries (5 and 193 each), and a brigade ammunition column (4 and 154) had a total strength just under 800 so was broadly comparable to an infantry battalion (just over 1,000) or a cavalry regiment (about 550). Like an infantry battalion, an artillery brigade was usually commanded by a Lieutenant-Colonel. Artillery brigades were redesignated as regiments in 1938.) of the Royal Field Artillery between 1920 and 1922. As the 10th most senior regiment in the order of precedence, the regiment was retained as horsed cavalry.

=== Second World War ===
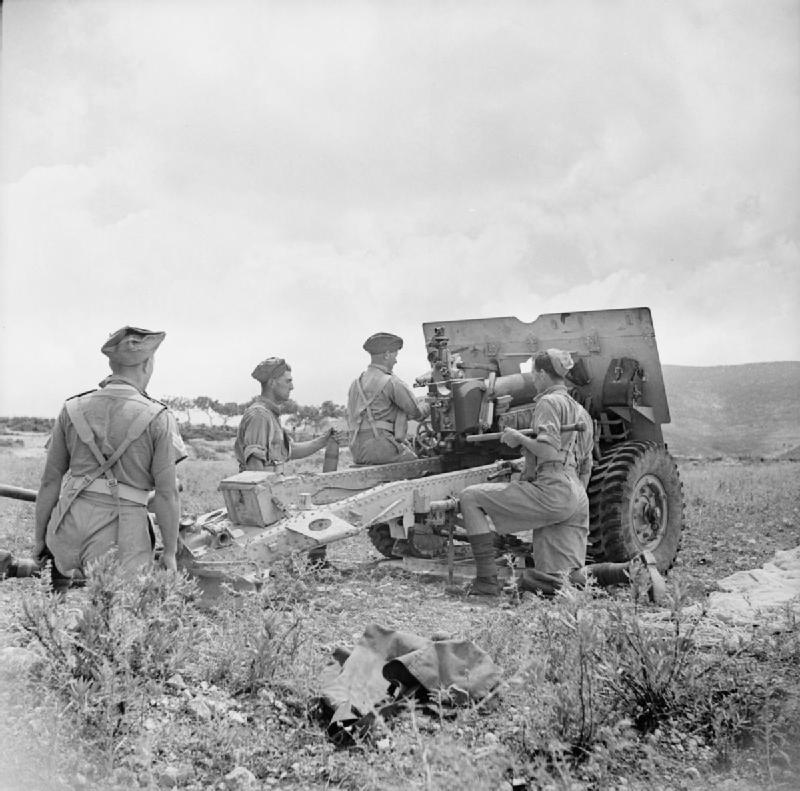
A 25-pdr field gun of 153rd Field Regiment during a practice shoot in June 1943.

The regiment did not mechanise before the outbreak of the Second World War, and continued to train for service as horsed cavalry. In early 1939, it was authorised by the War Office to recruit up to its full wartime establishment, and with a heavy drive this was reached in May, with a headquarters squadron and three sabre squadrons. As part of the Cavalry Corps, which by now consisted almost entirely of Yeomanry units, it was assigned a wartime role as part of the 6th Cavalry Brigade in the 1st Cavalry Division. However, in the summer of 1939, the divisional organisation was slightly reorganised, and the regiment switched roles with the Cheshire Yeomanry to become the divisional cavalry regiment. In late 1939, it was decided to send the division overseas to Palestine, and convert the seven remaining yeomanry regiments not assigned to the division into artillery regiments. However, a dedicated cavalry regiment was apparently considered surplus to requirements in the Cavalry Division, and the Leicestershire Yeomanry was removed from its role and assigned for conversion along with the other regiments. It chose the field artillery role, and in early 1940 was split into two halves in order to form two separate regiments. In February 1940, the first unit was formed in the Royal Artillery as 153rd (Leicestershire Yeomanry) Field Regiment, Royal Artillery, with the second, 154th (Leicestershire Yeomanry) Field Regiment, Royal Artillery, forming on 15 April 1940.

When the Guards Armoured Division was formed in the early autumn of 1941, the 153rd became part of the Guards Support Group. That structure disappeared in the changes of mid-1942, and the 153rd were part of the Division as it fought its way across northern France until the German surrender. The 154th was moved to North Africa in 1942, then to Persia and Iraq Command in January 1943 with the 6th Indian Infantry Division. It moved back to North Africa in April, and was assigned to the 10th Indian Infantry Division, with which it would serve through the North African campaign and the Italian campaign. In July 1945, it was with the British 78th Infantry Division, part of the occupying forces in Austria.

=== Post-war ===
A Comet Tank of the Leicestershire (P.A.O) Yeomanry c1950

After the War, the regiment reconstituted in the Territorial Army as a yeomanry regiment, under its old title of The Leicestershire Yeomanry (The Prince Albert's Own), and transferred into the Royal Armoured Corps as a Hussar Regiment equipped with Comet Tanks. In 1952, the Leicestershire (PAO) Yeomanry was re-designated as an Anti-Tank Regiment, still in AFVs, and remained as such until late 1956. In 1957, the regiment was amalgamated with the Derbyshire Yeomanry, forming the Leicestershire and Derbyshire Yeomanry. The Leicestershire (PAO) Yeomanry enjoyed a long and close affiliation with the 7th Queen's Own Hussars from 1915 to 1956.

== Battle honours ==
The Leicestershire Yeomanry was awarded the following battle honours (honours in bold are emblazoned on the regimental colours):

Second Boer War	**South Africa 1900–02**	Honorary Distinction from the Second World War, awarded to the Shropshire Yeomanry for service as a Royal Artillery regiment. The Leicestershire Yeomanry Honorary Distinction was similar.
First World War	**Ypres 1914** **'15**, **St. Julien**, **Frezenberg**, **Arras 1917**, **Scarpe 1917**, **Amiens**, **Hindenburg Line**, **Canal du Nord**, **Pursuit to Mons**, **France and Flanders 1914–18**	Honorary Distinction from the Second World War, awarded to the Shropshire Yeomanry for service as a Royal Artillery regiment. The Leicestershire Yeomanry Honorary Distinction was similar.
Second World War	The Royal Artillery was present in nearly all battles and would have earned most of the honours awarded to cavalry and infantry regiments. In 1833, William IV awarded the motto Ubique (meaning "everywhere") in place of all battle honours. Honorary Distinction: Badge of the Royal Regiment of Artillery with year-dates "1942, '44–45" and three scrolls: "North-West Europe", "North Africa" and "Italy"	Honorary Distinction from the Second World War, awarded to the Shropshire Yeomanry for service as a Royal Artillery regiment. The Leicestershire Yeomanry Honorary Distinction was similar.

== Uniform ==
Prior to 1914, officers of the regiment wore in review order a hussar style uniform comprising a busby with white over scarlet plume, a short dark blue jacket with scarlet collar and cuffs laced and braided in silver, and dark blue overalls (tight cavalry breeches) with double scarlet stripes. Other ranks substituted a dark blue peaked cap for the busby and white braiding for the silver of the officers' uniform. This elaborate dress continued to be worn between the wars by officers attending Court levees and is still worn by the Guidon Party of the modern B Squadron (LBY) on ceremonial occasions. Normal service dress for all ranks was khaki from 1903 onwards, initially worn with scarlet facings.

== See also ==
- Imperial Yeomanry
- List of Yeomanry Regiments 1908
- Yeomanry
- Yeomanry order of precedence
- British yeomanry during the First World War
- Second line yeomanry regiments of the British Army
- List of British Army Yeomanry Regiments converted to Royal Artillery

== Further resources ==
=== Regiment-specific works ===
A general history of the regiment was published after the First World War, and regimental histories of both field artillery regiments were published after the Second. A more recent general study of the volunteer movement has focused on Leicestershire and Rutland as its examples, and as such deals with the Leicestershire Yeomanry in some detail. The Loughborough War Memorial Museum contains a display of material relating to the Leicestershire Yeomanry.

- Codrington, Col. G.R. – An outline of the history of the Leicestershire (Prince Albert's Own) Yeomanry. Arden Press, London, 1928.
- Brassey, Bernard & Winslow, P.D. – 153rd Leicestershire Yeomanry Field Regiment R.A., T.A. 1939-1945. W.Pickering & Sons, Hinckley, 1947
- Bouskell-Wade, Lt. Col. G.E. – "There is an Honour Likewise..." The Story of 154 (Leicestershire Yeomanry) Field Regiment, RA. E. Backus, Leicester, 1948.
- Steppler, Glenn A. – Britons, to arms! – The Story of the British Volunteer Soldier and the Volunteer Tradition in Leicestershire and Rutland. Budding Books, Stroud, 1997
- www.paoyeomanry.co.uk – official website for The Leicestershire (PAO) Yeomanry and The Leicestershire & Derbyshire (PAO) Yeomanry.

=== General works ===
- Becke, Archibald F. (1935). Order of Battle of Divisions Part 1–The Regular British Divisions. London: HMSO. OCLC 4405016.
- Becke, Archibald F. (1936). Order of Battle of Divisions Part 2A. The Territorial Force Mounted Divisions and the 1st-Line Territorial Force Divisions (42–56). London: HMSO. OCLC 4405016.
- James, Brigadier E.A. (1978). British Regiments 1914–18. London: Samson Books Limited. ISBN 0-906304-03-2.
- Mileham, Patrick (1994). The Yeomanry Regiments; 200 Years of Tradition. Edinburgh: Canongate Academic. ISBN 1-898410-36-4.
- Perry, F.W. (1993). Order of Battle of Divisions Part 5B. Indian Army Divisions. Newport: Ray Westlake Military Books. ISBN 1-871167-23-X.
- Rinaldi, Richard A (2008). Order of Battle of the British Army 1914. Ravi Rikhye. ISBN 978-0-97760728-0.
