= C Battery Royal Horse Artillery =

British Army artillery battery

- Active: 1 November 1793 – present
- Country: United Kingdom
- Branch: Army
- Type: Artillery
- Part of: 3rd Regiment Royal Horse Artillery
- Anniversaries: Balaclava Day 25 October
- Equipment: M270 MLRS
- Battle honours: Ubique

C Battery Royal Horse Artillery are a Precision Strike Battery of 3rd Regiment Royal Horse Artillery currently based in Albemarle Barracks, Northumberland, England

== History ==
=== 19th century ===
During the Corunna campaign commanded by Capt. Henry Eveleigh, participated in the retreat, but embarked before the battle began.

Half of C Bty was deployed on the Jowaki expedition of 1877–78.

=== Northern Ireland ===
The Battery deployed to HMP Maze in 1985 to guard H blocks and also performed patrols across N. Ireland from Belfast to Newry.

C Battery, 3rd Regiment Royal Horse Artillery, was attached to the 1 Royal Anglian during an operational tour of Northern Ireland from May until November 1991. The Royal Anglians, were on ops in County Fermanagh, mainly operating from St. Angelo Barracks in Enniskillen. C Bty were based at a variety of PVCP's (Permanent Vehicle Check Points) including Mullen Bridge and Gortmullen and RUC stations such as Belleek. The officers and men of C Bty performed foot patrols lasting three days at a time which included both covert and overt patrol showing a visible presence to prevent attacks on soft targets.

The Battery return to Northern Ireland in October 1992 as part of a Regimental Tour of Armagh with C Battery manning the PVCP at Middletown which was also Battery HQ and Keady RUC Station. The tour concluded in April 1993.

The Regiment was again deployed to Armagh in October 1996 with C Battery being selected as the first non-Infantry Ops Company covering most of the province in support of operations. Based at Drammad Barracks in Armagh they covered from South of Derry to West of Belfast during what was a busy time for the South Armagh Sniper using a variety of armoured land rover, helicopter and foot patrols. The tour concluded in April 1997.

== See also ==
- British Army
- Royal Artillery
- Royal Horse Artillery
- List of Royal Artillery Batteries

== Bibliography ==
- Clarke, W.G. (1993). Horse Gunners: The Royal Horse Artillery, 200 Years of Panache and Professionalism. Woolwich: The Royal Artillery Institution. ISBN 09520762-0-9.
