= British First World War cavalry generals =

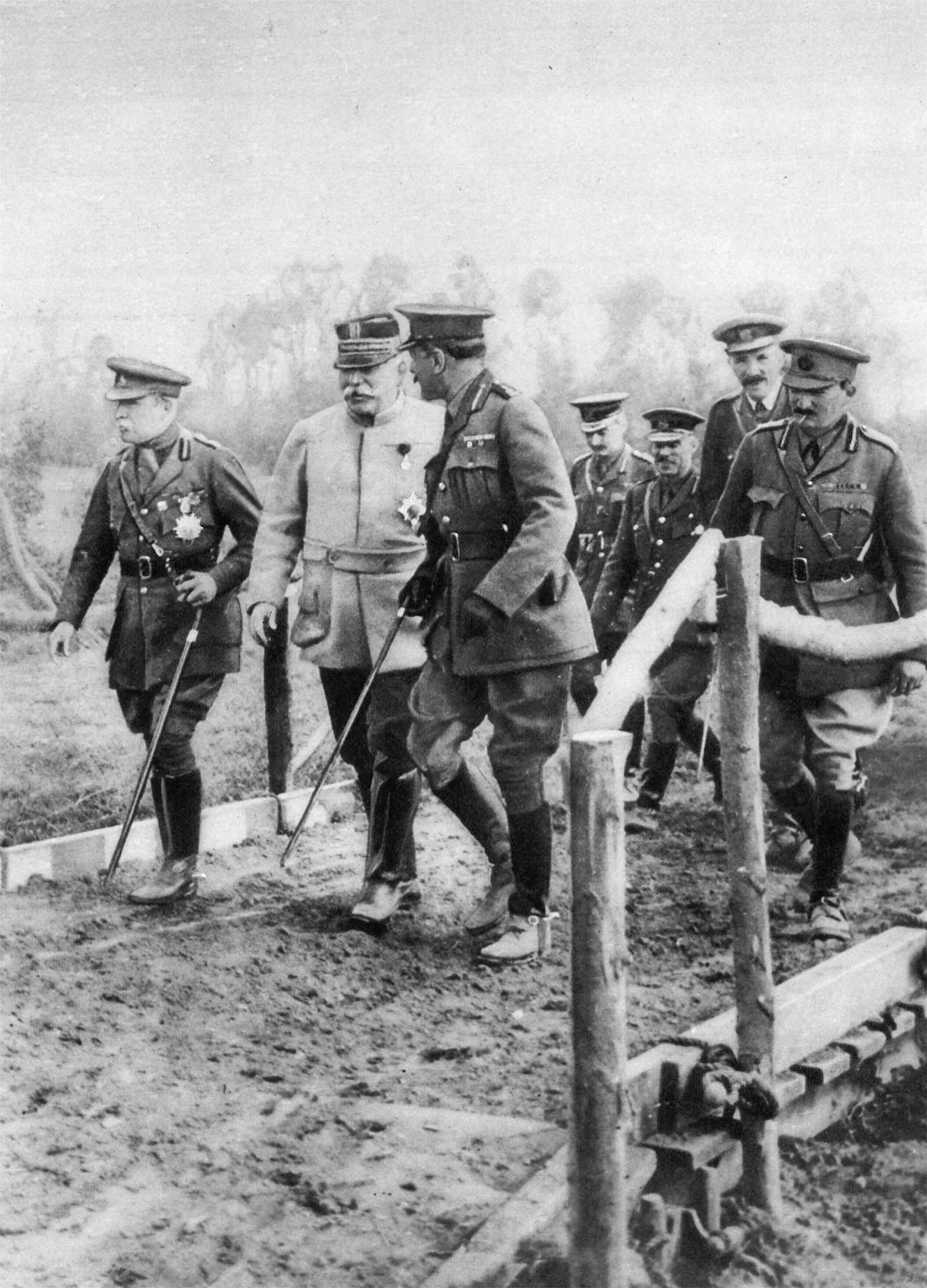
The two cavalry officers that commanded the British Expeditionary Force, Field Marshal Sir John French and General Sir Douglas Haig, flank the French General Joseph Joffre.

The British First World War cavalry generals, by the end of the war belonged to one of the smallest arms of the British Army, they did however, including those belonging to the British Indian Army, provided some of its highest ranking commanders.

The cavalry were well represented among the British Army's higher ranks, with five of the ten officers who would command the five armies on the Western Front being cavalrymen. In the British Army the term "cavalry" was only used for regular army units. The other mounted regiments in the army, which were part of the Territorial Force reserve, were the yeomanry and special reserve regiments of horse. However the yeomanry formations were commanded by cavalry or ex-cavalry officers.

The two commanders of the British Expeditionary Force during the First World War, Field Marshals John French and Douglas Haig, came from the 19th (Queen Alexandra's Own Royal) Hussars and 7th (Queen's Own) Hussars respectively. William Robertson, 3rd (Prince of Wales's) Dragoon Guards, who rose in rank from private to field marshal, was the Quartermaster General, then Chief of Staff of the British Expeditionary Force, before becoming the Chief of the Imperial General Staff in December 1915.

Edmund Allenby, 6th (Inniskilling) Dragoons, who started the war as the commander of the Cavalry Division, went on to command the Cavalry Corps, then V Corps, the Third Army, and the Egyptian Expeditionary Force. He was replaced as commander of the Third Army by Julian Byng, 10th (Prince of Wales's Own) Royal Hussars who had previously commanded the Canadian Corps. Hubert Gough of the 16th (The Queen's) Lancers, known before the war for his involvement in the Curragh incident mutiny, started the war as a brigade commander, became the commander of the I Corps, then the Fifth Army. He was replaced by William Birdwood, 12th (Prince of Wales's) Royal Lancers, who had previously commanded the Australian and New Zealand Army Corps during the Gallipoli Campaign. Charles Briggs, 1st (King's) Dragoon Guards, commanded the British Salonika Army. William Peyton, 15th (The King's) Hussars, commanded the Western Desert Force during the Senussi Campaign. He later transferred to the Western Front, where he was temporarily commander of the Fifth Army before taking over command of the X Corps.

== Cavalry generals ==
Key (Note: As a rule of thumb only, some junior ranking generals did at times command larger formations, than indicated by their rank.)
Rank	Commanded
Field-Marshal	Army group
General	Army
Lieutenant-General	Corps
Major-General	Division
Brigadier-General	Brigade

This indicates a member of the British Indian Army
This indicates a member of the Special Reserve or Territorial Force yeomanry

Name (Note: Alphabetical by surname.)	Rank (Note: This is their highest rank during the war, some advanced to higher ranks post war.)	Command (Note: This is their last command, some generals rose from brigade to army commands during the conflict.)	Regiment
Edmund Allenby	General	Egyptian Expeditionary Force	6th (Inniskilling) Dragoons
Anthony Ashley-Cooper	Brigadier-General	1st South Western Mounted Brigade	North Irish Horse
James Babington	Lieutenant-General	XIV Corps	16th (The Queen's) Lancers
George Baille-Hamilton	Brigadier-General	41st Brigade	Royal Horse Guards
Edward Baird	Brigadier-General	179th (2/4th London) Brigade	Duke of York's Own Loyal Suffolk Hussars
Guy Baldwin	Brigadier-General	Derajat Brigade	25th Cavalry (Frontier Force)
Reginald Barnes	Major-General	57th (2nd West Lancashire) Division	10th (Prince of Wales's Own) Royal Hussars
George Barrow	Major-General	4th Cavalry Division	35th Scinde Horse
Charles Bates	Brigadier-General	Director of Remounts EEF	Northumberland Hussars
Desmond Beale-Brown	Brigadier-General	2nd Cavalry Brigade	9th (Queen's Royal) Lancers
Guy Beatty	Brigadier-General	8th (Lucknow) Cavalry Brigade	9th Hodson's Horse
Lionel Beatty	Brigadier-General		31st Duke of Connaught's Own Lancers
Charles Beckett	Brigadier-General	66th (2nd East Lancashire) Division	2nd Dragoon Guards (Queen's Bays)
John Bell-Smyth	Brigadier-General	3rd Cavalry Brigade	1st (King's) Dragoon Guards
Hugh Bethell	Major-General	66th (2nd East Lancashire) Division	7th (Queen's Own) Hussars
Charles Briggs	Lieutenant-General	British Salonika Army	6th (Inniskilling) Dragoons
Cecil Bingham	Major-General	1st Cavalry Division	1st Life Guards
William Birdwood	General	Fifth Army	12th (Prince of Wales's) Royal Lancers
Robert Broadwood	Lieutenant-General	57th (2nd West Lancashire) Division	12th (Prince of Wales's) Royal Lancers
William Bromley-Davenport	Brigadier-General	22nd Mounted Brigade	Staffordshire Yeomanry
Howard Brown	Brigadier General	South Eastern Mounted Brigade	12th (Prince of Wales's) Royal Lancers
Robert Browne-Clayton	Brigadier-General	59th Brigade	South Irish Horse
George Bridges	Major-General	19th (Western) Division	4th (Queen's Own) Hussars
Charles Bulkeley-Johnson	Brigadier-General	8th Cavalry Brigade	2nd Dragoon Guards (Queen's Bays)
Alfred Burt	Brigadier-General	7th Cavalry Brigade	3rd (Prince of Wales's) Dragoon Guards
John Burn-Murdoch	Major-General	The Cyclist Division	1st (Royal) Dragoons
Julian Byng	General	Third Army	10th (Prince of Wales's Own) Royal Hussars
Robert Cassels	Brigadier-General	11th Indian Cavalry Brigade	32nd Lancers
Alexander Cambridge	Major-General	Head of mission Belgian Army	2nd Life Guards
Charles Campbell	Brigadier-General	5th Cavalry Brigade	16th (The Queen's) Lancers
David Campbell	Major-General	21st Division	4th (Royal Irish) Dragoon Guards
Frederick Cavendish	Brigadier-General	Head of mission French Army	9th (Queen's Royal) Lancers
Oswald Chance	Brigadier-General	General Staff officer War Office	5th (Royal Irish) Lancers
Philip Chetwode	Lieutenant-General	XX Corps	19th (Queen Alexandra's Own Royal) Hussars
Goland Clarke	Brigadier-General	10th Cavalry Brigade	City of London Yeomanry (Rough Riders)
Bertie Clay	Brigadier-General	34th Brigade	5th (Princess Charlotte of Wales's) Dragoon Guards
George Cookson	Major-General	2nd Indian Cavalry Division	29th Lancers (Deccan Horse)
Francis Commeline	Brigadier-General	Secunderabad Cavalry Brigade	2nd Lancers (Gardner's Horse)
Anthony Courage	Brigadier-General	2nd Tank Brigade	15th (The King's) Hussars
Sydney Crocker	Major-General	Mesopotamia Cavalry Division	9th Hodson's Horse
Frederick Davies	Brigadier-General	1st (Risalpur) Cavalry Brigade	Queen Victoria's Own Corps of Guides
Beauvoir De Lisle	Lieutenant-General	XV Corps	1st (Royal) Dragoons
FitzJames Edwards	Brigadier-General	7th (Meerut) Cavalry Brigade	33rd Queen's Own Light Cavalry
Raleigh Gilbert Egerton	Lieutenant-General	14th Indian Division	Queen Victoria's Own Corps of Guides
William Fasken	Brigadier-General	8th (Lucknow) Cavalry Brigade	10th Duke of Cambridge's Own Lancers
Hew Fanshawe	Lieutenant-General	V Corps	2nd Dragoon Guards (Queen's Bays)
Bertie Fisher	Brigadier-General	8th Brigade	17th (The Duke of Cambridge's Own) Lancers
Percy FitzGerald	Brigadier-General	5th Mounted Brigade	11th (Prince Albert's Own) Hussars
Simon Fraser	Major-General	4th Mounted Division	1st Life Guards
John French	Field-Marshal	British Expeditionary Force	19th (Queen Alexandra's Own Royal) Hussars
Frederick Fryer	Brigadier-General	22nd Mounted Brigade	6th (Inniskilling) Dragoons
Moreton Gage	Brigadier-General	8th (Lucknow) Cavalry Brigade	5th (Princess Charlotte of Wales's) Dragoon Guards
Francis Garratt	Brigadier-General	Director of Remounts BEF	6th Dragoon Guards (The Carabiniers)
Wilfrith Green	Brigadier-General	10th Cavalry Brigade	36th Jacob's Horse
Walter Greenly	Major-General	2nd Cavalry Division	19th (Queen Alexandra's Own Royal) Hussars
Charles Gregory	Brigadier-General	11th Cavalry Brigade	19th Lancers (Fane's Horse)
Charles Godwin	Brigadier-General	10th Cavalry Brigade	23rd Cavalry (Frontier Force)
Hubert Gough	General	Fifth Army	16th (The Queen's) Lancers
Douglas Haig	Field Marshal	British Expeditionary Force	17th (The Duke of Cambridge's Own) Lancers
Neil Haig	Brigadier-General	5th Cavalry Brigade	6th (Inniskilling) Dragoons
Cyril Harbord	Brigadier-General	15th (Imperial Service) Cavalry Brigade	29th Lancers (Deccan Horse)
Percival Hambro	Major-General	DA&QMG	15th (The King's) Hussars
Anthony Harman	Major-General	3rd Cavalry Division	3rd (Prince of Wales's) Dragoon Guards
John Hardress-Lloyd	Brigadier-General	3rd Tank Brigade	4th (Royal Irish) Dragoon Guards
Maxwell Henderson	Brigadier-General	Imperial Service Cavalry Brigade	26th King George's Own Light Cavalry
Edmund Herbert	Brigadier-General	Welsh Border Mounted Brigade	6th (Inniskilling) Dragoons
Reginald Hoare	Brigadier-General	229th Brigade	4th (Queen's Own) Hussars
Henry Hodgson	Major-General	Australian Mounted Division	15th (The King's) Hussars
George Holdsworth	Brigadier-General	Remount Service	7th (Queen's Own) Hussars
Pomeroy Holland-Prior	Brigadier-General	6th Indian Cavalry Brigade	1st Duke of York’s Own Lancers (Skinner’s Horse)
Herbert Holman	Major-General	DA&QMG Fourth Army	16th Cavalry
Archibald Home	Brigadier-General	Brigadier-General General Staff	11th (Prince Albert's Own) Hussars
William Horwood	Brigadier-General	Provost Marshal BEF	5th (Royal Irish) Lancers
Philip Howell	Brigadier General	General Staff II Corps	4th (Queen's Own) Hussars
Richard Howard-Vyse	Brigadier-General	10th Cavalry Brigade	Royal Horse Guards
Havelock Hudson	Major-General	8th Division	19th Lancers (Fane's Horse)
Robert Hutchison	Major-General	Director of Organisation War Office	4th (Royal Irish) Dragoon Guards
William James	Major-General	Administrative Staff	21st Prince Albert Victor's Own Cavalry
James Jardine	Brigadier-General	97th Brigade	5th (Royal Irish) Lancers
Leslie Jones	Major-General	Mesopotamia Cavalry Division	5th Cavalry
Charles Kavanagh	Lieutenant-General	Cavalry Corps	10th (Prince of Wales's Own) Royal Hussars
Philip Kelly	Brigadier-General	13th Cavalry Brigade	3rd (The King's Own) Hussars
Paul Kenna	Brigadier-General	3rd (Nottinghamshire and Derbyshire) Mounted Brigade	21st (Empress of India's) Lancers
Alfred Kennedy	Major-General	4th Cavalry Division	3rd (The King's Own) Hussars
Stuart Kirby	Brigadier-General	9th Cavalry Brigade	6th Dragoon Guards (The Carabiniers)
Wyndham Knight	Major-General	Commandant Embarkation India	4th Cavalry
Frederick Lance	Brigadier-General	7th Mounted Brigade	19th Lancers (Fane's Horse)
Herbert Lawrence	Lieutenant-General	Chief of the General Staff BEF	King Edward's Horse
Algernon Lawson	Brigadier-General	2nd Cavalry Brigade	2nd Dragoon Guards (Queen's Bays)
Henry Leader	Lieutenant-General	1st Indian Cavalry Division	6th Dragoon Guards (The Carabiniers)
D'Arcy Legard	Brigadier-General	9th Cavalry Brigade	17th (The Duke of Cambridge's Own) Lancers
Malcolm Orme Little	Brigadier-General	2/1st Welsh Border Mounted Brigade	9th (Queen's Royal) Lancers
Arthur Lloyd	Brigadier-General	Commander Canal Zone	Shropshire Yeomanry
Walter Long	Brigadier-General	56th Brigade	2nd Dragoons (Royal Scots Greys)
William Lowe	Brigadier-General	3rd Reserve Cavalry Brigade	7th (The Princess Royal's) Dragoon Guards
Osbert Lumley	Brigadier-General	Inspector of Cavalry	11th (Prince Albert's Own) Hussars
Henry Macandrew	Major-General	5th Cavalry Division	5th Cavalry
Bryan Mahon	Lieutenant-General	Commander-in-Chief, Ireland	8th (The King's Royal Irish) Hussars
Angus McNeill	Brigadier-General	230th Brigade	2nd Lovat Scouts
Ernest Makins	Brigadier-General	6th Cavalry Brigade	1st (Royal) Dragoons
Laurence Maxwell	Brigadier-General	2nd (Sialkot) Cavalry Brigade	2nd Lancers (Gardner's Horse)
Andrew Mcculloch	Brigadier-General	64th Brigade	14th (King's) Hussars
Alfred Miller	Brigadier-General	DA&QMG	2nd Dragoons (Royal Scots Greys)
George Milner	Brigadier-General	Lowland Mounted Brigade	5th (Royal Irish) Lancers
Noel Money	Brigadier-General	159th (Cheshire) Brigade	Shropshire Yeomanry
Colquhoun Morrison	Brigadier-General	General Staff	1st (Royal) Dragoons
Richard Mullens	Major-General	1st Cavalry Division	4th (Royal Irish) Dragoon Guards
John Nicholson	Brigadier-General	Le Havre Base	7th (Queen's Own) Hussars
Norman Nickalls	Brigadier-General	63rd Brigade	17th (The Duke of Cambridge's Own) Lancers
Charles Norton	Brigadier-General	7th (Meerut) Cavalry Brigade	7th (Queen's Own) Hussars
Edmund O'Brien	Brigadier-General	2/1st Western Mounted Brigade	14th (King's) Hussars
Reginald O'Bryan Taylor	Brigadier-General	187th (2/3rd West Riding) Brigade	19th Lancers (Fane's Horse)
Thomas Packenham	Brigadier-General	2nd (2nd South Midland) Mounted Brigade	2nd Life Guards
Arthur Parker	Brigadier-General	5th Tank Brigade	5th (Royal Irish) Lancers
Ewing Paterson	Brigadier-General	6th Cavalry Brigade	6th (Inniskilling) Dragoons
Arthur Peck	Major-General	DA&QMG	25th Cavalry (Frontier Force)
William Peyton	Lieutenant-General	Fifth Army	15th (The King's) Hussars
Arthur Phayre	Lieutenant-General	9th (Secunderabad) Division	3rd Skinner's Horse
Ivor Philipps	Major-General	38th (Welsh) Division	Pembrokeshire Yeomanry
Charles Pirie	Major-General	3rd (Ambala) Cavalry Brigade	15th Lancers (Cureton's Multanis)
Duncan Pitcher	Brigadier-General	1st Brigade Royal Flying Corps	39th King George's Own Central India Horse
Thomas Pitman	Major-General	2nd Cavalry Division	11th (Prince Albert's Own) Hussars
Thomas Pitt	Brigadier-General	6th Mounted Brigade	2nd County of London Yeomanry
Robert Poore	Brigadier-General	Jhansi Brigade	7th (Queen's Own) Hussars
Bertram Portal	Brigadier-General	7th Cavalry Brigade	17th (The Duke of Cambridge's Own) Lancers
Charles Rankin	Brigadier-General	3rd (Ambala) Cavalry Brigade	4th (Queen's Own) Hussars
Michael Rimington	Lieutenant-General	Indian Cavalry Corps	6th (Inniskilling) Dragoons
Hereward Roberts	Brigadier-General	4th (Meerut) Cavalry Brigade	1st Duke of York's Own Lancers (Skinner's Horse)
William Robertson	General	Chief Imperial General Staff	3rd (Prince of Wales's) Dragoon Guards
Claude Rome	Brigadier-General	8th Mounted Brigade	11th (Prince Albert's Own) Hussars
William Rycroft	Major-General	32nd Division	11th (Prince Albert's Own) Hussars
Lionel Sadleir-Jackson	Brigadier-General	54th Brigade	9th (Queen's Royal) Lancers
John Seely	Brigadier-General	Canadian Cavalry Brigade	Hampshire Yeomanry (Carabiniers)
Horace Sewell	Brigadier-General	1st Cavalry Brigade	7th (Queen's Own) Hussars
Archibald Seymour	Brigadier-General	8th Cavalry Brigade	2nd Dragoon Guards (Queen's Bays)
John Shea	Major-General	60th (2/2nd London) Division	35th Scinde Horse
Walter Smithson	Brigadier-General	2/1st Yorkshire Mounted Brigade	13th Hussars
Oswald Smith-Bingham	Brigadier-General	Inspector General of Cavalry	3rd (Prince of Wales's) Dragoon Guards
Nevill Smyth	Major-General	59th (2nd North Midland) Division	6th Dragoon Guards (The Carabiniers)
Robert Smyth	Brigadier-General	7th Cyclist Brigade	21st (Empress of India's) Lancers
Arthur Solly-Flood	Major-General	42nd (East Lancashire) Division	4th (Royal Irish) Dragoon Guards
Edward Spears (Note: Changed name from Edward Louis Spiers by deed poll in 1918.)	Brigadier-General	Liaison officer French GHQ	8th (The King's Royal Irish) Hussars
John Stewart-Murray	Brigadier-General	Scottish Horse Mounted Brigade	Royal Horse Guards
Archibald Stirling	Brigadier-General	Highland Mounted Brigade	2nd Lovat Scouts
Frederick Sykes	Major-General	Chief of the Air Staff	15th (The King's) Hussars
Harold Tagart	Major-General	DA&QMG	15th (The King's) Hussars
Arthur Taylor	Brigadier-General	8th Mounted Brigade	13th Hussars
Charles Thompson	Major-General	GOC Sierra Leone	7th (The Princess Royal's) Dragoon Guards
James Turner	Major-General	1st (Risalpur) Cavalry Brigade	4th Cavalry
Julian Tynedale-Biscoe	Brigadier-General	Yeomanry Mounted Brigade	11th (Prince Albert's Own) Hussars
John Vaughan	Major-General	3rd Cavalry Division	10th (Prince of Wales's Own) Royal Hussars
Berkeley Vincent	Brigadier-General	35th Brigade	6th (Inniskilling) Dragoons
Richard Wapshare	Major-General	4th (Quetta) Division	1st Duke of York's Own Lancers (Skinner's Horse)
Frederick Wadeson	Brigadier-General	9th (Secunderabad) Cavalry Brigade	37th Lancers (Baluch Horse)
Thomas Ward	Brigadier-General		Denbighshire Hussars
William Watson	Major-General	Imperial Service Cavalry Brigade	39th King George's Own Central India Horse
George Weir	Brigadier-General	84th Brigade	3rd (Prince of Wales's) Dragoon Guards
Adrian de Wiart	Brigadier-General	134th (2/1st Hampshire) Brigade	4th (Royal Irish) Dragoon Guards
John Wigan	Brigadier-General	7th Mounted Brigade	Berkshire Yeomanry
Edgar Wiggin	Brigadier-General	1st (1st South Midland) Mounted Brigade	13th Hussars
Thomas Wight-Boycott	Brigadier-General	2nd South Midland Mounted Brigade	Warwickshire Yeomanry
Coventry Williams	Brigadier-General	22nd Mounted Brigade	13th Hussars
Frank Wormald	Brigadier-General	5th Cavalry Brigade	12th (Prince of Wales's Royal) Lancers
Ralph Yorke	Brigadier-General	Western Desert Force	Royal Gloucestershire Hussars
George Younghusband	Major-General	7th (Meerut) Division	Queen Victoria's Own Corps of Guides

== See also ==
- British Army during the First World War
