= 14th Horse (Scinde Horse) =

Indian Army unit

Scinde Horse
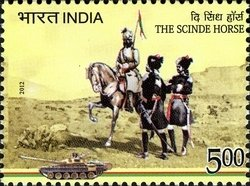
- Active: 1839 - present
- Country: India
- Allegiance: East India Company (till 1858); British Raj (1858–1947); India (1947 onwards)
- Branch: Bombay Army; British Indian Army; Indian Army
- Type: Cavalry
- Size: Regiment
- Part of: Indian Armoured Corps
- Motto: Man Dies But The Regiment Lives
- Colors: Light Green, Scarlet and Emerald Green
- Engagements: Second Sikh War; Second Afghan War; World War I World War II; Indo-Pakistani War of 1965; Indo-Pakistani War of 1971

Commanders
- Colonel of the Regiment: Lieutenant General Devendra Sharma

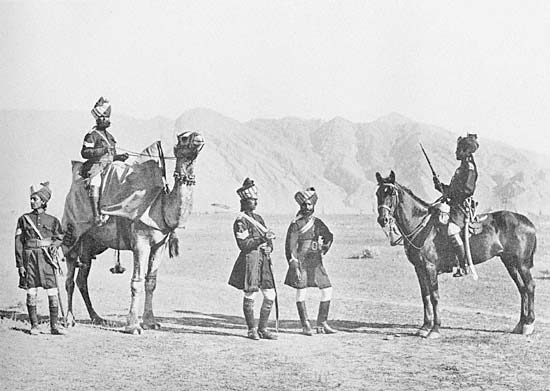
5th Bombay Cavalry (Scinde Horse). ~1895

The Scinde Horse is an armoured regiment in the Armoured Corps of the Indian Army. The regiment, known before independence as the 14th Prince of Wales's Own Scinde Horse was a regular cavalry regiment of the Bombay Army, and later the British Indian Army.

Scinde Horse is the only regiment known to honour its enemy till date (the Baluchi warrior on its badge) and has not changed its badge since its raising. At one point, the regiment carried nine Standards while on parade (regiments normally hold one), a unique privilege given to it for its valour. The regiment was the first cavalry unit of the British Indian Army to be mechanized (at Rawalpindi, in 1938). It was also the first cavalry regiment to get the President of India's Standard after independence.

== Formation ==
The regiment can trace its formation back to The Scinde Irregular Horse raised at Hyderabad, Sindh on 8 August 1839. The regiment was raised at the recommendation of Colonel Henry Pottinger, the Resident at Scinde. The first commandant was Captain W. Ward of the 15th Regiment of the Bombay Native Infantry. It was named after the province of Sind, where it was raised to protect the trade route from the Bolan Pass to Sukkur on the Indus River and fight against the marauding Baluchi warriors.

The nucleus was from the squadron of the Poona Auxiliary Horse serving in Cutch.

In 1846, the 2nd Scinde Horse was formed by splitting the regiment into two and completing the establishment by new recruits. In 1857, the 3rd Scinde Horse regiment was raised. This regiment saw action during the Indian Rebellion of 1857, during the British expedition to Abyssinia 1867, in the Second Anglo-Afghan War (1878) and in the Battle of Maiwand in 1880. The 3rd Scinde Horse was disbanded in 1882 upon general reductions in the cavalry.

These regiments were absorbed into the regular forces after the Indian Rebellion of 1857 and became the 5th and 6th Bombay Cavalry. They reverted to their old names three years later and in 1903 changes made them the 35th Scinde Horse and the 36th Jacob's Horse.

They saw active service in Northern and Central India, Persia, Afghanistan on the North West Frontier and, during World War I, where they served in France and Palestine. Both units underwent changes in their names over time –

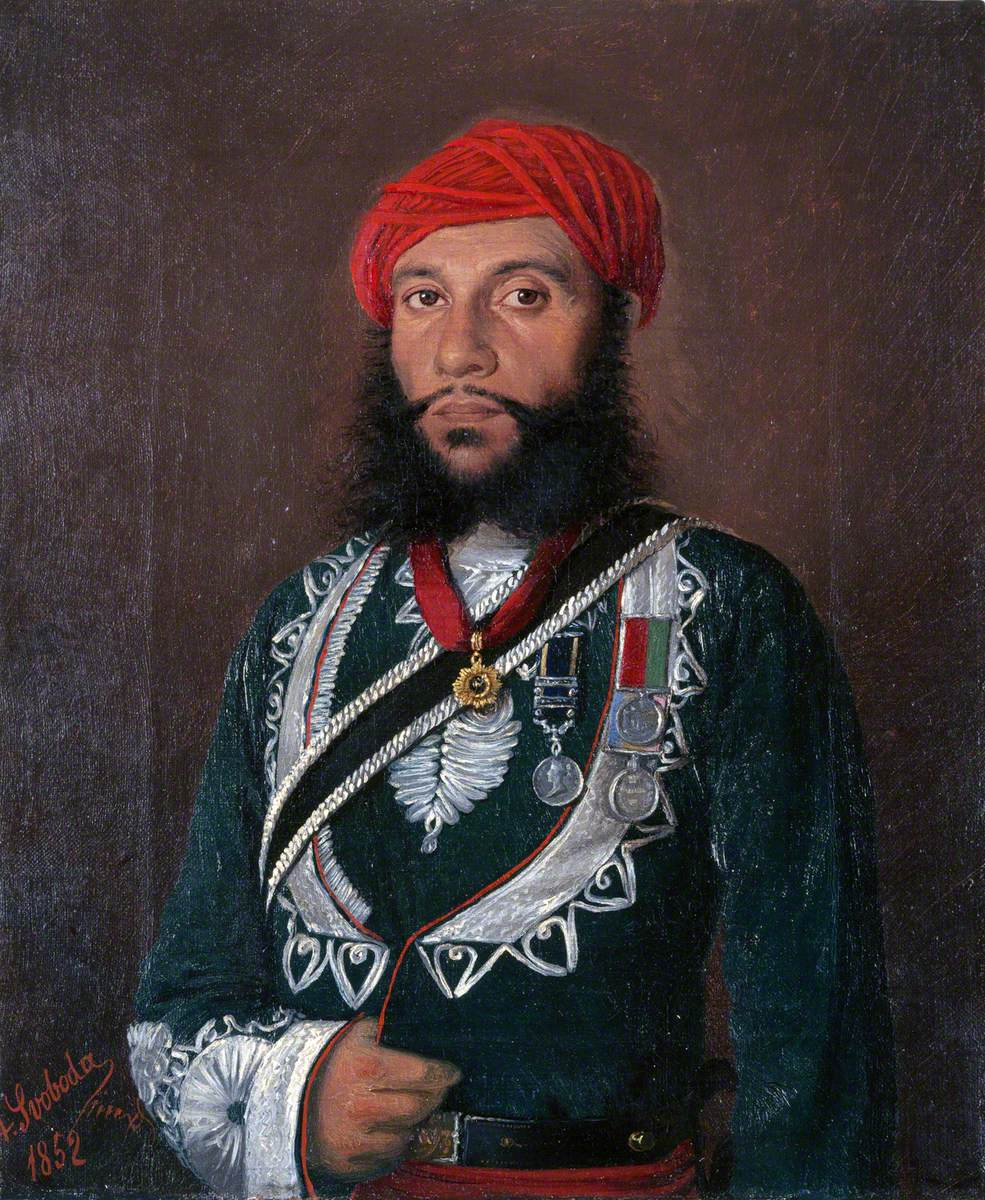
Painting of ‘Rissaldar Mohubut Khan, Bahadur, 2nd Scinde Irregular Horse’ by Sandor Alexander Svoboda

35th Scinde Horse

- 1839 : Raised in Hyderabad by Captain W. Ward as Scinde Irregular Horse
- 1846 : Became the 1st Regiment, Scinde Irregular Horse
- 1860 : 1st Regiment, Scinde Horse
- 1861 : 8th Regiment, Scinde Silladar Cavalry
- 1885 : 5th Bombay Cavalry (Jacob ka Risallah)
- 1888 : 5th Bombay Cavalry (Scinde Horse)
- 1903 : 35th Scinde Horse

36th Jacob's Horse

- 1846 : Raised in Hyderabad by Captain John Jacob as 2nd Regiment, Scinde Irregular Horse
- 1860 : 2nd Regiment, Scinde Horse
- 1861 : 9th Regiment, Scinde Silladar Cavalry
- 1885 : 6th Bombay Cavalry (Jacob ka Risallah)
- 1888 : 6th Bombay Cavalry (Scinde Horse)
- 1903 : 36th Jacob's Horse

The two regiments were amalgamated in 1921 and in 1922 named the 14th Prince of Wales's Own Scinde Horse, which served in World War II. Following the independence of India, the regiment was allotted to India and renamed the 14 Horse (Scinde Horse).

== History ==
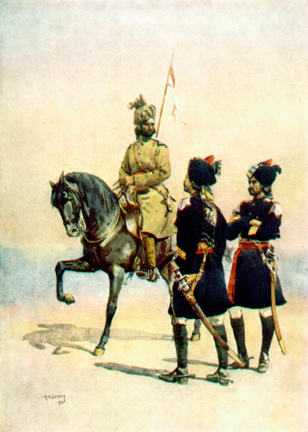
Baluch soldier of the 37th Lancers (Baluch Horse), Pathan soldier of the 36th Jacob's Horse and Baluch Kot Daffadar of the 35th Scinde Horse, water colour on paper illustration for 'Armies of India' by Major G.F. MacMunn, published in 1911

The Scinde Horse was raised to protect the British Caravans traversing the Spice Route - from the Bolan Pass in Afghanistan, to the Indus at Sukkur and then via Fort Abbas to Bikaner, Hissar and Delhi. The route through the Thar Desert via Jaisalmer was too difficult and dangerous. Since this involved corridor protection along the route, laying in ambush and also accompanying the caravans, they travelled mostly in civilian dress with weapons hidden to look inconspicuous. As a result, they were popularly called "The Scinde Irregular Horse". The term Irregulars is carried with pride amongst Scinde horsemen to this day as they have consistently surprised the adversary both in times of war and in competitions during peace to gain an upper hand. The Irregulars have always thought "out of the box" and accomplished the seemingly impossible.

The Badge

The adversary during the early days, were the Baloochi marauders of the hill tribe of Jekhranis. On numerous occasions, the Irregulars raided their camps to recover the booty they had looted from the caravans. However, the Irregulars respected the Jekhranis for their skill and valour in combat, so they adopted a Badge, depicting a Baloochi warrior with his spear (Jezail) charging on a Stallion, to remind them of a brave and valiant enemy, who they repeatedly vanquished. The Scinde Horse, apart from its unique Badge, also is perhaps the only Regiment to have retained the same badge since inception. It adopted its Garrison Town, Khangur, West of Sukkur on the Indus, which came to be called as Jacobabad, after its first Commandant. This name still remains and Jacobabad is now a major Garrison Town and Airbase in Pakistan.

John Jacob

Having been raised as a contingent from detachments of the Poona Horse and others under Captain William Ward, the Scinde Irregular Horse got its first Commandant, John Jacob, an engineer from the Bombay Artillery. John Jacob commanded and then remained a mentor of the Regiment from 1839 to 1856, in the process, achieving the Rank of Brigadier General, attained Knighthood and Governorship of the province of Scinde. Brigadier General Sir John Jacob was buried at Jacobabad, named after him. Being an engineer, during his illustrious career, he led the Regiment in the Famous Charge at Meeanee, invented a rifled gun which fired both shot and shell accurately up to 1200 yards and used a straight cavalry Sabre as a bayonet. This invention finds a place in the ‘Handbook of Ancient Firearms’. His Saddlery and Gun along with the Sabre are placed in the Officers' Mess in the Regiment. He also gave great thought to the location of his Grave and selected a spot in the flood plains of the Indus, wherein the flood waters would rise to the level of the foot of his grave and then recede due to overflow into the next area. This unique phenomenon resulted in the locals believing him to be a saint (Peer) and his grave is worshipped to this day. In fact, in 1997, the Pakistani Government spent a few lakhs of rupees to renovate the Grave and invited John Jacob's decedents at the re-inauguration. After that, they visited India as honoured guests of the Regiment.

The Regiment

John Jacob was also a very able administrator and that is why the Scinde Horse was so successful in its task and kept the region under control. There was a special bond between the Regiment and the "Bootgee" Tribe, which was formed out of mutual respect amongst the fiercest warriors in the entire Scinde and Balochistan Provinces. While keeping the caravans safe from marauders, the Regiment ensured a fair contribution to the tribals of the lands through which the caravans passed. In those days, recruitment and salaries were uniquely determined. The remuneration was as per service and rank. It was paid out of the earnings or bounty earned by the Regiment. Since the Scinde Horse was mostly on operational tasks and effected numerous recoveries, it earned a large amount of bounty and paid its officers and men handsomely. As a result, recruitment into the regiment also had a high price, which was a record in its own right – a soldier had to bring his own horse, Groom and also pay an enrolment fee as high as 800 rupees. Despite this, there was a rush to join the Regiment and soon the Regiment expanded to the 1st, 2nd and 3rd Scinde Horse. The Badge remained the same while the shoulder titles were distinctive.

The Prince of Wales' Own

The Horsed Cavalry Regiments were named according to their operational role and weapons they carried. The Cavalry Regiments carried Sabres and were further divided into Light Cavalry and Cavalry. They were employed to outflank the enemy in the battlefield and charge through his ranks to cause destruction. Whereas the Cavalry carried a Sabre and Broadsword, the Light cavalry carried only sabres and relied on swiftness and surprise to vanquish the enemy. The Lancers Regiments, apart from Sabres, carried Lances to destroy enemy infantry hiding in trenches as well as using spears to protect themselves from the mounted troops. The Horse on the other hand, was a very versatile and heavily weaponised Regiment. It carried a Sabre, Broadsword and also a Rifle. It was capable of fighting both mounted and dismounted. The horses were huge, rising to 17 Hands and carried additional provisions and ammunition, giving the "Horse" Regiment a capability to undertake long marches and engage the enemy at a standoff or hold blocking positions to give the main force to organise itself. The only time The Scinde Horse carried Lances, was in a ceremonial role when it was chosen to escort His Royal Highness, The Prince of Wales, on his visit to Delhi for the Royal Durbar in 1921. The Pennants on the Lances were Primrose and Blue. His Royal Highness, consented to become the Honorary Colonel of the Regiment and thence forth, the Regiment was Known as "The Prince of Wales' Own (PWO) Cavalry, The Scinde Horse".

The Regimental Colours and Motto.

The Regimental Battle Flashes and colours of the flag are also significant in their meaning. The Light Green, Scarlet Red and Emerald Green signify From Green Fields, Through Blood, To the Meadows (Glory or Death) Beyond. The motto of the Regiment is therefore also significant and is: Man Dies but the Regiment Lives, In Hindi, it goes: Insaan Toh Mar Jaata Hai, Magar Regiment Hamesha Zinda Rehti Hai, thus putting the interest of the Regiment above all.

The Regimental War Cry: The Scinde Horse Spirit is epitomised in its unique War Cry which spurs the Scinde Horse soldiers to decimate the enemy – Jai Mata Ki! Jai Chhatrapati Ki! Har Har Mahadev! Bole So Nihal – Sat Sri Akal! Hat Ja ___ Here I Come!!!

The Regimental religious chant (Jayakar) is Bole So Nihal – Sat Sri Akal! Bole So Abhay – Bol Sri Krishan Baldev Ki Jai! Jayakar Bajrang Bali – Har Har Mahadev! Wahe Guruji Ka Khalsa – Wahe GuruJi Ki Fateh!

Battle of Meeanee

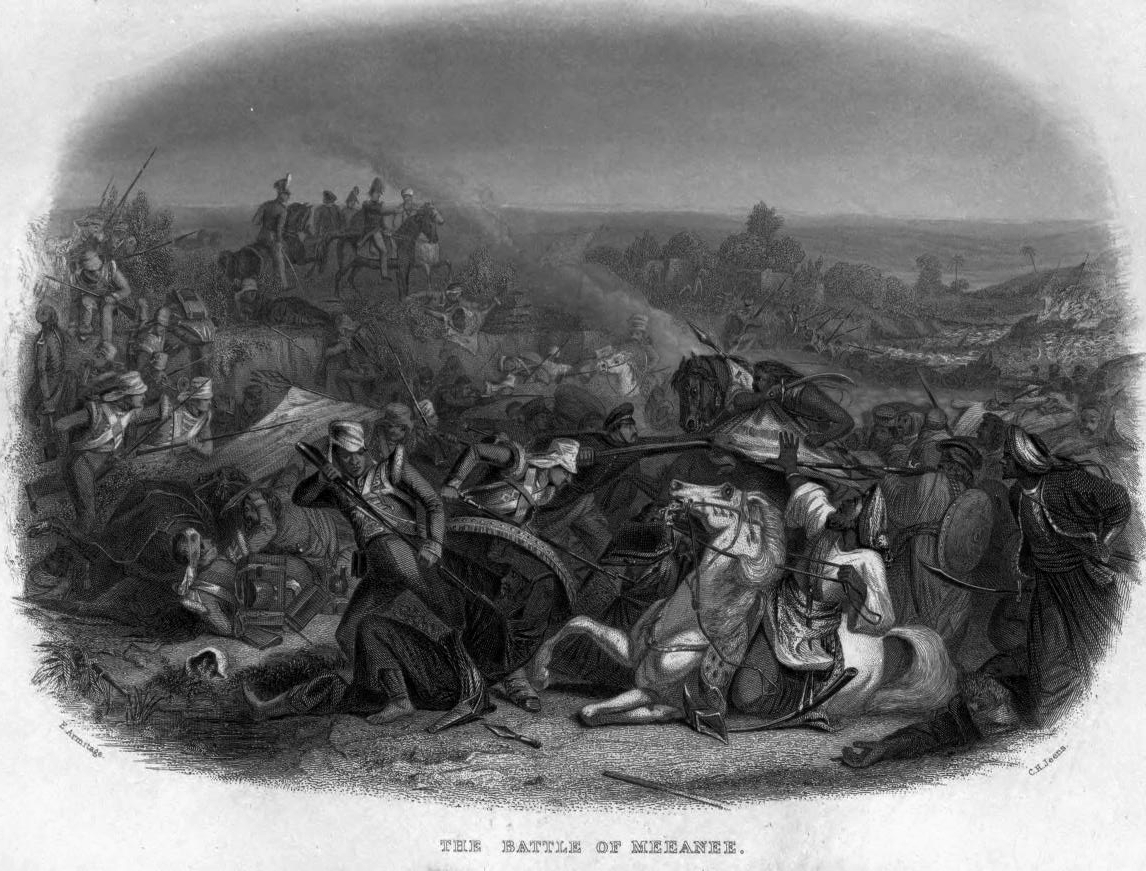
The Battle of Meeanee in The Illustrated History of the British Empire in India and the East - Volume 2

On the 17th of February 1843, as part of Sir Charles Napier's advance guard of his expeditionary force to conquer the province of Scinde, the Scinde Horse came across the forward elements of the combined forces of the Waziri tribals of Sind, led by Mir Nuseer Khan, entrenched in the Fulaillee Nala, near Meeanee, 23 miles ahead of Hyderabad, the capital town of Sind. Along with the Scinde Horse, there were amongst others, 5 Raj Rif (Napiers Rifles), the Cheshire Regiment and the Poona Horse, bringing up the rear, with the Madras Engineers providing engineering support. Not to be deterred, the regiment reconnoitred the area and made an outflanking move through dense forest and broken country, most unsuitable for horses. In an unparalleled outflanking manoeuvre in which over 70 horses died of fatigue, the Scinde Horse surprised the enemy by appearing at their rear and routed them in a cavalry charge, capturing the principal standard of Mir Nuseer Khan in the process. Seeing their Standard captured, the enemy capitulated and Sind was conquered. Sir Charles Napier cryptically signalled back "Pecavi" (I have Sinned (Sind)).

As a reward for this cavalry charge, unsurpassed in the annals of warfare, the regiment was presented eight cavalry standards (one per troop) and also allowed to retain Mir Nuseer Khan's principal standard, with the ‘Hand of Allah’ atop it, as its main Standard. This hand of Allah has played a major role in looking after the Regiment in times of need, ever since. The Scinde Horse has had the unique privilege of carrying Nine Standards on parade. Unlike the charge of the 600 who rode to their death in Crimea, showing foolhardy bravado, the 640 (8 Troops) Scinde horsemen showed both unsurpassed courage and tactical acumen in routing the enemy and winning an entire campaign. Unfortunately, there was no Tennyson to write a ballad for this successful charge, instead of the one he wrote for the fatal Charge of the Light Brigade.

The charge at Khushk-e-Nakhud

The Scinde Horse was tasked as the rear guard for the forces returning from the First Afghan Campaign. On 26 Feb 1878, it was at Khushk-e-Nakhud near the Afghan border that the regiment had taken an administrative halt and was carrying out saddlery inspection, that the early warning elements reported a large body of Afghan tribesmen approaching the camp. The men hastily gathered their weapons and mounted their horses, without saddles to engage the approaching enemy. The regiment, led by Maj Reynolds, charged the enemy before it could form up near the camp and routed them, killing many times their own numbers. Unfortunately, Maj Reynolds was martyred in this charge. Maj Douglas Giles, who was there, reduced an eyewitness account in a famous painting, 10' x 6', completing it in 1883. This painting was popularly displayed in the Louvre in Paris, from 1913 to 1921, till it found its final place in the Officers' Mess. It is unique in that it has every eye-catching detail. The colours used are from natural pigments and regain their brightness when exposed to the sun. In the Officers' Mess Ante Room, this painting is faced by a lone Horseman's Silver Trophy, representing Maj Reynolds. Ever after this Battle, The Scinde horseman never removes his sword from his person. "Taiyar-bar-Taiyar" they call it. That is why, in the Officer's Mess, now-a-days, where normally, the Belt is removed on entry, symbolising removal of the Sword, Scinde horsemen continue to wear their belt at all times.

== 35th Scinde Horse ==
The 35th Scinde Horse saw service in the Second Sikh War where it was involved in the Battle of Gujrat and the Second Afghan War. During World War I, the regiment remained in India, engaging in training and internal security duties as well as being in the Frontier operations between 1914 and 1916. The regiment was sent to Mesopotamia on 17 March 1920 as part of Sir Aylmer Haldane’s force. In their eighteen months stay, they were engaged in putting down the Arab rising and charging on the insurgents before Kufah.

== 36th Jacob's Horse ==
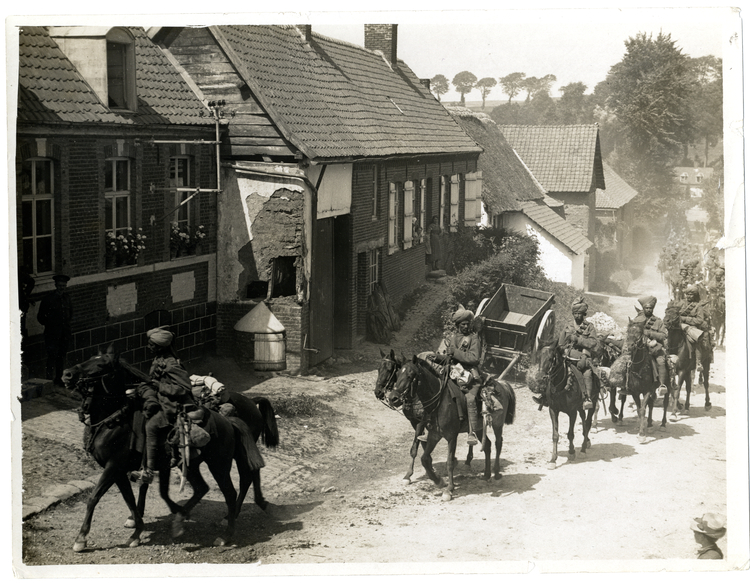
Indian cavalry troop of 36th Jacob's Horse marching through a French village near Fenges, August 1915

The regiment served first in Southern Afghanistan and later under Sir Charles Napier in the taking of Scinde. They later were involved in the Second Sikh War and the Second Afghan War. During World War I, the 36th Jacobs Horse was a part of the 8th (Lucknow) Cavalry Brigade, 1st Indian Cavalry Division which saw action in France on the Western Front. They took part in the Second Battle of Ypres, Somme and Cambrai. They later moved to Egypt for the Palestine Campaign under the 4th Cavalry Division The brigade formation was: 1st (King's) Dragoon Guards, 29th Lancers (Deccan Horse), 36th Jacob's Horse and Signal Troop. It fought in Allenby's great final cavalry operations (the actions at Sharon, Megiddo, Abu Naj, and the advance to Damascus). The regiment were garrisoned in Syria and Palestine and returned to India in 1921.

Charge of "A" Squadron at Battle of Ephey(?), France & Flanders 1917

The Fortress of Ephey, on the Franco-Prussian Border, had withstood a long siege by the allies, as it was well stocked and had natural water springs. "A" Squadron was called in to assist the allies to break the siege and word was spread that wild men from India had been brought, who eat wood and they'd take the walls apart stone by stone. The fortress commander sent out spies early morning to see these wild men for themselves and found our ferocious Sikhs with their hair and beards open, brushing their teeth with Neem ka Datun and washing their faces. Such was the fear generated, that when "A" Squadron approached the fort on their horses, they found it abandoned. "A" Squadron then charged and routed the fleeing enemy with great success.

Battle Honours of 35th Scinde Horse and 36th Jacob's Horse (1839–1921)

Pre-World War I

Meanee, Hyderabad, Cutchee, Mooltan, Goojerat, Punjaub, Persia, Central India, Afghanistan, 1878-80

World War I and later

Somme, 1916, Morval, Cambrai, 1917, France and Flanders, 1914-18, Meggido, Sharon, Damascus, Palestine, 1918, North West Frontier, India, 1914–15, ‘16.

Mechanisation

The Scinde Horse was the first Indian Cavalry Regiment to get mechanised and paraded their horses for the last time at Rawalpindi on 14 April 1938, led by their Commandant, Colonel Malcomson. For many years, till the turn of the century, this day, 14 April was celebrated as Armoured Corps Day, till for some inexplicable reason, 1 May came to be celebrated instead.

Baba Karam Singh.

"B" Squadron, Sikhs, from Guides Cavalry, which was exchanged with the Pathan Squadron at partition, brought with it, an invaluable and unique legacy. Baba Karam Singh, "Hoti Mardan Wale", was enrolled as a Sowar in B Squadron and served there till he got a calling to preach. The British officers tried to dissuade him from this and on the day, he was scheduled to preach on the banks of the Beas River, put him on duty in the Quarter Guard. The duty officer was sent to the river bank to see if Sowar Karam Singh was there. On finding him preaching there, the officer galloped back to the Quarter Guard to note Karam Singh absent but miraculously found Karam Singh on duty in the Quarter Guard. Soon Baba Karam Singh felt that it would be difficult to keep serving in the Army and requested his Squadron Commander for a discharge. On being told that he could not be given a premature discharge, Baba Karam Singh asked as to how a person be forcibly kept in the Army when he was not even listed on its rolls. On repeated scrutiny of the rolls of the Squadron, Baba Karam Singh's name was missing, so Baba Karam Singh devoted his entire time to the Guru and opened his Dera, which shifted at the time of Partition and is now near Kapurthala. With this double boon of the Hand of Allah from Mir Nuseer Khan's captured Standard and the Blessings of Baba Karam Singh, the Regiment is twice blessed in all its endeavours and prides its place amongst the finest Units in the Army.

== World War II ==
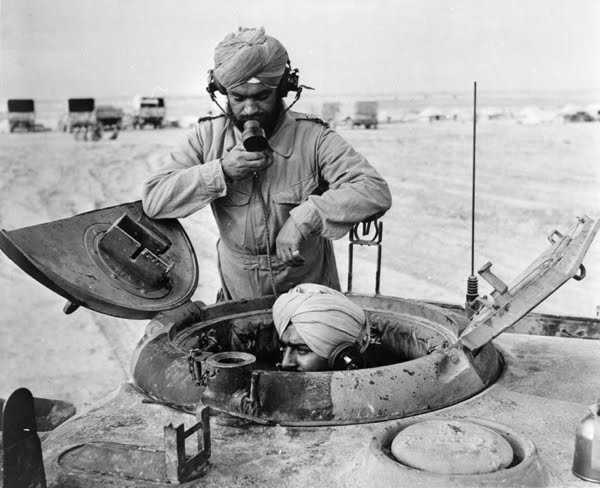
Two crew members of a Sherman tank of the Scinde Horse, part of the Indian 31st Armoured Division in Iraq, March 1944

In World War II, the 14th Prince of Wales's Own Scinde Horse was attached to the newly formed 31st Indian Armoured Division, that had been raised in July 1940. The division trained extensively, but with very few tanks — the tank Regiments assigned to 1st Indian Armoured Brigade had three M3 Stuart tanks each, though a number of the obsolete India Pattern light tanks were used for crew training. The final formation of the Division was the 252nd Indian Armoured Brigade and the 3rd Indian Motor Brigade.

Though lacking tanks, the 252nd Armoured Brigade was detached and sent to Iraq in January 1942. Division headquarters moved to Iraq in June 1942, where it took command of the shattered remnants of 3rd Indian Motor Brigade which had been detached and overrun by the Italians at the Battle of Gazala and the 252nd Indian Armoured Brigade, which still had no tanks.

Armour finally arrived in November, when one Regiment received M3 Stuart tanks and the other two received Grant medium tanks.

The Armoured Brigade formation was,

14th Prince of Wales's Own Scinde Horse, Grant Tanks
4th Duke of Cambridge's Own Hodson's Horse, Stuart Tanks
14th/20th King's Hussars, Grants Tanks

31st Armoured Division never saw action as a unit, its closest brush with combat coming in April 1944 when it was rushed to Egypt to crush a mutiny among the Greek 1st Infantry Brigade. The Brigade received M4 Sherman tanks in November 1943, apparently in preparation for transfer to combat in Italy, but only drove them in Iraq, Syria and Egypt.

== Post Independence ==
During partition the composition of the regiment with two Mohamedan Squadrons was seen as likely to be allotted to Pakistan. The Sikhs were worried about the transition but stoic. It came as a surprise that the regiment would be retained by India. In August 1947 the Pathan Squadron was transferred to Guides Cavalry and their Sikh Squadron replaced it in Scinde Horse. The Ranghar squadron in early October 1947 was transferred to the 13th Lancers. The new “C” Squadron was to be a Sikh Squadron from Probyn's Horse, but did not join the regiment as Army Headquarters had decreed that this Squadron was to join Hodson's Horse instead. Instead, the Guide's Dogra Squadron which had already joined Hodson's Horse was sent to Scinde Horse. By 22 January 1948, the Scinde Horse was composed of two Sikh and one Dogra Squadrons. The last British Commandant of the regiment was Lieutenant Colonel KR Brooke and the first Indian Commandant was Lieutenant Colonel PL Chopra.

Being the unique regiment to parade 9 Standards, it was decided to replace them by presenting the President's Standard to the regiment after Independence. The Day was fixed as ‘Meeanee Day’, 17 February 1949, at Meerut. However, due to an oversight at Army Headquarters, the Standard to be Presented had the British Crown instead of the Ashoka Lion. So, the mounted parade was allowed to proceed without presentation of the Standard and was reviewed by the then Commander-in-Chief, General KM Cariappa, who promised that The Scinde Horse would be the first regiment of the army to be presented the standard. However, even though this promise was broken by a subsequent Chief, General KS Thimmaya, who presented the standard to his own Kumaon Regiment, the Scinde Horse was the first Armoured Regiment to be presented the Regimental Standard by Dr S Radhakrishan on 9 November 1961.

The regiment was equipped with Sherman tanks. It was also the first to get T-55 tanks in 1966 and amongst the first to get T-72s in 1980–81.

=== Indo-Pakistani War of 1965 ===
The regiment formed the role of ‘advance guard’ of the 15 Infantry Division in Lahore sector, led the charge and captured Dograi, thus earning the battle honour ‘Dograi’ and the theatre honour ‘Punjab 1965’. Second Lieutenant Ravinder Singh Bedi was awarded with the Vir Chakra, Major Jagtar Singh Sangha, Dafadar Dharam Singh and Sowar Sulakhan Singh with the Sena Medal and Major Bhisham Ohri was Mentioned in dispatches.

=== Indo-Pakistani War of 1971 ===
The regiment spearheaded the advance of the 36 Infantry Division. It was deployed in Shakargarh. On the night of December 8, the regiment crossed into Pakistani territory and established itself near Nainan Kot. On December 10, Pakistani forces launched a powerful armored counterattack which Lt. Col. Sukhjit Singh's regiment successfully resisted. Leading from the front, Lt. Col. Sukhjit Singh directed his tanks with great skill. His unit forced the Pakistani force to retreat after the loss of only one tank. The next day, under heavy artillery and mortar fire, Lt. Col. Sukhjit Singh led an operation to capture enemy tanks at Malakpur. In the ensuing engagement, his regiment destroyed eight Pakistani tanks and captured one officer, two junior commissioned officers and two other soldiers. Lieutenant Colonel Sukhjit Singh was awarded the Maha Vir Chakra for his gallant actions. Second Lieutenant Kanwarjit Singh and Naib Risaldar Dayal Singh were awarded the Vir Chakra, Second Lieutenant Rajendra Singh the Sena Medal and Captain Malvinder Singh Purewal, Captain Brijendra Singh, Lance Dafaddar Roshan Lal, Sowar Kuldip Singh were Mentioned-in-Despatches.

=== United Nations Operation in Somalia II ===
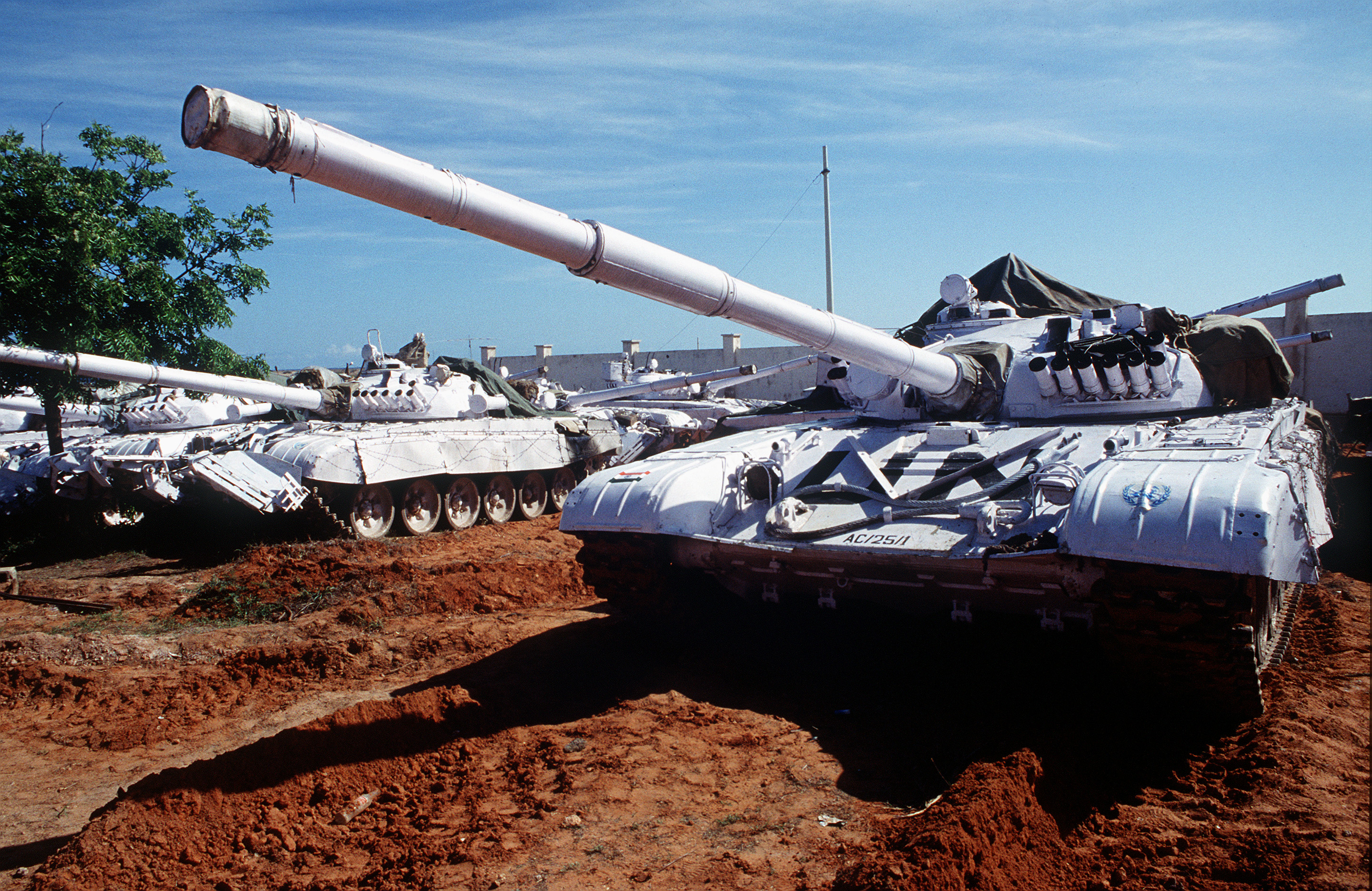
Indian T-72 tanks during the United Nations mission in Kismayo, Somalia

The regiment took part in United Nations Operation in Somalia II (UNOSOM II) and was awarded the United Nations Somalia Medal on 24 August 1994.

=== Other achievements ===
The regiment was awarded the Army Commander's Unit Citation (South Western Command) on 25 February 2011.

The regiment was affiliated to the Shivalik-class stealth multi-role frigate INS Satpura on 5 October 2012.

== Notable Officers ==
- Major General Sir William Henry Rodes Green KCSI CB
- General Sir George de Symons Barrow GCB, KCMG - General Officer Commanding Eastern Command between 1924 and 1928
- Brigadier Sukhjit Singh - Maha Vir Chakra awardee
- Lieutenant General Ajay Kumar Singh PVSM AVSM SM VSM - Commissioned into 7th Light Cavalry, he commanded both 7th Cavalry as well as Scinde Horse. He was General Officer Commanding-in-Chief of Southern Command between 2011–13 and then went on to become Lieutenant Governor of Andaman and Nicobar Islands between 2013 and 2016.
- Lieutenant General Devendra Sharma AVSM SM - Commanded XI Corps between 2022–23 and presently General Officer Commanding in Chief Army Training Command.
