= 4th Indian Cavalry Brigade =

4th Indian Cavalry Brigade may refer to

- 4th (Meerut) Cavalry Brigade of the British Indian Army in the First World War
- 4th (Secunderabad) Cavalry Brigade of the British Indian Army in the Second World War
- Designation held by the Lucknow Cavalry Brigade of the British Indian Army from September 1920 to 1923
