= British 4th Cavalry Division =

British 4th Cavalry Division may refer to:

- 1st Indian Cavalry Division which was designated 4th Cavalry Division from November 1916 to March 1918 in France in World War I
- 4th Cavalry Division (British Indian Army) which served from July 1918 in Palestine in World War I
