= 5th Indian Cavalry Brigade =

5th Indian Cavalry Brigade may refer to

- 5th (Mhow) Cavalry Brigade of the British Indian Army in the First World War
- Designation held by the 4th (Secunderabad) Cavalry Brigade of the British Indian Army from September 1920 to 1923
