= Wilfrith Green =

British Army brigadier-general (1872–1937)

Brigadier-General Wilfrith Green CB CMG DSO
- Born: Wilfrith Gerald Key Green; 3 November 1872; St Davids, Pembrokeshire, Wales
- Died: 29 May 1937 (aged 64); Penybont, Radnorshire, Wales
- Military career
- Allegiance: United Kingdom
- Branch: British Indian Army
- Rank: Brigadier-General
- Units: Green Howards; East Yorkshire Regiment; 32nd Lancers; 36th Jacob's Horse
- Commands: 10th Cavalry Brigade; 1st Indian Cavalry Brigade
- Conflicts: First World War; Western Front; Sinai and Palestine campaign
- Awards: Order of the Bath; Order of St Michael and St George; Distinguished Service Order

Brigadier-General Wilfrith Gerald Key Green CB CMG DSO (3 November 1872 – 29 May 1937) was a Welsh officer in the British Army and later a brigadier-general in the British Indian Army. In the First World War he served on the Western Front and in the Sinai and Palestine campaign, where he commanded the 10th Cavalry Brigade. He also commanded the 1st Indian Cavalry Brigade in India after the war.

== Early life ==
Green was born at St Davids, Pembrokeshire, Wales the son of Alfred and Elizabeth Green, his father was a minor canon of St David's Cathedral.

== British Army ==
He was commissioned as a second-lieutenant into the 3rd Battalion, Green Howards (Princess of Wales's Own Yorkshire Regiment) on 19 November 1892, part of the militia. He later transferred to the regular battalions of the East Yorkshire Regiment. On 3 October 1897 he transferred from the East Yorkshire Regiment, still as a second-lieutenant but with seniority from 7 December 1895 to the Indian Staff Corps after a period of probation.

== Indian Army ==
He was posted to the 32nd Lancers as of 20 March 1897. He was promoted Lieutenant 7 March 1898 and was promoted to captain 7 November 1904.

He had transferred to the 36th Jacob's Horse as a Squadron Commander 2 October 1910. He was Aide-de-Camp to the General Officer Commanding the 3rd (Lahore) Division from 21 March 1911 to 15 October 1911.

This was followed with his promotion to major on 7 December 1913.

In the First World War 36th Jacob's Horse was in the 8th (Lucknow) Cavalry Brigade, part of the 1st Indian Cavalry Division, that was sent to the Western Front in France in 1914. Green was appointed temporary commandant of the regiment 21 November 1915, a position he would hold, on and off, until 1921. In December 1917, serving as a temporary lieutenant-colonel he was made a Companion of the Distinguished Service Order.

In April 1918 the Indian cavalry regiments were moved from France to the Sinai and Palestine campaign. Green was given command of the 10th Cavalry Brigade in the place of Richard Howard-Vyse on 21 September 1918 and was granted the temporary rank of brigadier general whilst employed in this role. At the time he was still only a substantive major, but now a brevet lieutenant colonel and temporary brigadier general.

For his war service he was made a Companion of the Order of St Michael and St George in 1919.

== Post war ==
Following a successful war service Green was promoted to lieutenant-colonel in May 1920. That was followed by promotion to colonel, and another brigade command, this time the 1st Indian Cavalry Brigade. He was invested into the Order of the Bath in 1927, just before transferring to the unemployed list then finally retiring on 18 February 1928.

== Family life ==
Green married Lilian. His elder son Brigadier Percy William Powlett Green died on 23 February 2004. His younger son Wing Commander Wilfrith Peter Green was killed in action with the Royal Air Force on 1 March 1945. Green died at Penybont on 29 May 1937 aged 64.
