= General Beatty =

General Beatty may refer to:

- Guy Beatty (1870–1954), British Indian Army major general
- John Beatty (Ohio banker) (1828–1914), Union Army brigadier general
- Samuel Beatty (general) (1820–1885), Union Army brigadier general and brevet major general
