= 1st (Risalpur) Cavalry Brigade =

Military unit

Mardan Brigade Nowshera Cavalry Brigade Risalpur Cavalry Brigade 1st (Risalpur) Cavalry Brigade 1st Indian Cavalry Brigade
- Active: 1 January 1906 – November 1940
- Country: British India
- Allegiance: British Crown
- Branch: British Indian Army
- Type: Cavalry
- Size: Brigade
- Part of: 1st (Peshawar) Division; Peshawar District
- Garrison/HQ: Risalpur Cantonment
- Service: First World War; Third Anglo-Afghan War; Second World War

Commanders
- Notable commanders: Br.-Gen. G.A.H. Beatty; Br.-Gen. W.G.K. Green; Brig. E. de Burgh

The 1st (Risalpur) Cavalry Brigade was a cavalry brigade of the British Indian Army formed in 1906 as a result of the Kitchener Reforms. It remained in India during the First World War but took an active part in the Third Anglo-Afghan War in 1919.

It was on the North West Frontier in September 1939, and converted to Risalpur Training Brigade (later 155th Indian Infantry Brigade) in November 1940.

== History ==
=== Formation ===
The Kitchener Reforms, carried out during Lord Kitchener's tenure as Commander-in-Chief, India (1902–09), completed the unification of the three former Presidency armies, the Punjab Frontier Force, the Hyderabad Contingent and other local forces into one Indian Army. Kitchener identified the Indian Army's main task as the defence of the North-West Frontier against foreign aggression (particularly Russian expansion into Afghanistan) with internal security relegated to a secondary role. The Army was organized into divisions and brigades that would act as field formations but also included internal security troops.

The brigade was formed on 1 January 1906 as Mardan Brigade (Note: 1 January 1906 was the appointment date of the brigade's first commanding officer.) and in June 1907 it was renamed as Nowshera Cavalry Brigade. In 1910, it was renamed again, this time as 1st (Risalpur) Cavalry Brigade. Other than a period from September 1920 until 1927 when it was simply numbered as 1st Indian Cavalry Brigade, it retained this identity until finally broken up in November 1940.

=== First World War ===
At the outbreak of the First World War, the brigade was headquartered in the Risalpur Cantonment and commanded the following units:

- 13th Duke of Connaught's Lancers (Note: The 13th Duke of Connaught's Lancers (Watson's Horse) of the First World War era was unrelated to the 13th Duke of Connaught's Own Lancers of the Second, despite the close similarity of names. The earlier regiment was amalgamated with the 16th Cavalry in 1921 to form the 6th Duke of Connaught's Own Lancers whereas the latter regiment was formed in 1923 by the amalgamation of 31st Duke of Connaught's Own Lancers and 32nd Lancers.)
- 14th Murray's Jat Lancers
- 1st Duke of York's Own Skinner's Horse
- Queen Victoria's Own Corps of Guides (Frontier Force) (Lumsden's) Cavalry
- M Battery, Royal Horse Artillery
- Queen Victoria's Own Corps of Guides (Frontier Force) (Lumsden's) Infantry (at Mardan)

Of the six cavalry brigades in the Indian Army in August 1914, the 1st (Risalpur) Cavalry Brigade was the only one that was not sent to the Western Front. (Note: The other five pre-war Indian cavalry brigades were formed into the 1st and 2nd Indian Cavalry Divisions and sent to the Western Front. These were: 2nd (Sialkot) Cavalry Brigade of 2nd (Rawalpindi) Division; 3rd (Ambala) Cavalry Brigade of 3rd (Lahore) Division; 7th (Meerut) Cavalry Brigade of 7th (Meerut) Division; 8th (Lucknow) Cavalry Brigade of 8th (Lucknow) Division; 9th (Secunderabad) Cavalry Brigade of 9th (Secunderabad) Division; They were joined by the 5th (Mhow) Cavalry Brigade, formed on 11 November 1914.) It remained in India throughout the war, guarding the Frontier (with particular responsibility for the post at Mardan). A large number of units rotated in and out of the brigade throughout the war. (Note: Besides the units assigned in August 1914, the brigade also commanded the following at various times during the war: 21st (Empress of India's) Lancers; 30th Lancers (Gordon's Horse); 5th Cavalry; two squadrons, 17th Cavalry; 33rd Queen Victoria's Own Light Cavalry; 4th Cavalry; 1st Battalion, Guides Infantry; 2nd Battalion, Guides Infantry; 55th Coke's Rifles (Frontier Force); 54th Sikhs (Frontier Force); 3rd Battalion, Guides Infantry; 1st (King's) Dragoon Guards; 22nd Machine Gun Squadron; 1st Field Troop, 1st King George's Own Sappers and Miners)

=== Third Anglo-Afghan War ===
Under mobilization plans drawn up in July 1918, IV Corps, with 1st (Peshawar) Division under command, would have included 1st and 10th Indian Cavalry Brigades with:

- 21st (Empress of India's) Lancers
- 1st Duke of York's Own Lancers (Skinner's Horse)
- 33rd Queen Victoria's Own Light Cavalry
- 22nd Machine Gun Squadron
- M Battery, RHA
- 1st Field Troop, 1st King George's Own Sappers and Miners

In August 1918, the 21st (Empress of India's) Lancers traded places with the 1st (King's) Dragoon Guards in 4th (Meerut) Cavalry Brigade and the latter mobilized with the brigade in May 1919. At Dakka (Note: Dakka was a village in Afghan territory, north west of the Khyber Pass.) on 16 May, the 1st (King's) Dragoon Guards made the last recorded charge by a British horsed cavalry regiment.

=== Second World War ===
The brigade was on the North West Frontier in September 1939 under the command of Peshawar District. It commanded the following units at the outbreak of the Second World War:

- 16th/5th Lancers (departed in March 1940 for the United Kingdom)
- Probyn's Horse (5th King Edward VII's Own Lancers) (transferred in January 1940 to 1st Indian Motor Brigade)
- The Guides Cavalry (10th Queen Victoria's Own Frontier Force) (at Mardan; left on 25 September 1939 for Khojak Brigade)
- 5th Battalion, 12th Frontier Force Regiment (at Mardan)
- 1st Cavalry Brigade Signals Troop (transferred in January 1940 to 1st Indian Motor Brigade)

The following units were attached:

- Royal Deccan Horse (9th Horse) (October 1939 to January 1940)
- 13th Duke of Connaught's Own Lancers (November 1939 to February 1940 and April 1940 onwards)
- Jodhpur Sardar Rissala (ISF) (January to October 1940)

The brigade lost most of its units to the 1st Indian Motor Brigade (designate) in early 1940. In the event, 1st Indian Motor Brigade was actually formed as 1st Indian Armoured Brigade at Sialkot on 1 July 1940. In November, 1st (Risalpur) Cavalry Brigade was reconstituted as Risalpur Training Brigade and in March 1944 as 155th Indian Infantry Brigade.

== Commanders ==
The Mardan Brigade / Nowshera Cavalry Brigade / 1st (Risalpur) Cavalry Brigade / 1st Indian Cavalry Brigade had the following commanders:

From	Rank	Name	Notes
1 January 1906	Major-General	M.H.S. Grover	
1 December 1907	Major-General	F.W.P. Angelo	
17 November 1912	Major-General	J.G. Turner	
15 September 1914	Brigadier-General	S.F. Crocker	
18 June 1916	Brigadier-General	F.G.H. Davies	
January 1919	Brigadier-General	P. Holland-Pryor	
October 1921	Brigadier-General	G.A.H. Beatty	
April 1925	Brigadier-General	W.G.K. Green	
September 1927	Brigadier	J. Van der Byl	
September 1931	Brigadier	E. de Burgh	
August 1934	Brigadier	T.A.A. Wilson	
December 1934	Brigadier	D.K. McLeod	
December 1936	Brigadier	H. Macdonald	
August 1939	Brigadier	A.A.E. Filose	Brigade dispersed in November 1940

== See also ==
- List of Indian Army Brigades in World War II

== Bibliography ==
- Gaylor, John (1996). Sons of John Company: The Indian and Pakistan Armies 1903–1991 (2nd ed.). Tunbridge Wells: Parapress. ISBN 1-898594-41-4.
- Haythornthwaite, Philip J. (1996). The World War One Source Book. London: Arms and Armour Press. ISBN 1-85409-351-7.
- Kempton, Chris (2003b). 'Loyalty & Honour', The Indian Army September 1939 – August 1947. Vol. Part II Brigades. Milton Keynes: The Military Press. ISBN 0-85420-238-2.
- Kempton, Chris (2003c). 'Loyalty & Honour', The Indian Army September 1939 – August 1947. Vol. Part III. Milton Keynes: The Military Press. ISBN 0-85420-248-X.
- Mackie, Colin (June 2015). "Army Commands 1900-2011" (PDF). www.gulabin.com. Archived from the original (PDF) on 5 July 2015.
- Nafziger, George (n.d.). "The Indian Army 3 September 1939" (PDF). Fort Leavenworth: Combined Arms Research Library, United States Army Combined Arms Center.
- Perry, F.W. (1993). Order of Battle of Divisions Part 5B. Indian Army Divisions. Newport: Ray Westlake Military Books. ISBN 1-871167-23-X.
