= XI Brigade, Royal Horse Artillery =

Former horse artillery brigade of the British Army

XI Brigade, RHA
- Active: 1 March 1901 – August 1914
- Country: United Kingdom
- Branch: British Army
- Type: Artillery
- Size: Battalion

XI Brigade, Royal Horse Artillery was a brigade (Note: The basic organic unit of the Royal Artillery was, and is, the Battery. When grouped together they formed brigades, in the same way that infantry battalions or cavalry regiments were grouped together in brigades. At the outbreak of World War I, a field artillery brigade of headquarters (4 officers, 37 other ranks), three batteries (5 and 193 each), and a brigade ammunition column (4 and 154) had a total strength just under 800 so was broadly comparable to an infantry battalion (just over 1,000) or a cavalry regiment (about 550). Like an infantry battalion, an artillery brigade was usually commanded by a Lieutenant-Colonel. Artillery brigades were redesignated as regiments in 1938.) of the Royal Horse Artillery which existed in the early part of the 20th century. It was dissolved at the outbreak of World War I as its constituent batteries were posted to other formations.

== History ==
=== Background ===
Royal Horse Artillery brigades did not exist as an organizational or operational grouping of batteries until 1 July 1859 when the Horse Brigade, Royal Artillery was formed. The brigade system was extended to five (later six) brigades when the horse artillery of the Honourable East India Company had been transferred to the British Army in 1861. These brigades were reduced to five in 1871, then to three (of 10 batteries each) in 1877 and to two (of 13 batteries each) in 1882. The brigade system was finally abolished in 1889.

As battery designations were tied to the brigade that the battery was assigned to, batteries were redesignated in a bewildering sequence as they were transferred between brigades. For example, E Battery of C Brigade (E/C Bty) might become N Battery of A Brigade (N/A Bty) upon transfer. Henceforth, batteries were designated in a single alphabetical sequence in order of seniority from date of formation.

The brigade system was revived in 1901. Each brigade now commanded just two batteries and a small staff (a Lieutenant-Colonel in command, an adjutant and a brigade sergeant major). Initially, batteries were not assigned to brigades in any particular order, but in 1906, at the insistence of Edward VII, brigades were redesignated so that batteries were roughly in order of seniority (hence I Brigade commanded A Battery and B Battery).

=== Formation ===
XI Brigade, RHA was formed on 1 March 1901 as the XIII Brigade-Division, RHA with T Battery and U Battery. In 1903 it was redesignated as XIII Brigade, RHA and was stationed in South Africa at Krugersdorp (T Battery) and Manchester (U Battery). On 1 October 1906, it was redesignated as XI Brigade, RHA.

By the time World War I broke out, the brigade was split up. T Battery was at Abbassia, Egypt serving in the Force in Egypt. It returned to the United Kingdom where it joined XIV Brigade in 7th Division on 21 December. U Battery was at Lucknow with 8th (Lucknow) Division and on mobilization was assigned to the newly formed I Indian Brigade, RHA with 1st Indian Cavalry Division (attached to 8th (Lucknow) Cavalry Brigade) and sailed for the Western Front in October 1914. Without any batteries under command, the brigade HQ was dissolved.

== See also ==
- 11th Regiment, Royal Horse Artillery (Honourable Artillery Company) for a similarly numbered regiment in World War II.

== Bibliography ==
- Becke, Archibald F. (1935). Order of Battle of Divisions Part 1–The Regular British Divisions. London: HMSO. OCLC 4405016.
- Clarke, W.G. (1993). Horse Gunners: The Royal Horse Artillery, 200 Years of Panache and Professionalism. Woolwich: The Royal Artillery Institution. ISBN 09520762-0-9.
- Frederick, J.B.M. (1984). Lineage Book of British Land Forces 1660-1978. Wakefield, Yorkshire: Microform Academic Publishers. ISBN 1-85117-009-X.
- Perry, F.W. (1993). Order of Battle of Divisions Part 5B. Indian Army Divisions. Newport: Ray Westlake Military Books. ISBN 1-871167-23-X.
