= Alan Hartley =

British Army general (1882–1954)

General Sir Alan Hartley GCIE KCSI CB DSO
- Born: 24 October 1882
- Died: 7 December 1954 (aged 72)
- Military career
- Allegiance: United Kingdom
- Branch: British Army; British Indian Army
- Service years: 1901–1944
- Rank: General
- Service number: 98489
- Unit: Durham Light Infantry
- Commands: Commander-in-Chief, India (1942); Northern Command, India (1940–42); Rawalpindi District (1939–40); Waziristan District (1937–38); 4th (Secunderabad) Cavalry Brigade (1932–33); 1st (Risalpur) Cavalry Brigade (1930–31); 5th King Edward's Own Probyn's Horse (1927–31); 1st Battalion, York and Lancaster Regiment (1917–18)
- Conflicts: Second Boer War; First World War; Second World War
- Awards: Knight Grand Commander of the Order of the Indian Empire; Knight Commander of the Order of the Star of India; Companion of the Order of the Bath; Companion of the Distinguished Service Order; Mentioned in Despatches (5)

General Sir Alan Fleming Hartley, GCIE, KCSI, CB, DSO (24 October 1882 – 7 December 1954) was a British Indian Army officer during the Second World War.

== Military career ==
Born in 1882, the son of Dr. Reginald Hartley, Hartley was educated at Charterhouse School and the Royal Military College, Sandhurst. He was commissioned into the 1st Battalion, Durham Light Infantry as a second lieutenant on 8 January 1901.

Hartley first saw active service in the Second Boer War (from May 1901 to May 1902), where he was for a period aide-de-camp to Major-General R. A. P. Clements. After the end of this war, he joined the 1st Battalion of his regiment as it was sent to India in November 1902, where it was stationed in Wellington, Madras Presidency. He was promoted to lieutenant on 10 May 1905 (seniority 5 June 1903), transferred to the Indian Army and appointed to the 11th King Edward's Own Lancers (Probyn's Horse) that year.

Hartley served in the First World War in France, the Balkans and Mesopotamia, being mentioned in despatches three times and appointed a Companion of the Distinguished Service Order. He was promoted to captain on 8 January 1910, to major in June 1917, and to acting lieutenant-colonel in 1917, commanding the 1st Battalion, York and Lancaster Regiment at Salonika.

After attending the Staff College, Quetta, from 1919 to 1920, from May 1921 to July 1924 Hartley was a general staff officer grade 2 in India and from December 1924 to December 1926 he was an instructor at the Staff College, Quetta. From April 1927 to April 1931 he was the commanding officer of the 5th King Edward's Own Probyn's Horse, and he saw service during the operations on the North West Frontier 1930–1931 as officiating commander, 1st (Risalpur) Cavalry Brigade and was mentioned in despatches in the London Gazette 26 June 1931. He attended the Imperial Defence College in 1931. In January 1932 he became commander of the 4th (Secunderabad) Cavalry Brigade after which, in September 1933, he was made director of Military Operations and Intelligence at Army Headquarters, India, in New Delhi. A brigadier by 1935, he was appointed a Companion of the Order of the Bath in the 1936 New Year Honours and promoted to major-general on 9 January 1936. He was appointed officiating commander of Waziristan District from May to December 1937, then formally appointed to command from December 1937 to July 1938, where he was again mentioned in despatches in the London Gazette 18 February 1938. He was appointed commander of Rawalpindi District in July 1938.

By the start of the Second World War, Hartley was commander of Rawalpindi District. On 6 June 1940, he was appointed General Officer Commanding-in-chief Northern Command, India and promoted to lieutenant general. He was promoted to general in the Indian Army on 27 January 1941 and knighted in that year's Birthday Honours list as a Knight Commander of the Order of the Star of India. In January 1942 he succeeded General Sir Archibald Wavell for a short time as Commander-in-Chief, India. Wavell was reappointed in March 1942 and Hartley was appointed deputy commander-in-chief. In spring 1942 he was fighting the Japanese on the eastern border of India. He was appointed a Knight Grand Commander of the Order of the Indian Empire in January 1944. He retired 29 February 1944.

== Family ==
In 1914 Hartley married Phillippa, daughter of P. H. Osborne of Australia. She was decorated with the Kaisar-i-Hind Medal in Gold in 1943.

== Bibliography ==
- Smart, Nick (2005). Biographical Dictionary of British Generals of the Second World War. Barnesley: Pen & Sword. ISBN 1844150496.

Military offices
| Preceded by Sir John Coleridge | GOC-in-C Northern Command, India; 1940–1942 | Succeeded by Sir Cyril Noyes |
| Preceded by Sir Archibald Wavell | Commander-in-Chief, India; January–March 1942 | Succeeded by Sir Archibald Wavell |
