= 4th (Secunderabad) Cavalry Brigade =

Secunderabad Cavalry Brigade 5th Indian Cavalry Brigade 4th Indian Cavalry Brigade 4th (Secunderabad) Cavalry Brigade
- Active: 3 February 1915 – July 1940
- Country: British India
- Allegiance: British Crown
- Branch: British Indian Army
- Type: Cavalry
- Size: Brigade
- Part of: 9th (Secunderabad) Division; Poona District; Deccan District
- Garrison/HQ: Secunderabad; Bolarum
- Service: First World War; Second World War

Commanders
- Notable commanders: Br.-Gen. W.G.K. Green; Brig. A.F. Hartley; Brig. A.G.O. Mosley Mayne

The 4th (Secunderabad) Cavalry Brigade was a cavalry brigade of the British Indian Army that formed part of the Indian Army during the First World War. It was formed as Secunderabad Cavalry Brigade in February 1915 to replace the original brigade that had been mobilized as the 9th (Secunderabad) Cavalry Brigade for service on the Western Front. It remained in India throughout the war.

The brigade continued to exist between the wars and by September 1939 it was designated 4th (Secunderabad) Cavalry Brigade. It briefly served as part of the Indian Army during the Second World War before being broken up in July 1940.

== History ==
=== First World War ===
At the outbreak of the First World War, the Secunderabad Cavalry Brigade was part of the 9th (Secunderabad) Division. It was mobilized in August 1914 as the 9th (Secunderabad) Cavalry Brigade with the first elements of Indian Expeditionary Force A. It departed for the Western Front, arriving in France on 12 October 1914. It was attached to the newly formed 1st Indian Cavalry Division before joining the 2nd Indian Cavalry Division on 23 December 1914.

On 3 February 1915 (Note: The first commanding officer was appointed on 3 February 1915.) a new Secunderabad Cavalry Brigade was formed in 9th (Secunderabed) Division to replace the original brigade and to take over its area responsibilities. The brigade served with the division in India throughout the First World War. The brigade remained unnumbered throughout the First World War, the only unnumbered Indian cavalry brigade. (Note: In contrast, the brigade formed to replace the 7th (Meerut) Cavalry Brigade in similar circumstance – 14th (Meerut) Cavalry Brigade – was numbered.)

=== Between the world wars ===
The brigade continued to exist between the world wars. In September 1920 it was redesignated as the 5th Indian Cavalry Brigade and in 1923 as 4th Indian Cavalry Brigade. Later in the decade it regained its geographical designation as 4th (Secunderabad) Cavalry Brigade. From 1920 it was under the command of the Poona District and from 1927 under the Deccan District.

=== Second World War ===
At the outbreak of the Second World War, the brigade was still under the command of Deccan District. It was broken up in July 1940 with some of its units moving to the 3rd Indian Motor Brigade which was forming at Sialkot at this time.

== Orders of battle ==
=== First World War units ===
The Secunderabad Cavalry Brigade commanded the following units in the First World War:

- 7th (Queen's Own) Hussars (joined on formation from Bangalore; left in October 1915 for 4th (Meerut) Cavalry Brigade)
- 22nd Sam Browne's Cavalry (Frontier Force) (arrived at Secunderabad in October 1914 from Jacobabad, 4th (Quetta) Division and joined the brigade on formation; left in October 1916 for 6th Indian Cavalry Brigade in Mesopotamia)
- 27th Light Cavalry (arrived at Secunderabad in October 1914 from Nasirabad, 5th (Mhow) Division and joined the brigade on formation; left in July 1916 for Lucknow)
- 7th Hariana Lancers (joined in October 1916 from Mesopotamia)
- 8th Cavalry (joined in October 1916 from Jhansi, 5th (Mhow) Division)

=== Second World War units ===
The 4th (Secunderabad) Cavalry Brigade commanded the following units in the Second World War:

- 14th/20th King's Hussars (left in November 1939 to join 3rd (Meerut) Cavalry Brigade)
- 7th Light Cavalry (remained at Bolarum while mechanising)
- Prince Albert Victor's Own Cavalry (11th Frontier Force) (joined 3rd Indian Motor Brigade in July 1940)
- 3rd Field Regiment, RA (stationed at Trimulgherry, Secunderabad; moved to Quetta in February 1941)
  - 18th, 62nd, 65th, 75th Batteries
- 4th Cavalry Brigade Signals Troop (to 3rd Indian Motor Brigade in July 1940 as 3rd Indian Motor Brigade Signals Troop)

== Commanders ==
The Secunderabad Cavalry Brigade / 5th Indian Cavalry Brigade / 4th Indian Cavalry Brigade / 4th (Secunderabad) Cavalry Brigade had the following commanders:

From	Rank	Name	Notes
3 February 1915	Brigadier-General	H. Kennedy	Appointment vacated 20 February 1915
14 April 1915	Brigadier-General	F.H.B. Commerline	
April 1920	Brigadier-General	A.G. Pritchard	
January 1921	Brigadier-General	C.A.C. Godwin	
December 1923	Brigadier-General	W.G.K. Green	
April 1925	Brigadier-General	G.A.H. Beatty	
October 1925	Brigadier-General	E.D. Giles	
August 1927	Brigadier-General	H.A. Tomkinson	
December 1927	Brigadier	A. Campbell-Ross	
January 1932	Brigadier	A.F. Hartley	
September 1933	Brigadier	D.K. McLeod	
December 1934	Brigadier	G. de la P. Beresford	
September 1938	Brigadier	A.G.O. Mosley Mayne	
September 1939			Commander unknown

== A note on name and number ==
The brigade carried several designations during its existence. This can be a cause for confusion as other Indian cavalry brigades carried the same or similar designations at different times, and even at the same time.

- a particular cause for confusion is that the Secunderabad Cavalry Brigade was in existence in India at the same time that the original brigade was serving as the 9th (Secunderabad) Cavalry Brigade on the Western Front. This brigade was referred to by geographical name, rather than by number, so as to avoid confusion with the British 9th Cavalry Brigade also serving on the Western Front at the same time.
- the brigade was numbered as 5th from September 1920 to 1923. The 5th (Mhow) Cavalry Brigade had been formed on 11 November 1914 for service on the Western Front until it was broken up in March 1918.
- the brigade was numbered as 4th from 1923 onwards when the previous 4th Indian Cavalry Brigade (formerly Lucknow Cavalry Brigade) was broken up. At this time, the 4th (Meerut) Cavalry Brigade became the 3rd (Meerut) Cavalry Brigade.

== See also ==
- List of Indian Army Brigades in World War II

== Bibliography ==
- Gaylor, John (1996). Sons of John Company: The Indian and Pakistan Armies 1903–1991 (2nd ed.). Tunbridge Wells: Parapress. ISBN 1-898594-41-4.
- Joslen, Lt-Col H.F. (1990) [1st. Pub. HMSO:1960]. Orders of Battle, Second World War, 1939–1945. London: London Stamp Exchange. ISBN 0-948130-03-2.
- Kempton, Chris (2003b). 'Loyalty & Honour', The Indian Army September 1939 – August 1947. Vol. Part II Brigades. Milton Keynes: The Military Press. ISBN 0-85420-238-2.
- Kempton, Chris (2003c). 'Loyalty & Honour', The Indian Army September 1939 – August 1947. Vol. Part III. Milton Keynes: The Military Press. ISBN 0-85420-248-X.
- Mackie, Colin (June 2015). "Army Commands 1900-2011" (PDF). www.gulabin.com. Archived from the original (PDF) on 5 July 2015.
- Nafziger, George (n.d.). "The Indian Army 3 September 1939" (PDF). Fort Leavenworth: Combined Arms Research Library, United States Army Combined Arms Center.
- Perry, F.W. (1993). Order of Battle of Divisions Part 5B. Indian Army Divisions. Newport: Ray Westlake Military Books. ISBN 1-871167-23-X.
