= 5th (Mhow) Cavalry Brigade =

- Active: 11 November 1914 – March 1918
- Country: British India
- Allegiance: British Crown
- Branch: British Indian Army
- Type: Cavalry
- Size: Brigade
- Part of: 2nd Indian Cavalry Division; 1st Indian Cavalry Division
- Engagements: First World War Western Front Battle of Cambrai (1917)

Commanders
- Notable commanders: Maj.-Gen. H.D. Fanshawe; Br.-Gen. G. de S. Barrow

The 5th (Mhow) Cavalry Brigade was a cavalry brigade of the British Indian Army that saw active service in the Indian Army during the First World War. Formed in November 1914, it served on the Western Front as part of the 2nd and 1st Indian Cavalry Divisions until it was broken up in March 1918.

== History ==
Uniquely amongst the six Indian cavalry brigades sent to the Western Front in the First World War, the 5th (Mhow) Cavalry Brigade was not a pre war formation. (Note: The other five Indian cavalry brigades sent to the Western Front in the First World War were: 2nd (Sialkot) Cavalry Brigade of 2nd (Rawalpindi) Division; 3rd (Ambala) Cavalry Brigade of 3rd (Lahore) Division; 7th (Meerut) Cavalry Brigade of 7th (Meerut) Division; 8th (Lucknow) Cavalry Brigade of 8th (Lucknow) Division; 9th (Secunderabad) Cavalry Brigade of 9th (Secunderabad) Division; The only remaining pre-war cavalry brigade – 1st (Risalpur) Cavalry Brigade of 1st (Peshawar) Division – stayed in India throughout the war.) The brigade was formed on 11 November 1914 (Note: 11 November 1914 was the appointment date of the brigade's first commanding officer.) from units in 5th (Mhow) Division and the 6th (Inniskilling) Dragoons from Muttra.

In company with the 7th (Meerut) Cavalry Brigade, it departed Bombay on 19 November 1914 and landed at Marseille on 14–16 December. It joined the 2nd Indian Cavalry Division which was formally constituted on 14 December. The division concentrated around Orléans on 20–24 December and moved up to the Front on 1–4 January 1915. While in France, the brigade was known by its geographical rather than numerical designation so as to avoid confusion with the British 5th Cavalry Brigade also serving on the Western Front at the same time.

On 15 September 1915, the brigade swapped places with the 3rd (Ambala) Cavalry Brigade of 1st Indian Cavalry Division.

Other than the Battle of Cambrai when it helped to hold the German counter-attack, it was not involved in battle. Instead, it was held in reserve in case of a breakthrough, although it did send parties to the trenches on a number of occasions. They would hold the line, or act as Pioneers; such parties were designated as the Mhow Battalion.

On 1 December 1917, Lance-Daffadar Gobind Singh of the 28th Light Cavalry, attached to 2nd Lancers (Gardner's Horse), won the Victoria Cross during the Battle of Cambrai.

Dissolved

In March 1918, the brigade was broken up in France. The British units (6th (Inniskilling) Dragoons and A Battery, Royal Horse Artillery) remained in France, 11th Machine Gun Squadron was broken up on 14 April 1918 and the Indian elements were sent to Egypt. On 24 April 1918, these were merged with the 6th Mounted Brigade of the Yeomanry Mounted Division. On 22 July 1918 the 6th Mounted Brigade was redesignated as 10th Cavalry Brigade and the division as 4th Cavalry Division.

== Order of battle ==
The 5th (Mhow) Cavalry Brigade commanded the following units on the Western Front:

- 6th (Inniskilling) Dragoons (joined from Muttra, 7th (Meerut) Division)
- 2nd Lancers (Gardner's Horse) (joined from Jubbulpore, 5th (Mhow) Division)
- 38th King George's Own Central India Horse (joined from Jhansi, 5th (Mhow) Division)
- X Battery, Royal Horse Artillery (joined in December 1914 from XIII Brigade, Royal Horse Artillery at Mhow, 5th (Mhow) Division; transferred on 15 September 1915 to 3rd (Ambala) Cavalry Brigade when the brigades swapped places) (Note: X Battery, Royal Horse Artillery was part of II Indian Brigade, Royal Horse Artillery but was attached to the brigade.)
- A Battery, Royal Horse Artillery (joined on 15 September 1915 from 3rd (Ambala) Cavalry Brigade) (Note: A Battery, Royal Horse Artillery was part of I Indian Brigade, Royal Horse Artillery but was attached to the brigade.)
- Signal Troop
- 11th Machine Gun Squadron (from 29 February 1916) (Note: Formed on 29 February 1916 from the machine gun sections of 6th (Inniskilling) Dragoons, 2nd Lancers (Gardner's Horse) and 38th King George's Own Central India Horse.)

== Commanders ==
The 5th (Mhow) Cavalry Brigade had the following commanders:

From	Rank	Name	Notes
11 November 1914	Major-General	H.D. Fanshawe	
14 December 1914	Colonel	M.E. Willoghby	temporary
7 January 1915	Brigadier-General	G. de S. Barrow	
23 July 1915	Brigadier-General	N.W. Haig	Broken up in March 1918

== See also ==
- 4th (Secunderabad) Cavalry Brigade was designated as 5th Indian Cavalry Brigade from September 1920 to 1923
- Indian Cavalry Corps order of battle First World War
- Indian Expeditionary Force A

== Bibliography ==
- Becke, Archibald F. (1936). Order of Battle of Divisions Part 2A. The Territorial Force Mounted Divisions and the 1st-Line Territorial Force Divisions (42–56). London: HMSO. OCLC 4405016.
- Mackie, Colin (June 2015). "Army Commands 1900-2011" (PDF). gulabin.com. Archived from the original (PDF) on 5 July 2015.
- Perry, F.W. (1993). Order of Battle of Divisions Part 5B. Indian Army Divisions. Newport: Ray Westlake Military Books. ISBN 1-871167-23-X.
