= Charles Godwin =

British Indian Army general (1873–1951)

Lieutenant-General Sir Charles Godwin KCB CMG DSO*
- Born: Charles Alexander Campbell Godwin; 28 October 1873; Agra, Uttar Pradesh, British India
- Died: 18 July 1951 (age 77); Melrose, Roxburghshire, Scotland
- Military career
- Allegiance: United Kingdom
- Branch: British Indian Army
- Rank: Lieutenant-General
- Units: Madras Lancers; 23rd Cavalry (Frontier Force)
- Commands: 6th Mounted Brigade; 10th Cavalry Brigade; 5th Indian Cavalry Brigade; Secunderabad Garrison; Staff College, Quertta; Peshawar District
- Conflicts: North West Frontier; Mahsud Waziri blockade; First World War; North West Frontier (1930)
- Awards: Knight Commander of the Order of the Bath; Companion of the Order of St Michael and St George; Companion of the Distinguished Service Order

Lieutenant-General Sir Charles Alexander Campbell Godwin KCB CMG DSO* (28 October 1873 – 18 July 1951) was a cavalry officer in the British Indian Army.

Godwin was born in Agra, the son of Colonel Charles Henry Young Godwin, an Army surgeon, and Grace Mitilda Campbell. He initially joined the Madras Lancers, then transferred to the 23rd Cavalry a Frontier Force regiment. He fought in operations in India, on the North West Frontier and in the First World War, commanding Indian cavalry brigades, garrisons, and districts. He was also appointed an aide-de-camp to King George V.

== Career ==
=== Early service ===
Charles Alexander Campbell Godwin graduated from the Royal Military College, Sandhurst, as a Queen's Cadet in January 1895. Not being attached to any particular regiment, as a junior second-lieutenant, he initially spent time seconded to the Suffolk Regiment and the Welch Regiment in Secunderabad India. He then joined the Madras Lancers in 1895, but transferred to the 3rd Punjab Cavalry (later known as the 23rd Punjab Cavalry (Frontier Force)) in 1898. In April 1897 he was promoted to lieutenant, to captain in April 1904, and to major in March 1913.

During that time he became the regimental Adjutant in 1900, assisted in raising the North Waziristan Militia and served in operation on the North West Frontier between 1901–190 and during the Mahsud Blockade of 1902. In 1908 he attended the Indian Army's Staff College, Quetta. Graduating the following year he was appointed the brigade major for the Meerut Cavalry Brigade in 1911. Until 1913, when he became a General Staff officer Grade 2 (GSO2).

=== First World War ===
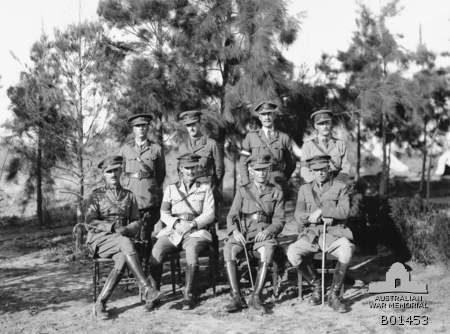
Senior officers of the Palestine campaign, 1918. Brigadier General C. A. C. Godwin, BGGS Desert Mounted Corps, sits on the extreme left.

With the outbreak of the First World War Godwin, in December 1914, returned to being a brigade major and his brigade was sent to the Western Front. The following year he returned to the General Staff as GSO1, with the rank of temporary lieutenant colonel a position he held until 1917. In January 1916, he was promoted to a brevet lieutenant-colonel.

In 1917 Godwin was sent to the Middle East to fight in the Sinai and Palestine campaign, giving command of the British yeomanry 6th Mounted Brigade, with the temporary rank of brigadier-general that September. In December he was awarded a Distinguished Service Order (DSO), The commendation for the award read; "For conspicuous gallantry and devotion to duty. He attacked and captured an enemy position in the face of heavy shell, machinegun and rifle fire. Later, he directed the attack by his brigade on a strong enemy position, and by his skill and determination contributed largely to the success of the operation". He was also awarded a bar to the DSO in January 1918. He was soon after in May 1918, promoted to brevet colonel but still a temporary brigadier-general. In May 1918 he was made a Companion of the Order of St Michael and St George, and returned to the General Staff that October. During the campaign Godwin's brigade had taken part in the advance on Jerusalem, the capture of Damascus and the battle of Aleppo.

=== Post war ===
With the end of the war Godwin and his troops remained in Syria attached to North Force until 1920. He was then once again assigned to the General Staff GSO1, and reverted to his brevet rank of colonel in February 1920. However he was promoted to substantive colonel in April that year.

He returned to India in January 1921 and, with the rank of colonel commandant, was again given his own command, the 5th Indian Cavalry Brigade and the Secunderabad Garrison. That August he was also appointed as aide-de-camp to King George V. In December 1923, he was promoted to major-general, and in December the next year made Major-General Cavalry attached to the Indian Army Headquarters. In April 1924 the King approved Godwin's appointment as Colonel of the 11th Prince Albert Victor's Own Cavalry (Frontier Force) which had been formed in 1921, by the amalgamation of his old regiment the 23rd Cavalry with the 21st Prince Albert Victor's Own Cavalry (Frontier Force) (Daly's Horse). His next appointment was in January 1927, was he became the Commandant of the Indian Army's Staff College, Quetta. He was given command of the Peshwar District in 1927, with promotion to lieutenant-general in December 1929. He was transferred to the unemployed list in December 1930. For operations on the North West Frontier in between 23 April and 12 September 1930, he was mentioned in dispatches by the then Commander-in-Chief of the Indian Army Field Marshal William Birdwood.

Sir Charles retired from the army in 1932.
