= 10th Cavalry Brigade (British Indian Army) =

2nd South Midland Mounted Brigade 2nd (2nd South Midland) Mounted Brigade 6th Mounted Brigade 10th Cavalry Brigade
- Active: 1908–1921
- Country: United Kingdom
- Allegiance: British Crown
- Branch: British Army; British Indian Army
- Type: Yeomanry, Cavalry
- Size: Brigade
- Part of: 2nd Mounted Division; Imperial Mounted Division; Yeomanry Mounted Division; 4th Cavalry Division
- HQ (peacetime): Oxford
- Engagements: First World War: Gallipoli 1915; Egypt and Palestine 1916–18

Commanders
- Notable commanders: Wilfrith Gerald Key Green

The 2nd South Midland Mounted Brigade (later numbered as the 6th Mounted Brigade) was a yeomanry brigade of the British Army, formed as part of the Territorial Force in 1908.

It served dismounted in the Gallipoli Campaign before being remounted to serve in the Sinai and Palestine Campaign in the First World War.

In April 1918, it was merged with elements of the 5th (Mhow) Cavalry Brigade to form 10th Cavalry Brigade. It remained in Palestine after the end of the war on occupation duties.

== Formation ==
Under the terms of the Territorial and Reserve Forces Act 1907 (7 Edw.7, c.9), the brigade was formed in 1908 as part of the Territorial Force. It consisted of three yeomanry regiments, a horse artillery battery and ammunition column, a transport and supply column and a field ambulance.

As the name suggests, the units were drawn from the southern part of the English Midlands, predominantly Berkshire, Buckinghamshire and Oxfordshire.

== First World War ==
=== 2nd South Midland Mounted Brigade ===
The brigade was embodied on 4 August 1914 upon the outbreak of the First World War. Initially, it concentrated in Berkshire and on 5 August 1914 joined the 1st Mounted Division. On 2 September it was transferred to the 2nd Mounted Division and in mid November 1914 it moved with its division to Norfolk on coastal defence duties.

On 19 September 1914, the Queen's Own Oxfordshire Hussars was posted to the BEF, joining the 4th Cavalry Brigade. The Queen's Own Dorset Yeomanry joined in the same month to replace them.

==== Egypt ====
In April 1915, the 2nd Mounted Division moved to Egypt arriving at Alexandria between 19 and 21 April and was posted to Cairo by the middle of May. In May 1915 the brigade was designated 2nd (2nd South Midland) Mounted Brigade.

It was dismounted in August 1915 and took part in the Gallipoli Campaign. Each regiment left a squadron headquarters and two troops (about 100 officers and men) in Egypt to look after the horses.

==== Gallipoli ====
The brigade landed at "A" Beach, Suvla Bay on 18 August and moved into bivouacs at Lala Baba on 20 August. On 21 August it advanced to Chocolate Hill via Salt Lake and Hetman Chair and took part in the attack on Scimitar Hill.

Due to losses during the Battle of Scimitar Hill and wastage during August 1915, the 2nd Mounted Division had to be reorganised. On 4 September 1915, the 1st Composite Mounted Brigade was formed from the 1st (1st South Midland), 2nd (2nd South Midland) and 5th (Yeomanry) Mounted Brigades. The brigade formed a battalion sized unit 2nd South Midland Regiment. The brigade embarked for Mudros on 31 October and returned to Egypt in December 1915 where it was reformed and remounted.

=== 6th Mounted Brigade ===
6th Mounted Brigade
Organisation, July 1917

- Royal Buckinghamshire Hussars
- Queen's Own Dorset Yeomanry
- Berkshire Yeomanry
- 17th Machine Gun Squadron
- 6th Mounted Brigade Signal Troop
- 2/South Midland Cavalry Field Ambulance, RAMC
- 4/1st North Midland Mobile Veterinary Section

The brigade left the 2nd Mounted Division on 17 January 1916 and was sent to the Western Frontier of Egypt as an independent formation. On 31 March 1916, the remaining Mounted Brigades were numbered in a single sequence. As a consequence, the 2nd South Midland Mounted Brigade was redesignated as 6th Mounted Brigade.

The brigade served with the Western Frontier Force from January to October 1916. It joined the newly formed Imperial Mounted Division in January 1917 and took part in the First and Second Battles of Gaza. The 17th Machine Gun Squadron was formed on 12 January 1917.

The complete brigade was transferred to the newly formed Yeomanry Mounted Division on 27 June 1917, joining it at el Maraqeb. From 31 October it took part in the Third Battle of Gaza, including the Battle of Beersheba and the Capture of the Sheria Position. It took part in the Battle of Mughar Ridge on 13 and 14 November and the Battle of Nebi Samwil from 17 to 24 November. From 27 to 29 November, it withstood the Turkish counter-attacks during the Capture of Jerusalem.

=== 10th Cavalry Brigade ===
10th Cavalry Brigade
Organisation, September 1918

- Queen's Own Dorset Yeomanry
- 2nd Lancers (Gardner's Horse)
- 38th King George's Own Central India Horse
- 17th Machine Gun Squadron
- 10th Cavalry Brigade Signal Troop
- 10th Combined Cavalry Field Ambulance, RAMC
- 10th Mobile Veterinary Section

In March 1918, the 1st Indian Cavalry Division was broken up in France. The British units (notably 6th (Inniskilling) Dragoons, 17th Lancers, 1/1st Queen's Own Yorkshire Dragoons and A, Q and U Batteries RHA) remained in France and the Indian elements were sent to Egypt.

By an Egyptian Expeditionary Force GHQ Order of 12 April 1918, the mounted troops of the EEF were reorganised when the Indian Army units arrived in theatre. On 24 April 1918, the Yeomanry Mounted Division was indianized (Note: British divisions were converted to the British Indian Army standard whereby brigades only retained one British regiment or battalion and most support units were Indian (artillery excepted).) and its title was changed to 1st Mounted Division, the third distinct division to bear this title. (Note: See 1st Mounted Division and 3rd Mounted Division.)

On 24 April 1918, the 6th Mounted Brigade was merged with elements of the 5th (Mhow) Cavalry Brigade:

- the Queen's Own Dorset Yeomanry remained with the brigade
- the Royal Buckinghamshire Hussars and the Berkshire Yeomanry left the brigade on 4 April and were merged to form C Battalion, Machine Gun Corps. It was posted to France, arriving on 28 June
- 2nd Lancers (Gardner's Horse) joined from 5th (Mhow) Cavalry Brigade
- 38th King George's Own Central India Horse joined from 5th (Mhow) Cavalry Brigade
- 17th Machine Gun Squadron remained with the brigade
- 6th Mounted Brigade Signal Troop remained with the brigade
- on 11 May, 2/South Midland Cavalry Field Ambulance merged with Mhow Cavalry Field Ambulance to form 6th Combined Cavalry Field Ambulance
- on 11 May, 4/1st North Midland Mobile Veterinary Section merged with Mhow Mobile Veterinary Section to form 6th Mobile Veterinary Section

On 22 July 1918, the 1st Mounted Division was renumbered as the 4th Cavalry Division and the brigade as 10th Cavalry Brigade. The sub units (Signal Troop, Combined Cavalry Field Ambulance and Mobile Veterinary Section) were renumbered on the same date.

The brigade remained with 4th Cavalry Division for the rest of the war, taking part in the Battle of Megiddo and the Capture of Damascus.

After the Armistice of Mudros, the brigade remained with 4th Cavalry Division in Palestine as part of the occupation forces. However, demobilization began immediately and by May 1919 most of the British units had been repatriated. The division was finally broken up in 1921.

== Commanders ==
The 2nd South Midland Mounted Brigade / 6th Mounted Brigade / 10th Cavalry Brigade had the following commanders:

From	Rank	Name
1 April 1912	Colonel	Earl of Longford (killed 21 August 1915)
5 August 1914	Brigadier-General	Earl of Longford (killed 21 August 1915)
23 August 1915	Colonel	C.A. Grenfell (acting, sick 26 August 1915)
26 August 1915	Lieutenant-Colonel	E.T. Troyte-Bullock (acting, until 4 September 1915) (Note: Brigade was absorbed in 1st Composite Mounted Brigade 4 September to 1 December 1915.)
1 December 1915	Brigadier-General	T.A. Wight-Boycott (died 30 March 1916)
by April 1916	Brigadier-General	the Viscount Hampden
17 July 1916	Brigadier-General	T.M.S. Pitt
28 September 1917	Lieutenant-Colonel	A.M. Pirie (acting)
1 October 1917	Lieutenant-Colonel	Sir R.L. Baker (acting)
12 October 1917	Brigadier-General	C.A.C Godwin, DSO, IA
7 November 1917	Lieutenant-Colonel	Hon. F.H. Cripps (acting)
9 November 1917	Brigadier-General	C.A.C. Godwin, DSO, IA
30 December 1917	Lieutenant-Colonel	Hon. F.H. Cripps (acting)
7 January 1918	Brigadier-General	C.A.C. Godwin, DSO, IA
31 March 1918	Lieutenant-Colonel	G.K.M. Mason (acting)
22 April 1918	Brigadier-General	C.A.C. Godwin, DSO, IA
17 July 1918	Brigadier-General	R.G.H. Howard-Vyse
21 September 1918	Brigadier-General	W.G.K. Green, DSO, IA

== See also ==
- 2/2nd South Midland Mounted Brigade for the 2nd Line formation
- 10th Indian Cavalry Brigade existed at the same time but was unrelated other than having the same number
- British yeomanry during the First World War

== Bibliography ==
- Becke, Archibald F. (1936). Order of Battle of Divisions Part 2A. The Territorial Force Mounted Divisions and the 1st-Line Territorial Force Divisions (42–56). London: HMSO. OCLC 4405016.
- James, Brigadier E.A. (1978). British Regiments 1914–18. London: Samson Books Limited. ISBN 0-906304-03-2.
- Perry, F.W. (1992). Order of Battle of Divisions Part 5A. The Divisions of Australia, Canada and New Zealand and those in East Africa. Newport: Ray Westlake Military Books. ISBN 1-871167-25-6.
- Perry, F.W. (1993). Order of Battle of Divisions Part 5B. Indian Army Divisions. Newport: Ray Westlake Military Books. ISBN 1-871167-23-X.
- Rinaldi, Richard A (2008). Order of Battle of the British Army 1914. Ravi Rikhye. ISBN 978-0-97760728-0.
- Westlake, Ray (1992). British Territorial Units 1914–18. Osprey Publishing. ISBN 978-1-85532-168-7.
- Westlake, Ray (1996). British Regiments at Gallipoli. Barnsley: Leo Cooper. ISBN 0-85052-511-X.
