= Guy Beatty =

Officer in the British Indian Army

Major-General Sir Guy Beatty KBE CB CSI CMG DSO*
- Born: Guy Archibald Hastings Beatty; 22 June 1870; Poona, British India
- Died: 22 May 1954 (aged 83); Budleigh Salterton, England
- Military career
- Allegiance: British Empire
- Branch: British Indian Army
- Service years: 1889–1931
- Rank: Major-General
- Units: Royal Irish Regiment; 9th Hodson's Horse
- Commands: 9th Hodson's Horse; 8th (Lucknow) Cavalry Brigade; 75th Brigade; 6th Brigade; 1st Indian Cavalry Brigade; 4th Indian Cavalry Brigade
- Conflicts: North-West Frontier; Boxer Rebellion; First World War; Third Afghan War
- Awards: Knight Commander Order of the British Empire; Companion of the Order of the Bath; Companion of the Order of the Star of India; Companion of the Order of St Michael and St George; Distinguished Service Order & Bar; Mentioned in Despatches (3)

Major-General Sir Guy Archibald Hastings Beatty KBE CB CSI CMG DSO & Bar (22 June 1870 – 22 May 1954) was an officer in the British Indian Army.

Beatty was born in 1870 at Poona, British India. He was first commissioned into the Royal Irish Regiment in 1889, but transferred to 9th Hodson's Horse, part of the British Indian Army, in 1892.

He fought in several wars and conflicts, including those on the North-West Frontier, in the Boxer Rebellion, in the First World War and in the Third Afghan War. During which he commanded his regiment and several brigades, rising in rank to major-general. He was also awarded several orders and was knighted for his service before retiring from the army in 1931.

== History ==
=== Early life ===
Guy Archibald Beatty, born 22 June 1870 at Poona in India, was the son of Surgeon-General Thomas Berkeley Beatty, of the Indian Medical Service and the brother of Brigadier-General Lionel Nicholson Beatty. He was educated at Newton College and Charterhouse School.

On 2 September 1887 he was commissioned as a second-lieutenant in the 3rd Battalion, Royal Irish Regiment. Then on 2 August 1892, he was seconded for service with the Indian Staff Corps, and later transferred to the British Indian Army in March 1894. Beatty first saw active service on the North-West Frontier in 1897. He was promoted to captain in February 1901, and mentioned in despatches, for service in the Boxer Rebellion in May that year. His next promotion was to major in 1908.

=== First World War ===
In November 1914, Beatty, and the 9th Hodson's Horse, which was part of the 8th (Lucknow) Cavalry Brigade, attached to the 1st Indian Cavalry Division, in the Indian Cavalry Corps, arrived in France. Beatty commanded the regiment and was promoted to lieutenant-colonel in March 1915. It was while still the regimental commander that he was awarded his first Distinguished Service Order (DSO). Then in December 1917 he was promoted to command the 8th (Lucknow) Cavalry Brigade, awarded a bar to his DSO, for a second award, and promoted to temporary brigadier-general in February 1918. In March 1918 the Indian Cavalry were withdrawn from the Western front and the 8th (Lucknow) Cavalry Brigade moved to Egypt, where it was reorganized and the units went on to Palestine where they saw service in General Allenby's final campaign.

=== Post-war ===
Following the Armistice with Turkey, Beatty was given command of British forces in north-east Persia and Transcapia. For post-war operations in the Balkans, Beatty was appointed a Companion of the Order of St Michael and St George in May 1919. In July 1920, while still holding the appointment of brigadier general he was promoted to brevet colonel. In the Third Afghan War he was in command of the 6th Indian Infantry Brigade and, on 17/18 September 1919, was involved in the destruction of Yar Muhammed's fort at Chora. Then when the rank of brigadier-general was abolished, in December 1920 he became a colonel commandant, while still in command of his brigade. He was again mentioned in despatches in January 1921, while commanding a British Indian Army brigade, co-operating with Russian and Turkish troops against the Turkestan Bolshevik Army. The following month he was promoted to substantive colonel, with seniority backdated to November 1919. He was given command of the Rawalpindi divisional area in India in 1920, soon after he took the 75th Indian Infantry Brigade to Iraq as re-inforcements to quell an insurrection, and was once more mentioned in despatches, defending the Persian lines of communications. He left Iraq in February 1921 and in March 1921 he was again promoted to temporary brigadier general,

=== Later army life ===
In September 1921, Beatty was appointed a Companion of the Order of the Star of India. In October 1921 he became temporary colonel commandant of 1st Indian Cavalry Brigade and at the end of the year in December was made a Companion of the Order of the Bath.

In April 1924, Beatty was appointed as an Aide de Camp to King George V. His final brigade command was as commander of the 4th Indian Cavalry Brigade in August 1925. That lasted until October 1925, when, with his tenure in command over, he was placed on the half pay list. The following year in November he was promoted to major general, and restored to full pay in August 1927. He then began a four-year tour as the Military Adviser-in-Chief, Indian State Forces. At the end of which he was knighted as a Knight Commander of the Order of the British Empire, just before retiring from the army on 20 June 1931. His final military appointment was as the Regimental Colonel for the 4th Duke of Cambridge's Own Hodson's Horse.

== Family life ==
Beatty married Mabel Reynolds in 1905 and they had a son and daughter, both of whom died on active service. Sir Guy Archibald Hastings Beatty died at his home in Budleigh Salterton, Devon in 1954 aged 83.
