= Herbert Holman =

British Indian Army general (1869–1949)

Lieutenant-General Sir Herbert Holman KCB CMG DSO
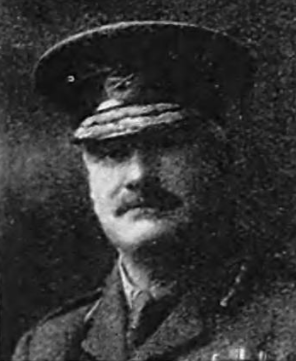

General Officer Commanding, Central Provinces District & 4th Indian Division
- In office November 1924 – November 1927

General Officer Commanding, Sind-Rajputana District, India
- In office December 1922 – November 1924

Deputy Quartermaster-General, GHQ India
- In office 1921 – December 1922

Chief of the British Military Mission to General Denikin
- In office May 1919 – April 1920

Personal details
- Born: Herbert Campbell Holman; 3 May 1869
- Died: 25 July 1949 (aged 80)

Lieutenant-General Sir Herbert Campbell Holman KCB CMG DSO (3 May 1869 − 25 July 1949) was a British officer of the Indian Army who served mostly in staff appointments.

== Early life and military career ==
The son of William Laban Holman, he was educated at Dulwich College and the Royal Military College, Sandhurst, and was commissioned into the Devonshire Regiment as a second lieutenant in 1889. He took part in the Wuntho expedition in Burma in 1891−1892, in which he was slightly wounded at Kyaingkwintaung and mentioned in despatches. Major-General Garnet Wolseley wrote of him:

Since the death of Captain Bray, Deputy Assistant Quartermaster-General, Intelligence Branch, the official diary of the campaign has been admirably carried on by Second-Lieutenant H. C. Holman, Devonshire Regiment. I have tried this gallant young officer in many duties, and for one so young I have never met one who so successfully achieved all that he was called upon to perform. I anticipate a brilliant career for this young officer, and I commend his good services to special notice."

He later served as a staff officer with the Irrawaddy column, for which he was mentioned in despatches again. In May 1892, now a lieutenant, he transferred to the Indian Army and joined the 16th Bengal Cavalry, which was renamed the 16th Bengal Lancers in 1901 the 16th Cavalry in 1903, the 13th/16th Cavalry in 1921 and the 6th Duke of Connaught's Own Lancers in 1922. In 1895, he qualified as a first-class interpreter in Russian and in 1897 he was sent to the Staff College, Camberley, graduating in 1898 and gaining his psc, by which time he had also qualified as a first-class interpreter in French. In 1899, he was appointed adjutant of the 16th Bengal Cavalry and in 1900 served as an interpreter with the Chinese Expeditionary Force sent to quell the Boxer Rebellion. He also acted as a special service officer and railway staff officer with the grade of deputy assistant adjutant-general (DAAG) and was mentioned in despatches for a third time in July 1901 and awarded the Distinguished Service Order (DSO) in November 1900.

Promoted captain in September 1900, Holman was assistant military secretary in the Military Department of the Government of India from May to August 1901 and in December 1902 was appointed staff captain in the Eastern Section of the Intelligence Branch of the War Office in London. He remained in this department until December 1906, being appointed deputy assistant quartermaster general (DAQMG) in January 1904. From June to November 1905, he was posted to Manchuria as a British observer with the Russian forces in the Russo-Japanese War, for which he was awarded the Order of St Stanislaus 2nd class with swords by Russia.

In 1906, Holman returned to regimental duties in India and was promoted major in September 1907. While on leave in Switzerland in 1907, he rescued a drowning man from the River Aare, for which was awarded the bronze medal of the Royal Humane Society. He then qualified as a first-class interpreter in German and served as a general staff officer 2nd grade (GSO2) at the Directorate of Operations at GHQ India from March to October 1910 and from July 1913. He was promoted to the brevet rank of lieutenant-colonel in June 1914.

== First World War ==
When the First World War broke out in August 1914, Holman went to France as an intelligence officer with the headquarters of the Indian Corps. In February 1915, he was appointed assistant quartermaster-general (AQMG) of the British First Army and was promoted to the substantive rank of lieutenant colonel. In November 1915, he was appointed deputy adjutant and quartermaster general of XI Corps with the temporary appointment of brigadier general and held this formal appointment until April 1919. He was promoted to brevet colonel in January 1916 and later to temporary major general while serving as head of administration of the Fourth Army. He was appointed Companion of the Order of St Michael and St George (CMG) in February 1915 and Companion of the Order of the Bath (CB) in January 1918. He was also mentioned in despatches nine more times, and awarded the Légion d'honneur and appointed commandeur of the Ordre du Mérite agricole by France.

== Post-war years ==
In January 1919, Holman was promoted to the substantive rank of major-general and in May 1919 he was appointed chief of the British Military Mission to General Denikin in South Russia during the Russian Civil War, a post which he held until April 1920, when he accompanied Denikin to Constantinople and thence to London as he went into exile. For these services, he was appointed Knight Commander of the Order of the Bath (KCB) on 11 November 1919. The White Russian government also awarded him the Order of St Anna 1st class with swords, the Order of St Stanislaus 1st class with swords and the Order of St Vladimir 4th class with swords.

In 1921, he returned to GHQ India as deputy quartermaster-general and in December 1922 he became general officer commanding (GOC) Sind-Rajputana District. In November 1924, he was transferred as GOC Central Provinces District and 4th Indian Division at Mhow. He was promoted lieutenant-general in November 1926, returned to Britain in November 1927 and retired in June 1928. He served as colonel of his regiment from March 1923 to 1945. From 1940 to 1944, he served as a private in the Home Guard.

Holman married Annie Ethel Talbot Howey (died 1948), daughter of fellow Indian Army officer Major-General William Howey, in 1902; they had a son and a daughter.
