= Kot Nainan =

Kot Nainan is a town and union council in Shakargarh Tehsil, Narowal District of Punjab, Pakistan. It is near Pakistan's border with India. It is 249 meters above sea level. The villages near Kot Nainan are Sultanpur, Chunan, Gunwal Jattan, Thariwal, Paswal, Sogian, Jagyal, Haryal, Kainth, Kotli Gujran, Bhagwanpur and Sujowal.
