= 4th Cavalry Division (India) =

1st Mounted Division 4th Cavalry Division
- Active: April 1918 – 1921
- Country: India
- Branch: British Indian Army
- Type: Cavalry
- Size: Division
- Engagements: World War I: Palestine 1918; Second Transjordan Raid; Battle of Megiddo; Capture of Damascus

Commanders
- Notable commanders: Major-General G. de S. Barrow

The 1st Mounted Division was a cavalry division that served as part of the Egyptian Expeditionary Force in Palestine in World War I. It was formed in April 1918 when the Yeomanry Mounted Division was merged with elements of the 1st Indian Cavalry Division withdrawn from the Western Front. In July 1918, the combined division was renamed as the 4th Cavalry Division. It remained in Palestine after the end of the war on occupation duties until finally broken up in 1921.

== History ==
=== 1st Mounted Division ===
In March 1918, the 1st Indian Cavalry Division was broken up in France. The British units (notably 6th (Inniskilling) Dragoons, 17th Lancers, 1/1st Queen's Own Yorkshire Dragoons and A, Q and U Batteries RHA) remained in France and the Indian elements were sent to Egypt.

By an Egyptian Expeditionary Force GHQ Order of 12 April 1918, the mounted troops of the EEF were reorganised when the Indian Army units arrived in theatre. On 24 April 1918, the Yeomanry Mounted Division was indianized (Note: British divisions were converted to the British Indian Army standard whereby brigades only retained one British regiment or battalion and most support units were Indian (artillery excepted).) and its title was changed to 1st Mounted Division, the third distinct division to bear this title. (Note: See 1st Mounted Division and 3rd Mounted Division.)

On 24 April 1918, the 6th Mounted Brigade was merged with elements of the 5th (Mhow) Cavalry Brigade, the 8th Mounted Brigade with the 8th (Lucknow) Cavalry Brigade, and the 22nd Mounted Brigade with the 2nd (Sialkot) Cavalry Brigade. Six of the Yeomanry Regiments were merged in pairs, converted to Machine Gun Battalions, and posted to the Western Front:

- C Battalion, Machine Gun Corps was formed by the merger of the 1/1st Royal Buckinghamshire Hussars and the 1/1st Berkshire Yeomanry
- D Battalion, Machine Gun Corps was formed by the merger of the 1/1st Lincolnshire Yeomanry and the 1/1st East Riding of Yorkshire Yeomanry
- E Battalion, Machine Gun Corps was formed by the merger of the 1/1st City of London Yeomanry (Rough Riders) and the 1/3rd County of London Yeomanry (Sharpshooters)

They were replaced by Indian Cavalry Regiments from France. The Field Ambulances and Mobile Veterinary Sections merged with their Indian counterparts. Other units were retained unchanged, though some were renumbered to reflect the new divisional designation.

=== 4th Cavalry Division ===
On 22 July 1918, the 1st Mounted Division was renumbered as the 4th Cavalry Division and the brigades as the 10th, 11th and 12th Cavalry Brigades. The sub units (Signal Troops, Combined Cavalry Field Ambulances and Mobile Veterinary Sections) were renumbered on the same date.

Order of Battle, September 1918
10th Cavalry Brigade 1/1st Queen's Own Dorset Yeomanry; 2nd Lancers (Gardner's Horse); 38th King George's Own Central India Horse; 17th Machine Gun Squadron; 10th Cavalry Brigade Signal Troop; 10th Combined Cavalry Field Ambulance, RAMC; 10th Mobile Veterinary Section	11th Cavalry Brigade 1/1st County of London Yeomanry; 29th Lancers (Deccan Horse); 36th Jacob's Horse; 21st Machine Gun Squadron; 11th Cavalry Brigade Signal Troop; 11th Combined Cavalry Field Ambulance, RAMC; 11th Mobile Veterinary Section	12th Cavalry Brigade 1/1st Staffordshire Yeomanry; 6th King Edward's Own Cavalry; 19th Lancers (Fane's Horse); 18th Machine Gun Squadron; 12th Cavalry Brigade Signal Troop; 12th Combined Cavalry Field Ambulance, RAMC; 12th Mobile Veterinary Section
XX Brigade, Royal Horse Artillery (T.F.) Hampshire RHA; Berkshire RHA; Leicestershire RHA; XX RHA Brigade Ammunition Column	Divisional Troops 4th Field Squadron, RE; 4th Cavalry Division Signal Squadron	4th Cavalry Division Train 999th Company ASC; 1000th Company ASC; 1001st Company ASC; 1002nd Company ASC

=== Battles ===
The 1st Mounted / 4th Cavalry Division served with the Desert Mounted Corps for the rest of the war, taking part in the Second Transjordan Raid (30 April to 4 May 1918) and the Final Offensive, in particular the Battle of Megiddo (19 to 25 September) and the Capture of Damascus (1 October).

After the Armistice of Mudros, the division remained in Palestine on occupation duties after the end of the war. However, demobilization began immediately and most of the British war time units had left by May 1919, though the 1/1st County of London Yeomanry did not leave until March 1920. The division was finally broken up in 1921.

== See also ==
- 5th Cavalry Division (British Indian Army) formed at the same time in a similar manner.
- List of Indian divisions in World War I

== Bibliography ==
- Becke, Archibald F. (1936). Order of Battle of Divisions Part 2A. The Territorial Force Mounted Divisions and the 1st-Line Territorial Force Divisions (42–56). London: HMSO. OCLC 4405016.
- Perry, F.W. (1993). Order of Battle of Divisions Part 5B. Indian Army Divisions. Newport: Ray Westlake Military Books. ISBN 1-871167-23-X.
