= Frontier Force =

Frontier Force usually means any of a Paramilitary type border security or border guard, it can mean any of the following:

- Frontier Force Regiment (popularly known as the "Piffers" or the "FF"), one of six Infantry regiments in the Pakistan Army
- 5 Gorkha Rifles (Frontier Force), part of the British Indian Army (subsequently part of the Indian Army)
- 10th Queen Victoria's Own Corps Of Guides Cavalry (Frontier Force), part of the British Indian Army
- 11th Prince Albert Victor's Own Cavalry (Frontier Force), part of the British Indian Army.
- 12th Cavalry (Frontier Force), part of the British Indian Army.
- 12th Frontier Force Regiment, part of the British Indian Army
- 13th Frontier Force Rifles, part of the British Indian Army, formed in 1922 by amalgamation of five existing regiments
- Royal West African Frontier Force, a multi-battalion field force, formed by the British Colonial Office in 1900
- Special Frontier Force, a paramilitary unit of India
- Transjordan Frontier Force
- Liberian Frontier Force (LFF), which later became the Armed Forces of Liberia

== See also ==
- Frontier Corps, Pakistan
