= 36th Jacob's Horse =

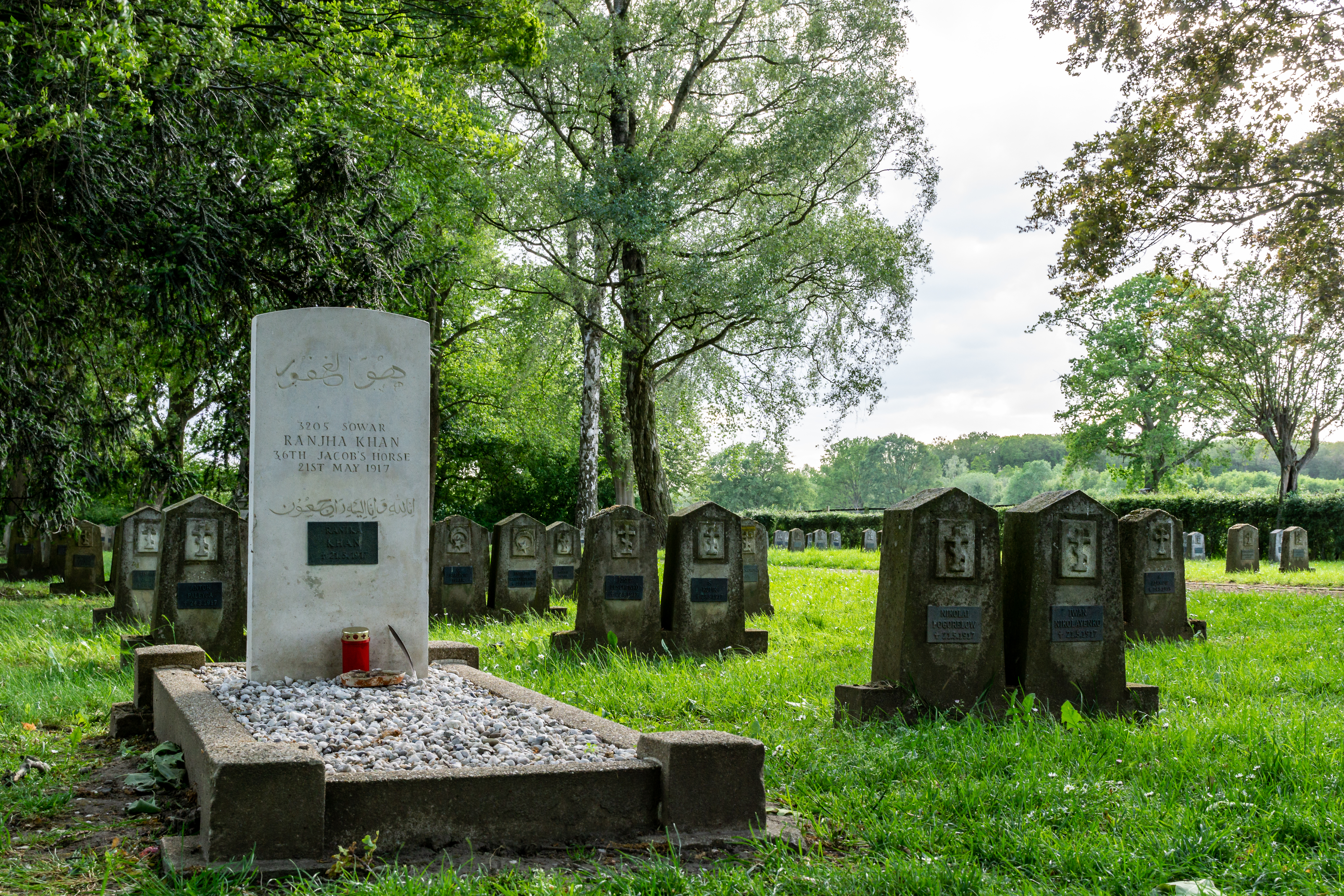
Grave of Ranjha Khan of the 36 th Jacob's Horse, died May 21, 1917, buried at the War Cemetery Haus Spital, Münster, Germany. Haus Spital was a POW-camp for nearly 50,000 Allied Prisoners of War.

The 36th Jacob's Horse were a unit of cavalry of the British Indian Army.

== Origins ==
They were raised by Lieut. John Jacob of the Bombay Artillery, as a unit of Irregular Horse, originally in 1839 (reformed 1846) to patrol the area of 'Scinde' (now Sindh province of Pakistan) and its restive frontier with Balochistan. They then served in guarding the marches of Southern Afghanistan during the First Anglo-Afghan War and later under Sir Charles Napier in the annexation of Scinde/Sindh.

Like all regiments of the Indian Army, the 36th Jacob's Horse underwent many name changes in the various reorganisations. They are listed below.

== History ==
- 1839/1846 2nd Regiment of Scinde Irregular Horse
- 1860 2nd Regiment of Scinde Horse
- 1861 9th Regiment of Scinde Silladar Cavalry
- 1861 2nd Regiment of Scinde Horse
- 1885 6th Bombay Cavalry (Jacob-Ka-Rissallah)
- 1888 6th Bombay Cavalry (Jacob's Horse)
- 1903 Jacob's Horse
- In 1922 the 36th Jacob's Horse was amalgamated with the 35th Scinde Horse as the 14th Prince of Wales's Own Scinde Horse.

== Honours of Battle ==
The 2nd Scinde Horse, or Jacob's Horse (14th Prince of Wales's Own Scinde Horse) had the following principal battle honours, as a regiment of British Indian cavalry, until the Independence and Partition of India and Pakistan in 1947:

Meeanee, Hyderabad, Cuthchee (Scinde/Sindh campaigns); Mooltan, Goojerat, Punjaub (Punjab, Anglo-Sikh Wars); Central India; Afghanistan 1878-80; Morvai, Cambrai 1917, France and Flanders 1914–18, Megiddo, Sharon, Damascus, Palestine 1918; North West Frontier, India 1914–15, 1918. They did not receive any battle honours of the Second World War.
