= 8th (Lucknow) Cavalry Brigade =

Lucknow Cavalry Brigade 8th (Lucknow) Cavalry Brigade 4th Indian Cavalry Brigade
- Active: October 1911 – March 1918; April 1920 – 1923
- Country: British India
- Allegiance: British Crown
- Branch: British Indian Army
- Type: Cavalry
- Size: Brigade
- Part of: 8th (Lucknow) Division; 1st Indian Cavalry Division
- Peacetime HQ: Lucknow
- Engagements: First World War Western Front Battle of Cambrai (1917)

Commanders
- Notable commanders: Br.-Gen. G.A.H. Beatty

The Lucknow Cavalry Brigade was a cavalry brigade of the British Indian Army formed in 1911 as a result of the Kitchener Reforms. It was mobilized as 8th (Lucknow) Cavalry Brigade at the outbreak of the First World War as part of the 1st Indian Cavalry Division and departed for France. It served on the Western Front with the division until it was broken up in March 1918.

The brigade was reformed in April 1920 and broken up in 1923.

== History ==
The Kitchener Reforms, carried out during Lord Kitchener's tenure as Commander-in-Chief, India (1902–1909), completed the unification of the three former Presidency armies, the Punjab Frontier Force, the Hyderabad Contingent and other local forces into one Indian Army. Kitchener identified the Indian Army's main task as the defence of the North-West Frontier against foreign aggression (particularly Russian expansion into Afghanistan) with internal security relegated to a secondary role. The Army was organized into divisions and brigades that would act as field formations but also included internal security troops.

The Lucknow Cavalry Brigade was formed in October 1911 (Note: 16 October 1911 was the appointment date of the brigade's first commanding officer.) as a result of the Kitchener Reforms. The brigade was one of the last to be formed before the outbreak of the First World War. It formed part of the 8th (Lucknow) Division in peacetime.

8th (Lucknow) Cavalry Brigade

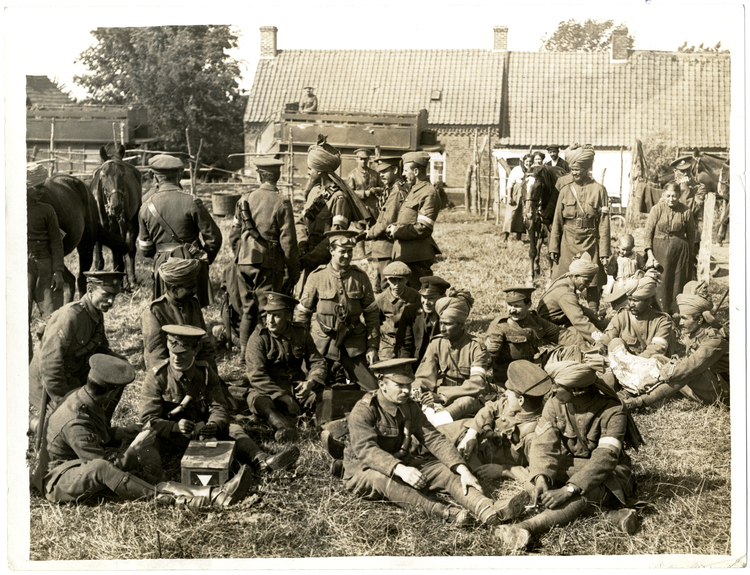
English and Indian soldiers of the Signal Troop of the Lucknow Cavalry Brigade relaxing in a farmyard at Brigade Headquarters, 28 July 1915

In September 1914, the brigade was mobilized as the 8th (Lucknow) Cavalry Brigade and assigned to the 1st Indian Cavalry Division. With the division, it departed Bombay on 16 October 1914 and landed at Marseille on 7 November. However, the brigade did not reach the Front until 8–10 December due to horse sickness. While in France, the brigade was known by its geographical rather than numerical designation so as to avoid confusion with the British 8th Cavalry Brigade also serving on the Western Front at the same time.

Other than the Battle of Cambrai when it helped to hold the German counter-attack, it was not involved in battle. Instead, it was held in reserve in case of a breakthrough, although it did send parties to the trenches on a number of occasions. They would hold the line, or act as Pioneers; such parties were designated as the Lucknow Battalion.

Dissolved

In March 1918, the brigade was broken up in France. The British units (1/1st Queen's Own Yorkshire Dragoons and U Battery, RHA) remained in France, 12th Machine Gun Squadron was broken up on 14 April 1918 and the Indian elements were sent to Egypt. On 24 April 1918, these were merged with the 8th Mounted Brigade of the Yeomanry Mounted Division. On 22 July 1918 the 8th Mounted Brigade was redesignated as 11th Cavalry Brigade and the division as 4th Cavalry Division.

Post war

The Lucknow Cavalry Brigade was reformed in April 1920. In September 1920 it was designated as the 4th Indian Cavalry Brigade until 1923 when it was broken up.

== Orders of battle ==
In India in August 1914
At the outbreak of the First World War, the brigade had the following composition:
- 1st King's Dragoon Guards
- 12th Cavalry (transferred to Fyzabad in September 1914)
- 16th Cavalry (remained at Lucknow in September 1914)
- 17th Cavalry (transferred to Allahabad in September 1914)
- 36th Jacob's Horse

Western Front
The brigade's composition on the Western Front included:
- 1st King's Dragoon Guards (left on 7 October 1917 for India, arriving in November and joined 4th (Meerut) Cavalry Brigade)
- 1/1st Queen's Own Yorkshire Dragoons (joined on 6 December 1917 from Cavalry Corps Troops) (Note: 1/1st Queen's Own Yorkshire Dragoons was previously II Corps Cavalry Regiment. On 16 March 1918, it rejoined II Corps as a cyclist unit.)
- 29th Lancers (Deccan Horse) (joined in September 1914 from Poona, 6th (Poona) Division)
- 36th Jacob's Horse
- U Battery, Royal Horse Artillery (joined in September 1914 from XI Brigade, Royal Horse Artillery at Lucknow) (Note: U Battery, Royal Horse Artillery was assigned to I Indian Brigade, Royal Horse Artillery but in practice was permanently attached to the brigade.)
- Lucknow Cavalry Field Ambulance (sailed from India with the brigade; joined 1st Indian Cavalry Division in December 1914)
- Lucknow Mobile Veterinary Section (sailed from India with the brigade; joined 2nd Indian Cavalry Division in December 1914)
- Lucknow Signal Troop
- 12th Machine Gun Squadron (from 29 February 1916) (Note: Formed of the machine gun sections of 29th Lancers (Deccan Horse) and 36th Jacob's Horse.)

== Commanders ==
The Lucknow Cavalry Brigade / 8th (Lucknow) Cavalry Brigade had the following commanders:

From	Rank	Name	Notes
16 October 1911	Major-General	G.A. Cookson	
26 November 1914	Brigadier-General	W.H. Fasken	
13 May 1916	Brigadier-General	M.F. Gage	
13 December 1917	Brigadier-General	G.A.H. Beatty	Brigade broken up in March 1918

The new Lucknow Cavalry Brigade / 4th Indian Cavalry Brigade was commanded throughout it existence (April 1920 – 1923) by Major-General L.C. Jones.

== See also ==
- 22nd (Lucknow) Brigade
- Indian Cavalry Corps order of battle First World War
- Indian Expeditionary Force A

== Bibliography ==
- Haythornthwaite, Philip J. (1996). The World War One Source Book. London: Arms and Armour Press. ISBN 1-85409-351-7.
- Becke, Archibald F. (1936). Order of Battle of Divisions Part 2A. The Territorial Force Mounted Divisions and the 1st-Line Territorial Force Divisions (42–56). London: HMSO. OCLC 4405016.
- James, Brigadier E.A. (1978). British Regiments 1914–18. London: Samson Books Limited. ISBN 0-906304-03-2.
- Mackie, Colin (June 2015). "Army Commands 1900-2011" (PDF). gulabin.com. Archived from the original (PDF) on 5 July 2015.
- Perry, F.W. (1993). Order of Battle of Divisions Part 5B. Indian Army Divisions. Newport: Ray Westlake Military Books. ISBN 1-871167-23-X.
