= 1st Indian Cavalry Division =

Division of the British Indian Army

- Active: September 1914 – March 1918
- Country: British India
- Allegiance: British Crown
- Branch: British Indian Army
- Type: Cavalry
- Size: Division
- Part of: Indian Cavalry Corps
- Engagements: Western Front in World War I Battle of Cambrai

Commanders
- Notable commanders: Henry Peregrine Leader; Michael Rimington

The 1st Indian Cavalry Division was a division of the British Indian Army which was formed at the outbreak of the First World War. It served on the Western Front, and was renamed the 4th Cavalry Division on 26 November 1916. In March 1918, the 4th Cavalry Division was disbanded; the British units remained in France and the Indian units were sent to Egypt to help form the 1st Mounted Division.

== History ==
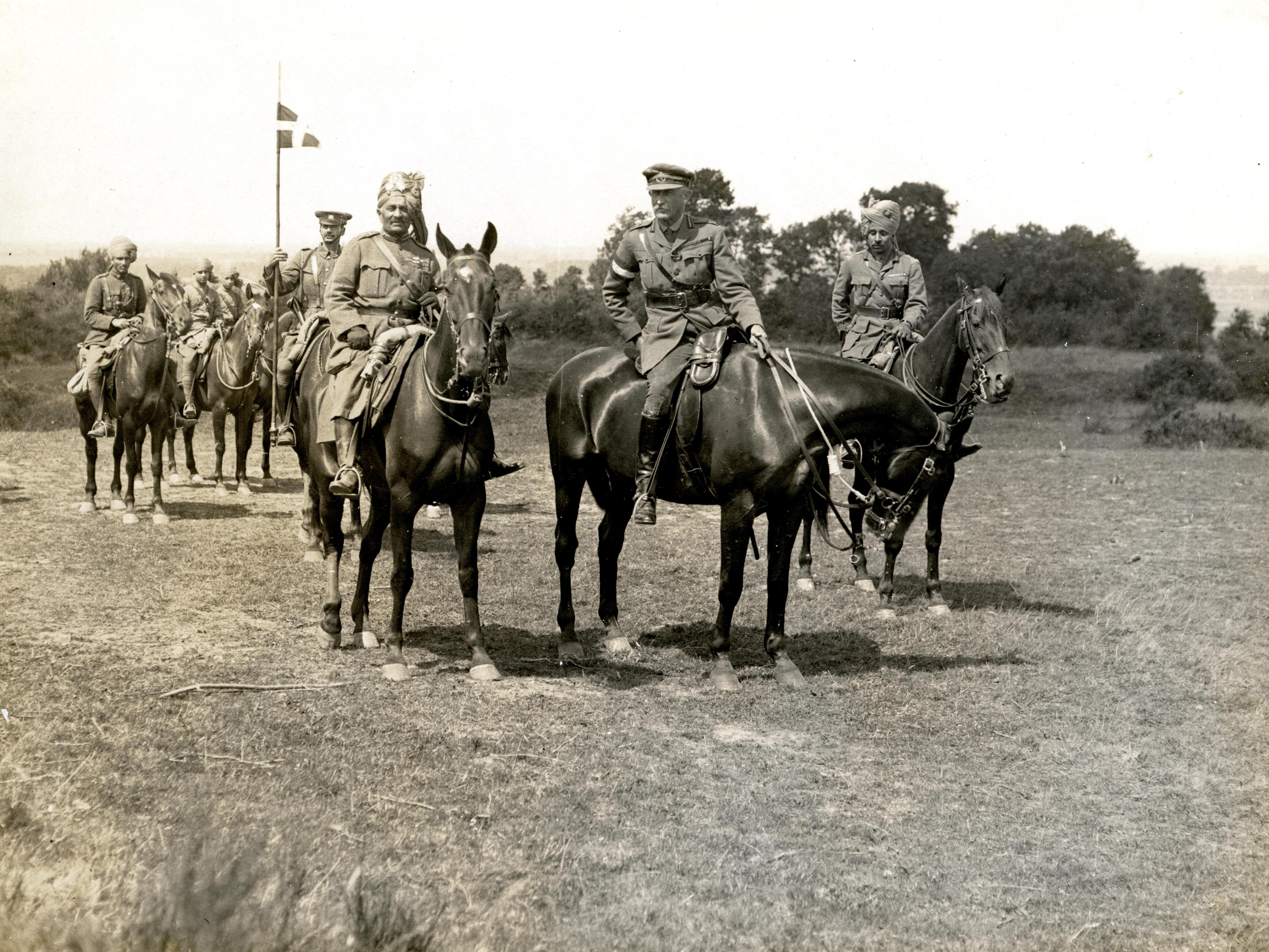
Michael Rimington riding alongside Pratap Singh and Sajjan Singh in Linghem, 28 July 1915.

The division sailed for France from Bombay, India, on 16 October 1914, over two months after the British entry into World War I, under the command of Major General Hew Fanshawe. The division was re-named the 4th Cavalry Division in November 1916.

During the war, the division served in the trenches of the Western Front as infantrymen. A large number of early officer casualties affected the division's later performance. British officers who understood the language, customs and psychology of their men could not be quickly replaced and the alien environment of the Western Front affected the soldiers.

The division served in France and Belgium, the main theatre of war, and was held in reserve for the expected breakthrough. It provided dismounted parties for trench duty and in November 1917 fought as a division in the Battle of Cambrai during the German counter-stroke of 30 November–3 December.

In March 1918, the division was broken up and the Indian regiments were combined in Egypt with the Yeomanry Mounted Division to form the 1st Mounted Division (later the 4th Cavalry Division).

== Order of battle ==
- 2nd (Sialkot) Cavalry Brigade:
  - 17th Lancers
  - 6th King Edward's Own Cavalry
  - 19th Lancers
  - Q Battery, Royal Horse Artillery
  - 10th Machine Gun Squadron (joined after February 1916)
- 3rd (Ambala) Cavalry Brigade (left on 15 September 1915 for the 2nd Indian Cavalry Division):
  - 8th (King's Royal Irish) Hussars
  - 9th Hodson's Horse
  - 30th Lancers (Gordon's Horse)
  - A Battery, Royal Horse Artillery

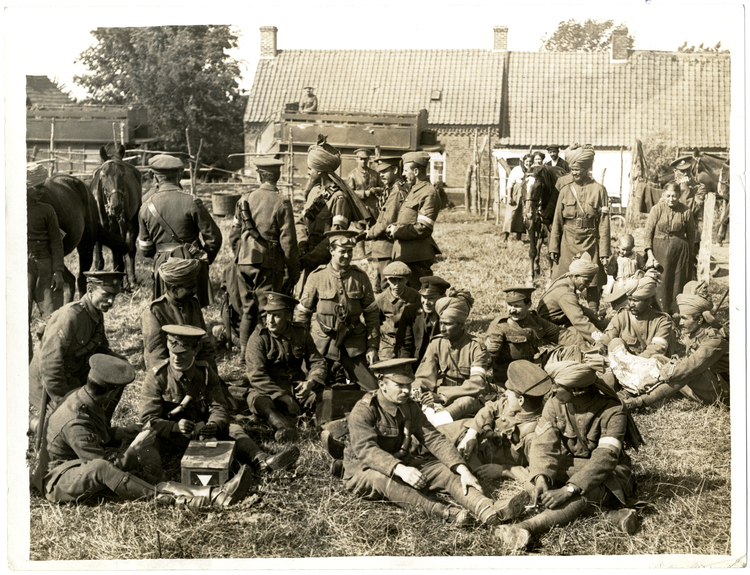
English and Indian soldiers of the Lucknow Cavalry Brigade's Signal Troop relaxing in a farmyard at brigade headquarters, 28 July 1915

- 8th (Lucknow) Cavalry Brigade:
  - 1st King's Dragoon Guards (left on 7 October 1917)
  - Queen's Own Yorkshire Dragoons (joined on 6 December 1917)
  - 29th Lancers (Deccan Horse)
  - 36th Jacob's Horse
  - U Battery, Royal Horse Artillery
  - 12th Machine Gun Squadron (from 29 February 1916)
- 5th (Mhow) Cavalry Brigade (joined on 15 September 1915 from the 2nd Indian Cavalry Division):
  - 6th (Inniskilling) Dragoons
  - 2nd Lancers (Gardner's Horse)
  - Central India Horse
  - A Battery, Royal Horse Artillery
- XVI Brigade, Royal Horse Artillery (from 26 November 1916):
  - A Battery, Royal Horse Artillery (with the 3rd (Ambala) Cavalry Brigade, then the 5th (Mhow) Cavalry Brigade)
  - Q Battery, Royal Horse Artillery (with the 2nd [Sialkot] Cavalry Brigade)
  - U Battery, Royal Horse Artillery (with the 8th [Lucknow] Cavalry Brigade)
  - I Indian RHA Brigade Ammunition Column

== See also ==
- British cavalry during the First World War
- List of Indian divisions in World War I

== Bibliography ==
- Haythornthwaite, Philip J. (1996). The World War One Source Book. London: Arms and Armour Press. ISBN 1-85409-351-7.
- Perry, F.W. (1993). Order of Battle of Divisions Part 5B. Indian Army Divisions. Newport: Ray Westlake Military Books. ISBN 1-871167-23-X.
