= 3rd Cavalry Brigade (United Kingdom) =

- Active: 1815; 1899–1902; 1914–
- Country: United Kingdom
- Branch: British Army
- Type: Cavalry
- Size: Brigade
- Part of: 2nd Cavalry Division (World War I)
- Engagements: Napoleonic Wars Battle of Waterloo Second Boer War Battle of Paardeberg World War I Western Front

Commanders
- Notable commanders: Wilhelm von Dörnberg; Hubert Gough

The 3rd Cavalry Brigade was a cavalry brigade of the British Army. It served in the Napoleonic Wars (notably at the Battle of Waterloo), in the Boer War, and in the First World War on the Western Front where it was initially assigned to The Cavalry Division before spending most of the war with the 2nd Cavalry Division.

== History ==
=== Napoleonic Wars ===
From June 1809, Wellington organized his cavalry into one, later two, cavalry divisions (1st and 2nd) for the Peninsular War. These performed a purely administrative, rather than tactical, role; the normal tactical headquarters were provided by brigades commanding two, later usually three, regiments. The cavalry brigades were named for the commanding officer, rather than numbered. (Note: This could be a source of confusion as brigades acquired new commanders, or they moved between brigades. For example, Fane's Brigade became De Grey's Brigade from 13 May 1810 when Henry Fane went to Estremadura; De Grey's Brigade was broken up 29 January 1812. On 20 May 1813, Fane took over Slade's Brigade; the second Fane's Brigade was unrelated to the original one although coincidentally, and to add to the potential confusion, the 3rd Dragoon Guards served in both.) For the Hundred Days Campaign, he numbered his British cavalry brigades in a single sequence, 1st to 7th. (Note: The British cavalry included five regiments of the King's German Legion.) The 3rd Cavalry Brigade consisted of:

- 1st Light Dragoons, King's German Legion
- 2nd Light Dragoons, King's German Legion
- 23rd Light Dragoons

It was commanded by Major General Sir Wilhelm von Dörnberg.

The brigade took part in the Battle of Waterloo. During the battle, the 1st Light Dragoons, KGL suffered 154 casualties (33 killed, 111 wounded, 10 missing), the 2nd Light Dragoons, KGL 77 (20 killed, 55 wounded, 2 missing) and the 23rd Light Dragoons 74 (14 killed, 28 wounded, 32 missing). This represented a loss rate of about 22%. (Note: 1st Light Dragoons, KGL had a strength of 540, 2nd Light Dragoons, KGL 520, and 23rd Light Dragoons 341.)

=== Boer War ===
The brigade was reformed for the Boer War. During the Battle of Paardeberg, the brigade commanded:

9th (Queen’s Royal) Lancers
16th (Queen’s) Lancers
O and R Batteries, Royal Horse Artillery

=== World War I ===
==== Mobilization ====
3rd Cavalry Brigade was a peacetime formation of the British Army, based in Irish Command. At the outbreak of the war, it was headquartered at The Curragh and commanded the 4th (Queen’s Own) Hussars (at The Curragh), 5th (Royal Irish) Lancers (at Dublin), 16th (Queen’s) Lancers (The Curragh), and 3rd Signal Troop, Royal Engineers (also at The Curragh). A number of units were attached to the brigade: the Newbridge-based III Brigade, RHA (D and E Batteries), 4th Field Troop, Royal Engineers (The Curragh) and the South Irish Horse of the Special Reserve (based in Dublin).

On mobilization, 3rd Cavalry Brigade Field Ambulance joined and the attached units departed. (Note: III Brigade, RHA was assigned to The Cavalry Division, 4th Field Troop, Royal Engineers was assigned to the independent 5th Cavalry Brigade and the South Irish Horse was split up, initially providing a squadron to a composite Irish Horse Regiment (with two squadrons of the North Irish Horse) to serve with GHQ (General Headquarters) of the BEF.) The brigade joined The Cavalry Division along with 1st, 2nd and 4th Cavalry Brigades and moved to France in August 1914.

==== Early Actions ====
With The Cavalry Division, the brigade took part in a number of actions during the early war of movement, notably the Battle of Mons (23–24 August) and the Battle of Le Cateau (26 August). On 6 September, it joined the formerly independent 5th Cavalry Brigade in Gough's Command (under 3rd Cavalry Brigade's Br-Gen Hubert Gough). As part of Gough's Command, it took part in the First Battle of the Aisne (12–15 September). On 13 September, Gough's Command was redesignated as 2nd Cavalry Division with the addition of divisional troops (RHA, RE, etc.). It remained with 2nd Cavalry Division on the Western Front until the end of the war.

==== 2nd Cavalry Division ====
In 1914, the brigade, with the division, took part in First Battle of Ypres, notably the battle of Gheluvelt (29–31 October). In 1915, the division was in action at the Battle of Neuve Chapelle (10–12 March 1915) and the Second Battle of Ypres notable the Battle of St Julien (26 April–3 May) and the Battle of Bellewaarde Ridge (24–25 May).

On 29 February 1916, a Machine Gun Squadron was formed from the machine gun sections of the brigade's constituent regiments.

1916 saw no notable actions, but in 1917 the division saw action in the Battle of Arras (First Battle of the Scarpe, 9–11 April). and the Battle of Cambrai (the Tank Attack of 20–21 November, the Capture of Bourlon Wood of 24–28 November and the German Counter-Attack of 30 November–3 December). At other times, the brigade formed a dismounted unit and served in the trenches as a regiment under the command of the brigadier.

==== War of movement ====
1918 saw the return of the war of movement and the division took part in the First Battle of the Somme notably the Battle of St Quentin (21–23 March), the Battle of the Lys (Battle of Hazebrouck of 14–15 April), the Battle of Amiens (8–11 August) and the Second Battle of the Somme (Battle of Albert of 21–23 August and the Second Battle of Bapaume of 31 August–3 September).

The division was then split up with the 3rd Cavalry Brigade serving initially with Third Army. The brigade took part in the battles of the Hindenburg Line, notably the Battle of the Canal du Nord (27 September–1 October) and the Pursuit to the Selle (9–12 October, now with First Army). Its final action was to take part in the Advance in Picardy (17 October–11 November) including the capture of Mons (11 November, 3rd Canadian Division with 5th (Royal Irish) Lancers and one section (Note: A Subsection consisted of a single gun and limber drawn by six horses (with three drivers), eight gunners (riding on the limber or mounted on their own horses), and an ammunition wagon also drawn by six horses (with three drivers). Two Subsections formed a Section and in a six gun battery these would be designated as Left, Centre and Right Sections.) of D Battery, RHA), still with First Army.

==== Armistice ====
At the Armistice, the brigade had reached Havré and St. Denis with First Army. On 15 November, the division was re-assembled near Maubeuge and ordered to advance into Germany as an advance screen for Fourth Army and form part of the Occupation Force. The move began on 17 November, Ciney and Rochefort were reached five days later.

In late December, the division moved to winter quarters south and south-east of Liège. It remained here until 30 January 1919 when it exchanged regiments with 1st and 3rd Cavalry Divisions then gradually moved back to England. The Division ceased to exist at midnight 31 March / 1 April 1919.

==== Units in WWI ====
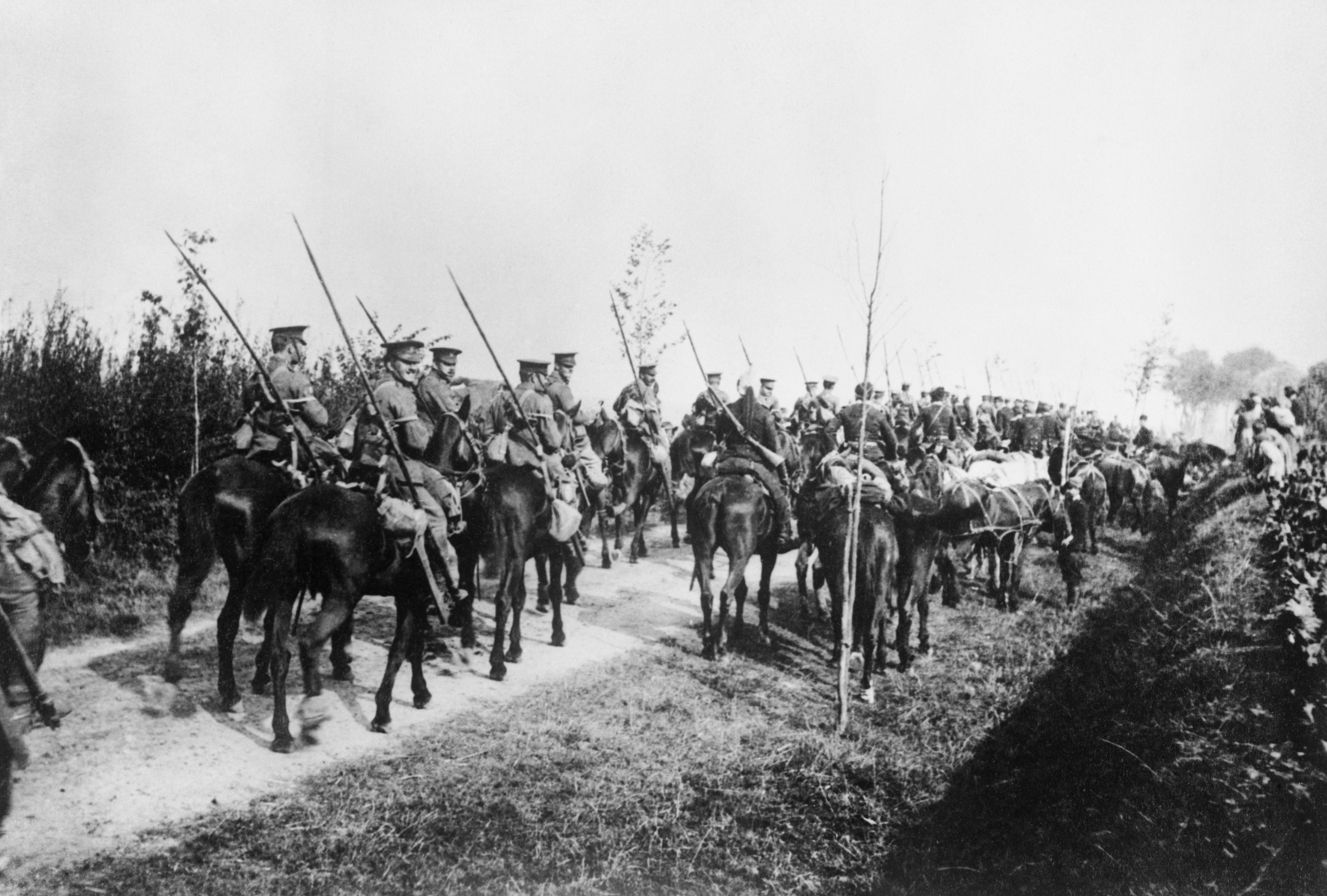
The Retreat from Mons: 16th Lancers on the march, September 1914.

Unit	From	To
4th (Queen’s Own) Hussars	Mobilization	
5th (Royal Irish) Lancers	Mobilization	
16th (Queen’s) Lancers	Mobilization	
1/1st Leicestershire Yeomanry	4 April 1918 (Note: 1/1st Leicestershire Yeomanry was originally with 8th Cavalry Brigade, 3rd Cavalry Division. It left the brigade on 14 March 1918 to become a cyclist unit, then to form a machine gun battalion with the 1/1st North Somerset Yeomanry. The German spring offensive forestalled this plan and the regiment was remounted and sent to the 2nd Cavalry Division. From 4 April it was split up with a squadron joining each regiment in 3rd Cavalry Brigade.)	
D Battery, RHA	17 September 1914 (Note: D Battery, RHA was permanently attached to 3rd Cavalry Brigade from the Division's III Brigade, RHA.)	
3rd Signal Troop, Royal Engineers	Mobilization	
3rd Cavalry Brigade Field Ambulance	Mobilization	13 September 1914 (Note: 3rd Cavalry Brigade Field Ambulance remained with 1st Cavalry Division when the brigade transferred to 2nd Cavalry Division. 2nd Cavalry Brigade Field Ambulance transferred with the Brigade and joined 2nd Cavalry Division.)
3rd Cavalry Brigade Machine Gun Squadron, MGC	29 February 1916	

== Commanders ==
The 3rd Cavalry Brigade had the following commanders during World War I:

From	Rank	Name
Mobilization	Brigadier-General	H. de la P. Gough
16 September 1914	Brigadier-General	J. Vaughan
16 October 1915	Brigadier-General	J.A. Bell-Smyth

== See also ==
- Order of battle of the Waterloo Campaign
- British Army during World War I
- British Cavalry Corps order of battle 1914
- British cavalry during the First World War

== Bibliography ==
- Becke, Archibald F. (1935). Order of Battle of Divisions Part 1–The Regular British Divisions. London: HMSO. OCLC 4405016.
- Clarke, W.G. (1993). Horse Gunners: The Royal Horse Artillery, 200 Years of Panache and Professionalism. Woolwich: The Royal Artillery Institution. ISBN 09520762-0-9.
- Haythornthwaite, Philip J. (1990). The Napoleonic Source Book. London: Guild Publishing.
- James, Brigadier E.A. (1978). British Regiments 1914–18. London: Samson Books Limited. ISBN 0-906304-03-2.
- Reid, Stuart (2004). Wellington's Army in the Peninsula 1809–14. Vol. 2 of Battle Orders Series. Oxford: Osprey Publishing. ISBN 1-84176-517-1.
- Smith, Digby (1998). The Greenhill Napoleonic Wars Data Book. London: Greenhill Books. ISBN 1-85367-276-9.
