= John Vaughan (British Army officer, born 1871) =

Cavalry officer in the British Army

Major-General John Vaughan CB DSO DL JP
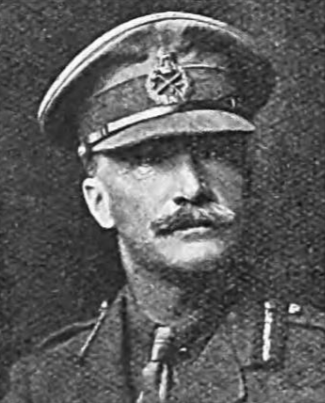
- Born: 31 July 1871; Dolgellau, Merionethshire, Wales
- Died: 21 January 1956 (aged 84); Dolgellau, Merionethshire, Wales
- Military career
- Allegiance: United Kingdom
- Branch: British Army
- Service years: 1891–1920
- Rank: Major-General
- Nickname: J.V.
- Units: 7th (Queen's Own) Hussars; 10th (The Prince of Wales's Own) Royal Hussars
- Commands: 10th (The Prince of Wales's Own) Royal Hussars; Cavalry School, Netheravon; 3rd Cavalry Brigade; 3rd Cavalry Division; Zone Commander, Home Guard
- Conflicts: Matabele War 1896; Mashonaland War 1897; Mahdist War 1898; Second Boer War 1899–1902; First World War 1914–1918; Second World War 1939–1945
- Awards: Order of the Bath; Distinguished Service Order and Bar; Légion d'honneur
- Other work: Welsh President British Legion; Deputy lieutenant Justice of the peace

Major-General John Vaughan, CB, DSO, DL, JP (31 July 1871 –21 January 1956) was a cavalry officer in the 7th (Queen's Own) Hussars and the 10th (The Prince of Wales's Own) Royal Hussars of the British Army.

He fought in several conflicts on the African continent. During the First World War he commanded the 3rd Cavalry Brigade and then the 3rd Cavalry Division, for which he was awarded an Order of the Bath, and a Bar for the Distinguished Service Order, the first of which he had received in South Africa.

Post war he became the Welsh President of the British Legion, a Deputy Lieutenant for Merionethshire and a Justice of the Peace. During the Second World War he returned to the army as a Zone Commander in the Home Guard.

== Early life ==
John Vaughan was born 31 July 1871, at Nannau, Dolgellau, Merionethshire in Wales. He was the second son of John and Elinor Anne Vaughan, of a family that could trace their roots back to a line of Welsh princes in the Middle Ages. He was educated at Eton College before attending the Royal Military College, Sandhurst.

== Early military career ==
=== 7th (Queen's Own) Hussars ===
Vaughan was later to write "my military career was mapped out for me when I was still in the cradle". It all began when he graduated from Sandhurst in March 1891 and joined the 7th (Queen's Own) Hussars, with the rank of second-lieutenant. His promotion to lieutenant came on 4 September 1894, before seeing his first active service, in South Africa, during the 1896 Matabele relief expedition. The following year he participated in the Mashonaland War and the Sudan campaign in 1898. He was then promoted to captain on 9 October 1899, before being seconded for service in the Second Boer War in December.

== Second Boer War ==
In South Africa, Vaughan was the senior aide-de-camp and deputy assistant adjutant-general to Lieutenant-General John French, the commander of the Cavalry Division, and was mentioned in dispatches in February 1900, He was appointeda brigade major the same month. He was promoted to brevet major on 29 November 1900.

By March 1902, Vaughan was acting as the intelligence officer for a column consisting of the 7th Hussars and the 2nd Dragoon Guards (Queen's Bays). On 1 April he captured Commandant Pretorius as he was trying to escape and was soon after seriously wounded. However, for his conduct during the campaign, he was made a Companion of the Distinguished Service Order (DSO) and twice more mentioned in dispatches (including one dated 1 June 1902, where he is commended for valuable work in the action at Holspruit 1 April 1902). He left Cape Town on the SS Roslin Castle in late May 1902, and arrived home the following month. After the war, in January 1904, having recovered from his injuries, Vaughan became the brigade major for the 1st Cavalry Brigade.

=== 10th (The Prince of Wales's Own) Royal Hussars ===
On 14 May 1904, Vaughan was promoted to substantive major and transferred to the 10th (The Prince of Wales's Own) Royal Hussars. In May 1908 he was promoted to lieutenant colonel and given command of the 10th Hussars, taking over from Charles Kavanagh.

His tenure in command ended in January 1911 when Vaughan succeeded Colonel William Henry Birkbeck as commandant of the Cavalry School, with the temporary rank of colonel, which in December became substantive.

Vaughan during this time was also a noted Polo player with a handicap of eight. He was one of a small group of commanding officer that also played for their regiment's Polo team, Hubert Gough 16th (Queen's) Lancers with Bertram Portal and Douglas Haig both 17th (The Duke of Cambridge's Own) Lancers being the others. Another sport Vaughan participated in was fox hunting, he even included it on the syllabus of the Cavalry School under the pretext "memory training". It was while he was at the Cavalry School that he married Louisa Evelyn, 22 October 1913, the eldest daughter of a Captain J. Stewart of Cardiganshire.

== First World War ==
At the start of the First World War Vaughan was chief of staff (GSO1) for Major General Edmund Allenby, general officer commanding (GOC) of the 1st Cavalry Division. Then, on 16 September 1914, he was promoted to the temporary rank of brigadier general and took over from Brigadier General Hubert Gough as the commander of the 3rd Cavalry Brigade. The three regiments under his command being the 4th (Queen's Own) Hussars, 5th (Royal Irish) Lancers and the 16th (The Queen's) Lancers. Vaughan wrote about his time in command of the brigade;

I was of course more than sorry to leave 3rd Cavalry Brigade with whom I had been for the toughest part of the war with very few men, very few shells and no reserves. I had however always absolute confidence in every unit and they had proved themselves absolutely reliable and versatile in everything they were asked to do.

In October 1915, Vaughan was promoted to temporary major general and succeeded Major General Charles Briggs as GOC of the 3rd Cavalry Division, which had the 6th, 7th and the 8th Cavalry Brigades and supporting units under its command. While still in command he was made a deputy lieutenant for Merionethshire in October 1917. His command of the division ended on 14 March 1918, when he became the inspector of quarter master general services.

During his time as GOC of the division, it was not involved in any major battles in 1916, then in 1917 it participated in the First Battle of the Scarpe (9–12 April) and the attack at Monchy-le-Preux (10–11 April) both part of the Battle of Arras.

During the war Vaughan was again mentioned in despatches, made a Companion of the Order of the Bath in February 1915 and given a Bar to the DSO in 1919 and also became a Commander of the Légion d'honneur.

== Later life ==
Vaughan retired from the army on 1 March 1920 and was granted the honorary rank of major general.

In 1932 he became the Welsh president of the British Legion, a justice of the peace and remained the deputy lieutenant of Merionethshire until 1954. He briefly returned to the army during the Second World War as a zone commander in the Home Guard. In 1955 he had a book published, Cavalry and Sporting Memories, recounting some of his experiences. John Vaughan died after falling off his horse 21 January 1956, aged 84.

== Bibliography ==
- Becke, Major A.F (1935). Order of Battle of Divisions Part 1. The Regular British Divisions. London: His Majesty's Stationery Office. ISBN 184734738X.
- Byrne, Ciaran (2007). The Harp and Crown, the History of the 5th (Royal Irish) Lancers, 1902-1922. Lulu.com. ISBN 978-1847533395.
- Gardner, Nikolas (2003). Trial by Fire, Command and the British Expeditionary Force in 1914. Greenwood Publishing Group. ISBN 0313324735.
- Laffaye, Horace A (2009). The Evolution of Polo. McFarland. ISBN 978-0786454150.
- Mason, Tony; Riedi, Eliza (2010). Sport and the Military, The British Armed Forces 1880-1960. Cambridge University Press. ISBN 978-1139788977.
