= 2nd Cavalry Division (United Kingdom) =

Inactive British Army formation

- Division insignia
- Active: 13 September 1914 – 31 March 1919
- Country: United Kingdom
- Branch: British Army
- Type: Cavalry
- Size: Division
- Part of: Cavalry Corps
- Engagements: World War I First Battle of the Aisne (1914) Second Battle of Ypres (1915) Battle of Arras (1917) Battle of Cambrai (1917) Operation Michael (Somme, 1918) Battle of Amiens (1918) Second Battle of the Somme (1918) Hindenburg Line (1918) Advance in Picardy (1918)

Commanders
- Notable commanders: Hubert Gough; Charles Kavanagh; Philip Chetwode

The 2nd Cavalry Division was a division of the regular British Army that saw service in the Peninsular War and in World War I, when it also known as Gough's Command, after its commanding general. It was part of the British Expeditionary Force that served in France in from 1914 to 1918. It was involved in most of the major actions where cavalry were used as a mounted mobile force, and also many where the troops were dismounted and effectively served as infantry.

On 11 November 1918 units of the division were east and north-east of Mons, in Belgium. Orders were received that the division would lead the advance of Fourth Army into Germany, a move that was to begin on 17 November 1918. On 1 December it crossed the frontier south of St. Vith. The winter was spent south of Liège, and demobilisation commenced. The division ceased to exist on 31 March 1919.

After the war the division was reformed in the Territorial Army.

== History ==
=== Napoleonic Wars ===
During the Peninsular War, Wellington organized his cavalry into one, later two, cavalry divisions. They performed a purely administrative, rather than tactical, role; the normal tactical headquarters were provided by brigades commanding two, later usually three, regiments. On 19 June 1811, the cavalry was reorganized as two divisions and the existing Cavalry Division was redesignated as 1st Cavalry Division with the formation of the 2nd Cavalry Division.

Major General Sir William Erskine took command on formation. He was absent from 8 December 1811 to 8 April 1812, though at this time the division only comprised one brigade. He resumed command briefly, but committed suicide in Lisbon on 13 February 1813. The divisions were once again amalgamated as The Cavalry Division on 21 April 1813 with Lieutenant General Stapleton Cotton (of the 1st Cavalry Division) in command.

==== Assigned Brigades ====
The division was formed on 19 June 1811 with De Grey's and Long's Brigades; Long's Brigade was to remain with the division throughout its existence. Between 8 November 1811 and 23 March 1812 it commanded just one brigade and it never exceed three brigades in strength.

Brigade	From	To
De Grey's	19 June 1811 (Note: De Grey's Brigade transferred from The Cavalry Division on formation of the 2nd Cavalry Division.)	5 October 1811 (Note: Brigade transferred to the 1st Cavalry Division.)
Long's	19 June 1811 (Note: Long's Brigade was formed on 13 June 1811 and joined 2nd Cavalry Division on formation on 19 June 1811.)	21 April 1813 (Note: Brigade transferred to The Cavalry Division when the two cavalry divisions were amalgamated.)
Le Marchant's	30 August 1811 (Note: Brigade was newly formed and joined the division.)	8 November 1811 (Note: Le Marchant's Brigade transferred to the 1st Cavalry Division to replace Madden's Portuguese Brigade.)
von Bock's	23 March 1812	14 April 1812
Slade's	14 April 1812 (Note: Brigade transferred from the 1st Cavalry Division.)	21 April 1813
Rebow's	25 January 1813	5 February 1813
Grant's	15 April 1813	21 April 1813

=== First World War ===
==== Gough's Command ====
On 6 September, the formerly independent 5th Cavalry Brigade was joined with the 3rd Cavalry Brigade from the Cavalry Division as Gough's Command. Named for the commander of 3rd Cavalry Brigade, Brigadier-General Hubert Gough, it took part in the First Battle of the Aisne (12–15 September). On 13 September, the command was re-designated as the 2nd Cavalry Division, with the addition of divisional troops from the Royal Horse Artillery, Royal Engineers etc.

The 4th Cavalry Brigade joined the division on 14 October from 1st Cavalry Division to bring it up to the standard three brigade strength. The division remained on the Western Front until the end of the war.

==== 1914–1917 ====
In 1914, the division took part in First Battle of Ypres, notably the battle of Gheluvelt (29–31 October). In 1915, the division was in action at the Battle of Neuve Chapelle (10–12 March 1915) and the Second Battle of Ypres notable the Battle of St Julien (26 April–3 May) and the Battle of Bellewaarde Ridge (24–25 May).

1916 saw no notable actions, but in 1917 the division saw action in the Battle of Arras (First Battle of the Scarpe, 9–11 April). and the Battle of Cambrai (the Tank Attack of 20 and 21 November, the Capture of Bourlon Wood of 24–28 November and the German Counter-Attack of 30 November–3 December). At other times, the brigades formed dismounted units and served in the trenches as regiments under the command of their brigadiers.

==== War of movement ====
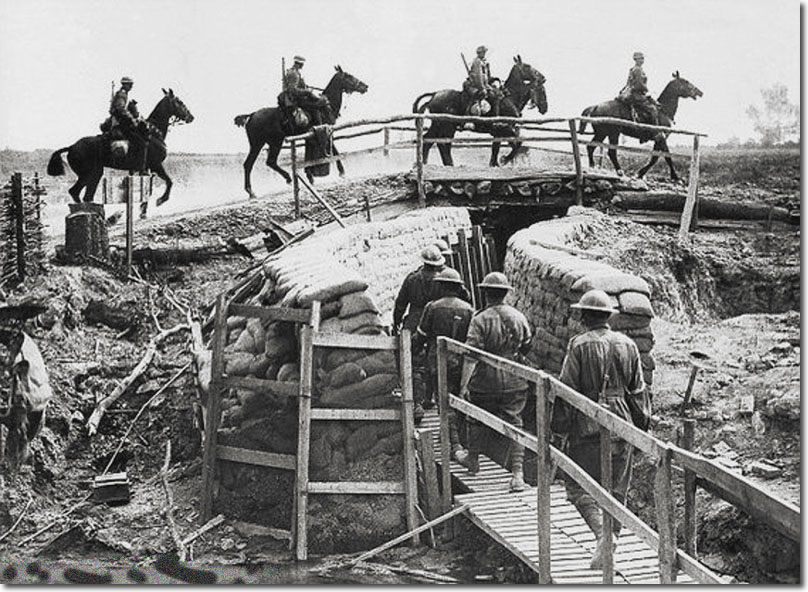
Men of the 20th Hussars on patrol in 1918.

1918 saw the return of the war of movement and the division took part in the First Battle of the Somme notably the Battle of St Quentin (21–23 March), the Battle of the Lys (Battle of Hazebrouck of 14–15 April), the Battle of Amiens (8–11 August) and the Second Battle of the Somme (Battle of Albert of 21–23 August and the Second Battle of Bapaume of 31 August–3 September).

The division was then split up with the 3rd Cavalry Brigade serving with First Army, 4th Cavalry Brigade with Third Army and 5th Cavalry Brigade with Fourth Army. The brigades variously took part in the battles of the Hindenburg Line: the battles of Canal du Nord (27 September–1 October), St. Quentin Canal (29 September–2 October), Beaurevoir Line (3–5 October) and Cambrai (8–9 October) and the Pursuit to the Selle (9–12 October). Its final action was to take part in the Advance in Picardy (17 October–11 November) including the Battle of the Sambre (4 November) and the capture of Mons (11 November, 3rd Canadian Division with 5th (Royal Irish) Lancers and one section (Note: A Subsection consisted of a single gun and limber drawn by six horses (with three drivers), eight gunners (riding on the limber or mounted on their own horses), and an ammunition wagon also drawn by six horses (with three drivers). Two Subsections formed a Section and in a six gun battery these would be designated as Left, Centre and Right Sections.) of D Battery, RHA).

==== Armistice ====
At the Armistice, units of the division had reached Clairfayts (5th Cavalry Brigade with Fourth Army), Erquelinnes (4th Cavalry Brigade with Third Army) and Havré and St. Denis (3rd Cavalry Brigade with First Army). On 15 November, the division was re-assembled near Maubeuge and ordered to advance into Germany as an advance screen for Fourth Army and form part of the Occupation Force. The move began on 17 November, Ciney and Rochefort were reached five days later and the 5th Cavalry Brigade crossed the German border south of St. Vith on 1 December.

In late December, the division moved to winter quarters south and south-east of Liège. It remained here until 30 January 1919 when it exchanged regiments with 1st and 3rd Cavalry Divisions then gradually moved back to England. The Division ceased to exist at midnight 31 March / 1 April 1919.

==== Order of battle ====
===== 3rd Cavalry Brigade =====
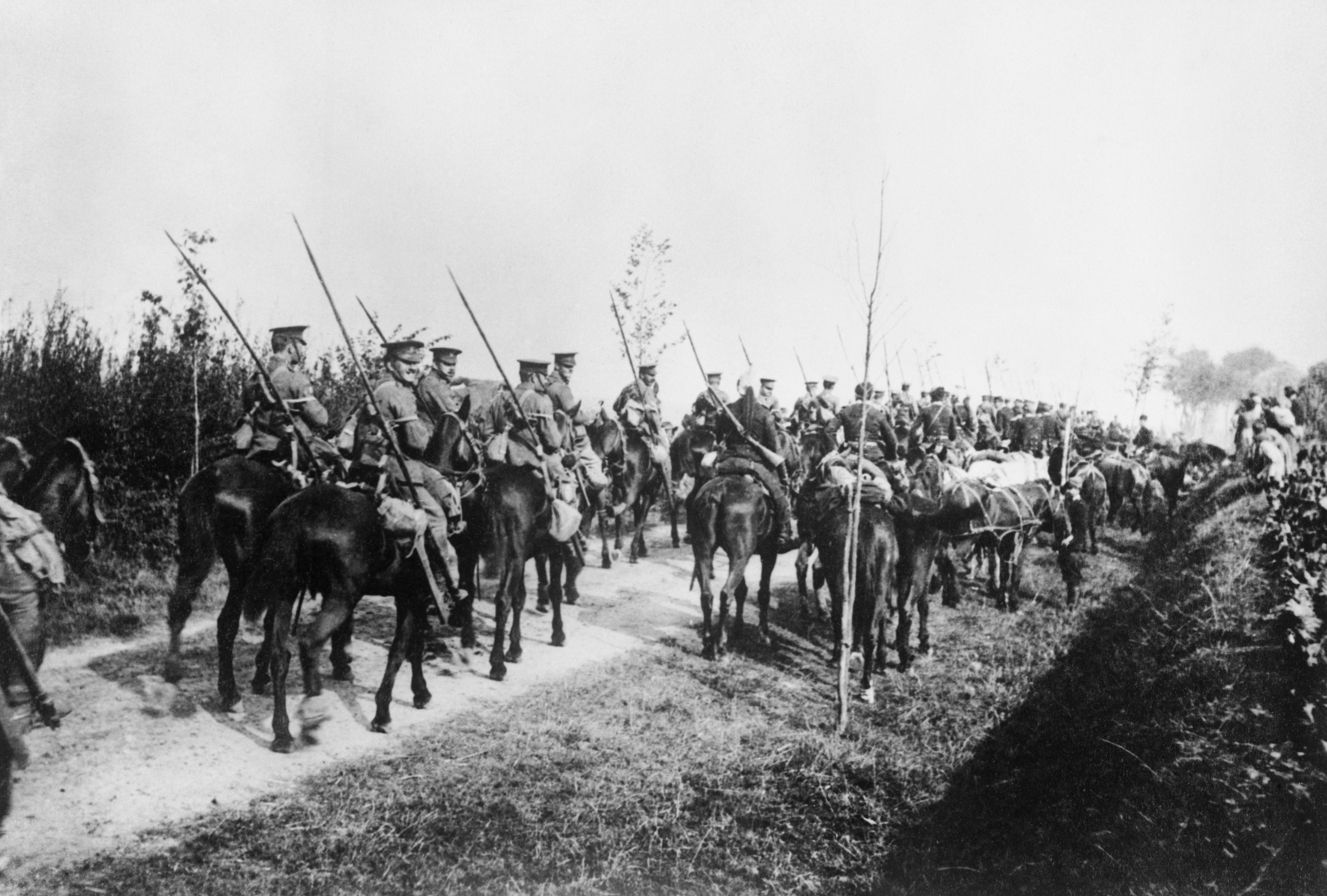
The Retreat from Mons: 16th Lancers on the march, September 1914.

The brigade joined Gough's Command on 6 September from The Cavalry Division and remained with the division until the end of the war.

Unit	From	To
4th (Queen’s Own) Hussars	Mobilization	
5th (Royal Irish) Lancers	Mobilization	
16th (Queen’s) Lancers	Mobilization	
1/1st Leicestershire Yeomanry	4 April 1918 (Note: Leicestershire Yeomanry was originally with 8th Cavalry Brigade, 3rd Cavalry Division. It left the brigade on 14 March 1918 to become a cyclist unit, then to form a machine gun battalion with the North Somerset Yeomanry. The German spring offensive forestalled this plan and the regiment was remounted and sent to the 2nd Cavalry Division. From 4 April it was split up with a squadron joining each regiment in 3rd Cavalry Brigade.)	
D Battery, RHA	17 September 1914 (Note: D Battery, RHA was permanently attached to 3rd Cavalry Brigade from the Division's III Brigade, RHA.)	
3rd Signal Troop, Royal Engineers	Mobilization	
3rd Cavalry Brigade Field Ambulance	Mobilization	13 September 1914 (Note: 3rd Cavalry Brigade Field Ambulance remained with 1st Cavalry Division when the brigade transferred to 2nd Cavalry Division.)
3rd Cavalry Brigade Machine Gun Squadron, MGC	29 February 1916 (Note: Cavalry Brigade Machine Gun Squadrons were formed from the machine gun sections of the brigades' constituent regiments.)	

===== 4th Cavalry Brigade =====
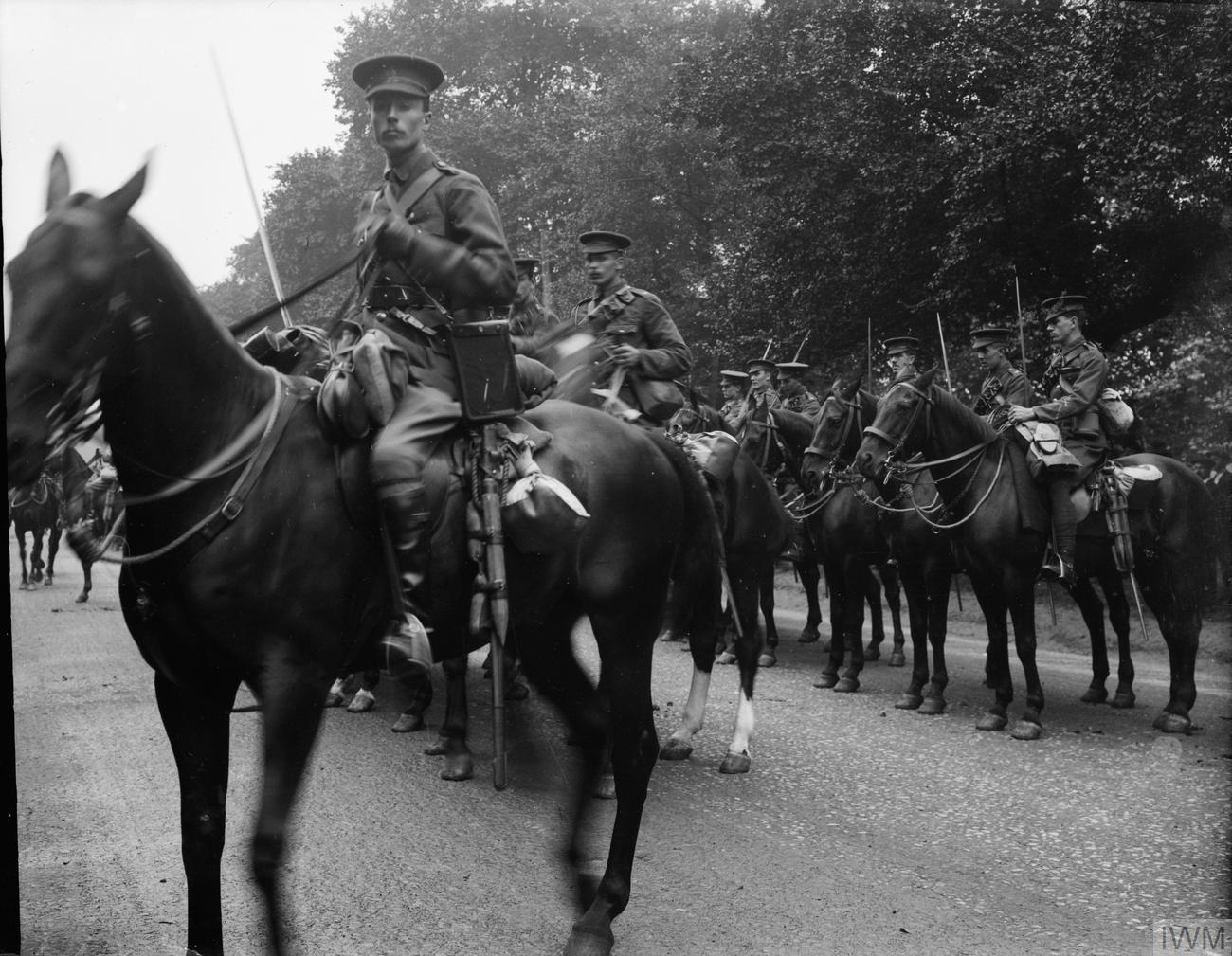
Squadron from the 1st Life Guards August 1914, attached to the Household Cavalry Composite Regiment, preparing to leave for France.

The brigade joined the division on 14 October from 1st Cavalry Division and remained with the division until the end of the war.

Unit	From	To
Household Cavalry Composite Regiment	Mobilization	11 November 1914 (Note: The Household Cavalry Composite Regiment was broken up and the squadrons rejoined their parent regiments.)
6th Dragoon Guards (Carabiniers)	Mobilization	
3rd (King's Own) Hussars	Mobilization	
1/1st Queen's Own Oxfordshire Hussars	11 November 1914 (Note: Queen's Own Oxfordshire Hussars, a Yeomanry regiment, joined from 2nd South Midland Mounted Brigade to replace the Household Cavalry Composite Regiment.)	
J Battery, RHA	16 September 1914 (Note: J Battery, RHA transferred from 5th Cavalry Brigade to 4th Cavalry Brigade and was permanently attached thereafter.)	
4th Signal Troop, Royal Engineers	Mobilization	
4th Cavalry Brigade Field Ambulance	Mobilization	16 October 1914 (Note: 4th Cavalry Brigade Field Ambulance transferred to 2nd Cavalry Division when the brigade joined from 1st Cavalry Division.)
4th Cavalry Brigade Machine Gun Squadron, MGC	28 February 1916	

===== 5th Cavalry Brigade =====
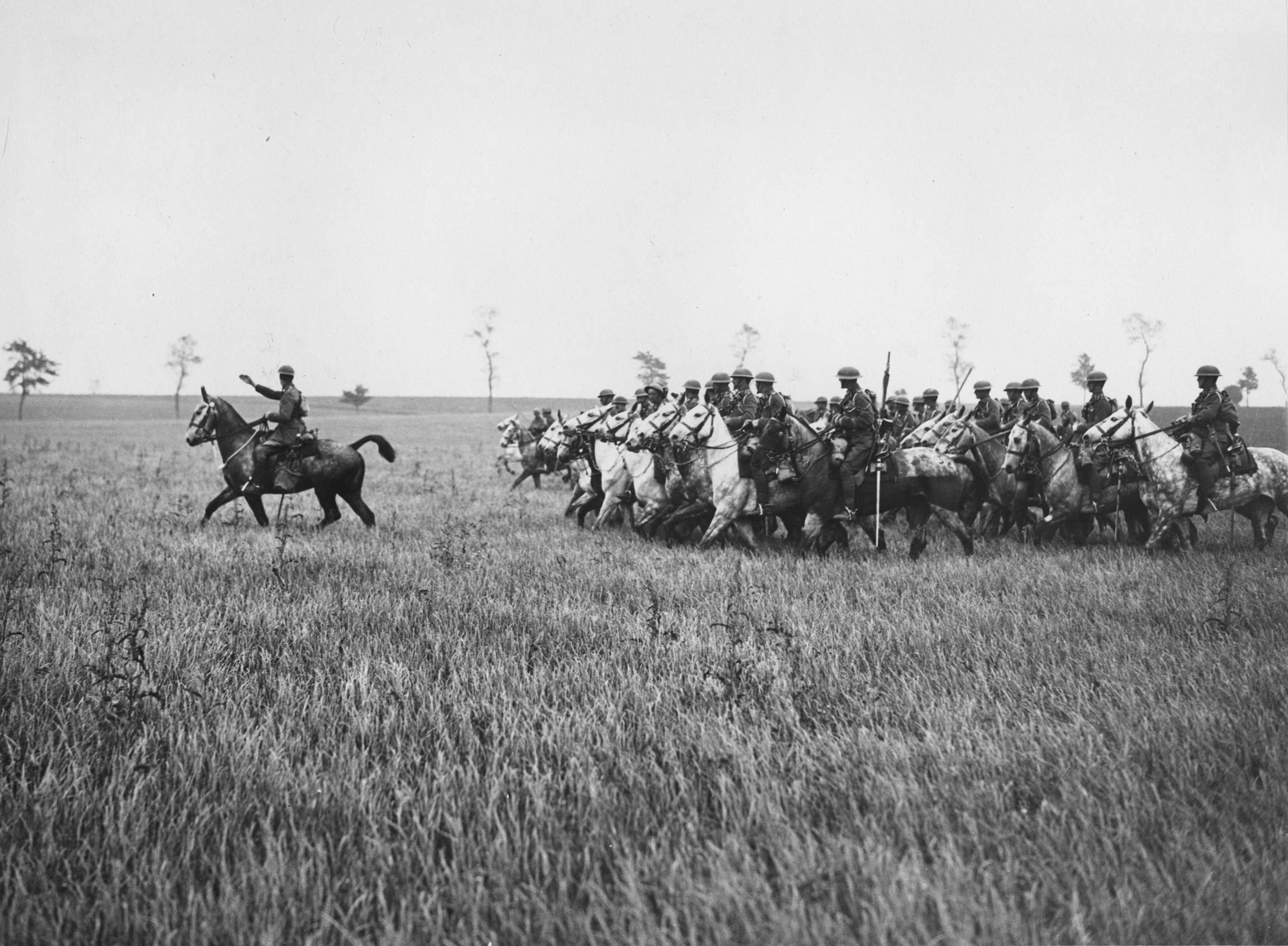
2nd Dragoons (Royal Scots Greys) training in France during the First World War.

The brigade, formerly independent, joined Gough's Command on 6 September and remained with the division until the end of the war.

Unit	From	To
2nd Dragoons (Royal Scots Greys)	Mobilization	
12th Royal Lancers (Prince of Wales's)	Mobilization	
20th Hussars	Mobilization	
J Battery, RHA	Mobilization	16 September 1914
E Battery, RHA	17 September 1914 (Note: E Battery, RHA was permanently attached to 5th Cavalry Brigade from the Division's III Brigade, RHA.)	
4th Field Troop, Royal Engineers	Mobilization	15 October 1914 (Note: 4th Field Troop, RE absorbed into 2nd Field Squadron, RE.)
5th Signal Troop, Royal Engineers	Mobilization	
5th Cavalry Brigade Field Ambulance	Mobilization	13 September 1914 (Note: 5th Cavalry Brigade Field Ambulance transferred to 2nd Cavalry Division when the brigade joined the division.)
5th Cavalry Brigade Machine Gun Squadron, MGC	28 February 1916	

===== Divisional Artillery =====
III Brigade, Royal Horse Artillery

D Battery, Royal Horse Artillery attached to 3rd Cavalry Brigade (Note: Equipped with six 13 pounders.)
E Battery, Royal Horse Artillery attached to 5th Cavalry Brigade
J Battery, Royal Horse Artillery attached to 4th Cavalry Brigade
1/1st Warwickshire Battery, RHA (TF) (Note: 1/1st Warwickshire Battery, RHA was attached from 4 December 1914 to 14 April 1915. It then transferred to 9th Cavalry Brigade, 1st Cavalry Division.)
III Brigade Ammunition Column

===== Divisional Troops =====
The division was supported by the following units:

	Unit	From	To
Engineers	2nd Field Squadron, Royal Engineers	16 October 1914	
Signals	2nd Signal Squadron, Royal Engineers	28 September 1914	
Medical	2nd Cavalry Field Ambulance	13 September 1914 (Note: 2nd Cavalry Field Ambulance joined with 3rd Cavalry Brigade from 1st Cavalry Division.)	
Medical	5th Cavalry Field Ambulance	13 September 1914	
Medical	4th Cavalry Field Ambulance	16 October 1914	
Medical	No. 4 Sanitary Section	12 January 1915	
Medical	2nd Cavalry Division Field Ambulance Workshop	26 February 1915	16 April 1916 (Note: 2nd Cavalry Division Field Ambulance Workshop absorbed into Divisional Supply Column.)
Veterinary	7th Mobile Veterinary Section	16 September 1914	
Veterinary	8th Mobile Veterinary Section	16 September 1914 (Note: 8th Mobile Veterinary Section joined with 3rd Cavalry Brigade from 1st Cavalry Division.)	
Veterinary	9th Mobile Veterinary Section	15 October 1915 (Note: 9th Mobile Veterinary Section joined with 4th Cavalry Brigade from 1st Cavalry Division.)	
Army Service Corps	424th (Horsed Transport) Company, ASC; HQ 2nd Cavalry Divisional ASC	10 October 1914	
Army Service Corps	575th (Horsed Transport) Company, ASC; 2nd Cavalry Divisional Auxiliary (Horse) Company	25 September 1915	
Army Service Corps	46th (Mechanical Transport) Company, ASC; 2nd Cavalry Divisional Supply Column	Formation	
Army Service Corps	413th (Mechanical Transport) Company, ASC; 2nd Cavalry Divisional Supply Column	Formation	10 October 1916 (Note: 413th (M. T.) Company, ASC absorbed into 46th (M. T.) Company, ASC.)
Army Service Corps	56th (Mechanical Transport) Company, ASC; 2nd Cavalry Divisional Ammunition Park	Formation	23 December 1917
Others	772nd Divisional Employment Company	16 September 1917	

=== Territorial Army ===
In the 1920s the division was reformed from Yeomanry regiments in the Territorial Army with the following organisation:

5th Cavalry Brigade

- Yorkshire Hussars (Alexandra, Princess of Wales's Own)
- Yorkshire Dragoons (Queen's Own)
- Nottinghamshire Yeomanry (Sherwood Rangers)

6th Cavalry Brigade

- Warwickshire Yeomanry
- Staffordshire Yeomanry (Queen's Own Royal Regiment)
- Leicestershire Yeomanry (Prince Albert's Own)

Royal Artillery

- 11th (Honourable Artillery Company and City of London Yeomanry) Brigade, Royal Horse Artillery
  - A & B HAC Batteries
  - No 1 City of London (Yeomanry) Battery

Royal Engineers

- 2nd Cavalry Divisional Royal Engineers
  - 2nd (Cheshire) Field Squadron

Royal Corps of Signals

- 2nd Cavalry Divisional Signals (Middlesex Yeomanry)
  - A & B (Middlesex Yeomanry) Squadrons

Royal Army Service Corps

- 2nd Cavalry Divisional Train
  - No 529 (Cheshire) Cavalry (Horse Transport) Company
  - No 530 (Cheshire) Cavalry (Mechanical Transport) Company

Royal Army Medical Corps

- 170th Cavalry Field Ambulance

Royal Army Ordnance Corps

- 2nd Cavalry Divisional Detachment

On the outbreak of World War II 2nd Cavalry Division's units were reorganised as 1st Cavalry Division and served in Palestine, Iraq and Syria before being converted into 10th Armoured Division on 1 August 1941.

== Commanders ==
The 2nd Cavalry Division had the following commanders:

From	Rank	Name
Formation	Major-General	Sir H. de la P. Gough
19 April 1915	Major-General	C.T.McM. Kavanagh
15 July 1915	Major-General	Sir P.W. Chetwode, Bt.
6 November 1916	Brigadier-General	T.T. Pitman (acting)
16 November 1916	Major-General	W.H. Greenly (Note: Assigned to temporary command of 14th (Light) Division on 22 March 1918.)
22 March 1918	Brigadier-General	T.T. Pitman (acting)
27 March 1918	Major-General	W.H. Greenly (sick, 28 March 1918)
28 March 1918	Brigadier-General	T.T. Pitman (acting)
16 April 1918	Major-General	T.T. Pitman

== See also ==
- List of British divisions in World War I
- British Army during World War I
- British Cavalry Corps order of battle 1914
- British cavalry during the First World War
