= Z Battery Royal Artillery =

British Army artillery battery

Z Battery Royal Horse Artillery Z Battery Royal Artillery
- Active: 1 April 1824 – present
- Country: United Kingdom
- Allegiance: Hon East India Coy (till 1858); United Kingdom (post 1858)
- Branch: British Army
- Type: Artillery
- Role: Surveillance and Target Acquisition
- Size: Battery
- Location: Catterick Garrison
- Equipment: COBRA, MAMBA, LCMR, ASP
- Engagements: Anglo-Egyptian War; First World War; Second World War
- Battle honours: Ubique

Z Battery RA was a Battery of 5th Regiment Royal Artillery in the Royal Artillery. It had the Surveillance and Target Acquisition role and was equipped with various weapon platform locating equipment using radars and acoustic sound ranging assets.

== Early history ==
=== First formation ===
Z Battery was originally raised in Poona, India on 1 April 1824 as 4th Troop, Bombay Horse Artillery, part of the Bombay Presidency Army of the Honourable East India Company.

As a result of the Indian Rebellion of 1857, the British Crown took direct control of India from the East India Company on 1 November 1858 under the provisions of the Government of India Act 1858. The Presidency armies transferred to the direct authority of the British Crown and its European units were transferred to the British Army. Henceforth artillery, the mutineers most effective arm, was to be the sole preserve of the British Army (with the exception of certain Mountain Artillery batteries). On 19 February 1862, the Bombay Horse Artillery transferred to the Royal Horse Artillery as its 4th Brigade (Note: The original Horse Brigade Royal Artillery formed 1st Horse Brigade RA, the 1st Brigade Bengal Horse Artillery became 2nd Horse Brigade RA, the Madras Horse Artillery became 3rd Horse Brigade RA, the Bombay Horse Artillery became 4th Horse Brigade RA and the 2nd Brigade Bengal Horse Artillery became 5th Horse Brigade RA. The 3rd Brigade Bengal Horse Artillery was split between 2nd and 5th Horse Brigades RA. These brigades performed an administrative, rather than tactical, role.) and 4th Troop became D Battery, 4th Horse Brigade, RA.

A reorganization of the horse artillery on 13 April 1864 saw 1st Brigade split as A and B Brigades, 2nd Brigade became C Brigade, 3rd Brigade became D Brigade, 4th Brigade became E Brigade, and 5th Brigade became F Brigade. As battery designations were tied to the brigade the battery was assigned to, the battery was now designated D Battery, E Brigade, the first of a bewildering series of redesignations. From 1866, the term "Royal Horse Artillery" appeared in Army List hence the battery was designated D Battery, E Brigade, RHA from about this time. Throughout this period, the battery was based at Ahmednager. On 1 February 1871 it was designated H Battery, C Brigade, became H Battery, D Brigade on 16 January 1873 and E Battery, E Brigade on 1 April 1875.

Another reorganization on 1 July 1877 saw E Brigade disbanded with its batteries distributed amongst A, B and C Brigades. The battery was now redesignated E Battery, C Brigade at Aldershot. By January 1882, the battery was at Kirkee. On 1 April 1882, C Brigade was in its turn disbanded with its batteries distributed amongst A and B Brigades. The battery was now redesignated N Battery, A Brigade at Canterbury. The battery took part – as N/A Battery – in the Anglo-Egyptian War, notably the Battle of Tel el-Kebir in September 1882.

The battery was disbanded in February 1884. The brigade system was abolished on 1 July 1889. From now on, RHA batteries would be designated in a single sequence.

=== Reformed ===
Z Battery, RHA was reformed on 13 February 1900, and stationed at Newbridge Barracks. The Brigade system was revived on 1 March 1901 and the battery was assigned to the 4th Brigade-Division, RHA on formation (along with AA Battery, RHA). (Note: From 1 July 1889, RHA batteries were lettered in a single alphabetical sequence in order of seniority from date of formation. When more than 26 batteries were needed, double letters were used, AA, BB, etc.) In 1903, the brigade was redesignated IV Brigade, RHA and was stationed at Newbridge in Ireland. On 1 October 1906, the brigade was redesignated XIV Brigade, Royal Horse Artillery and was broken up on 1 August 1913. The battery was transferred to II Brigade, Royal Horse Artillery at Canterbury (Note: Frederick says I Brigade, Royal Horse Artillery.) and was disbanded again on 24 December 1913.

== World War I ==
=== (Tempy) Z Battery ===
As a result of the action at Néry on 1 September 1914, L Battery, RHA was almost destroyed as an operational unit: of five Officers, three were killed and two wounded; of 200 Other Ranks, 20 were killed and 29 wounded; and five of six 13 pounders were lost. It had to be withdrawn to England to reform. (Tempy) Z Battery, RHA was formed on 1 September from the Centre and Left Sections (Note: A Subsection consisted of a single gun and limber drawn by six horses (with three drivers), eight gunners (riding on the limber or mounted on their own horses), and an ammunition wagon also drawn by six horses (with three drivers). Two Subsections formed a Section and in a six gun battery these would be designated as Left, Centre and Right Sections.) of I Battery, RHA to replace L Battery in VII Brigade, Royal Horse Artillery, 1st Cavalry Division. On 3 September, the Left Section of I Battery was replaced by a section of D Battery, RHA. On 15 September, this section returned to D Battery and on 17 September a section of J Battery, RHA joined. On 27 September, the sections of I and J returned to their batteries and (Tempy) Z Battery ceased to exist. The next day, H Battery, RHA joined 1st Cavalry Division in its place. During the battery's brief existence, 1st Cavalry Division saw action in the First Battle of the Marne and the First Battle of the Aisne.

=== Z Battery ===
Z Battery, RHA was reformed on 9 October 1914 equipped with six 13 pounders. It joined the Ipswich based G Battery and O Battery in V Brigade, Royal Horse Artillery. V Brigade, RHA was assigned to 8th Division on formation in October 1914. With 8th Division, it crossed to France on 4 and 5 November 1914 and served with the division on the Western Front until January 1917. While with the division, it served in the battles of Neuve Chapelle, Aubers Ridge, and of the Somme. On 8 June 1915, the battery was re-armed with six 18 pounders.

On 13 January 1917, V Brigade, RHA left 8th Division and became V Army Brigade, RHA. (Note: Army Brigades, RHA and RFA were artillery brigades that were excess to the needs of the divisions, withdrawn to form an artillery reserve.) At the Armistice, it was serving as Army Troops with the Fourth Army.

By October 1919, the battery had joined the newly reformed VIII Brigade, Royal Horse Artillery. On 4 January 1920, the battery was absorbed into B Battery, RHA.

== Recent operations ==
Z Battery deployed on Operation Herrick 13 and 18 in Afghanistan.

== See also ==
- British Army
- Royal Artillery
- Royal Horse Artillery
- List of Royal Artillery Batteries

== Bibliography ==
- Becke, Archibald F. (1935). Order of Battle of Divisions Part 1–The Regular British Divisions. London: HMSO. OCLC 4405016.
- Clarke, W.G. (1993). Horse Gunners: The Royal Horse Artillery, 200 Years of Panache and Professionalism. Woolwich: The Royal Artillery Institution. ISBN 09520762-0-9.
- Frederick, J.B.M. (1984). Lineage Book of British Land Forces 1660-1978. Wakefield, Yorkshire: Microform Academic Publishers. ISBN 1-85117-009-X.
- Lomas, David (1997). Mons 1914: The BEF's Tactical Triumph. Vol. 49 of Campaign Series. Oxford: Osprey. ISBN 1-85532-551-9.
- Order of Battle of the British Armies in France, November 11th, 1918. France: General Staff, GHQ. 1918.
