= Charles Kavanagh =

British Army general (1864–1950)

Lieutenant-General Sir Charles Kavanagh KCB KCMG CVO DSO
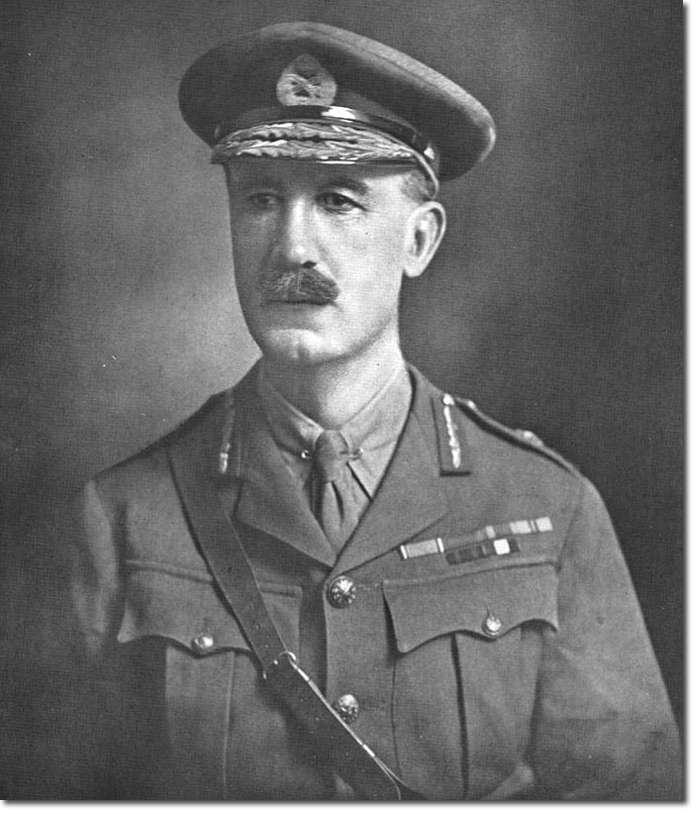
- Born: 25 March 1864; Borris, County Carlow, Ireland
- Died: 11 October 1950 (aged 86)
- Military career
- Allegiance: United Kingdom
- Branch: British Army
- Service years: 1884–1920
- Rank: Lieutenant-General
- Units: 3rd Dragoon Guards; 10th Royal Hussars
- Commands: 10th Royal Hussars; 1st Cavalry Brigade; 7th Cavalry Brigade; 2nd Cavalry Division; 5th Infantry Division; Cavalry Corps
- Conflicts: Second Boer War; First World War
- Awards: Knight Commander of the Order of the Bath; Knight Commander of the Order of St Michael and St George; Commander of the Royal Victorian Order; Distinguished Service Order; Mentioned in Despatches; Legion of Honour

Lieutenant-General Sir Charles Toler MacMorrough Kavanagh, KCB, KCMG, CVO, DSO (25 March 1864 – 11 October 1950) was a British Army officer who commanded the Cavalry Corps during the First World War, most notably at the Battle of Amiens in 1918.

== Early life and military career ==
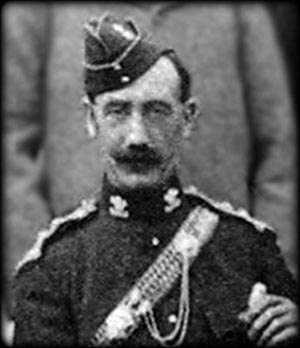
Kavanagh, pictured here in 1899 as a captain and adjutant to the 6th Yeomanry Brigade.

Kavanagh was born in March 1864 in Borris, County Carlow, the son of Arthur MacMurrough Kavanagh, The MacMurrough and Mary Frances Forde-Leathley. He received his education at Harrow School before going on to the Royal Military College at Sandhurst in 1882, from where he was commissioned as a second lieutenant into the 3rd Dragoon Guards of the British Army in February 1884, although he transferred to the 10th Hussars just two weeks later. In March 1889 he was seconded from his regiment and sent to Jamaica where he served for a time as aide-de-camp to the governor of Jamaica at the time, Henry Arthur Blake.

In 1890 he returned to the 10th Hussars to assume command of a troop and was promoted to captain in April 1891. In June 1895 he was appointed adjutant to the 6th Yeomanry Brigade (Prince Albert's Own Leicestershire Yeomanry Cavalry and Derbyshire Yeomanry Cavalry).

He served in the Second Boer War, which began in October 1899, as commanding officer (CO) of the 10th Hussars, and was promoted to major in January 1900, and then to the brevet rank of lieutenant colonel in November of that year. While in command of a mobile column, Kavanagh vigorously pursued Jan Smuts, who later admitted that Kavanagh had in fact come closer than anyone else in capturing him.

Following the end of the war in May 1902, Kavanagh, now nicknamed Major Push-Along by the men under his command, returned to the United Kingdom in the "SS Dunottar Castle", which arrived at Southampton in July 1902. He was mentioned in dispatches by Lord Kitchener in his final despatch, dated 23 June 1902, and received the Distinguished Service Order (DSO) for his exemplary services in the war.

He was made second-in-command of the 10th Hussars, now commanded by Lieutenant Colonel Julian Byng, which was sent to India. While there, Kavanagh played polo for his regiment. In May 1904 he was promoted to lieutenant colonel and took command of the regiment from Byng, remaining in this appointment until 1908, during which time he was promoted to brevet colonel in August 1905. In May 1909, after four years commanding the regiment, he relinquished command and was placed on half-pay and was promoted on 7 May to colonel. In May 1909 he was promoted to the temporary rank of brigadier general and succeeded Major General The Hon. Julian Byng as general officer commanding (GOC) of the 1st Cavalry Brigade, then stationed in Aldershot, Hampshire, as part of Aldershot Command.

He commanded the brigade for the next four years until May 1913 when he went on half-pay and relinquished his temporary brigadier's rank. His next assignment came in December that year in India as commander of the Fyzabad Brigade, part of the 8th (Lucknow) Division. He was promoted once more the next month to temporary brigadier general and assumed command of the brigade from Major General John B. Forster.

== First World War ==
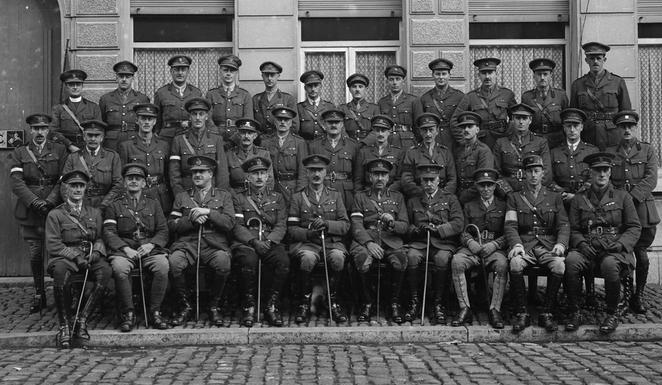
Lieutenant-General Charles Kavanagh, GOC Cavalry Corps, pictured here fifth from the left in the front row with members of his staff in November 1918.

The British entry into World War I in August 1914 found Kavanagh on leave in England. Shortly afterwards, on 10 September, he took over the newly formed 7th Cavalry Brigade which formed part of Major General The Hon. Julian Byng's newly created 3rd Cavalry Division and departed with the British Expeditionary Force (BEF) for service in France, where he would serve with distinction, most notably at the First Battle of Ypres. It was here that his skills in leadership made a difference and brought his brigade up to a high standard. He led a counterattack in early November and which many people believe saved Ypres and the BEF.

In February 1915 Kavanagh was promoted to major general "for services rendered in connection with Operations in the Field" and three months later he was made GOC of the 2nd Cavalry Division.

His time with the division was short, however, and, after playing a distinctive role in the Second Battle of Ypres, Kavanagh became GOC of the 5th Division, taking over from Major General Thomas Morland. This was one of the original Regular Army divisions of the BEF.

Holding this post until March 1916, where he was very active in the front lines and frequently seeing to the wellbeing of his men, he then received promotion to temporary lieutenant general in April and took command of I Corps from Lieutenant General Sir Hubert Gough, who had also been his predecessor as GOC 2nd Cavalry Division. Again, however, his period in command was destined to be short, lasting only until July, although in his fairly short time with the corps he managed to irritate many of his division commanders with his interferences into the front lines.

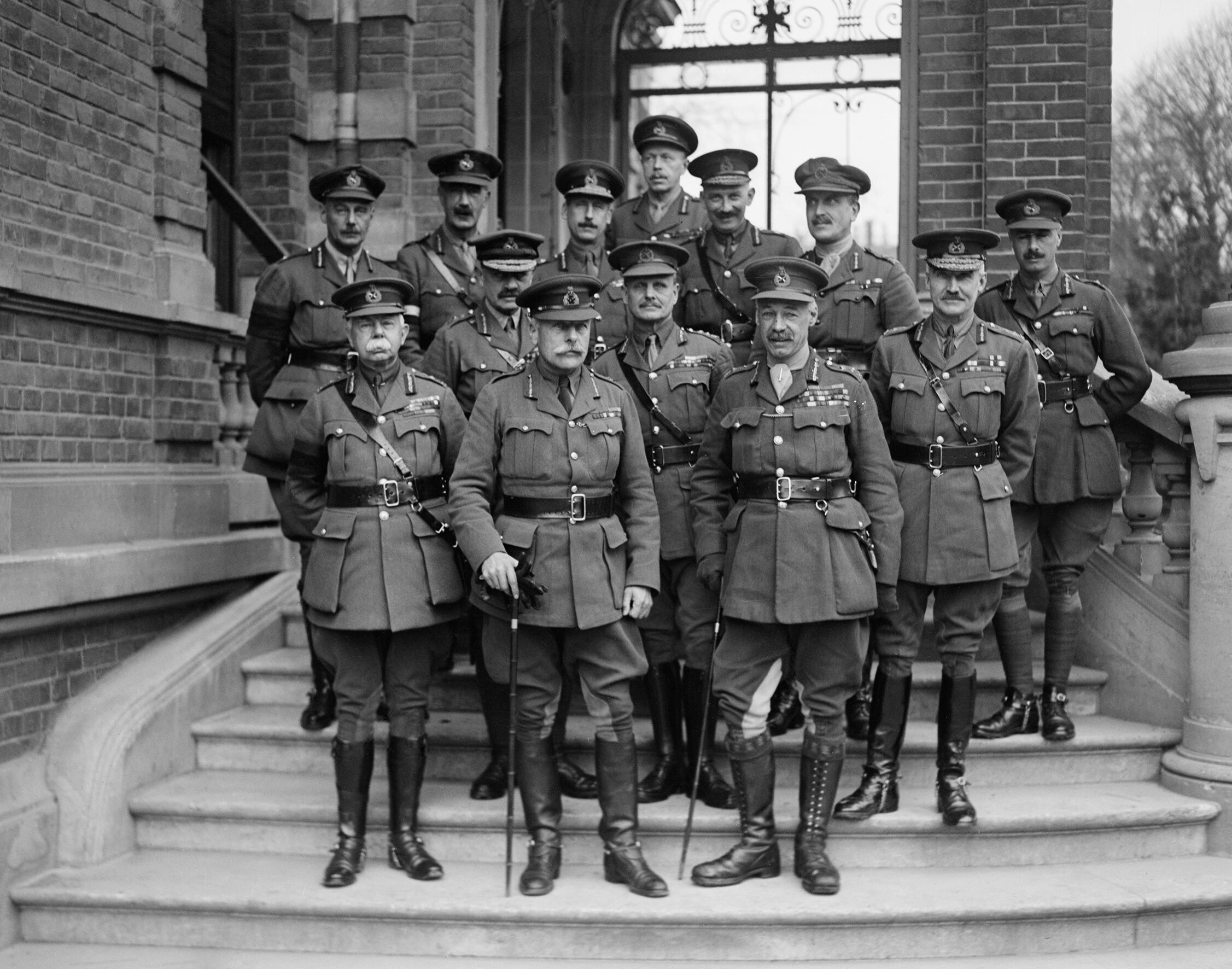
Field Marshal Sir Douglas Haig (centre front) with his senior commanders and staff officers at Cambrai, France November 1918. Stood in the third row, second on the left, is Lieutenant-General Kavanagh, GOC Cavalry Corps.

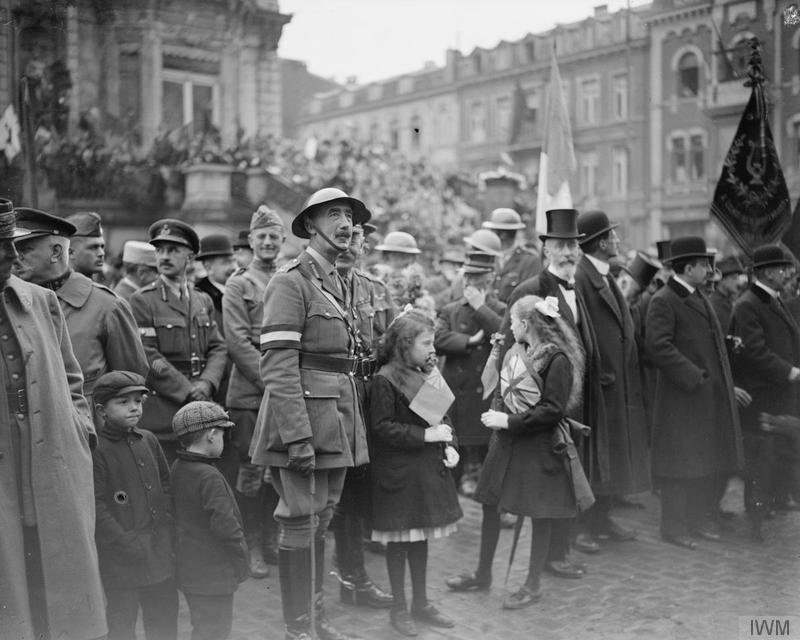
Lieutenant General Charles Kavanagh watching the 2nd Cavalry Brigade passing through Spa, Belgium, 29 November 1918.

In August Kavanagh was asked to reform the Cavalry Corps which had been broken up earlier in the year. He was to remain as its GOC until after the end of the war, which came to an end on 11 November 1918, leading it in the Battle of Amiens during the Hundred Days Offensive.

For his services in the war, he was made a Knight Commander of the Order of the Bath (KCB) in January 1917 and in 1919 a Knight Commander of the Order of St Michael and St George (KCMG), and was also granted the French Legion of Honour that year as well.

== Post-war and final years ==
He retired from the army in March 1920, with the honorary rank of lieutenant general, after well over thirty-five years of continuous service. In retirement he became Governor of the Military Knights of Windsor.

He died on 11 October 1950, at the age of 86.

== Family ==
In 1895 he married Mary Perry; they had two daughters.

Military offices
Preceded by Thomas Morland	GOC 5th Division; 1915–1916	Succeeded by Reginald Stephens
