= 1st Armoured Division Signals (United Kingdom) =

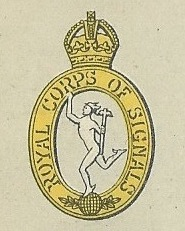
- Badge of the Royal Corps of Signals
- Active: 1912–7 December 1944
- Country: United Kingdom
- Branch: British Army
- Role: Signals
- Part of: 1st Armoured Division
- Garrison/HQ: Aldershot; Tidworth
- Engagements: First World War; Western Front; Second World War; Battle of France; Western Desert Campaign; Tunisian Campaign; Battle of Coriano

1st Armoured Division Signals was a unit (Note: Divisional signal units of the Royal Signals were battalion-sized and commanded by a Lieutenant-Colonel; they were not termed 'regiments' until 1946.) of Britain's Royal Corps of Signals providing communications for the 1st Armoured Division during the Second World War. It was present during the Battle of France, the Western Desert Campaign, including the battles of Gazala and Alamein, the Tunisian Campaign, and the Battle of Coriano during the Italian Campaign.

== Origins ==
The unit had its origins in a signal squadron of the Royal Engineers (RE) formed at Aldershot in 1912 for the Cavalry Division of the planned British Expeditionary Force (BEF). In the event of mobilisation of the BEF, the Cavalry Division would comprise the permanent 1st, 2nd, 3rd and 4th Cavalry Brigades. These had each been provided with an RE signal Troop since 1907, which were now brought together:

- 1st Signal Squadron – Aldershot
  - 1st Signal Troop – Aldershot
  - 2nd Signal Troop – Tidworth Camp
  - 3rd Signal Troop – Curragh Camp
  - 4th Signal Troop – Canterbury

The BEF and its Cavalry Division were duly mobilised on the outbreak of the First World War, on 4 August 1914, and proceeded to France, taking part in the Battle of Mons and the subsequent retreat. As reinforcements arrived, the Cavalry Division was divided, 3rd and 4th Brigades with their signal troops transferring to a new 2nd Cavalry Division in September and October. The original formation, now 1st Cavalry Division, was joined by a newly formed 9th Cavalry Brigade and its 9th Signal Troop on 14 April 1915. The division served on the Western Front throughout the war.

== Interwar ==
In 1920, the RE Signal Service became the Royal Corps of Signals (RCS), and when the Cavalry Division was reformed its communications were provided by Cavalry Divisional Signals, RCS at Bramshott with 1st Signal Troop at Aldershot and 2nd Signal Troop at Tidworth. (3rd Signal Troop was at the Curragh until Irish Independence.) By 1930, the unit was organised with HQ, B, C and E Trps at Tidworth, C Trp at Aldershot. There were also Tank Signal Sections of the RCS with each of the four battalions of the Royal Tank Corps, and that year these combined with HQ Squadron of the cavalry signals at Tidworth to form Armoured Fighting Vehicle Signals (1st Tank Brigade Signals from 1935). In 1937 the 1st and 2nd Cavalry Brigades were converted into light armoured brigades and combined with 1st Tank Brigade to form the 'Mobile Division', each brigade with its associated signal unit. An HQ Sqn for Mobile Divisional Signals was formed the following year. The division was renamed as 1st Armoured Division in 1939. (Note: A new 1st Cavalry Division was formed on 31 October 1939 with its divisional signal unit established the next day. It embarked for Palestine in January 1940 and was converted into 10th Armoured Division on 1 August 1941.)

== Second World War ==
1st Armoured Division formation badge, early pattern.

=== France ===
1st Armoured Division was still incomplete when the German offensive in the west opened on 10 May, but was rushed to France piecemeal as reinforcements. The main body of the division landed at Cherbourg Harbour but never managed to join the British Expeditionary Force. It fought under French command south of the River Somme, suffering heavy casualties, and the remnants were evacuated through Cherbourg on 16 June in Operation Aerial.

=== North Africa ===
The division reformed in the UK and served on anti-invasion defence duties, regularly having to give up its tanks and tank brigades to be sent to the Middle East. This continued until August 1941 when the bulk of the division embarked for Egypt. Having sailed round South Africa It began to disembark at Suez in late November and began desert training. It went into the line under Eighth Army in late December during Operation Crusader, but once again was employed piecemeal, and suffered badly during the fighting and retreat of January 1942 and the Battle of Gazala in May. It fought in the defence of the El Alamein position in July.

Re-equipped, 1st Armoured Division played a major role in the successful attack at the Second Battle of El Alamein and the subsequent pursuit to El Agheila and Tripoli. In February 1943 the division participated in the Battle of Mareth and subsequent fighting in the Tunisian Campaign culminating in the capture of Tunis in May.

=== Italy ===
1st Armoured Division was non-operational for a year, until it was shipped to the Italian Front at the end of May 1944 (Divisional HQ was transported by air). It concentrated at Altamura near Bari and was brought up to take part in the battle for the Gothic Line in August. The division was recognised as a weak element in the plan: Divisional HQ had not commanded in action for over a year, and its subordinate brigades had been assembled piecemeal. Nevertheless, it was selected for an important role in Operation Olive, making an attack on Coriano. The division's axis of advance was up bad mountain tracks and the German defence was strong: the attack on 4 September was a failure, and progress the following day was slow. A second attack (the Second Battle of Coriano) began on the afternoon of 13 September and the division forced its way through to Ceriano Ridge, which was captured on 18/19 September. Further progress was halted by heavy rain.

Casualties among the division's infantry had been heavy and reinforcements were scarce at this stage of the war, so the decision was made to break up 1st Armoured Division. Divisional HQ was used to command an ad hoc group of units to screen the assembly of II Polish Corps at the front by 28 October. After that, Divisional HQ had no formations under its command and its last remaining unit, 1st Armoured Divisional Signals, was disbanded on 7 December 1944. No 1 Squadron was converted into a Line of Communication company, some of the personnel remained attached to their brigades and units, many of the rest were transferred to 6th Armoured Division.

=== Organisation ===
The organisation of an armoured divisional signal unit in late World War II was as follows:

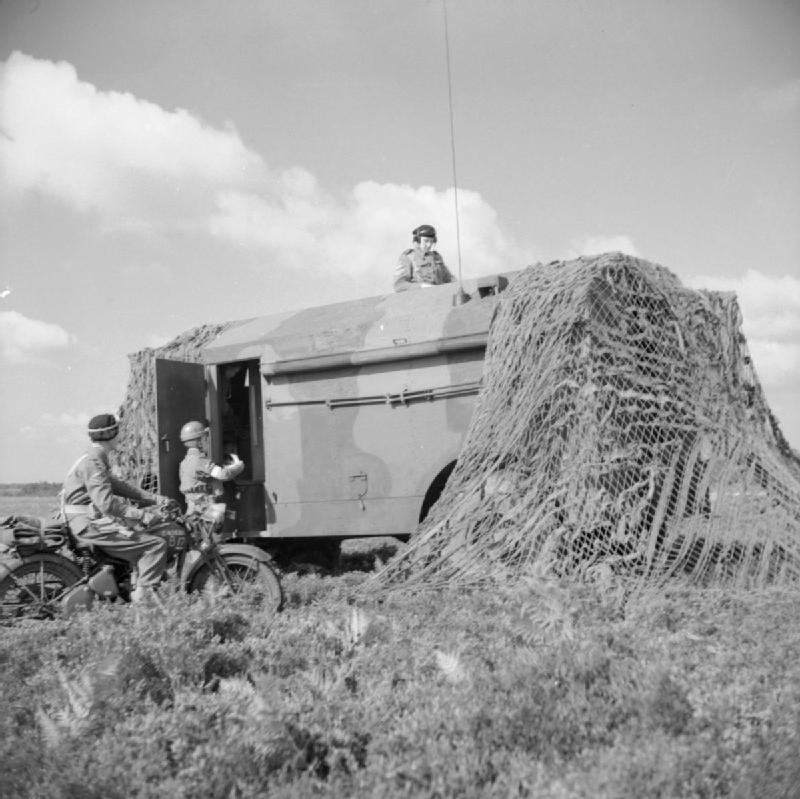
An AEC armoured command vehicle and despatch riders of the Royal Corps of Signals at the divisional HQ of an armoured division on exercise in the UK, August 1941.

- HQ Squadron
  - M and Q Troops
- 1 Squadron – attached to divisional HQ
  - Advanced Group
  - A Troop – attached to divisional HQ
  - C Troop – radio troop
  - D Troop – messenger troop
  - Rear Group
  - U Troop – attached to rear divisional HQ
  - B Troop – line troop
  - O Troop – operating troop
- 2 Squadron – attached to divisional artillery
  - H Troop – attached to divisional artillery HQ
  - E and F Troops – attached to individual artillery regiments
- 3 Squadron
  - J Troop – attached to infantry brigade
  - R Troop – attached to divisional reconnaissance regiment
  - N Troop – attached to divisional engineers
- 4 Squadron – attached to armoured brigade
  - W Troop – attached to armoured brigade HQ
  - V Troop – attached to armoured brigade motor battalion
  - X, Y, Z Troops – attached to individual armoured regiments

== Later units ==
In July 1946, while stationed in Trieste, 6th Armoured Division was redesignated 1st Armoured Division and its signal unit became 1st Armoured Divisional Signal Regiment; it went to Palestine in 1947 but disbanded in September that year.

In April 1978, 1st Division in British Army of the Rhine was converted to the armoured role and 1 Signal Regiment became 1st (UK) Armoured Division HQ and Signal Regiment.

== Commanding Officers ==
The Commanding Officers of the unit include the following:

Armoured Fighting Vehicle Signals

- Major J.R. Carter, OBE, 1930
- Major (later Lt-Col) A.C. Sykes, DSO, OBE, 1931

1st Tank Brigade Signals

- Major F.A.H. Mathew, OBE, MC, 1937

Mobile Divisional Signals

- Lt-Col F.S. Straight, MC, 1937

1st Armoured Divisional Signals

- Lt-Col F.S. Straight, MC, 1939
- Lt-Col M. Duncan
- Lt-Col M.S, Wheatley
- Lt-Col W.P. Doyle
- Lt-Col W.R. Smith-Windham, DSO
- Lt-Col P.A. Duke
- Lt-Col F.W.P. Bradford, MBE
- Lt-Col L.C.C. Harrison, MC

== External sources ==
- The Long, Long Trail
- Unit Histories
- Niehorster.org
