= Cavalry Corps (United Kingdom) =

- Active: October 1914 – March 1916; September 1916 – 1919
- Country: United Kingdom
- Branch: British Army
- Type: Cavalry
- Size: Corps
- Part of: British Expeditionary Force
- Engagements: First World War Western Front

Commanders
- Notable commanders: Edmund Allenby

The Cavalry Corps was a cavalry corps of the British Army in the First World War. The corps was formed in France in October 1914, under General Sir Edmund Allenby. It was later broken up in March 1916, but re-established in the following September. It served as part of the British Expeditionary Force on the Western Front throughout its existence.

== Formation ==
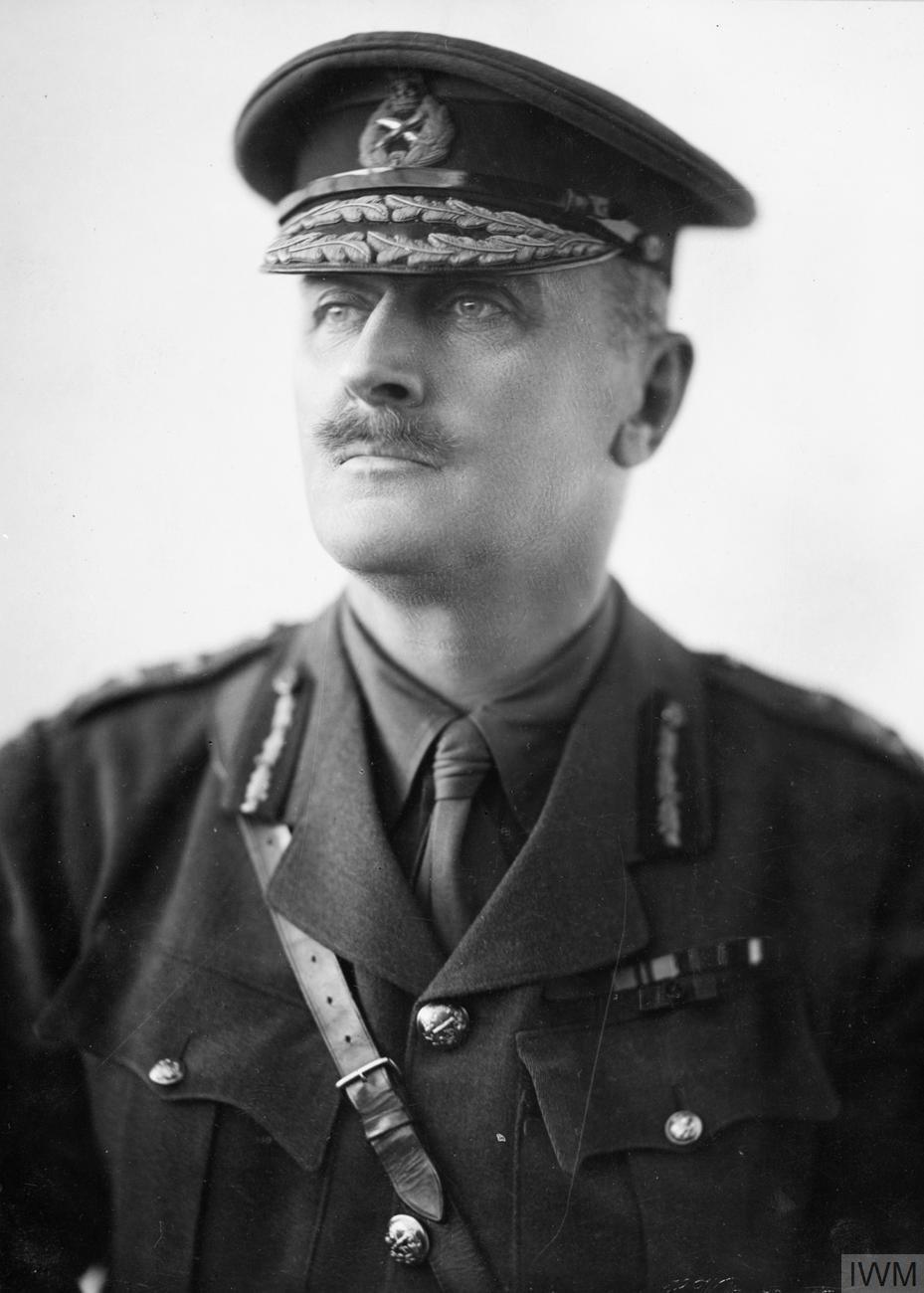
Edmund Allenby, the first commander

The Corps consisted of the three cavalry divisions serving in France, the 1st, 2nd, 3rd divisions.

The cavalry division consisted of cavalry regiments in brigades. They were armed with rifles, unlike their French and German counterparts, who were only armed with the shorter range carbine. The cavalry division also had a high allocation of artillery compared to foreign cavalry divisions, with 24 13-pounder guns organised into two brigades and two machine guns for each regiment. However, when dismounted, the cavalry division was the equivalent of two weakened infantry brigades with less artillery than the infantry division.

== Battles ==
- Battle of La Bassee
- Battle of Messines (1914)
- Battle of Arras (1914)
- Battle of Cambrai (1917)
- The Battles of the Hindenburg Line

== Commanders ==
Rank	Name	Dates	Notes	Ref.
Lieutenant-General	E. H. H. Allenby	10 October 1914 – 19 April 1915	Sick 19/4/15	
Major-General	Hon. Sir J. H. G. Byng	19 April – 4 May 1915	Acting	
Lieutenant-General	E. H. H. Allenby	4–7 May 1915		
Lieutenant-General	Hon. Sir J. H. G. Byng	7 May – 16 August 1915		
Lieutenant-General	H. D. Fanshawe	16 August – 23 October 1915		
Lieutenant-General	Hon. C. E. Bingham	23 October 1915 – 12 March 1916		
Lieutenant-General	C. T. McM. Kavanagh	4 September 1916 – 1919		

== See also ==
- British Army during World War I
- British Cavalry Corps order of battle 1914
- British cavalry during the First World War

== Bibliography ==
- Badsey, Stephen (2008). Doctrine and Reform in the British Cavalry 1880-1918. Aldershot: Ashgate Publishing. ISBN 978-0-7546-6467-3.
- Becke, Archibald F. (1945). Order of Battle of Divisions Part 4. The Army Council, G.H.Q.s, Armies and Corps, 1914-1919. London: HMSO. OCLC 4405016.
- Gudmundsson, Bruce I.; Anderson, Duncan (2007). The British Army on the Western Front 1916. Oxford: Osprey Publishing. ISBN 978-1-84603-111-3.
