= 2nd Cavalry Brigade (United Kingdom) =

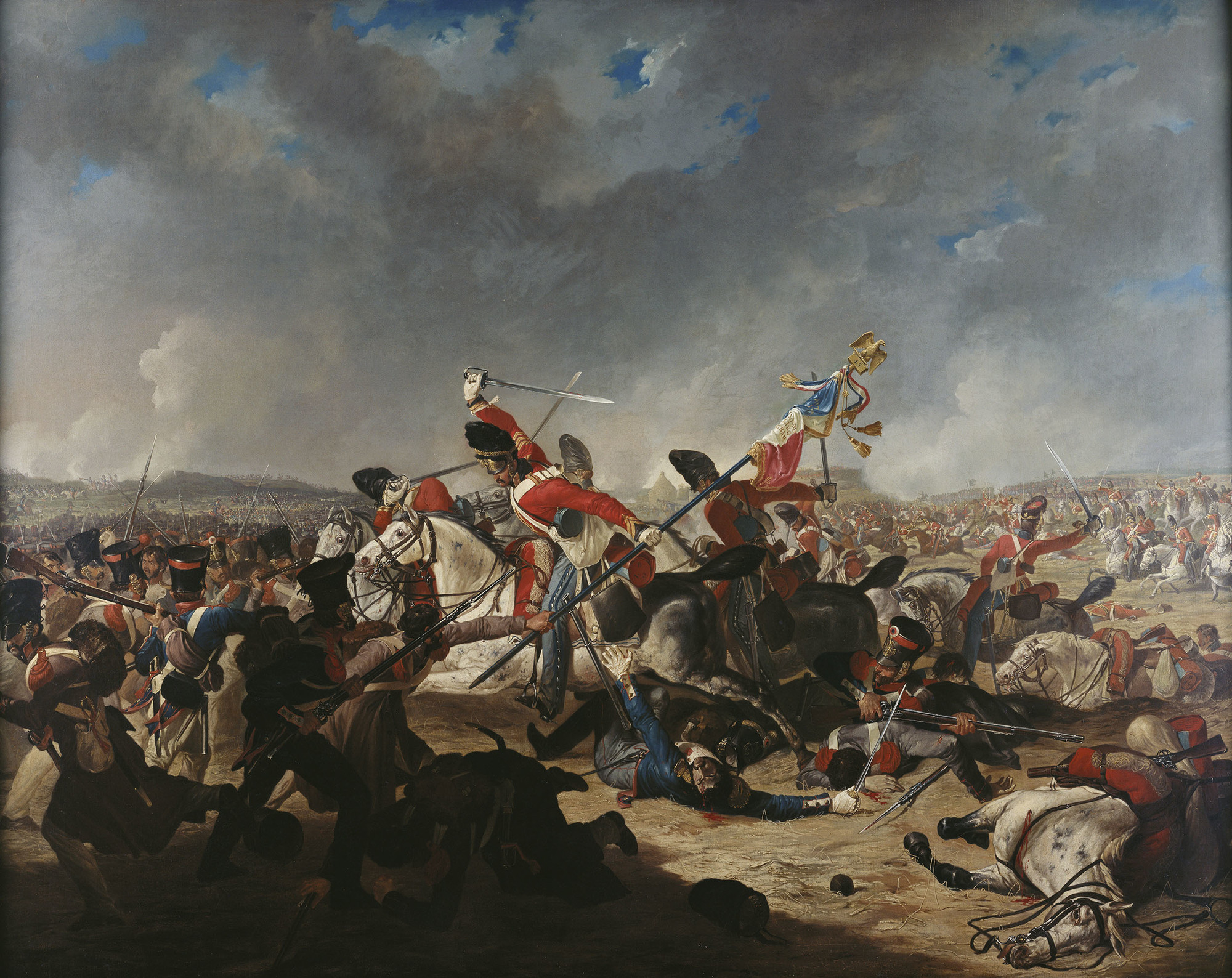
- c. 1816 painting of the brigade at Waterloo by Denis Dighton
- Active: 1815; 1899–1902; 1914–1919
- Country: United Kingdom
- Branch: British Army
- Type: Cavalry
- Size: Brigade
- Part of: 1st Cavalry Division (World War I)
- Engagements: Napoleonic Wars Battle of Waterloo Second Boer War Battle of Paardeberg World War I Western Front

Commanders
- Notable commanders: Sir William Ponsonby; John French, 1st Earl of Ypres; Cecil Edward Bingham; Beauvoir De Lisle

The 2nd Cavalry Brigade was a brigade of the British Army. It served in the Napoleonic Wars (2nd Union Cavalry Brigade), the Boer War and in the First World War when it was assigned to the 1st Cavalry Division.

Prior to World War I the brigade was based at Tidworth Camp in England; and originally consisted of three cavalry regiments and a Royal Engineers signal troop. After the declaration of war in August 1914, the brigade was deployed to the Western Front in France, where an artillery battery joined the brigade the following September and a Machine Gun Squadron in February 1916.

== History ==
=== Napoleonic Wars ===
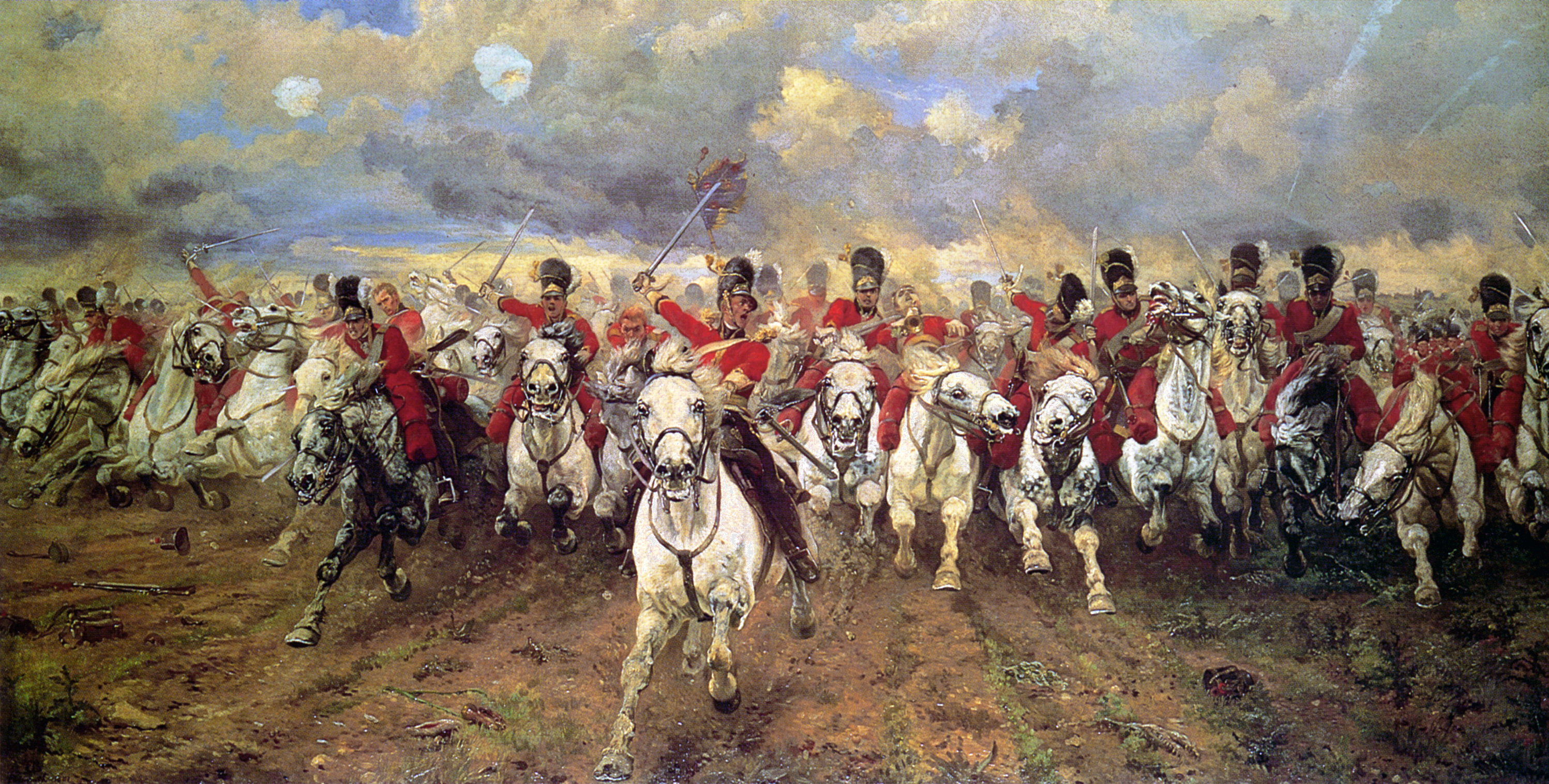
1881 artist’s impression of the charge of the Royal Scots Greys at Waterloo in 1815.

From June 1809, Wellington organized his cavalry into one, later two, cavalry divisions (1st and 2nd) for the Peninsular War. These performed a purely administrative, rather than tactical, role; the normal tactical headquarters were provided by brigades commanding two, later usually three, regiments. The cavalry brigades were named for the commanding officer, rather than numbered. (Note: This could be a source of confusion as brigades acquired new commanders, or they moved between brigades. For example, Fane's Brigade became De Grey's Brigade from 13 May 1810 when Henry Fane went to Estremadura; De Grey's Brigade was broken up 29 January 1812. On 20 May 1813, Fane took over Slade's Brigade; the second Fane's Brigade was unrelated to the original one although coincidentally, and to add to the potential confusion, the 3rd Dragoon Guards served in both.) For the Hundred Days Campaign, he numbered his British cavalry brigades in a single sequence, 1st to 7th. (Note: The British cavalry included five regiments of the King's German Legion.) The 2nd Cavalry Brigade consisted of:

- 1st (Royal) Regiment of Dragoons
- 2nd Regiment of Dragoons (Royal Scots Greys)
- 6th (Inniskilling) Dragoons

As the brigade consisted of regiments from England (1st Dragoons), Scotland (2nd Dragoons) and Ireland (6th Dragoons), it was known as the 2nd (Union) Cavalry Brigade.

=== Boer War ===
The brigade was reformed for the Boer War. During the Battle of Paardeberg, the brigade commanded:

- 6th Dragoon Guards (Carabiners)
- 2nd Dragoons (Royal Scots Greys)
- 6th (Inniskilling) Dragoons
- New Zealanders
- Australians
- G and P Batteries, Royal Horse Artillery

=== World War I ===
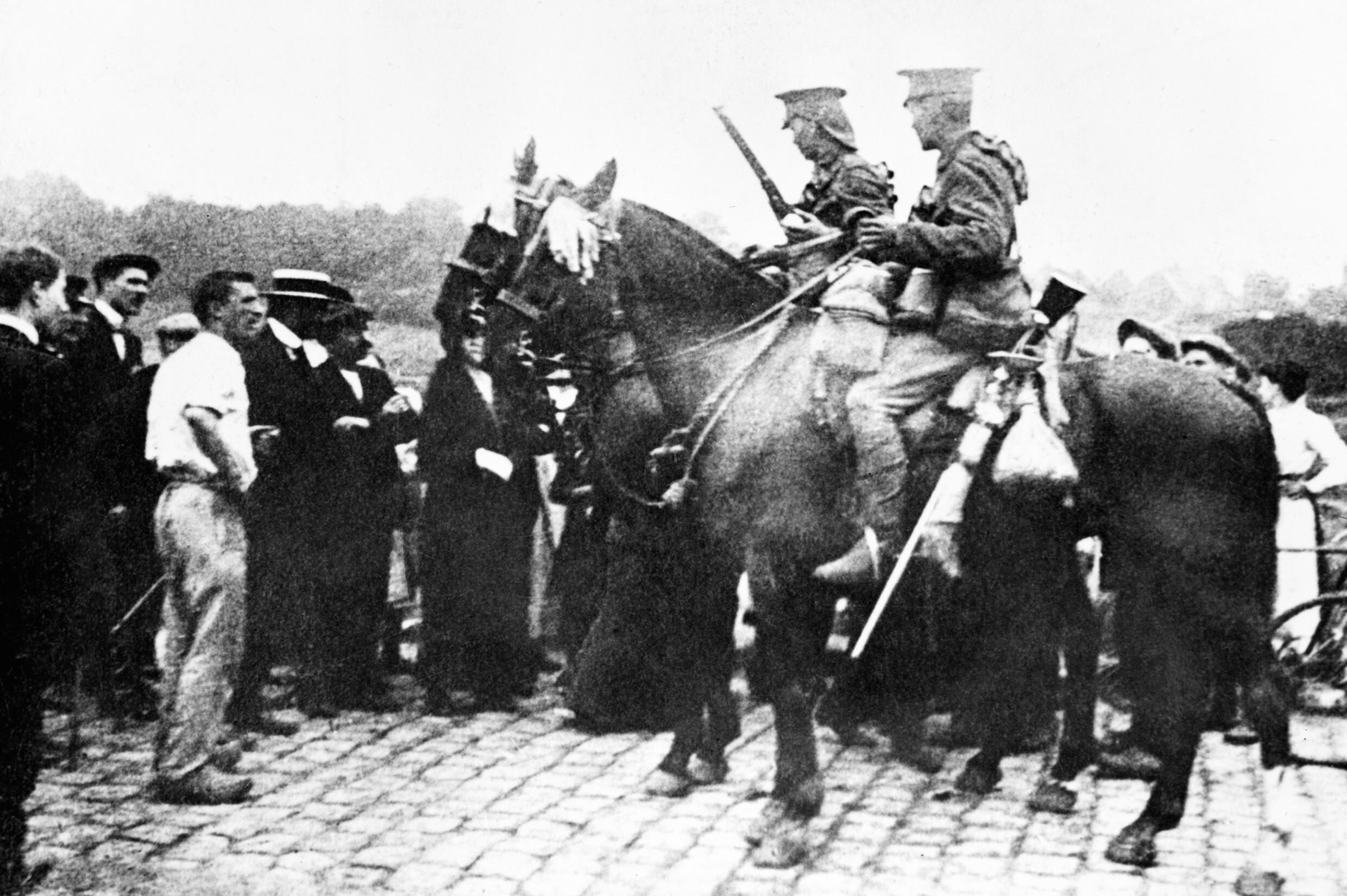
A patrol of the 18th Hussars attempting to obtain information from the local population, 21 August 1914.

- 4th (Royal Irish) Dragoon Guards
- 9th (Queen’s Royal) Lancers
- 18th (Queen Mary’s Own) Hussars
- 2nd Signal Troop, Royal Engineers
- H Battery, Royal Horse Artillery from 28 September 1914
- 2nd Cavalry Brigade Machine Gun Squadron Machine Gun Corps

==== Commanders ====
The commanders of the 2nd Cavalry Brigade during the First World War were:

- Brigadier-General H. de B. de Lisle (At mobilization)
- Brigadier-General R. L. Mullens (12 October 1914)
- Brigadier-General D. J. E. Beale-Browne (26 October 1915)
- Brigadier-General A. Lawson (16 April 1918)

== See also ==
- Order of battle of the Waterloo Campaign
- British Army during World War I
- British Cavalry Corps order of battle 1914
- British cavalry during the First World War

== Bibliography ==
- Becke, Major A.F. (1989). Order of Battle of Divisions Part 1. The Regular British Divisions (Reprint ed.). London: His Majesty's Stationery Office. ISBN 1-871167-09-4.
- Clarke, W.G. (1993). Horse Gunners: The Royal Horse Artillery, 200 Years of Panache and Professionalism. Woolwich: The Royal Artillery Institution. ISBN 09520762-0-9.
- Haythornthwaite, Philip J. (1990). The Napoleonic Source Book. London: Guild Publishing.
- Reid, Stuart (2004). Wellington's Army in the Peninsula 1809–14. Vol. 2 of Battle Orders Series. Oxford: Osprey Publishing. ISBN 1-84176-517-1.
- Smith, Digby (1998). The Greenhill Napoleonic Wars Data Book. London: Greenhill Books. ISBN 1-85367-276-9.
