= Jan Smuts in the Boer War =

South African statesman and military leader

Jan Christiaan Smuts, OM (24 May 1870 – 11 September 1950) was a prominent South African and Commonwealth statesman and military leader. He served as a Boer general during the Boer War, a British general during the First World War and was appointed field marshal during the Second World War. In addition to various cabinet appointments, he served as prime minister of the Union of South Africa from 1919 to 1924 and from 1939 to 1948. He played a leading part in the post war settlements at the end of both world wars, making significant contributions towards the creation of both the League of Nations and the United Nations.

Smuts has a role in the Second Boer War, from the outbreak of war in 1899 until the Treaty of Vereeniging in 1902. In the disastrous early stages, Smuts served in Pretoria, far behind the front line. Necessity soon thrust Smuts into the guerrilla campaign that followed. To him was entrusted the responsibility of infiltrating the Cape Colony, and persuading the Afrikaners there to stir up trouble. Although this failed, the United Kingdom soon came to the negotiating table, whereupon the two sides reached a compromise, negotiated by Smuts.

== Onset of war ==
On 11 October 1899, the two Boer republics declared war on the United Kingdom. Immediately, commandos armed with German rifles and artillery and trained by the best European officers, marched into Natal and the Cape Colony. The hawkish Smuts, though, saw no service in the early stages of the war. His battlefield was Pretoria, where he served as President Paul Kruger's right-hand man. He wrote dispatches to generals, published propaganda, organised logistics, and liaised with Transvaal diplomats in Europe.

After the defeats inflicted upon the Boer forces at Ladysmith, Mafeking, and Paardeberg, the British forces, considerably outnumbering the Boers, flooded across the Orange River, and into the republics. The government of the Transvaal fled from Pretoria to convene in Machadodorp. These reverses hardened Smuts' resolve. He ordered the destruction of the gold mines, which he saw as the only British objectives, but this action was blocked by a local judge. Smuts raised an army of 500 men as quickly as he could, and demanded the banks be emptied and their reserves be placed on a train for Machadodorp. The train carrying Smuts, his soldiers, and all the Transvaal's gold was the last to leave Pretoria before the town fell, only hours later, to the British Army.

With every Boer town in the hands of the British, President Kruger in exile in the Netherlands, and formal resistance at an end, the British extended an offer of peace to the Boers. Acting in the name of Kruger, Smuts rejected the terms, and urged the generals to fight on. He described to Louis Botha a manner of guerrilla warfare, which would be suited to the vast expanses of the Veldt. Botha, Barry Hertzog, Christiaan de Wet, and Koos de la Rey each commanded commando forces to raid the British positions across South Africa.

Smuts served with de la Rey, raiding British supply trains across the western Transvaal. He soon proved himself to be an excellent soldier, and was acutely aware of the strengths and limitations of their small force. The small force of 500 men evaded an army forty times its size, and severely weakened the supply lines of the entire British Army in South Africa. These successes were small, though, in the scale of the conflict. Whereas de la Rey and Smuts were wildly successful in their region, Botha and Hertzog (leading the two largest armies) found it difficult to replicate the tactics and success of their compatriots. Gradually, the British built a system of forts, internment camps, and armed patrols, and divided the country with barbed wire and trenches.

As it became harder to evade their armies, the Boers ran out of success. The generals met in secret and discussed peace. Botha and Smuts decided that they had greatly underestimated the resolve of the British politicians, and sent a telegram to Kruger to ask for his advice. He responded, without the full knowledge of the dire situation in which the Boers found themselves, to fight on. The Orange Free State's two representatives, Steyn and de Wet, derided the suggestion of peace. In the end, they resolved to launch one last attack, and turn the conflict on its head. Smuts was chosen to lead the operation.

== Raid on the Cape ==
The plan asked for Smuts to stealthily lead an army of 340 men into the Cape Colony. From there, he would attempt to draw support from the Afrikaners of the Cape, and instigate a general rebellion against the British government in Cape Town. For Smuts, just getting near British territory would be difficult, as Kitchener had recently launched a major campaign to rid the Orange Free State of commandos, and, especially, of Smuts. He had escaped capture by the British no fewer than a dozen times, and his forces rendezvoused on the border after a month, with only 240 men left.

Once in the Cape Colony, Smuts' raiders were cut off from their homeland. They were harried by Briton and Basuto alike, and were weakened by disease and starvation. Those who were most severely wounded or sick were left to be captured by the British. The men turned against Smuts, but he urged them onward, optimistic that the tide would turn. It did so when they encountered a cavalry squadron at camp, and ambushed them, taking their horses, food, uniforms, guns, ammunition, and luxuries, raising the spirits of the men. For the next few months, the raid was highly successful in distracting and tiring the British.

For all this, the aim of the raid was never to distract and tire, but to incite an insurrection of the population. Despite their success at distracting and disrupting, hardly a single local nationalist Afrikaner took up arms against the British, and Smuts realised that these small raids would succeed in achieving such a grand objective. In fact, many western cape nationalist Afrikaners supported the British. Smuts decided to establish a headquarters and command as if he were the head of an army. He made the Hex River Valley his home, and sent his men far and wide to enlist and to forage. Soon his army numbered three thousand, mostly local Boer farmers.

To draw out British forces, Smuts sought to take a major target, the copper-mining town of Okiep in the present-day Northern Cape Province (April–May 1902), which he laid under siege. Events in the Transvaal overtook the siege before it was resolved: in late April a dispatch from Lord Kitchener reached Smuts, inviting him to the peace conference at Veeringen. Smuts agreed a truce and with the garrison and departed to attend the peace negotiations. In his absence Manie Maritz attempted to break the truce take the town with a train packed full of explosives. This effort failed when the train derailed outside of the town and its deadly cargo burnt off harmlessly.

== The Treaty of Vereeniging ==
To Vereeniging, the South African Republic and the Orange Free State sent thirty delegates each to meet the British. Whereas the Transvaal and the Orange Free State had been ravaged by the war equally as thoroughly, only the Transvaal delegates wanted peace. The Boer commandos knew that President Steyn, General de Wet, Hertzog, and the 27 other Free State delegates would rather fight to the death than sign a treaty of surrender. Thus, when they elected the representatives of the Transvaal, they chose men of peace, and not war heroes. Smuts was not elected, but Louis Botha appointed him to be the chief legal advisor to the Transvaal delegation.

During the debates, Smuts used his knowledge of both military and legal aspects, of government, and of academia, to guide the delegation. His mastery of English, Afrikaans, and Dutch allowed him to speak before others, and, unlike at Bloemfontein, no one spoke over him. Smuts' dominance allowed the doves' sentiments in the Transvaal delegation to win. Francis William Reitz, tabled a compromise, ending the war, allowing the two republics limited sovereignty, and calling for slimmed-down delegations to meet in Pretoria to negotiate with the British. Reitz knew that the British would reject the proposal, but he also knew that the greatest stumbling block to a resolution wasn't the deputation from London, but that from Bloemfontein. Thus, the Transvaal needed to buy time, with smaller parties involved, to negotiate fully with the Free State representatives.

At Pretoria, the British deputation was led by Baron Kitchener and Baron Milner, who were of significantly different opinions. Smuts and Kitchener had mutual professional respect, and talked alone, avoiding the interjection of administrators, such as Milner. Moreover, both Kitchener and Smuts had seen the futility of the war. Bilaterally, Smuts and Kitchener negotiated a settlement that suited the Free State representative, de Wet.

On 31 May 1902, the Treaty of Vereeniging, a document that was mostly written by Smuts and Lord Kitchener on their own, was signed by representatives of the United Kingdom, the Orange Free State, and the South African Republic. This provided for the end of hostilities and eventual self-government to the Transvaal (South African Republic) and the Orange Free State as British colonies. The Boer republics agreed to come under the sovereignty of the British Crown and the British government agreed on various details.
