= 8th Cavalry Brigade (United Kingdom) =

- Active: 1914–1918
- Country: United Kingdom
- Branch: British Army
- Type: Cavalry
- Size: Brigade
- Part of: 3rd Cavalry Division
- Engagements: World War I Western Front

The 8th Cavalry Brigade was a cavalry brigade of the British Army in World War I. It was formed in Belgium in 1914 and served on the Western Front as part of the 3rd Cavalry Division. It left the 3rd Cavalry Division on 14 March 1918.

== World War I ==
=== Formation ===
The 3rd Cavalry Division began forming at Ludgershall, Wiltshire in September 1914 with just two cavalry brigades (the 6th and the 7th). To bring the division up to the standard strength of three brigades, the 8th Cavalry Brigade was formed in Belgium on 20 November 1914. With the addition of its third brigade, 3rd Cavalry Division obtained a third Cavalry Field Ambulance (8th, from England on 23 December) and a third Mobile Veterinary Section (20th, from England on 9 March 1915).

The brigade was initially formed with the 10th Royal Hussars from 6th Cavalry Brigade (Note: 10th Hussars was replaced in 6th Cavalry Brigade with the 1/1st North Somerset Yeomanry from 1st South Western Mounted Brigade in England.) and the Royal Horse Guards from 7th Cavalry Brigade (Note: Royal Horse Guards was replaced in 7th Cavalry Brigade with the 1/1st Leicestershire Yeomanry from North Midland Mounted Brigade in England.) on 20 November. The third regiment, the 1/1st Essex Yeomanry, did not join from the Eastern Mounted Brigade in England until 11 December. A signal troop joined on formation and G Battery, Royal Horse Artillery (six 13 pounders) joined from V Brigade, RHA of 8th Infantry Division on 25 November. On 29 February 1916, a Machine Gun Squadron was formed from the machine gun sections of the brigade's constituent regiments.

=== Chronicle ===
The brigade served with the 3rd Cavalry Division on the Western Front until March 1918. It joined the division too late to take part in any of the 1914 actions, but in 1915 the division saw action in the Second Battle of Ypres (Battle of Frezenberg Ridge, 11–13 May) and the Battle of Loos (26–28 September). 1916 saw no notable actions, but in 1917 the division took part in the Battle of Arras (First Battle of the Scarpe, 9–12 April). At other times, the brigade formed a dismounted unit and served in the trenches (as a regiment under the command of the brigadier).

In March 1918, the 4th (formerly 1st Indian) and 5th (formerly 2nd Indian) Cavalry Divisions were broken up in France. The Indian elements were sent to Egypt where they formed part of the new 4th and 5th Cavalry Divisions which played a major part in the successful conclusion of the Sinai and Palestine Campaign. The British and Canadian units remained in France and most of them were transferred to the 3rd Cavalry Division causing it to be extensively reorganized.

The yeomanry regiments were concentrated in the 8th Cavalry Brigade; it left the 3rd Cavalry Division on 14 March 1918, the day after the Canadian Cavalry Brigade joined from 5th Cavalry Division. It appears to have been dissolved at this point as the constituent regiments (the Essex, Leicestershire and North Somerset Yeomanry) were slated to be converted to cyclist units, G Battery, RHA was posted to XVII Brigade, RHA, and 8th MG Squadron joined 7th Cavalry Brigade.

=== Units ===
Unit	From	To
Royal Horse Guards	20 November 1914	7 November 1917 (Note: Royal Horse Guards returned to 7th Cavalry Brigade in exchange for the 1/1st Leicestershire Yeomanry.)
10th (Prince Of Wales’s Own Royal) Hussars	20 November 1914	12 March 1918 (Note: 10th Hussars returned to 6th Cavalry Brigade in exchange for the 1/1st North Somerset Yeomanry.)
1/1st Essex Yeomanry	11 December 1914	14 March 1918 (Note: 1/1st Essex Yeomanry left to become a cyclist unit, then to form a machine gun battalion with the 1/1st Bedfordshire Yeomanry. The German spring offensive forestalled this plan, and the regiment was remounted on 28 March and sent to the 1st Cavalry Division. From 4 April it was split up with a squadron joining each regiment in 1st Cavalry Brigade (2nd Dragoon Guards, 5th Dragoon Guards and 11th Hussars).)
1/1st Leicestershire Yeomanry	7 November 1917	14 March 1918 (Note: 1/1st Leicestershire Yeomanry left to become a cyclist unit, then to form a machine gun battalion with the 1/1st North Somerset Yeomanry. This plan was cancelled and the regiment was remounted and sent to the 1st Cavalry Division. From 4 April it was split up with a squadron joining each regiment in 3rd Cavalry Brigade (4th Hussars, 5th Lancers and 16th Lancers).)
1/1st North Somerset Yeomanry	13 March 1918	14 March 1918 (Note: 1/1st North Somerset Yeomanry left to become a cyclist unit, then to form a machine gun battalion with the 1/1st Leicestershire Yeomanry. The regiment was remounted and returned to the 3rd Cavalry Division. From April it was split up with a squadron joining each regiment in 6th Cavalry Brigade (3rd Dragoon Guards, 1st Dragoons and 10th Hussars).)
G Battery, RHA	25 November 1914	13 March 1918 (Note: G Battery, Royal Horse Artillery was posted to XVII Brigade, RHA.)
8th Signal Troop Royal Engineers	20 November 1914	
8th Cavalry Brigade Machine Gun Squadron, MGC	29 February 1916	11 March 1918 (Note: 8th Cavalry Brigade Machine Gun Squadron transferred to the reconstituted 7th Cavalry Brigade. Redesignated 7th Cavalry Brigade Machine Gun Squadron on 4 May 1918.)

== Commanders ==
The 8th Cavalry Brigade had the following commanders:

From	Rank	Name
23 November 1914	Brigadier-General	C.B. Bulkeley-Johnson (killed, 11 April 1917)
11 April 1917	Lieutenant-Colonel	Lord Tweedmouth (acting)
14 April 1917	Brigadier-General	A.G. Seymour

== See also ==
- British Army during World War I
- British Cavalry Corps order of battle 1914
- British cavalry during the First World War

== Bibliography ==
- Becke, Archibald F. (1935). Order of Battle of Divisions Part 1–The Regular British Divisions. London: HMSO. OCLC 4405016.
- Frederick, J.B.M. (1984). Lineage Book of British Land Forces 1660-1978. Wakefield, Yorkshire: Microform Academic Publishers. ISBN 1-85117-009-X.
- James, Brigadier E.A. (1978). British Regiments 1914–18. London: Samson Books Limited. ISBN 0-906304-03-2.
- Perry, F.W. (1993). Order of Battle of Divisions Part 5B. Indian Army Divisions. Newport: Ray Westlake Military Books. ISBN 1-871167-23-X.
