= 1st Cavalry Division (United Kingdom) =

World War-era British Army formation

- First World War division insignia
- Active: August 1914 – March 1919; 31 October 1940 – 1 August 1941
- Country: United Kingdom
- Allegiance: British Crown
- Branch: British Army
- Type: Cavalry
- Size: Division Second World War 11,097 men 6,081 horses 1,815 vehicles (Note: These figures comprise the war establishment, the on-paper strength, of the division.)
- Part of: Cavalry Corps (First World War)
- Engagements: First World War Battle of Mons (1914) Action of Elouges Rearguard Action of Solesmes Battle of Le Cateau Rearguard Affair of Etreux Affair of Nery Rearguard Actions of Villers-Cotterets Battle of the Marne Battle of the Aisne Actions on the Aisne Heights First Battle of Ypres 1914 Second Battle of Ypres 1915 Battle of Flers-Courcelette 1916 Battle of Arras 1917 Battle of Cambrai 1917 First Battle of the Somme 1918 Battle of Amiens 1918 Second Battle of the Somme 1918 Hindenburg Line 1918 Final Advance in Artois Final Advance in Picardy Second World War Anglo-Iraqi War Syria–Lebanon campaign

Commanders
- Notable commanders: Edmund Allenby, 1st Viscount Allenby

The 1st Cavalry Division was a regular Division of the British Army during the First World War where it fought on the Western Front. During the Second World War it was a first line formation, formed from Yeomanry Regiments. It fought in the Middle East before being converted to the 10th Armoured Division.

== Napoleonic Wars ==
During the Peninsular War, Wellington organized his cavalry into The Cavalry Division from June 1809 under Major-General Sir William Payne. This performed a purely administrative, rather than tactical, role; the normal tactical headquarters were provided by brigades commanding two, later usually three, regiments. On 3 June 1810, Payne returned home and his second-in-command, Major-General Stapleton Cotton, took command. Cotton was to remain in command thereafter and effectively acted as Wellington's chief of cavalry.

On 19 June 1811, the cavalry was reorganized as two divisions and The Cavalry Division was redesignated as 1st Cavalry Division with the formation of the 2nd Cavalry Division. The divisions were once again amalgamated as The Cavalry Division on 21 April 1813 with Cotton (Lieutenant-General from 1 January 1812) still in command.

== Second Boer War ==
The Cavalry Division was re-raised for service during the Second Boer War.

== First World War ==
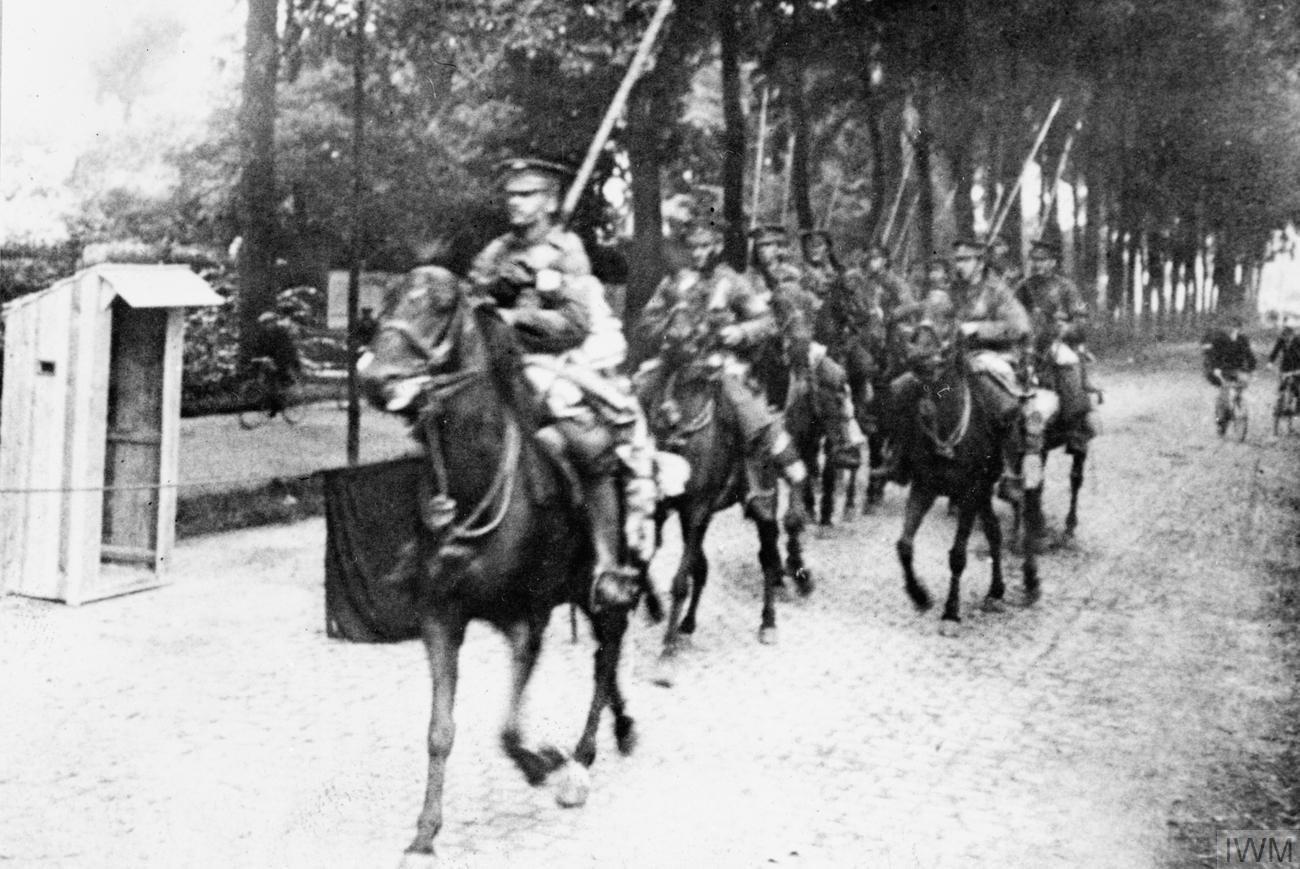
The 9th Lancers arriving at Mons, 21 August 1914.

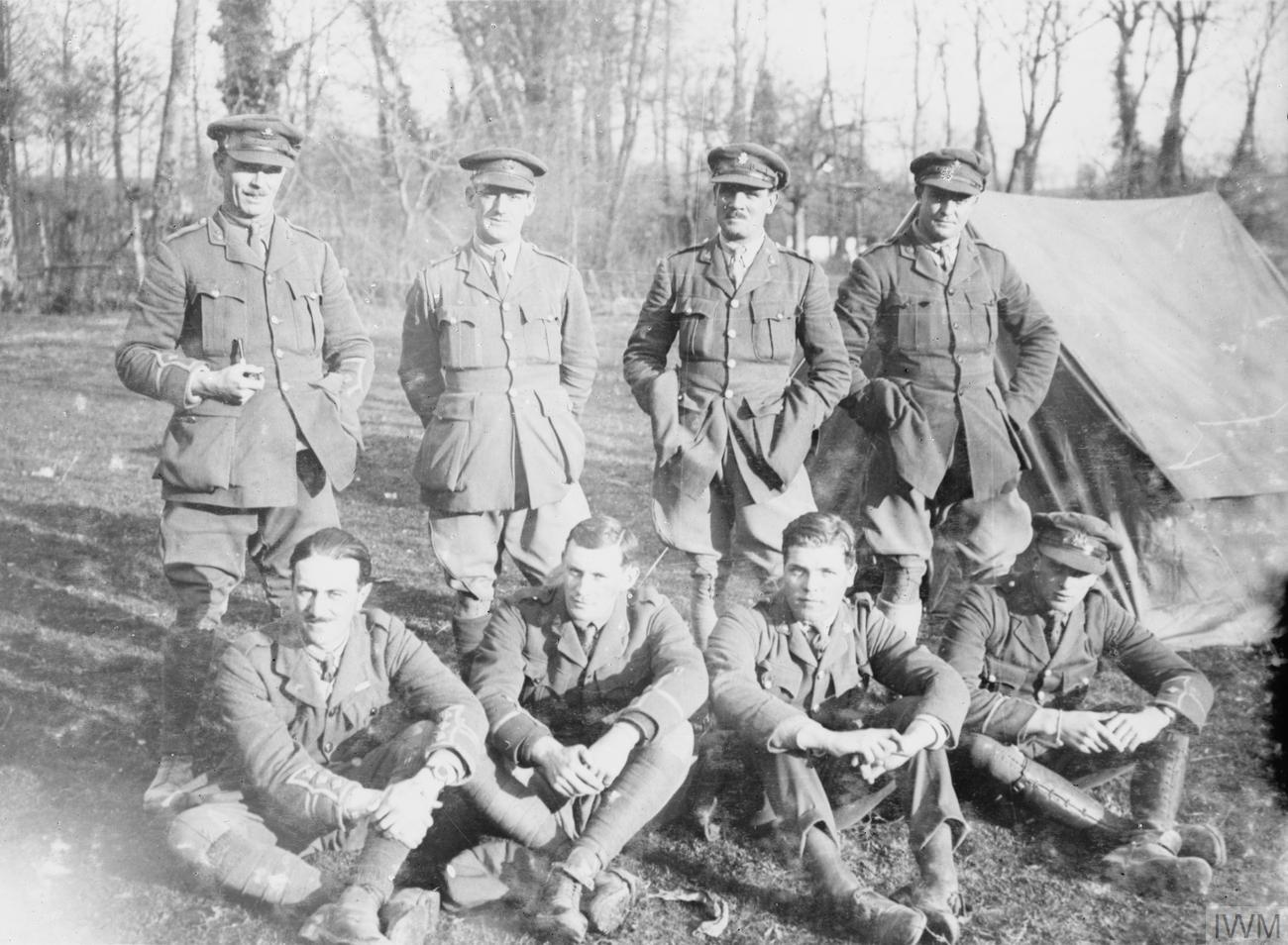
Officers of the 5th Dragoon Guards in their camp at Rollancourt, May 1917.

The 1st Cavalry Division was one of the first divisions of the army to move to France in August 1914, they would remain on the Western Front as part of the British Expeditionary Force (BEF) throughout the war. It participated in most of the major actions where cavalry were used as a mounted mobile force, they would also be used as dismounted troops and effectively serve as infantry.

On 11 November 1918, the day of the armistice with Germany, orders were received that the division would lead the advance of the Second Army of the BEF into Germany, by 6 December, having passed through Namur, the division secured the Rhine bridgehead at Cologne.

== Order of battle in the First World War ==
=== 1st Cavalry Brigade ===
2nd Dragoon Guards
5th Dragoon Guards
11th Hussars
1st Signal Troop, Royal Engineers
1st Cavalry Brigade Machine Gun Squadron (from February 1916)

=== 2nd Cavalry Brigade ===
4th Dragoon Guards
9th Lancers
18th Hussars
2nd Signal Troop, Royal Engineers
2nd Cavalry Brigade Machine Gun Squadron (from 28 February 1916)

=== 9th Cavalry Brigade ===
9th Cavalry Brigade was formed in France on 14 April 1915 with the 15th Hussars and the 19th Hussars. These regular cavalry regiments had been serving on the Western Front since August 1914 as divisional cavalry squadrons assigned to infantry divisions. The brigade remained with 1st Cavalry Division for the rest of the war.

Unit	From	To
15th (The King's) Hussars	14 April 1915	
19th (Queen Alexandra's Own Royal) Hussars	14 April 1915	
1/1st Bedfordshire Yeomanry	12 June 1915	10 March 1918
1/1st Bedfordshire Yeomanry	April 1918 (Note: 1/1st Bedfordshire Yeomanry left to become a cyclist unit, then to form a machine gun battalion with the 1/1st Essex Yeomanry. The German spring offensive forestalled this plan, and the regiment was remounted and returned to 1st Cavalry Division. From April 1918 it was split up with a squadron joining each regiment in 9th Cavalry Brigade (8th, 15th and 19th Hussars).)	
8th (The King's Royal Irish) Hussars	10 March 1918 (Note: 8th Hussars joined from 3rd (Ambala) Cavalry Brigade of the 5th Cavalry Division after it was broken up. On 11 March it came on the British War Establishment i.e. the 4th squadron was absorbed into the others.)	
1/1st Warwickshire Battery, RHA (TF)	14 April 1915	21 November 1916 (Note: 1/1st Warwickshire Battery, RHA transferred to XV Brigade, Royal Horse Artillery in 29th Division in exchange for Y Battery, RHA.)
Y Battery, RHA	1 December 1916	
9th Signal Troop, Royal Engineers	14 April 1915	
9th Cavalry Brigade Machine Gun Squadron, MGC	28 February 1916 (Note: 9th Cavalry Brigade Machine Gun Squadron was formed from the machine gun sections of the brigade's constituent regiments.)	

=== Cavalry Divisional troops ===
III Brigade, Royal Horse Artillery transferred to 2nd Cavalry Division on formation on 17 September 1914

D Battery, RHA
E Battery, RHA
III RHA Brigade Ammunition Column

VII Brigade, Royal Horse Artillery

I Battery, RHA attached to 1st Cavalry Brigade from 17 September 1914
L Battery, RHA withdrawn after Action at Néry on 1 September 1914
(Tempy) Z Battery, RHA from 1 to 27 September 1914
H Battery, RHA from 28 September 1914, attached to 2nd Cavalry Brigade
1/1st Warwickshire Battery, RHA (TF) from 14 April 1915 to 21 November 1916, attached to 9th Cavalry Brigade
Y Battery, RHA from 1 December 1916, attached to 9th Cavalry Brigade
VII RHA Brigade Ammunition Column

1st Field Squadron Royal Engineers
1st Signal Squadron, Royal Engineers

== Second World War ==
On 31 October 1939, during the Second World War, the 1st Cavalry Division was reformed. It was assigned to Northern Command, and took command of two pre-war First Line Territorial Army cavalry brigades (the 5th and 6th) and the newly formed 4th Cavalry Brigade. It was the only cavalry division in the British Army during the war.

It departed the United Kingdom in January 1940, transited across France, and arrived in Palestine on 31 January 1940. It served as a garrison force under British Forces, Palestine and Trans-Jordan.

In May 1941, the Divisional Headquarters and elements of the division (notably the 4th Cavalry Brigade), together with a battalion of infantry from the Essex Regiment (the 1st Battalion), a mechanised regiment from the Arab Legion and supporting artillery was reorganised as Habforce for operations in Iraq including the relief of the base at RAF Habbaniya and the occupation of Baghdad. Following this, in July 1941, Habforce was placed under the command of Australian I Corps and was involved in operations against the Vichy French in Syria, advancing from eastern Iraq near the Trans-Jordan border to capture Palmyra and secure the Haditha - Tripoli oil pipeline.

On 1 August 1941, the 1st Cavalry Division was converted into the 10th Armoured Division. (Note: 4th Cavalry Brigade was converted into the 9th Armoured Brigade and 6th Cavalry Brigade into 8th Armoured Brigade) 10th Armoured Division later fought at the Battles of Alam Halfa and El Alamein. The 10th Armoured Division was disbanded in Egypt on 15 June 1944.

== Order of battle in Second World War ==
=== 4th Cavalry Brigade ===
Unit	From	To
Household Cavalry Composite Regiment	13 November 1939	12 January 1941
1st Household Cavalry Regiment (Note: Household Cavalry Composite Regiment was redesignated 1st Household Cavalry Regiment.)	13 January 1941	31 July 1941
North Somerset Yeomanry	15 November 1939	21 March 1941 (Note: North Somerset Yeomanry transferred from 4th to 5th Cavalry Brigade.)
Royal Wiltshire Yeomanry	3 December 1939	2 October 1940 (Note: Royal Wiltshire Yeomanry transferred from 4th to 6th Cavalry Brigade, and back again.)
Royal Wiltshire Yeomanry	8 January 1941	31 July 1941
Warwickshire Yeomanry	22 March 1941 (Note: Warwickshire Yeomanry transferred from 6th to 4th Cavalry Brigade.)	31 July 1941

=== 5th Cavalry Brigade ===
Unit	From	To
Yorkshire Hussars	3 September 1939	22 March 1941 (Note: Yorkshire Hussars transferred from 5th to 6th Cavalry Brigade.)
Sherwood Rangers Yeomanry	3 September 1939	2 February 1941 (Note: Sherwood Rangers transferred to HQ, Middle East Forces and was later converted into an Armoured Regiment with the 8th Armoured Brigade (former 4th Cavalry Brigade).)
Queen's Own Yorkshire Dragoons	3 September 1939	18 March 1942
North Somerset Yeomanry	20 March 1941	20 March 1942
Cheshire Yeomanry	21 March 1941 (Note: Cheshire Yeomanry transferred from 6th to 5th Cavalry Brigade.)	7 June 1941
Cheshire Yeomanry	15 July 1941	21 March 1942
Staffordshire Yeomanry	30 April 1941	4 June 1941 (Note: Staffordshire Yeomanry transferred from 6th to 5th Cavalry Brigade, and back again.)

=== 6th Cavalry Brigade ===
Unit	From	To
Warwickshire Yeomanry	3 September 1939	21 March 1941
Staffordshire Yeomanry	3 September 1939	28 April 1941
Staffordshire Yeomanry	5 June 1941	31 July 1941
Cheshire Yeomanry	3 September 1939	20 March 1941
Royal Wiltshire Yeomanry	3 October 1940	7 January 1941
Royal Scots Greys	1 March 1941 (Note: Royal Scots Greys joined from Force Troops, British Forces in Palestine and Trans-Jordan.)	31 July 1941
Yorkshire Hussars	23 March 1941	31 July 1941

=== Support Units ===
The division also commanded the following support units:

104th (Essex Yeomanry) Regiment, Royal Horse Artillery
106th (Lancashire Hussars) Regiment, Royal Horse Artillery
107th (South Nottinghamshire Hussars) Regiment, Royal Horse Artillery
2nd Field Squadron, Royal Engineers
141st Field Park Squadron, Royal Engineers
1st Cavalry Divisional Signals (Middlesex Yeomanry), Royal Corps of Signals
550th Company, Royal Army Service Corps, TA

== Commanders ==
The 1st Cavalry Division had the following commanders during the First World War:

From	Rank	Name
Mobilization	Major-General	E.H.H. Allenby
12 October 1914	Major-General	H. de B. de Lisle
27 May 1916	Major-General	Hon. C.E. Bingham
24 October 1915	Major-General	R.L. Mullens

The 1st Cavalry Division had the following commanders during the Second World War:

From	Rank	Name
31 October 1939	Major-General	J.G.W. Clark
27 June 1940	Brigadier	J.J. Kingstone (acting)
1 July 1940	Major-General	J.G.W. Clark
26 February 1941	Brigadier	J.J. Kingstone (acting)
8 May 1941	Major-General	J.G.W. Clark

== See also ==
- British Cavalry Corps order of battle 1914
- British cavalry during the First World War
- List of British divisions in World War I
- List of British divisions in World War II
- British armoured formations of the Second World War

== Bibliography ==
- Becke, Major A.F. (1935). Order of Battle of Divisions Part 1. The Regular British Divisions. London: His Majesty's Stationery Office. OCLC 493146210.
- Haythornthwaite, Philip J. (1990). The Napoleonic Source Book. London: Guild Publishing.
- James, Brigadier E.A. (1978). British Regiments 1914–18. London: Samson Books Limited. ISBN 0-906304-03-2.
- Joslen, H. F. (2003) [1960]. Orders of Battle: Second World War, 1939–1945. Uckfield, East Sussex: Naval and Military Press. ISBN 978-1-84342-474-1.
- Reid, Stuart (2004). Wellington's Army in the Peninsula 1809–14. Volume 2 of Battle Orders Series. Oxford: Osprey Publishing. ISBN 1-84176-517-1.
- History of 550 Coy RASC TA 1936-45 by Capt M B Phillips TD
