= E Battery Royal Horse Artillery =

British Army artillery battery

- Active: 1 November 1794 – present
- Country: United Kingdom
- Branch: Army
- Type: Artillery
- Part of: 1st Regiment Royal Horse Artillery
- Anniversaries: Salamanca Day 22 July, Foundation Day (1794) 1 November
- Equipment: AS-90
- Battle honours: Ubique

E Battery Royal Horse Artillery is a Close Support Battery of 1st Regiment Royal Horse Artillery. It is currently based in Purvis Lines in Larkhill Camp.

== History ==
E Battery Royal Horse Artillery was formed as E Troop on 1 November 1794.

=== 19th century ===
E Troop saw action in the Peninsular War in 1811 and also at the Battle of Waterloo. Between 1815 and 1856, the Troop saw service in England, Ireland and the Crimea. In 1859 Troops of the Royal Horse Artillery were designated as Batteries. By this time E Troop had been renamed D Troop. A further reorganisation of the artillery took place in 1877; D Troop was re-designated as E Battery RHA. In 1878, E Battery was deployed to the Second Afghan War. The brigade system was finally abolished on 1 July 1889. Henceforth, batteries were designated in a single alphabetical sequence in order of seniority from date of formation. Lieutenant Colonel Sherwood Dighton Browne, the Commanding Officer of 3rd Brigade, comprising D and E batteries, and his subordinates were at the Artillery Barracks, Chapeltown Road, Leeds as at the time of the 1911 census.

=== World War I ===
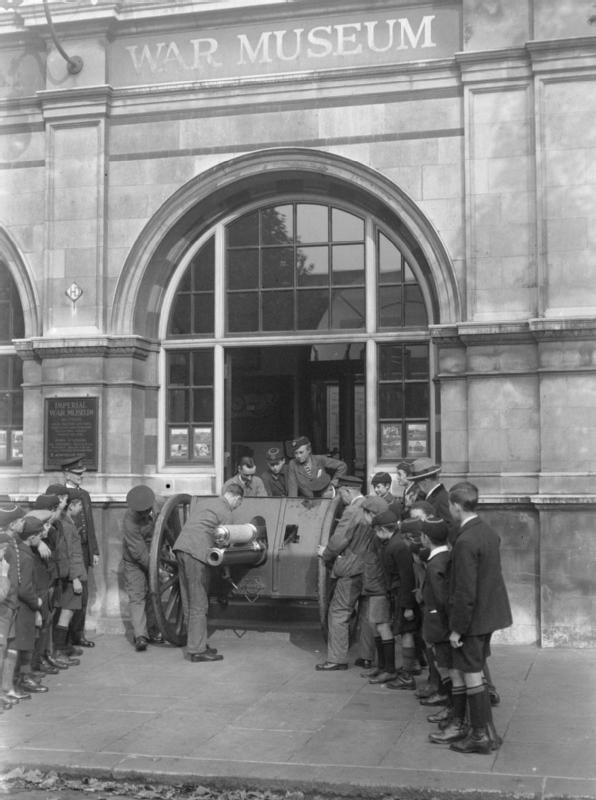
The 13-pounder gun that fired the first British artillery round on the Western front leaves the Imperial War Museum to take part in the unveiling of the Royal Artillery Memorial in October 1925

In 1914, E Battery was sent to France as part of the BEF, equipped with QF 13-pounder guns. At 0930 hours on 22 August 1914, northeast of Harmignies in Belgium, No. 4 gun of E Battery fired the first British artillery rounds on the Western Front in World War I, E Battery went on to fight in many of the battles on the Western Front and then joined the Army of Occupation.

=== Between the World Wars ===
E Battery moved to India in 1926. In 1938, E Battery merged with the A Battery to form A/E Battery prior to the formation of 1 RHA.

=== World War II ===
In 1939, E Battery fought in Belgium and France, before being evacuated from St Valery in June 1940. The battery later deployed to the Western Desert. 1st Regiment Royal Horse Artillery was reorganised as A Battery, B Battery and E Battery. The Battery saw action in the campaigns in the Western Desert and Italy up to 1945.

=== Post war ===
In 1946, E Battery deployed to Egypt and later The Battery went to Palestine. Between 1952 and 1965, E Battery was stationed in Germany. By 1965, E Battery deployed to the Aden Protectorate. In 1990, the Battery provided soldiers for a combined A/B/E Battery which fought in the Gulf War. Later, in 1992, E Battery moved to Assaye Barracks in Tidworth Camp and converted to the AS-90 artillery gun. In the late 1990s, E Battery deployed on to the Balkans. In 2004, E Battery deployed on Operation Telic 4 to Basra, Iraq to train the Iraqi Border Police. By 2005, E Battery deployed to Cyprus for UNFICYP operations and in 2009, the Battery deployed as part of Operation Herrick 11 while in 2013, E Battery deployed as part of Operation Herrick 18.

== Future ==
Under the Army 2020 plan, the battery was re-roled from a light gun battery to an AS-90 battery.

== Current Role ==
E Battery is currently a Close Support Battery which uses the AS-90 Self-propelled artillery Guns. The Battery is sub-divided into four troops:

- Gardiner's Troop: (Gun Troop)
- Salamanca Troop: (Gun Troop)
- Waterloo Troop: (Echelon Troop)
- Mons Troop: (Observation Party Troop (Fire Support Teams and Joint Fires Cell)

== See also ==
- British Army
- Royal Artillery
- Royal Horse Artillery
- List of Royal Artillery Batteries

== Bibliography ==
- Clarke, W.G. (1993). Horse Gunners: The Royal Horse Artillery, 200 Years of Panache and Professionalism. Woolwich: The Royal Artillery Institution. ISBN 09520762-0-9.
- Farndale, General Sir Martin (1986). Western Front 1914-18. History of the Royal Regiment of Artillery. Woolwich: The Royal Artillery Institution. ISBN 1-870114-00-0.
