= D Battery Royal Horse Artillery =

British Army artillery battery

- Sign outside of the D Battery HQ in Basrah, Iraq attached to HESCO barriers.
- Active: 1 November 1794 – present
- Country: United Kingdom
- Branch: Army
- Type: Artillery
- Part of: 3rd Regiment Royal Horse Artillery
- Anniversaries: Waterloo Day 18 June
- Equipment: M270 MLRS
- Battle honours: Ubique

D Battery Royal Horse Artillery are a Precision Strike/Deep Fires Battery of 3rd Regiment Royal Horse Artillery They are currently based in Albemarle Barracks in Newcastle Upon Tyne.

== History ==
D Battery RHA was formed as F Troop RHA in 1794. In 1812, during the Peninsular War, the battery was part of Wellington's Army, where the battery participated in the Battle of Salamanca. The battery was “hotly engaged in repulsing the attack on Hougoumont Farm,” a crucial role in the battle of Waterloo. F Troop fought its most famous battle, Secundra Gunge, on 5th Jan 1858, during the Indian Mutiny.

In 1859 Troops of the Royal Horse Artillery were designated as Batteries. The unit was retitled as "B" Battery, B Brigade. B Battery left their barracks at Exeter, embarked the troopship Jumna at Plymouth on 19 October 1876 and arrived in India on 21 November 1876. A further reorganisation of the artillery took place in 1877 so it was as "F" Battery, A Brigade RHA that they were part of the campaign against hostile tribesmen in the Second Afghan War of 1878–80. F Battery were stationed at Attock in 1879 and 1881. In 1882 F Battery were stationed at Ambala.

The brigade system was finally abolished on 1 July 1889. Henceforth, batteries were designated in a single alphabetical sequence in order of seniority from date of formation and the battery took on its final designation as D Battery, Royal Horse Artillery. Major Eustace and the rest of the battery were at Aldershot as at the time of the 1891 census. From 1898 to 1901 D Battery were stationed at Ambala, once more, redeploying to Meerut by November 1904.

Lieutenant Colonel Sherwood Dighton Browne, the Commanding Officer of 3rd Brigade, comprising D and E batteries, and his subordinates were at the Artillery Barracks, Chapeltown Road, Leeds as at the time of the 1911 census. D Battery was stationed in Ireland at the outbreak of war, and disembarked in France on 17 September 1914. Was transferred to 2nd Cavalry Division on 15 September 1914, the battery then remained with this formation for rest of the war.

In May 1938, 3 Brigade Royal Horse Artillery was re-designated as 3 Regiment Royal Horse Artillery with two batteries (D, J). It took on an anti-tank role.

== See also ==
- British Army
- Royal Artillery
- Royal Horse Artillery
- List of Royal Artillery Batteries

== Bibliography ==
- Clarke, W.G. (1993). Horse Gunners: The Royal Horse Artillery, 200 Years of Panache and Professionalism. Woolwich: The Royal Artillery Institution. ISBN 09520762-0-9.
- Duncan, Francis (1879) [1872]. "CHAPTER XXX. History, Succession of Captains, and Present Designation of the Troops and Companies belonging to the Royal Horse Artillery, the Fifth, Sixth, and Seventh Battalions.". History of the Royal Regiment of Artillery, Vol. 1 (3rd ed.). London: John Murray. OCLC 457352778.
- Duncan, Francis (1879b) [1873]. "Appendix C. Tabular statement showing the date of formation, and former designation, of every battery of the regiment now in the service.". History of the Royal Regiment of Artillery, Vol. 2 (3rd ed.). London: John Murray. OCLC 569878382.
- Laws, M.E.S. (1952). Battery Records of the Royal Artillery 1716–1859. Woolwich: The Royal Artillery Institution. OCLC 2170480.
- Laws, M.E.S. (1970). Battery Records of the Royal Artillery 1859-1877. Woolwich: The Royal Artillery Institution. OCLC 21509290.
- Shadbolt, Sydney Henry (1882). Afghan Campaigns of 1878, 1880. London: S. Low, Marston, Searle, and Rivington. ISBN 978-1-84-342104-7.
