= British cavalry during the First World War =

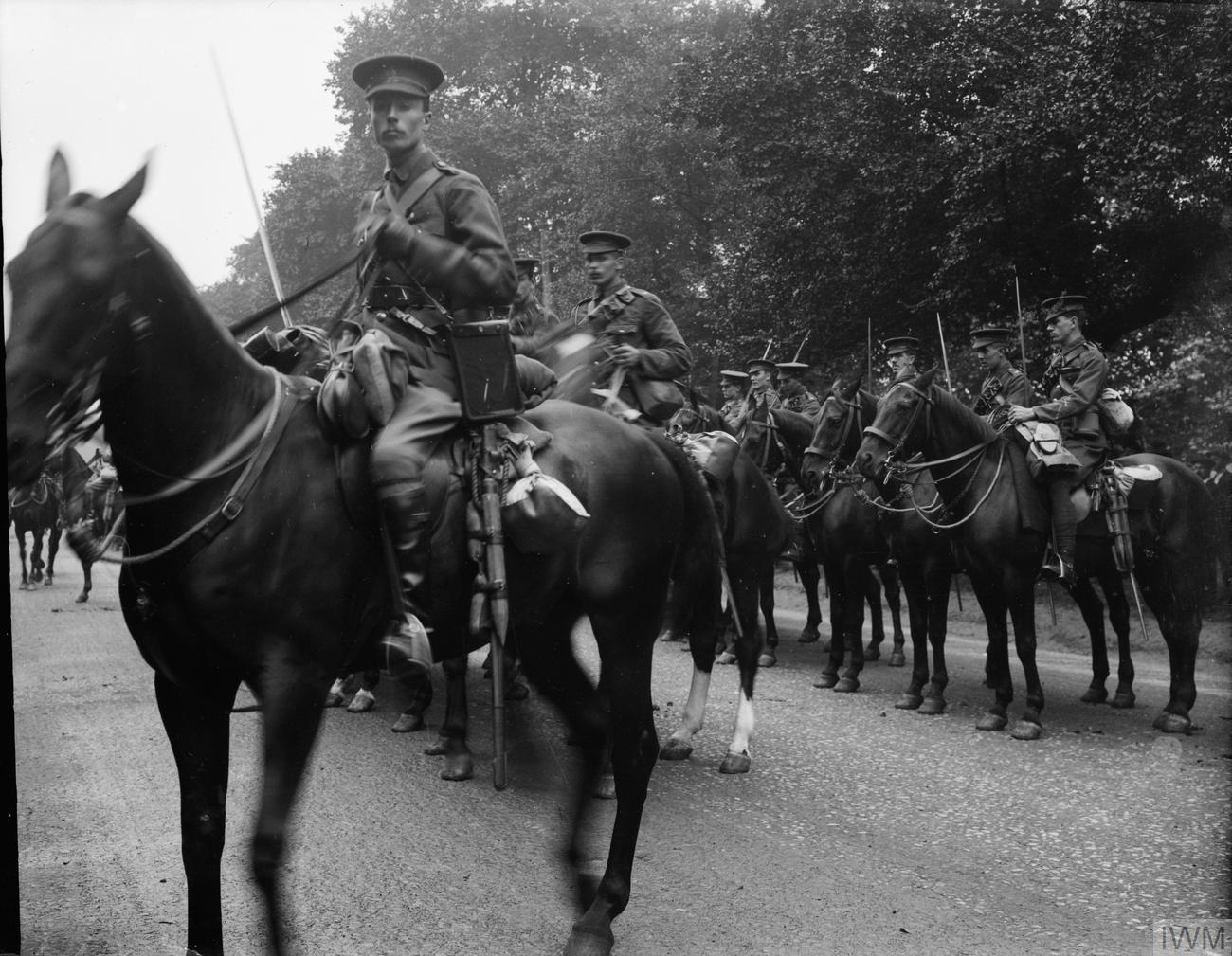
A squadron from the 1st Life Guards, August 1914

The British cavalry were the first British Army units to see action during the First World War. Captain Hornby of the 4th (Royal Irish) Dragoon Guards is reputed to have been the first British soldier to kill a German soldier, using his sword, and Corporal Edward Thomas of the same regiment is reputed to have fired the first British shot shortly after 06:30 on 22 August 1914, near the Belgian village of Casteau. The following Battle of Mons was the first engagement fought by British soldiers in Western Europe since the Battle of Waterloo, ninety-nine years earlier. In the first year of the war in France, nine cavalry brigades were formed for three British cavalry divisions. Other regiments served in six brigades of the two British Indian Army cavalry divisions that were formed for service on the Western Front. Three regiments also fought in the campaign in Mesopotamia, the only other theatre of the First World War where British cavalry served.

The doctrine of the British cavalry had been highly influenced by their experiences in the Second Boer War fifteen years earlier, during which one commander had preferred using irregular units to the professional cavalry regiments. By necessity, cavalry doctrine had changed since then, with emphasis being placed on dismounted firepower and covering fire from the flanks, using machine guns and attached artillery, to support cavalry charges. The only officers to command the British Expeditionary Force on the Western Front were both cavalrymen, while the original commander of the British Cavalry Division went on to command the Egyptian Expeditionary Force during the Palestine Campaign, and another cavalryman became the Chief of the Imperial General Staff. Altogether on the Western Front, five of the ten officers who commanded the five British armies were provided by the cavalry, while another ten commanded corps, and twenty-seven served as divisional commanders.

Among other decorations for their valour, eight cavalrymen were awarded the Victoria Cross, Britain's highest award for bravery in the face of the enemy. Three of the awards came in the first month of the war. All but one of the thirty-two British regular army cavalry regiments fought in a recognised theatre of war, either on the Western Front or in the Mesopotamia Campaign, during which over 5,600 cavalrymen were killed, including several senior officers.

== Background ==
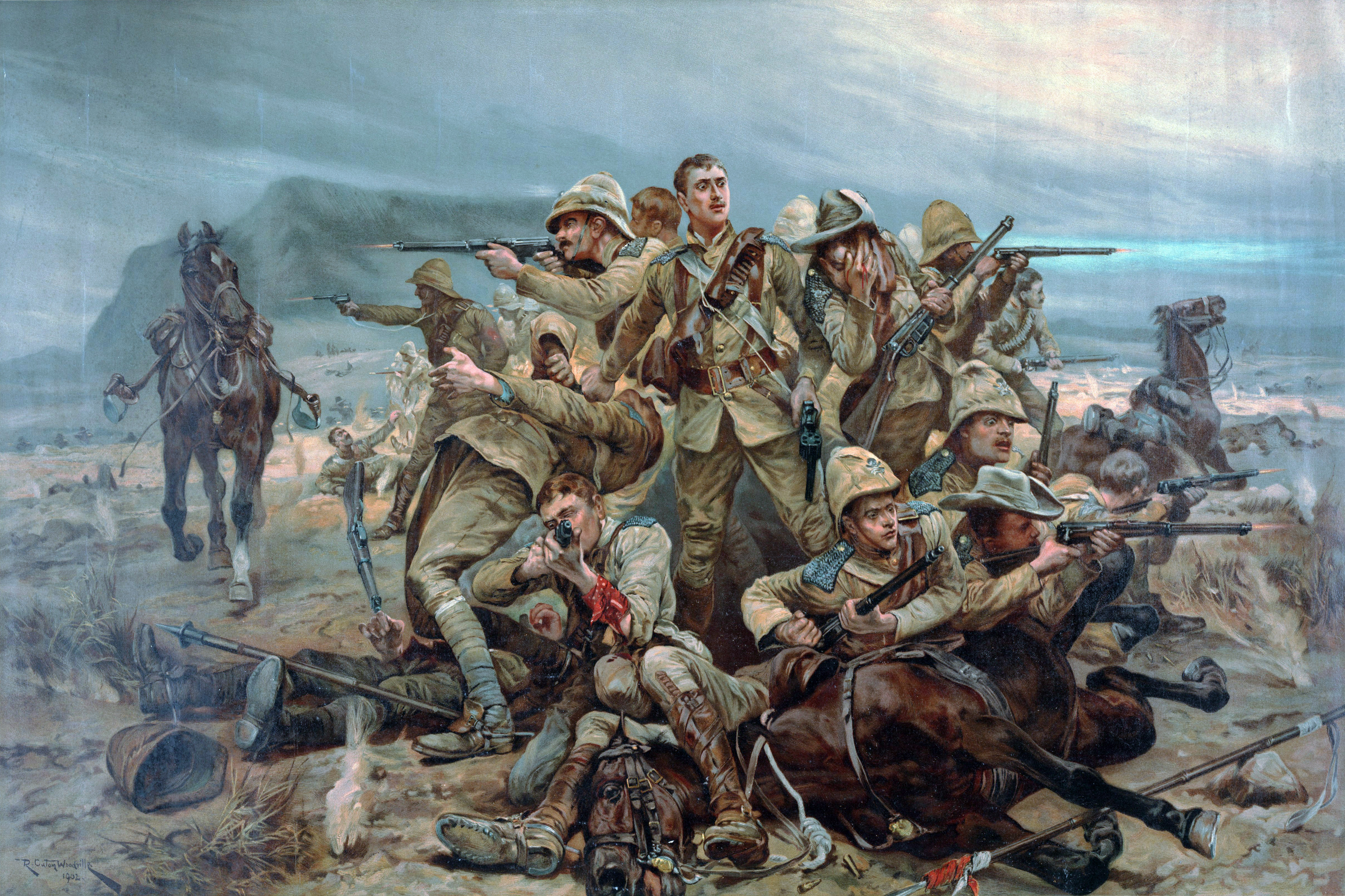
A painting of the 17th (The Duke of Cambridge's Own) Lancers at the Battle of Moddersfontein, 1901

The traditional role of cavalry in war is scouting—gathering information about the enemy's location, strength, and movements—while denying the enemy the same information about one's own forces. Other tasks include raiding into enemy territory and damaging their infrastructure and economy while avoiding conflict with enemy forces. On the field of battle, cavalry were expected to charge into and break up enemy infantry and cavalry formations. The prestige gained by participating in a cavalry charge was such that additional officers would attempt to join one whenever possible. Notable examples of this include Louis Nolan of the 15th Hussars joining the Charge of the Light Brigade in the Crimean War and Winston Churchill of the 4th Hussars joining the 21st Lancers for their charge during the Battle of Omdurman.

Since 1880 British cavalrymen had been armed with carbines and swords and some carried a lance; it was not until 1903 that the cavalry were issued rifles, the same ones used by the rest of the army, although a version of the standard infantry rifle, the shorter-barreled LEC or "Lee-Enfield Cavalry Carbine Mark I" had been introduced in 1896.

The normal peacetime British Army cavalry formation was the brigade, but twice a cavalry division had been formed. The first time was during the Anglo-Egyptian War in 1882.

The second time was during the Second Boer War (1899–1901) in South Africa, the last major conflict fought by the British Army before the First World War. During the fighting in South Africa, it was the 7,000-strong mounted contingents, not the 5,000-strong regular cavalry, that led the way in tactical development. They were better armed and more efficient, if only because they had been correctly trained to use the right weapons and tactics for the conflict. The regular cavalry regiments were considered so unsuitable for the current conflict that General Sir Redvers Henry Buller, commanding the advance into Northern Natal, left his six cavalry regiments behind at Ladysmith, trusting in the irregular mounted forces to carry out patrols in their stead.

Their Boer opponents taught not only the cavalry but the whole army some lessons. In one engagement at Dronfield, 150 Boers held off the British cavalry division, which was then supported by several artillery batteries, and at Bergendal 74 men held up the entire British Army. So effective were their tactics that they forced the British cavalry, if only for a short time, to leave their swords and lances behind and concentrate on their firepower. This proved to the British Army the value of a full size rifle over a carbine. Soon the cavalry were practising working dismounted and advancing in open order. Their change in tactics was evidenced during the charge at Klip Drift. On their way to relieve the siege of Kimberley, the cavalry used their horses and rifles instead of swords and lances to get behind the defending Boers. The charge was later described as "an ideal cavalry operation, but not a cavalry charge as the term is generally understood." Nevertheless, it would prove to be the last time that a full British cavalry division conducted a mounted charge.

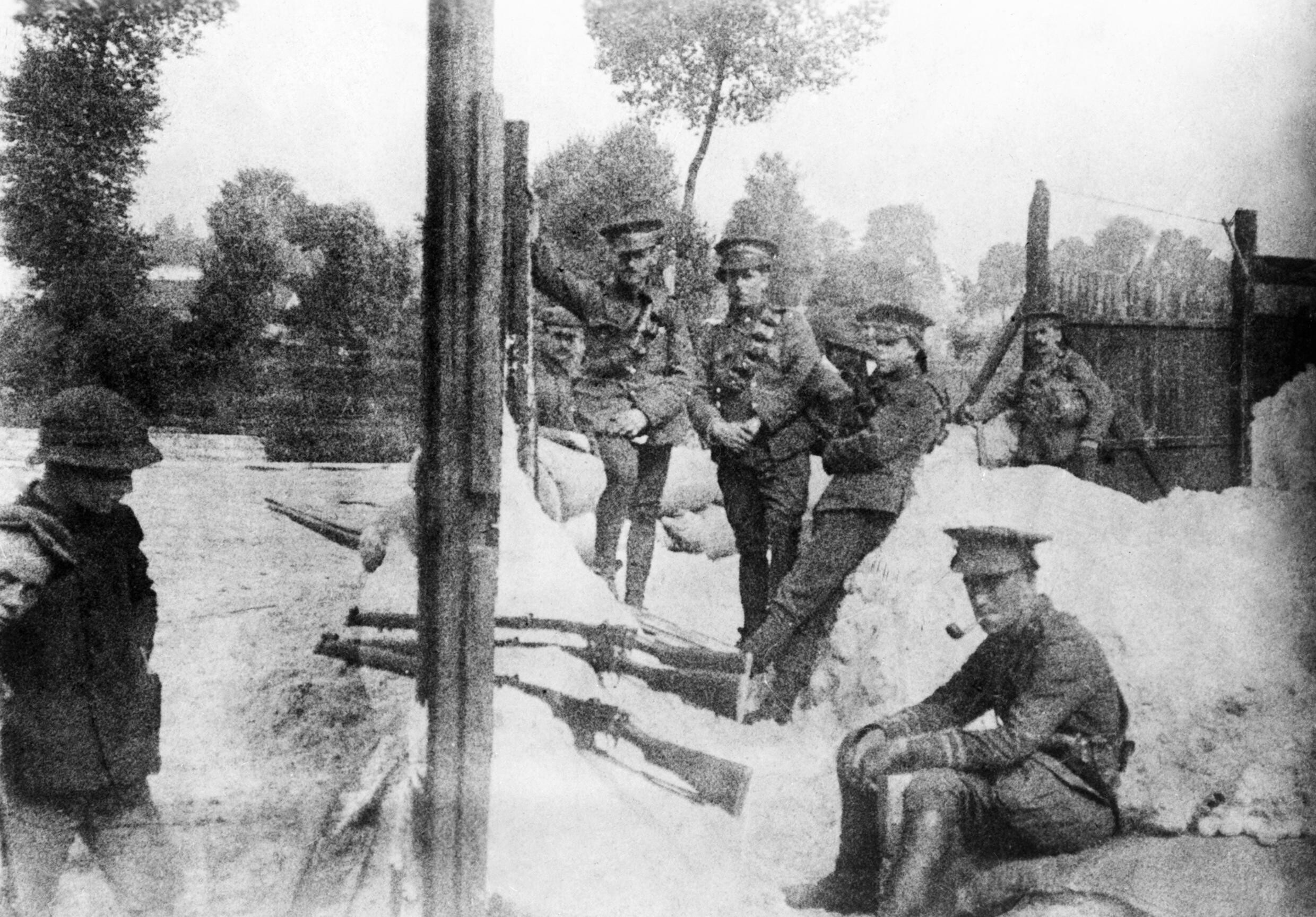
A defensive position built by the 4th (Royal Irish) Dragoon Guards in August 1914

Following the Boer War there were calls for the disbandment of the cavalry by such notable persons as the Commander-in-Chief of the Forces Lord Roberts and Sir Arthur Conan Doyle. Between 1900 and 1903 the cavalry's share of the army budget was cut from six to under 4.5%, and recruiting for the cavalry was suspended for a year. Added to this, the Commonwealth Defence Act 1903 proposed a force of nine brigades formed by a militia, with six of the brigades planned to be mounted infantry known as light horse. In the same year, Lord Roberts appointed Robert Baden-Powell of the 5th Dragoon Guards to the position of Inspector General of Cavalry, a surprising choice as Roberts had earlier described him as being "certainly not a General". Within the year, Baden-Powell was endorsing a change in policy, recommending that instead of countering an enemy charge with a countercharge of their own, the cavalry should dismount and engage them with rifle fire. For cavalry to survive, by necessity British cavalry doctrine had to change, as the emphasis was now on dismounted firepower and cavalry charges that were supported by covering fire from the flanks, by their own machine guns, and the guns of the Royal Horse Artillery (RHA). To support this change in policy, cavalrymen were now required to do two hours rifle or sword practice a day. This made them just as proficient as the infantry with their rifles. In 1908 one regiment, the 14th Hussars, recorded having 354 marksmen, 212 first class shots, 35 second class, and only four third class shots.

The resulting reforms helped shape the cavalry's contribution to the British Expeditionary Force (BEF), which was established with one cavalry division supported by two brigades of horse artillery. All would be trained for the mounted charge but would also be armed with rifles, the only major power to do so. The cavalry regiments were armed with Maxim Machine Guns, which were replaced by Vickers Machine Guns from 1912. More than anything else, the issue of entrenching tools that were carried on the troop packhorses demonstrated how much the cavalry's doctrine had changed since the Boer Wars.

== Organisation ==
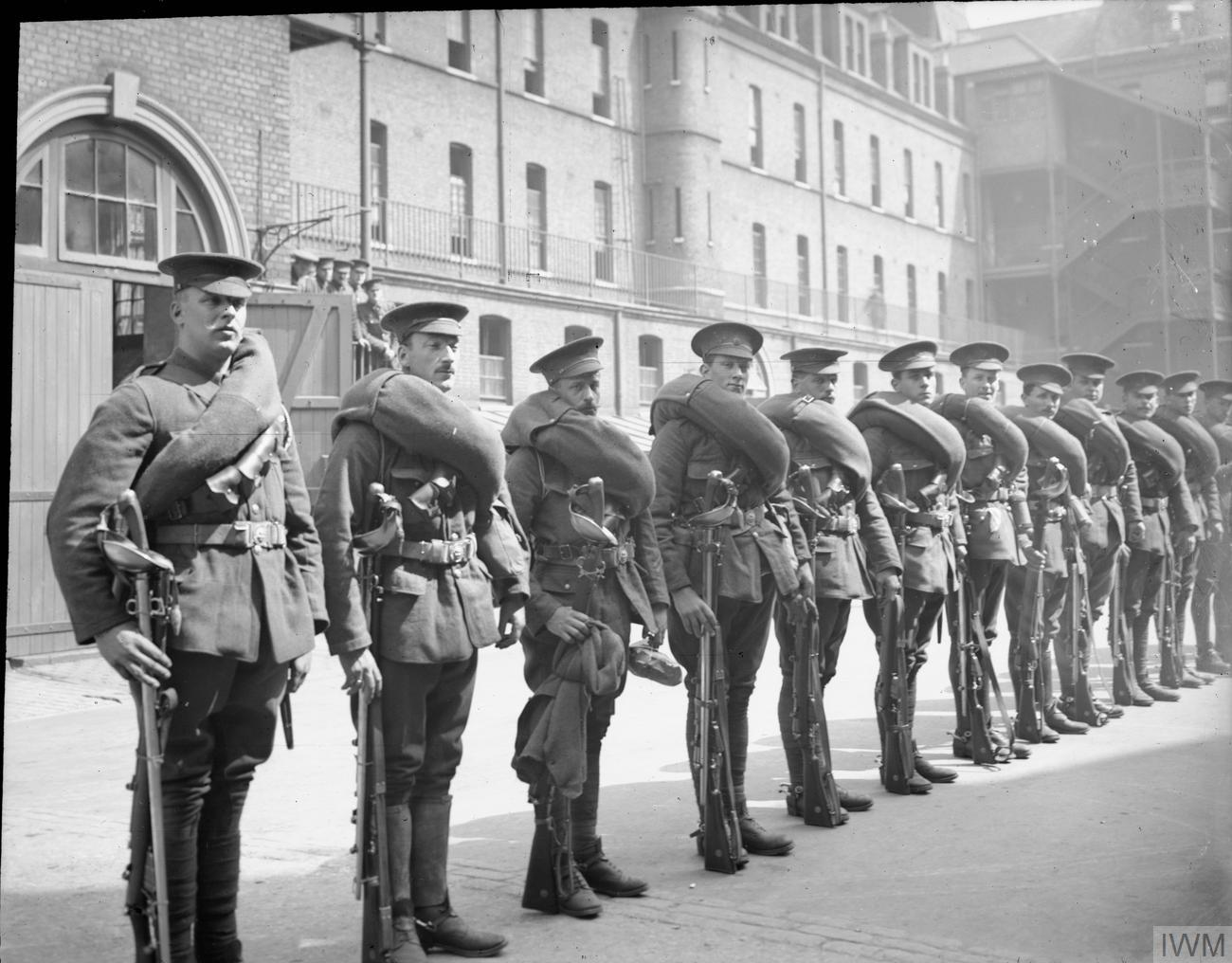
A dismounted section from the 1st Life Guards in 1914. Note the cavalry ammunition bandoliers and the swords, carried on their belts.

In 1914, prior to the start of the First World War, there were just over 15,000 cavalrymen serving in 31 British Army cavalry regiments. (Note: By comparison, the Imperial German Army had 110 cavalry regiments in peacetime in 1914.) There were three Household Cavalry regiments and 28 line cavalry regiments consisting of seven dragoon guards, three dragoon, 12 hussar, and six lancer regiments. In the British Army the term "cavalry" was only used for regular army units. The other mounted regiments in the army, which were part of the Territorial Force reserve, were the 55 yeomanry regiments and three special reserve regiments of horse. Several of the cavalry regiments, amounting to 6,000 men, were serving overseas in British India, South Africa, and Egypt. (Note: The regiments in India were the 1st Dragoon Guards, 7th Dragoon Guards, 6th Dragoons, 7th Hussars, 8th Hussars, 13th Hussars, 14th Hussars, 17th Lancers, and 21st Lancers. In South Africa were the 1st Dragoons and 10th Hussars, while the 3rd Dragoon Guards was in Egypt.) The 12 regiments based in Great Britain were assigned to four cavalry brigades, three regiments per brigade, identified as being part of the cavalry division for the BEF. After the declaration of war in August 1914, the cavalry joined the rest of the BEF in France, together with a fifth independent cavalry brigade, formed from three un-brigaded regiments then based in England. British cavalry brigades were a third larger than French and German brigades, which only had two regiments. To provide a reconnaissance force for the six infantry divisions, two regiments the 15th Hussars and the 19th Hussars were split up with one squadron being assigned to each infantry division. Also in August 1914, a 32nd regiment, the Household Cavalry Composite Regiment, was formed from three squadrons that were drawn from each of the Household Cavalry regiments; its existence proved short-lived as it was disbanded on 11 November 1914, with its manpower returning to their parent regiments. (Note: There was also an infantry Household Battalion formed in September 1916 from the Household Cavalry Reserve Regiments. It served on the Western Front with the 4th Division.)

Early in the war 24 reserve cavalry regiments were formed to provide training to recruits for the cavalry and yeomanry regiments. Only four of them saw any combat—the 6th, 8th, 9th, and 10th Reserve Cavalry Regiments—all during the 1916 Easter Rising in Dublin. The 6th Reserve Cavalry Regiment, with 35 officers and 851 other ranks, was the largest unit then available to Dublin commander Brigadier General William Lowe of the 7th Dragoon Guards.

=== Commanders ===
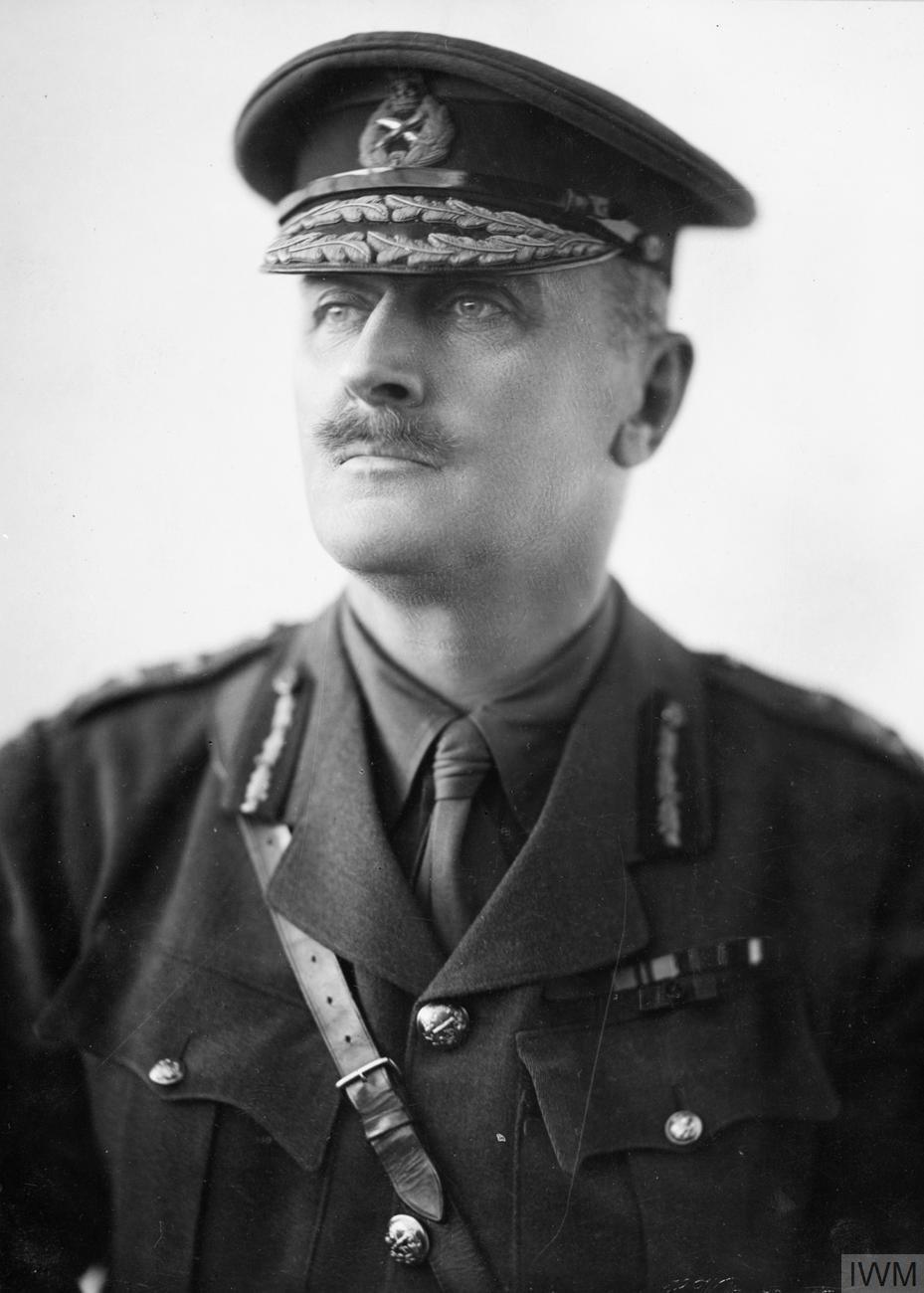
Edmund Allenby, commander of the BEF's cavalry at the start of the war, went on to command the Egyptian Expeditionary Force.

The cavalry were well represented among the British Army's higher ranks, with five of the ten officers who would command the five armies on the Western Front being cavalrymen. The two commanders of the BEF during the First World War, Field Marshals John French and Douglas Haig, came from the 19th Hussars and 7th Hussars respectively. William Robertson, 3rd Dragoon Guards, who rose in rank from private to field marshal, was the Quartermaster General, then Chief of Staff of the BEF before becoming the Chief of the Imperial General Staff in December 1915.

Edmund Allenby, 6th Dragoons, who started the war as the commander of the Cavalry Division, went on to command the Cavalry Corps, then V Corps, the Third Army, and the Egyptian Expeditionary Force. He was replaced as commander of the Third Army by Julian Byng, 10th Hussars, who had previously commanded the Canadian Corps. Hubert Gough of the 16th Lancers, known before the war for his involvement in the Curragh incident, started the war as a brigade commander, became the commander of the I Corps, then the Fifth Army. He was replaced by William Birdwood, 12th Lancers, who had previously commanded the Australian and New Zealand Army Corps during the Gallipoli Campaign. Charles Briggs, 1st Dragoon Guards, commanded the British Salonika Army. William Peyton, 15th Hussars, commanded the Western Desert Force during the Senussi Campaign. He later transferred to the Western Front, where he was temporarily commander of the Fifth Army before taking over command of the X Corps.

Philip Chetwode, 19th Hussars, commanded the XX Corps in Allenby's Egyptian Expeditionary Force. Charles Kavanagh, 10th Hussars, commanded the I Corps and the Cavalry Corps. Hugh Fanshaw, 19th Hussars, commanded the Cavalry Corps and the V Corps. Beauvoir De Lisle, 1st Dragoons, commanded both the XIII and XV Corps. Michael Rimington 6th Dragoons, commanded the Indian Cavalry Corps. Altogether during the First World War, the British cavalry provided ten corps and twenty-seven divisional commanders.

=== Divisions and brigades ===
The original cavalry division consisted of a 96-man headquarters, as well as 6,872 cavalrymen in four brigades, 1,682 artillerymen in four artillery batteries, 191 men in a Royal Engineers field squadron and another 206 men in the engineers signal squadron, 26 men in an Army Service Corps headquarters, and four field ambulances with 496 men. This made a total of 9,269 men, 9,518 horses, 425 wagons, 23 cars, 412 bicycles, 18 motorcycles, 24 13-pounder guns, and 24 Vickers machine guns. It was a large force when mounted, but when asked to serve dismounted, the cavalry division was only the equivalent of two weakened infantry brigades, with less artillery than an infantry division. It did, however, have a higher allocation of artillery compared to foreign cavalry divisions.

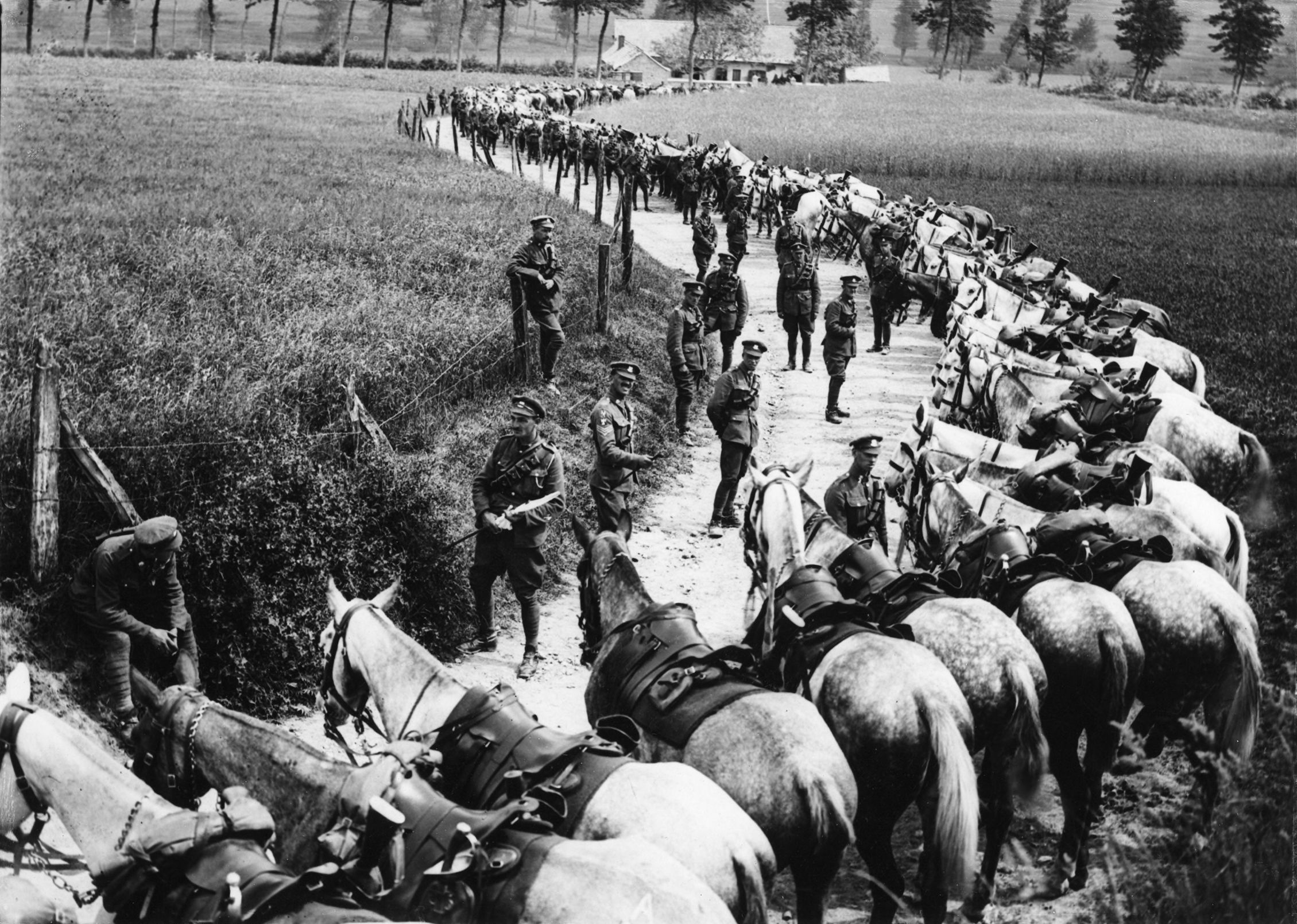
This image of the 2nd Dragoons (Royal Scots Greys) demonstrates the amount of road a cavalry regiment occupied.

By September 1914, the cavalry division was numbered the 1st Cavalry Division. It was joined by the 2nd Cavalry Division, which had been formed on 6 September, and the 3rd Cavalry Division, formed on 29 September. (Note: At this stage of the war their composition was 1st Cavalry Division with the 1st and 2nd Cavalry Brigades; the 2nd Cavalry Division with the 3rd, 4th, and 5th Cavalry Brigades; and the 3rd Cavalry Division with the 6th and 7th Cavalry Brigades.) By the end of the year another six British cavalry regiments (as well as artillery and support elements), which had been in India, were now in France serving in two cavalry divisions that were part of the British Indian Army. The 1st Indian Cavalry Division arrived in November and the 2nd Indian Cavalry Division in December. They were renumbered the 4th and 5th Cavalry Divisions in December 1916. (Note: The 1st/4th Division included the 2nd (Sialkot) Cavalry Brigade, the 3rd (Ambala) Cavalry Brigade, and the 8th (Lucknow) Cavalry Brigade. The 2nd/5th Division had the 5th (Mhow) Cavalry Brigade, the 7th (Meerut) Cavalry Brigade and the 9th (Secunderabad) Cavalry Brigade.) Although they were numbered, to prevent confusion with similar numbered British and Indian brigades, the latter were generally known by their names: for example, the Mhow Cavalry Brigade instead of the 5th (Mhow) Cavalry Brigade. The three British and two Indian cavalry divisions now came under the command of the British Cavalry Corps and the Indian Cavalry Corps.

By the end of 1915, after several occasions when the British had to temporarily dismount regiments and send them into the front lines, an establishment for the Dismounted Cavalry Division was created. The three British cavalry divisions each formed a dismounted cavalry brigade, with the 1st Brigade being raised from the 1st Division, and so on. The cavalry brigades formed a dismounted cavalry battalion, numbered after their parent brigades, so the 9th Cavalry Brigade formed the 9th Dismounted Battalion, for example. The cavalry regiments each formed one dismounted company and a machine gun section for their battalion. However, the Dismounted Cavalry Division, with only three brigades, was smaller than an infantry division, which had four brigades. This disadvantage was felt throughout the formation, with the dismounted cavalry brigade only having three battalions instead of the four in an infantry formation, and the dismounted cavalry battalion only having three, albeit larger, companies as opposed to the four of an infantry battalion. There was one other divisional-sized formation raised in 1916 that contained British cavalry regiments. This was the Imperial Cavalry Division, which served in the campaign in Mesopotamia. This was another British Indian Army division, and like all Indian divisions, it had one British regiment per brigade.

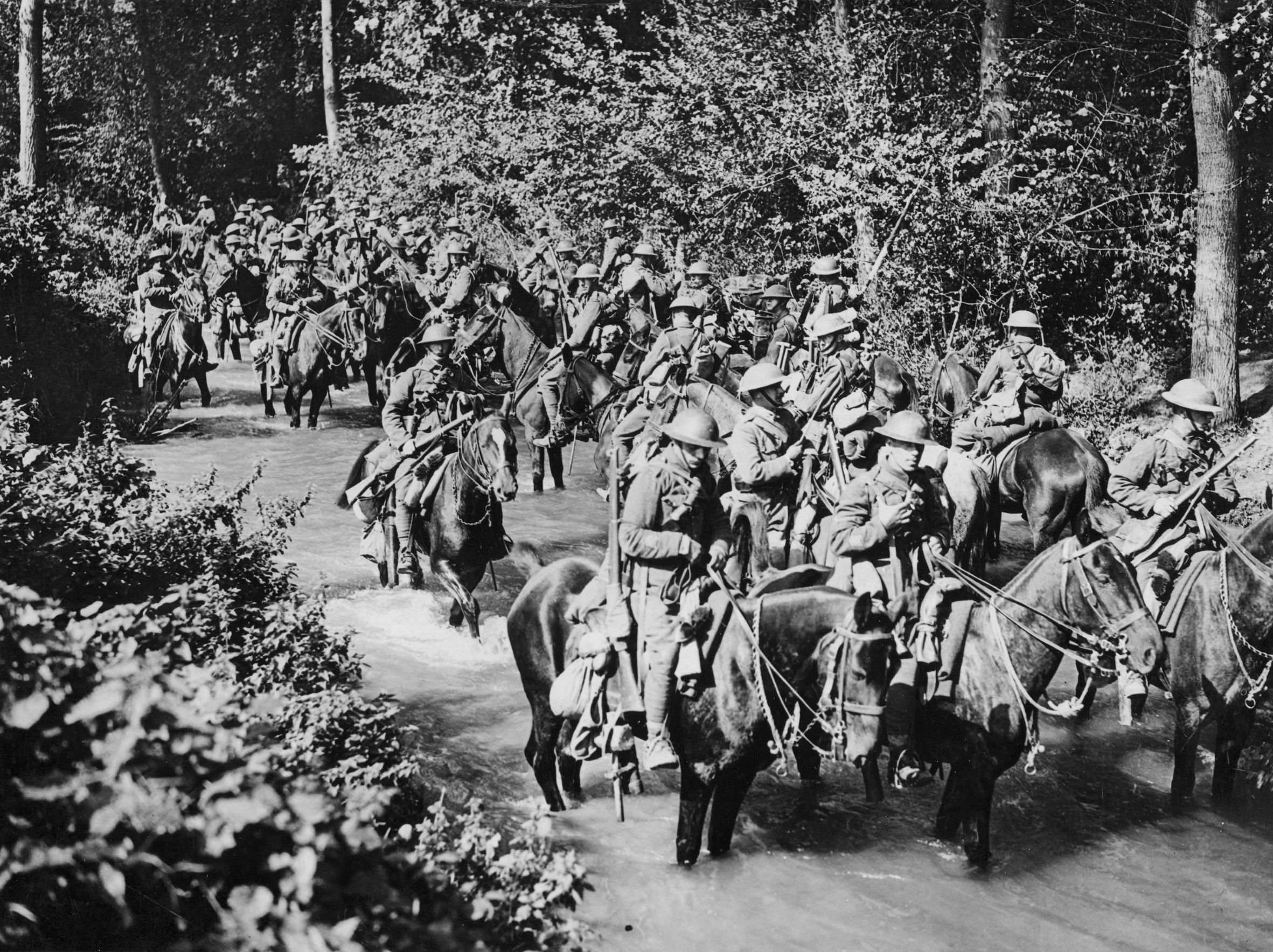
British cavalry, hidden in a stream, wait to move up.

By April 1915 the British Army had formed nine cavalry brigades, serving in three cavalry divisions. (Note: To fill out the British cavalry brigades, several yeomanry regiments were assigned. The 2nd Cavalry Brigade had the 1/1st Queen's Own Oxfordshire Hussars attached between 31 October and 11 November 1914, when they joined the 4th Cavalry Brigade, replacing the Household Cavalry Composite Regiment. The 6th Cavalry Brigade had the 1/1st North Somerset Yeomanry attached from 13 November 1914. The 7th Cavalry Brigade had the 1/1st Leicestershire Yeomanry attached from 12 November 1914. The 8th Cavalry Brigade had the 1/1st Essex Yeomanry attached from 12 December 1914. The 9th Cavalry Brigade had the 1/1st Bedfordshire Yeomanry from June 1915.) A cavalry brigade headquarters had seven officers and 47 men, which controlled three cavalry regiments, a battery of six 13-pounder guns provided by the Royal Horse Artillery, and a signals troop from the Royal Engineers. When dismounted, one man in four would be assigned to hold the horses; therefore a brigade's rifle fire was only equivalent to an infantry battalion. By now only three British cavalry regiments were not serving on the Western Front, having remained in India on internal security duties. These were the 7th Hussars, 14th Hussars, and the 21st Lancers. When the two hussar regiments left for the Mesopotamia Campaign in 1915, only one regiment, the 21st Lancers, remained. They did, however, see action on the North West Frontier, winning one of the eight Victoria Crosses awarded to British cavalrymen during the war. (Note: The eight Victoria Crosses were awarded to Charles Garforth (15th Hussars) for three actions on 23 August and 2 and 3 September 1914, Francis Grenfell (9th Lancers) 24 August 1914, John Norwood (5th Dragoon Guards) 8 September 1914, Charles Hull (21st Lancers) 5 September 1915, Adrian de Wiart (4th Dragoon Guards) 2/3 July 1916, John Dunville (1st Dragoons) 24/25 June 1917, George Clare (5th Lancers) 28/29 November 1917, and Herbert George Columbine (19th Hussars) 23 March 1918, who was attached to the Machine Gun Corps.)

In March 1916 the two cavalry corps were disbanded and the five divisions were assigned to the five British armies. A skeleton corps staff was retained to allow for the re-establishment of a new corps if one was required, which did happen the following September. At the same time, Gough was appointed as the Inspector General of Training of Cavalry Divisions. The cavalry divisions went through a period of training, re-organisation, and issuance of new equipment. One of the major changes was the withdrawal of the regiments' machine guns for their concentration in newly formed brigade machine gun squadrons, each of the 12 sections having two machine guns. The division also received a Light Armoured Car Battery equipped with six Rolls-Royce Armoured Cars. The training covered topics such as how to cross trench systems using mobile bridging equipment, tactics to employ against an entrenched enemy, blowing up and filling in trenches, and skill at arms, including machine guns and bayonet fighting.

=== The cavalry regiment ===
The 1914 British cavalry regiment was composed of 26 officers and 523 other ranks. The commanding officer was a lieutenant colonel, with a major as the second in command; other officers in the headquarters were an adjutant, quartermaster, signals officer, medical officer, and a veterinary officer. The other ranks included one warrant officer, 37 senior non commissioned officers, 22 artificers, six trumpeters, and 457 privates, or 27 officers and 598 other ranks in the regiments based in India.

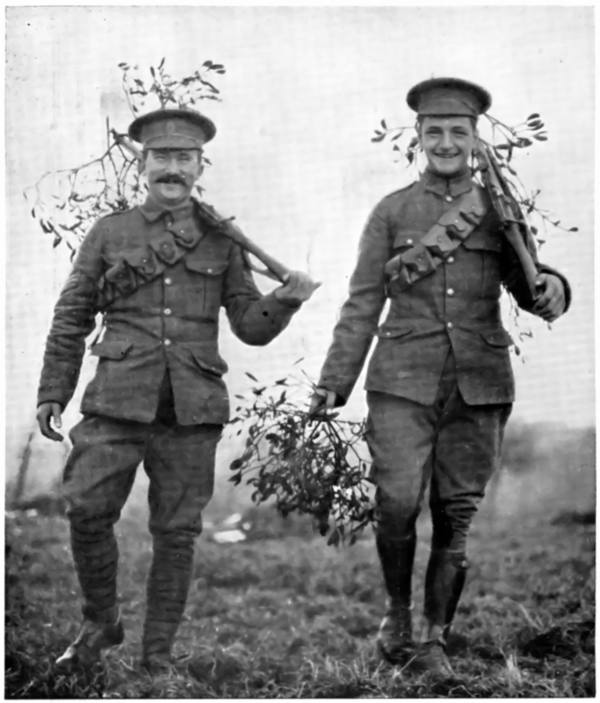
British soldiers, wearing khaki uniforms, service dress caps, and ammunition bandoliers

Of these men, 48 were part of the regimental headquarters, and 27, armed with two Vickers Machine Guns, were assigned to the machine gun section. In 1909 the School of Musketry proposed that each regiment should have six machine guns, but this was declined for "financial reasons". The remaining 474 men were in the regiment's three squadrons, four troops per squadron. Commanded by a major with a captain as the second in command. A squadron had 158 men, six officers, a squadron sergeant major, a squadron quartermaster sergeant, eight sergeants, two trumpeters, six artificers, and 134 other ranks. Each troop had one officer, two sergeants, one artificer, and 30 other ranks. Regiments in India had four squadrons with 173 men in each squadron.

To look after the regiment's horses, attached to the regimental headquarters, was a veterinary officer, a quartermaster sergeant farrier (also responsible for killing wounded or sick horses), a saddler sergeant, and a saddle-tree maker. Each squadron had two saddlers, one a sergeant, and each troop had a shoeing smith. The regiment had 528 riding horses, 74 draught horses, six pack horses, 18 carts or horse-drawn wagons, and 15 bicycles.

British cavalry were armed with a 1908 pattern sword; lancers were armed with a 9.1 feet (2.8 m) lance with a steel head mounted on an ash stave. Cavalrymen were also armed with Lee–Enfield rifles, unlike their French and German counterparts, who were only armed with a shorter range carbine. As the war progressed, the cavalrymen were issued with brodie helmets, hand grenades, trench mortars, and Hotchkiss light machine guns. The replacement of the Vickers Guns with the Hotchkiss, issued one per troop, greatly increased the firepower of the cavalry regiments. Like the infantry, cavalrymen were dressed in a khaki uniform, with a service dress cap. Instead of infantry webbing, they carried their ammunition in a bandolier. The French cuirassiers, by comparison, would not have looked out of place in the Napoleonic Wars; they still wore blue and red uniforms with breast and back metal plates and plumed brass-steel helmets. While the Germans had a standard field grey uniform, their uhlans still wore Polish style czapka helmets and tunics with plastron fronts, while the hussars wore frogged jackets and the cuirassiers had steel spiked helmets.

=== Casualties ===
Although the trench warfare on the Western Front was dominated by the artillery and infantry, the cavalry still suffered 5,674 dead and 14,630 other casualties. For comparison, one infantry regiment—the Northumberland Fusiliers—had 16,000 casualties. Unlike the huge losses in the infantry regiments, only 10 cavalry regiments suffered over 200 dead. The 3rd Dragoon Guards, with 333 dead, had the most killed, while the 7th Hussars had 80 dead, one less than the 21st Lancers, which had remained in India throughout the war. The dead included one major general, 11 brigadier generals, (Note: The eleven being George Milner, Norman Nickalls, Philip Howell, Walter Long, Colquhoun Grant Morrison, Charles Campbell, Charles Bulkeley Bulkeley-Johnson, Paul Aloysius Kenna, George Baillie-Hamilton, George Limbrey Sclater-Booth, and Frank Wormald.) but only 28 of the 1,161 lieutenant colonels killed during the war were from the cavalry, several of those after having assumed command of an infantry battalion. (Note: The full list of dead is: 1st Life Guards 183 dead, 2nd Life Guards 130 dead, Royal Horse Guards 104 dead, 1st Dragoon Guards 146 dead, 2nd Dragoon Guards 240 dead, 3rd Dragoon Guards 333 dead, 4th Dragoon Guards 222 dead, 5th Dragoon Guards 202 dead, 6th Dragoon Guards 241 dead, 7th Dragoon Guards 134 dead, 1st Dragoons 191 dead, 2nd Dragoons 183 dead, 3rd Hussars 126 dead, 4th Hussars 166 dead, 5th Lancers 180 dead, 6th Dragoons 192 dead, 7th Hussars 80 dead, 8th Hussars 124 dead, 9th Lancers 296 dead, 10th Hussars 262 dead, 11th Hussars 181 dead, 12th Lancers 166 dead, 13th Hussars 147 dead, 14th Hussars 164 dead, 15th Hussars 182 dead, 16th Lancers 213 dead, 17th Lancers 127 dead, 18th Hussars 246 dead, 19th Hussars 184 dead, 20th Hussars 248 dead, and 21st Lancers 81 dead.)

== Aftermath ==
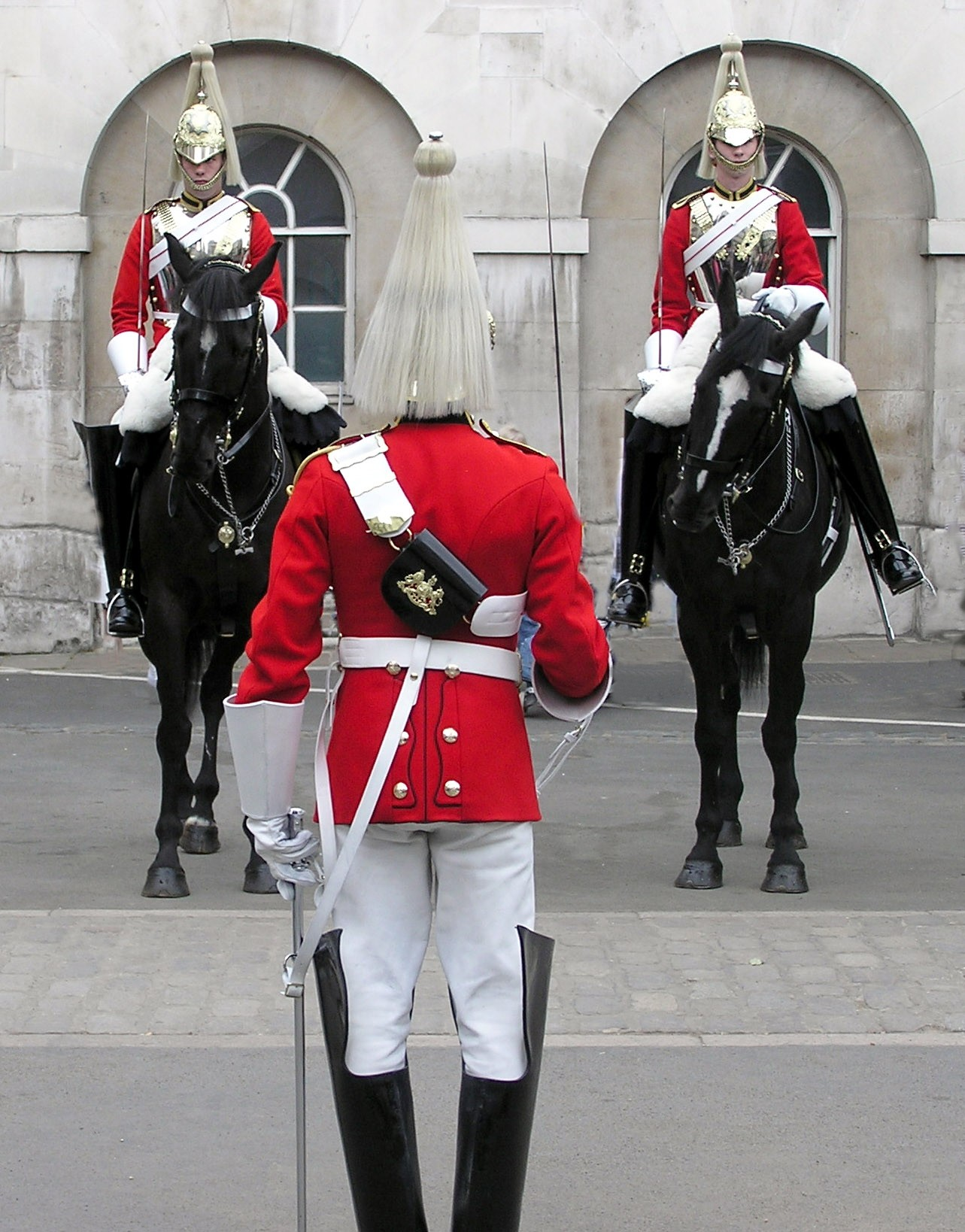
The Life Guards, part of the Household Cavalry Mounted Regiment, at Horse Guards in London, 2009

The British Army tried to learn the lessons of the First World War and incorporate them into its doctrine. In the 1920s and much of the 1930s, the General Staff tried to establish a small, mechanised, professional army; one result was the Experimental Mechanized Force. There was also a general reduction in the army, which resulted in the cavalry branch being reduced in numbers, with several famous regiments being amalgamated. In the Household Cavalry, the 1st and 2nd Life Guards became the Life Guards. In the line cavalry, sixteen regiments were amalgamated, becoming eight new regiments. The 3rd and 6th Dragoon Guards became the 3rd Carabiniers (Prince of Wales's Dragoon Guards), and the 5th Dragoon Guards and the 6th Dragoons became the 5th Royal Inniskilling Dragoon Guards. The other amalgamations used their previous regimental numbers as part of their new regimental names. The new regiments were the 4th/7th Royal Dragoon Guards, the 13th/18th Royal Hussars, the 14th/20th King's Hussars, the 15th/19th The King's Royal Hussars, the 16th/5th The Queen's Royal Lancers, and the 17th/21st Lancers.

Although mechanisation of the British cavalry was well advanced by 1939, there was still a 1st Cavalry Division that served in the Syria–Lebanon Campaign during the Second World War. Eventually all the cavalry regiments were mechanised and became part of the Household Cavalry and the Royal Armoured Corps. There is still one regiment that retains their horses, the Household Cavalry Mounted Regiment, which together with the Household Cavalry Regiment was formed from the Life Guards and the Blues and Royals, which was itself an amalgamation of the Royal Horse Guards (Blues) and the 1st (Royal) Dragoons.

== British cavalry regiments, brigades, and divisions ==
Regiment	Brigade	Division	Notes
1st Life Guards	7th Cavalry Brigade	3rd Cavalry Division	(Note: In March 1918, converted to the 1st Guards Machine Gun Battalion, Guards Machine Gun Regiment.)
2nd Life Guards	7th Cavalry Brigade	3rd Cavalry Division	(Note: In March 1918, converted to the 2nd Guards Machine Gun Battalion, Guards Machine Gun Regiment.)
Royal Horse Guards	7th Cavalry Brigade; 8th Cavalry Brigade	3rd Cavalry Division	(Note: In March 1918, converted into 3rd Guards Machine Gun Battalion, Guards Machine Gun Regiment.)
Household Cavalry Composite Regiment	4th Cavalry Brigade	2nd Cavalry Division	(Note: Formed in August 1914 with one squadron from each of the Household Cavalry regiments; it was disbanded 11 November 1914, with its manpower returning to their parent regiments.)
1st (King's) Dragoon Guards	8th (Lucknow) Cavalry Brigade	1st Indian Cavalry Division	(Note: In August 1918 the regiment returned to India joining the 1st (Peshawar) Division.)
2nd Dragoon Guards (Queen's Bays)	1st Cavalry Brigade	1st Cavalry Division	
3rd (Prince Of Wales's) Dragoon Guards	6th Cavalry Brigade	3rd Cavalry Division	
4th (Royal Irish) Dragoon Guards	2nd Cavalry Brigade	1st Cavalry Division	
5th (Princess Charlotte of Wales's) Dragoon Guards	1st Cavalry Brigade	1st Cavalry Division	
6th Dragoon Guards (Carabiniers)	4th Cavalry Brigade	2nd Cavalry Division	
7th (Princess Royal's) Dragoon Guards	9th (Secunderabad) Cavalry Brigade; 7th Cavalry Brigade	2nd Indian Cavalry Division; 3rd Cavalry Division	
1st (Royal) Dragoons	6th Cavalry Brigade	3rd Cavalry Division	
2nd Dragoons (Royal Scots Greys)	5th Cavalry Brigade	2nd Cavalry Division	
3rd (King's Own) Hussars	4th Cavalry Brigade	2nd Cavalry Division	
4th (Queen's Own) Hussars	3rd Cavalry Brigade	2nd Cavalry Division	
5th (Royal Irish) Lancers	3rd Cavalry Brigade	2nd Cavalry Division	
6th (Inniskilling) Dragoons	5th (Mhow) Cavalry Brigade; 7th Cavalry Brigade	1st Indian Cavalry Division; 2nd Indian Cavalry Division; 3rd Cavalry Division	
7th (Queen's Own) Hussars	11th Indian Cavalry Brigade	Mesopotamia Cavalry Division	
8th (King's Royal Irish) Hussars	3rd (Ambala) Cavalry Brigade; 9th Cavalry Brigade	2nd Indian Cavalry Division; 1st Cavalry Division	
9th (Queen's Royal) Lancers	2nd Cavalry Brigade	1st Cavalry Division	
10th (Prince Of Wales's Own Royal) Hussars	6th Cavalry Brigade; 8th Cavalry Brigade	3rd Cavalry Division	
11th (Prince Albert's Own) Hussars	1st Cavalry Brigade	1st Cavalry Division	
12th (Prince Of Wales's Royal) Lancers	5th Cavalry Brigade	2nd Cavalry Division	
13th Hussars	7th (Meerut) Cavalry Brigade	2nd Indian Cavalry Division; Mesopotamia Cavalry Division	
14th (King's) Hussars	6th Indian Cavalry Brigade	6th (Poona) Division; Mesopotamia Cavalry Division	
15th (The King's) Hussars	9th Cavalry Brigade	1st Cavalry Division	(Note: Between August 1914 and April 1915, the regiment was split up to provide infantry division cavalry squadrons, A Squadron for the 3rd Division, B Squadron the 2nd Division, and C Squadron the 1st Division.)
16th (Queen's) Lancers	3rd Cavalry Brigade	2nd Cavalry Division	
17th (Duke Of Cambridge's Own) Lancers	2nd (Sialkot) Cavalry Brigade; 7th Cavalry Brigade	1st Indian Cavalry Division; 3rd Cavalry Division	
18th (Queen Mary's Own) Hussars	2nd Cavalry Brigade	1st Cavalry Division	
19th (Queen Alexandra's Own Royal) Hussars	9th Cavalry Brigade	1st Cavalry Division	(Note: Between August 1914 and April 1915, the regiment was split up to provide infantry division cavalry squadrons, A Squadron for the 5th Division, B Squadron the 4th Division, and C Squadron the 6th Division.)
20th Hussars	5th Cavalry Brigade	2nd Cavalry Division	
21st (Empress of India's) Lancers	1st (Risalpur) Cavalry Brigade	1st (Peshawar) Division	

Other units that served in British cavalry, brigades, divisions and corps during the war

Regiment — Battery	Brigade	Division	Notes
1/1st Queen's Own Oxfordshire Hussars	2nd Cavalry Brigade; 4th Cavalry Brigade	1st Cavalry Division; 2nd Cavalry Division	
1/1st North Somerset Yeomanry	6th Cavalry Brigade	3rd Cavalry Division	
1/1st Leicestershire Yeomanry	7th Cavalry Brigade	3rd Cavalry Division	
1/1st Essex Yeomanry	8th Cavalry Brigade	3rd Cavalry Division	
1/1st Bedfordshire Yeomanry	9th Cavalry Brigade	1st Cavalry Division	
2nd Lancers (Gardner's Horse)	5th (Mhow) Cavalry Brigade	2nd Indian Cavalry Division; 5th Cavalry Division	
3rd Skinner's Horse	7th (Meerut) Cavalry Brigade	2nd Indian Cavalry Division; 5th Cavalry Division	
6th King Edward's Own Cavalry	2nd (Sialkot) Cavalry Brigade	1st Indian Cavalry Division; 4th Cavalry Division	
9th Hodson's Horse	3rd (Ambala) Cavalry Brigade	1st Indian Cavalry Division; 4th Cavalry Division	
18th King George's Own Lancers	7th (Meerut) Cavalry Brigade	2nd Indian Cavalry Division; 5th Cavalry Division	
19th Lancers (Fane's Horse)	2nd (Sialkot) Cavalry Brigade	1st Indian Cavalry Division; 4th Cavalry Division	
20th Deccan Horse	9th (Secunderabad) Cavalry Brigade	2nd Indian Cavalry Division; 5th Cavalry Division	
29th Lancers (Deccan Horse)	8th (Lucknow) Cavalry Brigade	1st Indian Cavalry Division; 4th Cavalry Division	
30th Lancers (Gordon's Horse)	3rd (Ambala) Cavalry Brigade	1st Indian Cavalry Division; 4th Cavalry Division	
34th Prince Albert Victor's Own Poona Horse	9th (Secunderabad) Cavalry Brigade	2nd Indian Cavalry Division; 5th Cavalry Division	
36th Jacob's Horse	8th (Lucknow) Cavalry Brigade	1st Indian Cavalry Division; 4th Cavalry Division	
38th King George's Own Central India Horse	5th (Mhow) Cavalry Brigade	2nd Indian Cavalry Division; 5th Cavalry Division	
Royal Canadian Dragoons	Canadian Cavalry Brigade	5th Cavalry Division	
Lord Strathcona's Horse	Canadian Cavalry Brigade	5th Cavalry Division	
Fort Garry Horse	Canadian Cavalry Brigade	5th Cavalry Division	
A Battery Royal Horse Artillery	3rd (Ambala) Cavalry Brigade; I Indian Brigade, Royal Horse Artillery	1st Indian Cavalry Division; 4th Cavalry Division	
C Battery Royal Horse Artillery	IV Brigade, Royal Horse Artillery	3rd Cavalry Division	
D Battery Royal Horse Artillery	3rd Cavalry Brigade; III Brigade, Royal Horse Artillery	1st Cavalry Division; 2nd Cavalry Division	
E Battery Royal Horse Artillery	5th Cavalry Brigade; III Brigade, Royal Horse Artillery	1st Cavalry Division; 2nd Cavalry Division	
G Battery Royal Horse Artillery	IV Brigade, Royal Horse Artillery	3rd Cavalry Division	
H Battery Royal Horse Artillery	2nd Cavalry Brigade; VII Brigade, Royal Horse Artillery	1st Cavalry Division; 4th Cavalry Division	
I Battery Royal Horse Artillery	VII Brigade, Royal Horse Artillery	1st Cavalry Division	
J Battery Royal Horse Artillery	4th Cavalry Brigade; III Brigade, Royal Horse Artillery	1st Cavalry Division	
K Battery Royal Horse Artillery	IV Brigade, Royal Horse Artillery	3rd Cavalry Division	
L Battery Royal Horse Artillery	1st Cavalry Brigade	1st Cavalry Division	
N Battery Royal Horse Artillery	9th (Secunderabad) Cavalry Brigade; II Indian Brigade, Royal Horse Artillery	2nd Indian Cavalry Division; 5th Cavalry Division	
Q Battery Royal Horse Artillery	2nd (Sialkot) Cavalry Brigade; I Indian Brigade, Royal Horse Artillery	1st Indian Cavalry Division; 4th Cavalry Division	
U Battery Royal Horse Artillery	8th (Lucknow) Cavalry Brigade; I Indian Brigade, Royal Horse Artillery	1st Indian Cavalry Division; 4th Cavalry Division	
V Battery Royal Horse Artillery	7th (Meerut) Cavalry Brigade; II Indian Brigade, Royal Horse Artillery	2nd Indian Cavalry Division; 5th Cavalry Division	
X Battery Royal Horse Artillery	II Indian Brigade, Royal Horse Artillery	2nd Indian Cavalry Division; 5th Cavalry Division	
Y Battery Royal Horse Artillery	5th (Mhow) Cavalry Brigade	2nd Indian Cavalry Division; 5th Cavalry Division	
1/1st Warwickshire Battery Royal Horse Artillery	9th Cavalry Brigade	1st Cavalry Division	
Royal Canadian Horse Artillery	Canadian Cavalry Brigade	2nd Indian Cavalry Division; 5th Cavalry Division	

== See also ==
- British yeomanry during the First World War
- Second line yeomanry regiments of the British Army
- British First World War cavalry generals

== Bibliography ==
- Arthur, Max (2005). Symbol of Courage: The Men Behind the Medal. Pan Macmillan. ISBN 978-0-330-49133-4.
- Badsey, Stephen (2008). Doctrine and Reform in the British Cavalry 1880–1918. Ashgate. ISBN 978-0-7546-6467-3.
- Barthorp, Michael (1989). The Old Contemptibles. Vol. 24 of Elite Series. Osprey Publishing. ISBN 978-0-85045-898-5.
- Becke, Archibald F. (1935). Order of Battle of Divisions Part 1–The Regular British Divisions. London: HMSO. OCLC 4405016.
- Byrne, Ciaran (2007). The Harp and Crown: The History of the 5th (Royal Irish) Lancers, 1902–1922. Lulu. ISBN 978-1-84753-339-5.
- Chappell, Brad (2008). The Regimental Warpath 1914–1918. Ravi Rikhye. ISBN 978-0-9776072-7-3.
- Childers, Erskine (1911). German Influence on British Cavalry. Arnold. ISBN 978-1-110-85209-3.
- Davies, William C.D (1915). The Battle of Ypres-Armentières, Issues 46–70. Oxford Pamphlets. No. 46. Oxford University Press.
- Edmonds, J. E. (1922). History of the Great War: Military Operations, France and Belgium 1914. History of the Great War. Vol. I. Macmillan & Co. ISBN 978-1-870423-56-4.
- Edmunds, J.E. (1925). History of the Great War: Military Operations, France and Belgium 1914. History of the Great War. Vol. II. Macmillan & Co. ISBN 978-1-84574-717-6.
- French, David (2000). Raising Churchill's Army: The British Army and the War Against Germany, 1919–1945. Oxford University Press. ISBN 0-19-820641-0.
- Glanfield, John (2005). Bravest of the Brave: The Story of the Victoria Cross. Sutton. ISBN 978-0-7509-3695-8.
- Griffith, Paddy (1998). British Fighting Methods in the Great War. Routledge. ISBN 978-0-7146-3495-1.
- Griffiths, William; Griess, Thomas (2003). The Great War. Square One. ISBN 0-7570-0158-0.
- Gudmundsson, Bruce (2004). On Armor Military Profession. Greenwood. ISBN 978-0-275-95019-4.
- Gudmundsson, Bruce (2005). The British Expeditionary Force 1914–15. Vol. 16 of Battle Orders. Osprey. ISBN 978-1-84176-902-8.
- Gudmundsson, Bruce (2007). The British Army on the Western Front 1916. Vol. 29 of Battle Orders. Osprey. ISBN 978-1-84603-111-3.
- Holmes, Richard (2005). Tommy–The British Soldier on the Western Front 1914–1918. Harper Collins. ISBN 978-0-00-713752-7.
- Lomas, David (2012). First Ypres 1914: The Graveyard of the Old Contemptibles. Osprey. ISBN 978-1-78200-442-4.
- McNally, Michael (2007). Easter Rising 1916: Birth of the Irish Republic. Vol. 180 of Campaign Series. Osprey. ISBN 978-1-84603-067-3.
- Pearce, Malcolm; Stewart, Geoffrey (2002). British Political History, 1867–2001: Democracy and Decline. Routledge. ISBN 0-415-26869-9.
- Reynolds, Francis J; Churchill, Allen L; Miller, Francis Trevelyan (1916). The Story of the Great War. Vol. III. P.F.Collier & Son.
- Rinaldi, Richard A (2008). Order of Battle of the British Army 1914. Ravi Rikhye. ISBN 978-0-9776072-8-0.
- Roy, Kaushik (2011). The Indian Army in the Two World Wars. Vol. 70 of History of Warfare. Brill. ISBN 978-90-04-18550-0.
- Sumner, Ian (2001). The Indian Army 1914–1947. Vol. 75 of Elite Series. Osprey. ISBN 978-1-84176-196-1.
- Turner, Alexander (2007). Cambrai 1917: The Birth of Armoured Warfare. Vol. 187 of Campaign Series. Osprey. ISBN 978-1-84603-147-2.
