= Bedfordshire Yeomanry =

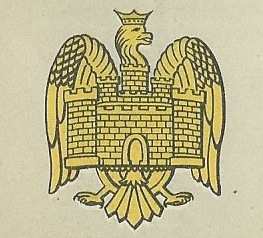
- Active: 1797–1810; 1817–1827; 1901–2014
- Country: Kingdom of Great Britain (1797–1800); United Kingdom (1801–2014)
- Branch: British Army
- Type: Yeomanry
- Size: Regiment
- Part of: Yeomanry (First World War); Royal Artillery (Second World War)
- Garrison/HQ: Bedford
- Engagements: First World War France and Flanders 1915-18 Second World War No battle honours were awarded. It is tradition within artillery units that the Regiment's guns represent its colours and battle honours.

The Bedfordshire Yeomanry was a Yeomanry regiment of the British Army. Serving intermittently between 1797 and 1827, it was re-raised in 1901 for the Second Boer War. It participated in the First World War before being converted to an artillery regiment. It served in the Second World War (as a heavy and a field artillery regiment). Its lineage was maintained by 201 (Hertfordshire and Bedfordshire Yeomanry) Battery, 100th (Yeomanry) Regiment Royal Artillery until that unit was placed in suspended animation in 2014.

== History ==
=== Formation and early history ===
Under threat of invasion by the French Revolutionary government from 1793, and with insufficient military forces to repulse such an attack, the British government under William Pitt the Younger decided in 1794 to increase the Militia and to form corps of volunteers for the defence of the country. The mounted arm of the volunteers became known as the "Gentlemen and Yeomanry Cavalry".

The Bedfordshire Yeomanry was first raised in 1797 as independent troops. These were regimented in 1803 as the Bedfordshire Yeomanry Cavalry but were disbanded in 1810.

A new Bedfordshire Yeomanry Cavalry was raised in 1817, disbanded in 1827.

=== Second Boer War ===
On 13 December 1899, the decision was made to allow volunteer forces to serve in the Second Boer War. Due to the string of defeats during Black Week in December 1899, the British government realized it was going to need more troops than just the regular army, thus issuing a Royal Warrant on 24 December 1899. This warrant officially created the Imperial Yeomanry. The Royal Warrant asked standing Yeomanry regiments to provide service companies of approximately 115 men each. In addition to this, many British citizens (usually mid-upper class) volunteered to join the new regiment.

The first contingent of recruits contained 550 officers, 10,371 men with 20 battalions and 4 companies, which arrived in South Africa between February and April 1900.

The 28th (Bedfordshire) Company of the 4th Battalion, Imperial Yeomanry (also known as Compton's Horse) was raised in January 1900 by Lord Alwyne Compton, the local Bedfordshire MP. This company was perpetuated from 19 September 1901 by the Bedfordshire Imperial Yeomanry.

On 1 September 1901, the regiment was re-raised as the Bedfordshire Imperial Yeomanry with headquarters at Bedford. It was organised in four squadrons and a machine gun section formed from South African war veterans to perpetuate 28th (Bedfordshire) Company, 4th Bn, Imperial Yeomanry. On 1 April 1908, the regiment was renamed as the Bedfordshire Yeomanry and transferred to the Territorial Force, trained and equipped as lancers. The regiment was based at Ashburnham Road in Bedford at this time (since demolished).

The regiment's organisation was:

	Bedfordshire Yeomanry
HQ	Bedford
A Squadron	Bedford
B Squadron	Biggleswade (detachment at Shefford)
C Squadron	Dunstable (detachments at Leighton Buzzard, Woburn, Ampthill)
D Squadron	Godmanchester (Huntingdonshire) (detachments at St Neots, Kimbolton, Ramsey, Somersham, Sutton, Chatteris)

It was ranked as 48th (of 55) in the order of precedence of the Yeomanry Regiments in the Army List of 1914.

=== First World War ===
In accordance with the Territorial and Reserve Forces Act 1907 (7 Edw. 7, c.9), which brought the Territorial Force into being, the TF was intended to be a home defence force for service during wartime and members could not be compelled to serve outside the country. However, on the outbreak of war on 4 August 1914, many members volunteered for Imperial Service. Therefore, TF units were split in August and September 1914 into 1st Line (liable for overseas service) and 2nd Line (home service for those unable or unwilling to serve overseas) units. Later, a 3rd Line was formed to act as a reserve, providing trained replacements for the 1st and 2nd Line regiments.

==== 1/1st Bedfordshire Yeomanry ====
At the outbreak of the First World War, the regiment was attached to the Eastern Mounted Brigade. It mobilised on 4 August 1914 and was stationed at Hatfield Peverel and Stansted until June 1915.

On 12 June 1915, it joined the 9th Cavalry Brigade, 1st Cavalry Division in France, eventually dismounting to serve in the Battle of the Somme, Battle of Cambrai and the Hundred Days Offensive in 1918. As such, it was one of only six yeomanry regiments to be posted to a regular cavalry division in the war. (Note: The other five were: Queen's Own Oxfordshire Hussars in 2nd Cavalry Division; Leicestershire Yeomanry in 3rd Cavalry Division; North Somerset Yeomanry in 3rd Cavalry Division; Essex Yeomanry also in 3rd Cavalry Division.; Queen's Own Yorkshire Dragoons in 4th Cavalry Division)

On 10 March 1918, it left the 1st Cavalry Division with the intention of converting it to a cyclist unit, then to form a machine gun battalion with the Essex Yeomanry. The German spring offensive changed these plans and the regiment was re-mounted and returned to the 1st Cavalry Division. There, it was split up, sending a squadron to each of the regiments in 9th Cavalry Brigade (8th, 15th and 19th Hussars).

The record of the unit's service was set out by L. R. C. Southern (Lieutenant), an officer of the regiment, in The Bedfordshire Yeomanry in the Great War (Rush & Warwick, Bedford, 1935).

==== 2/1st Bedfordshire Yeomanry ====
The 2nd Line regiment was formed in September 1914. From October 1915 to February 1916, it was assigned to the 61st (2nd South Midland) Division in the Chelmsford area. In June 1916, it joined the 16th Mounted Brigade of the 4th Mounted Division in Essex. Later in 1916, the regiment was split up as divisional cavalry:

- A Squadron joined 57th (2nd West Lancashire) Division at Aldershot
- B Squadron joined 66th (2nd East Lancashire) Division at Colchester
- C Squadron joined 68th (2nd Welsh) Division at Turvey

By March 1917 the regiment was concentrated at Ware and attached to the new 1st Mounted Division. C Squadron was attached to the 71st Division. By July 1917, it had been absorbed into the 1st Reserve Cavalry Regiment at The Curragh.

==== 3/1st Bedfordshire Yeomanry ====
The 3rd Line regiment was formed in 1915 and in June was attached to the 13th Reserve Cavalry Regiment at Colchester. It remained in the United Kingdom until July 1917 when it was absorbed into the 1st Reserve Cavalry Regiment at The Curragh.

=== Between the wars ===
On 7 February 1920, the Regiment was reconstituted in the Territorial Army with HQ still at Bedford. Following the experience of the war, it was decided that only the fourteen most senior yeomanry regiments would be retained as horsed cavalry, with the rest being transferred to other roles. As a result, on 5 August 1920, the Regiment was transferred to the Royal Field Artillery (RFA) to form 10th (Bedford) Army Brigade, RFA. It served as 'Army Troops' in 54th (East Anglian) Divisional Area with four batteries: 417–420 (Bedfordshire) Batteries.

The brigade underwent a number of redesignations before the outbreak of the Second World War. In 1921, it was renumbered and regained its yeomanry title as 105th (Bedfordshire Yeomanry) Army Brigade, RFA. Another title change came in 1924 as the Royal Field Artillery was amalgamated back into the Royal Artillery as 105th (Bedfordshire Yeomanry) (Army) Field Brigade, RA. Then, on 1 November 1938, as artillery brigades became regiments, it became the 105th (Bedfordshire Yeomanry) Army Field Regiment, RA.

In 1939, the Territorial Army was "duplicated" - existing units formed a second unit. While the 417th and 418th batteries remained with the 105th (Bedfordshire Yeomanry) Field Regiment, RA, the 419th and 420th batteries were transferred to the newly formed 148th (Bedfordshire Yeomanry) Field Regiment, RA.

=== Second World War ===
==== 52nd (Bedfordshire Yeomanry) Heavy Regiment, RA ====
105th (Bedfordshire Yeomanry) Field Regiment, RA was converted to 52nd (Bedfordshire Yeomanry) Heavy Regiment, RA on 1 November 1939. It fought with the BEF but was disbanded after evacuation from Dunkirk on 20 June 1940.

It was re-raised at Fleetwood, Lancashire, on 11 March 1943 using the Regimental HQ of the disbanded 174th Field Regiment and batteries reformed from coast artillery gunners. It went on to take part in the North West Europe Campaign from June 1944 as part of 5th AGRA. It was disbanded in the British Army of the Rhine on 1 April 1946.

==== 148th (Bedfordshire Yeomanry) Field Regiment, RA ====
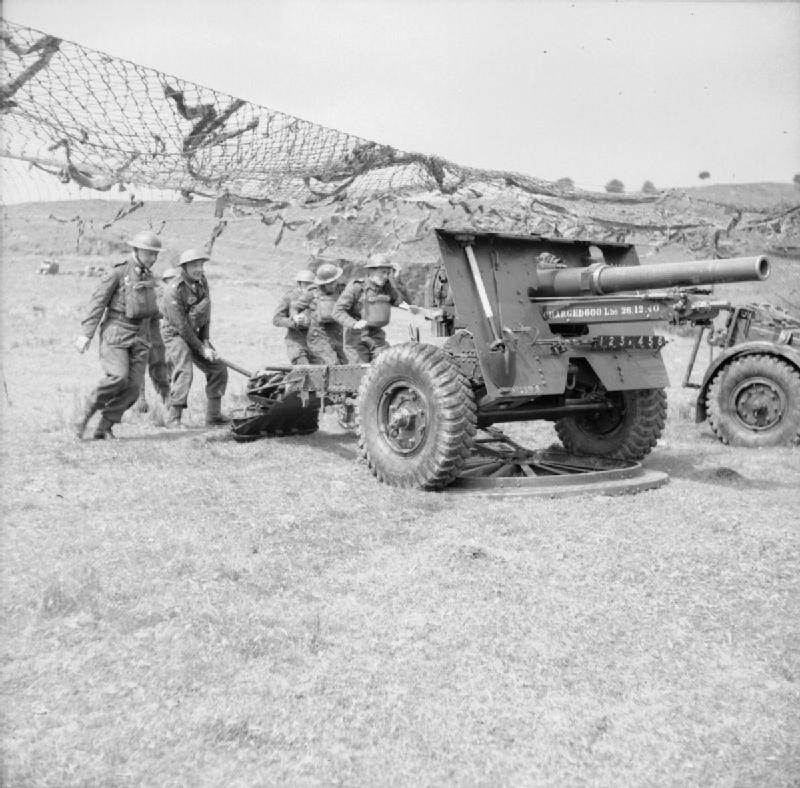
A gun crew of 148th Field Regiment, Royal Artillery, manhandle their 25-pdr field gun into position, during anti-tank training using armour-piercing shells, near Dolgellau in Wales, 19 June 1941 (IWM H10915)

In 1938, Field regiments were organised into two 12-gun batteries. The experience of the BEF in 1940 showed the problem with this organisation: field regiments were intended to support an infantry brigade of three battalions, which could not be managed without severe disruption to the regiment. As a result, field regiments were reorganised into three 8-gun batteries.

At the outbreak of the war, 148th (Bedfordshire Yeomanry) Field Regiment RA was assigned to the 18th (East Anglian) Infantry Division. Initially commanding two batteries (419 and 420), the third battery (512) was formed in the regiment at Rochdale on 1 June 1941.

The regiment was transferred to Singapore with its division, arriving just before the Fall of Singapore in February 1942. The regiment was authorised to use the "Bedfordshire Yeomanry" designation from 17 February 1942 but, as it was captured on 15 February, this change was ineffective.

=== Post-war ===
On 1 January 1947, the regiment was reconstituted in the Territorial Army as 305 (Bedfordshire Yeomanry) Medium Regiment, RA. On 31 October 1956, it was re-roled and renamed as 305 (Bedfordshire Yeomanry) Light Regiment, RA. Finally, on 1 May 1961, it was amalgamated with 286 (Hertfordshire Yeomanry) Field Regiment to form 286 (Hertfordshire and Bedfordshire Yeomanry) Field Regiment. The unit was reduced to battery strength as 201 (Hertfordshire and Bedfordshire Yeomanry) Battery, 100th (Yeomanry) Regiment Royal Artillery in 1967. Under Army 2020, this unit was placed in suspended animation in 2014.

== Battle honours ==
The Bedfordshire Yeomanry has been awarded the following battle honours:

First World War

Somme 1916 '18, Flers-Courcelette, Cambrai 1917 '18, Amiens, Albert 1918, Hindenburg Line, St Quentin Canal, Beaurevoir, Pursuit to Mons, France and Flanders 1915–18

Second World War

The Royal Artillery was present in nearly all battles and would have earned most of the honours awarded to cavalry and infantry regiments. In 1833, William IV awarded the motto Ubique (meaning "everywhere") in place of all battle honours.

== Uniform ==
Prior to 1914, the Bedfordshire Yeomanry wore a dark blue review order with white gorget collar, piping and trouser stripes. The headdress was a blue peaked cap with white lancer style quartering. Silver chain-mail epaulettes were attached to the tunics.

== See also ==
- Imperial Yeomanry
- List of Yeomanry Regiments 1908
- Yeomanry
- Yeomanry order of precedence
- British yeomanry during the First World War
- Second line yeomanry regiments of the British Army
- List of British Army Yeomanry Regiments converted to Royal Artillery

== Bibliography ==
- Becke, Archibald F. (1935). Order of Battle of Divisions Part 1–The Regular British Divisions. London: HMSO. OCLC 4405016.
- Bellis, Malcolm A. (1995). Regiments of the British Army 1939–1945 (Artillery). London: Military Press International. ISBN 0-85420-110-6.
- Forty, George (1998). British Army Handbook 1939–1945. Stroud, Gloucestershire: Sutton Publishing Limited. ISBN 0-7509-1403-3.
- Frederick, J.B.M. (1984). Lineage Book of British Land Forces 1660–1978. Wakefield, Yorkshire: Microform Academic Publishers. ISBN 1-85117-009-X.
- James, Brigadier E.A. (1978). British Regiments 1914–18. London: Samson Books Limited. ISBN 0-906304-03-2.
- Norman E.H. Litchfield, The Territorial Artillery 1908–1988 (Their Lineage, Uniforms and Badges), Nottingham: Sherwood Press, 1992, ISBN 0-9508205-2-0.
- Mileham, Patrick (1994). The Yeomanry Regiments; 200 Years of Tradition. Edinburgh: Canongate Academic. ISBN 1-898410-36-4.
- Perry, F.W. (1993). Order of Battle of Divisions Part 5B. Indian Army Divisions. Newport: Ray Westlake Military Books. ISBN 1-871167-23-X.
- Rinaldi, Richard A (2008). Order of Battle of the British Army 1914. Ravi Rikhye. ISBN 978-0-9776072-8-0.
- Titles and Designations of Formations and Units of the Territorial Army, London: War Office, 7 November 1927 (RA sections also summarised in Litchfield, Appendix IV).
