= William Thomas Marshall =

English recipient of the Victoria Cross

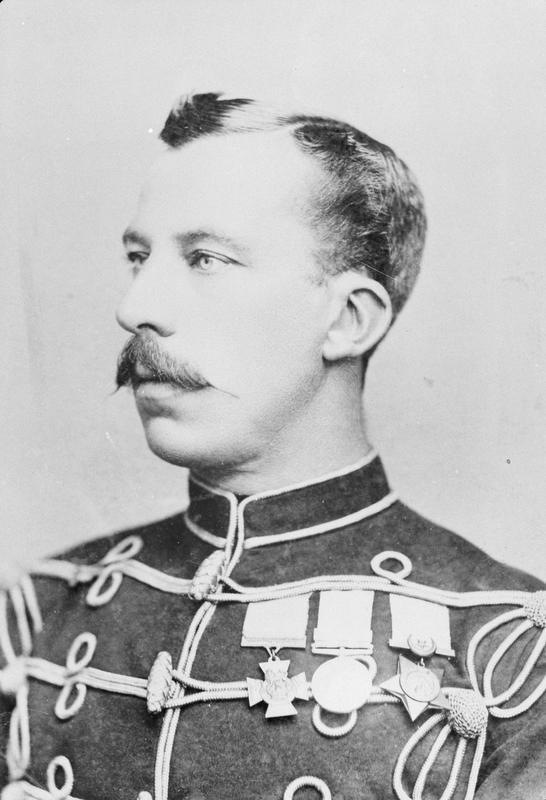
- Born: 5 December 1854; Newark, Nottinghamshire
- Died: 11 September 1920 (aged 65); Kirkcaldy, Fife
- Burial place: Bennochy Road Cemetery, Kirkcaldy
- Military career
- Allegiance: United Kingdom
- Branch: British Army
- Service years: 1873–1907
- Rank: Lieutenant-Colonel
- Units: 19th Hussars
- Conflicts: 1882 Anglo-Egyptian War; Mahdist War; Second Boer War
- Awards: Victoria Cross

Lieutenant-Colonel William Thomas Marshall VC (5 December 1854 – 11 September 1920) was an English recipient of the Victoria Cross, the highest and most prestigious award for gallantry in the face of the enemy that can be awarded to British and Commonwealth forces.

== Details ==
Marshall was 29 years old, and a quartermaster-sergeant in the 19th Hussars, British Army during the Mahdist War when the following deed took place for which he was awarded the VC.

On 29 February 1884 at Battle of El Teb, Sudan, the Commanding Officer of the 19th Hussars, Lt. Col. Percy Barrow, was severely wounded, his horse was killed and he was on the ground surrounded by the enemy. Quartermaster-Sergeant Marshall, rode to his assistance, seized his hand and dragged him through the enemy back to the regiment, saving him from certain death.

He became quartermaster in the regiment on 20 January 1885, and was promoted to Honorary captain on 20 January 1895. In 1902 he was acting quartermaster of the 2nd Provisional Regiment of Dragoons. In 1905, as a major, he became Camp Quartermaster of Aldershot. He retired in 1907. He was Secretary of the Fife County Territorial Association, in Scotland. He served again in World War I, becoming promoted lieutenant-colonel in 1918. He died in 1920 in Kirkcaldy and was buried at the town's Bennochy Road Cemetery.

His Victoria Cross is displayed in The Light Dragoons (15th/19th King's Royal Hussars) Museum Collection at the Discovery Museum, Newcastle upon Tyne, England.
