= 9th Cavalry Brigade (United Kingdom) =

- Active: 1915–1919
- Country: United Kingdom
- Branch: British Army
- Type: Cavalry
- Size: Brigade
- Part of: 1st Cavalry Division
- Engagements: World War I Western Front

The 9th Cavalry Brigade was a cavalry brigade of the British Army in World War I. It was formed in France in 1915 and served on the Western Front as part of the 1st Cavalry Division until the end of the war.

== First World War ==
=== Formation ===
Divisional reconnaissance squadrons, August 1914
15th Hussars	A Squadron	3rd Division
15th Hussars	B Squadron	2nd Division
15th Hussars	C Squadron	1st Division
19th Hussars	A Squadron	5th Division
19th Hussars	B Squadron	4th Division
19th Hussars	C Squadron	6th Division

9th Cavalry Brigade was formed in France on 14 April 1915 with the 15th Hussars and the 19th Hussars. These regular cavalry regiments had been serving on the Western Front since August 1914 as divisional cavalry squadrons assigned to infantry divisions. On the same date, 1/1st Warwickshire Battery, Royal Horse Artillery (TF) (transferred from the 2nd Cavalry Division) and a signal troop joined.

On formation, the brigade was assigned to the 1st Cavalry Division to bring it up to a three brigade standard. 1st Cavalry Division also obtained a third Cavalry Field Ambulance (9th, from England on 23 May) and a third Mobile Veterinary Section (39th, from England on 23 August).

On 12 June, 1/1st Bedfordshire Yeomanry joined from the Eastern Mounted Brigade in England to bring the brigade up to the standard three regiment strength. On 28 February 1916, a Machine Gun Squadron was formed from the machine gun sections of the brigade's constituent regiments.

=== Chronicle ===
With the 1st Cavalry Division, the brigade took part in most of the major actions where cavalry could be used as a mounted mobile force. At other times it formed a dismounted unit and served in the trenches (as a regiment under the command of the brigadier). Notable amongst these occasions was on 24–25 March 1918 when, in the Battle of Bapaume, the division formed a "Dismounted Division" under Brigadier-General D'Arcy Legard.

In 1915, it took part in the Second Battle of Ypres and the Battle of Flers–Courcelette in 1916. 1917 saw action at the Battle of Arras and the Battle of Cambrai and in 1918 at the First Battle of the Somme, the Battle of Amiens, the Second Battle of the Somme and the battles of the Hindenburg Line. It then took part in the Final Advance in Artois and the Final Advance in Picardy.

By the Armistice, the division was north of Mons, about 9 miles east of Ath on the Fifth Army front. On 16 November 1918, orders were received that the 1st Cavalry Division would lead the advance of the Second Army into Germany. Moving through Namur, the division crossed the frontier on 1 December and on 7 December the brigade reached the Rhine north of Cologne. On 12 December, the brigade crossed the Rhine on the Hohenzollern Bridge and reached its position on the perimeter of the bridgehead the next day.

=== Units ===
Unit	From	To
15th (The King's) Hussars	14 April 1915	
19th (Queen Alexandra's Own Royal) Hussars	14 April 1915	
1/1st Bedfordshire Yeomanry	12 June 1915	10 March 1918
1/1st Bedfordshire Yeomanry	April 1918 (Note: 1/1st Bedfordshire Yeomanry left to become a cyclist unit, then to form a machine gun battalion with the 1/1st Essex Yeomanry. The German spring offensive forestalled this plan, and the regiment was remounted and returned to 1st Cavalry Division. From April 1918 it was split up with a squadron joining each regiment in 9th Cavalry Brigade (8th, 15th and 19th Hussars).)	
8th (The King's Royal Irish) Hussars	10 March 1918 (Note: 8th Hussars joined from 3rd (Ambala) Cavalry Brigade of the 5th Cavalry Division after it was broken up. On 11 March it came on the British War Establishment i.e. the 4th squadron was absorbed into the others.)	
1/1st Warwickshire Battery, RHA (TF)	14 April 1915	21 November 1916 (Note: Warwickshire Battery, RHA transferred to XV Brigade, Royal Horse Artillery in 29th Division in exchange for Y Battery, RHA.)
Y Battery, RHA	1 December 1916	
9th Signal Troop, Royal Engineers	14 April 1915	
9th Cavalry Brigade Machine Gun Squadron, MGC	28 February 1916	

== Commanders ==
The 9th Cavalry Brigade had the following commanders:

From	Rank	Name
14 April 1915	Brigadier-General	W.H. Greenley
15 November 1915	Brigadier-General	S.R. Kirby
25 October 1916	Lieutenant-Colonel	G.D. Franks (acting)
31 October 1916	Brigadier-General	D'A. Legard

== See also ==
- British Army during World War I
- British cavalry during the First World War

== Bibliography ==
- Becke, Archibald F. (1935). Order of Battle of Divisions Part 1–The Regular British Divisions. London: HMSO. OCLC 4405016.
- James, Brigadier E.A. (1978). British Regiments 1914–18. London: Samson Books Limited. ISBN 0-906304-03-2.
