= Charles Ernest Garforth =

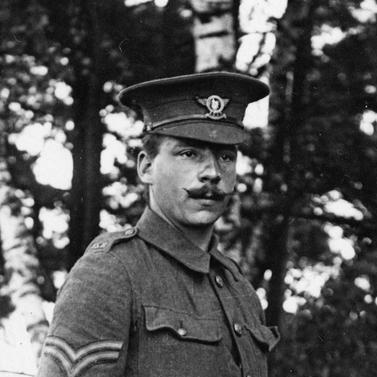
- Born: 23 October 1891; Willesden Green, London, England
- Died: 1 July 1973 (aged 81); Beeston, Nottinghamshire, England
- Burial place: Wilford Hill Cemetery Crematorium, Nottingham, Nottinghamshire, England
- Military career
- Allegiance: United Kingdom
- Branch: British Army
- Rank: Sergeant
- Service number: 7368
- Units: 15th (The King's) Hussars
- Conflicts: First World War
- Awards: Victoria Cross

Sergeant Charles Ernest Garforth VC (23 October 1891 – 1 July 1973) was a British Army soldier and an English recipient of the Victoria Cross (VC), the highest and most prestigious award for gallantry in the face of the enemy that can be awarded to British and Commonwealth forces. His VC was one of the two first VCs won in the First World War.

Garforth was 22 years old, and a corporal in the 15th (The King's) Hussars, British Army during the First World War when the following deeds took place for which he was awarded the VC.

On 23 August 1914 at Harmingnies, Belgium, Corporal Garforth volunteered to cut wire under fire, which enabled his squadron to escape. On 2 September when under constant fire in Dammartin, France, he extricated a sergeant who was lying under his dead horse, and carried him to safety. The next day, when another sergeant had lost his horse in a similar way, Corporal Garforth drew off the enemy fire and enabled the sergeant to get away.

He was taken prisoner in October 1914 and was repatriated in November 1918. He later achieved the rank of sergeant. His VC and other medals are displayed at the Imperial War Museum, London.

Upon his death, Garforth was cremated, and no monument or headstone was laid, as he technically had no grave. This was rectified on 30 August 2008, when a headstone was dedicated to him at Wilford Hill Cemetery in Nottingham, where his ashes were originally scattered. In August 2014 a memorial plaque was laid in the pavement in Willesden Green High Street, outside the post office, by the Department for Communities and Local Government.

== Bibliography ==
- Gliddon, Gerald (2011) [1994]. 1914. VCs of the First World War. The History Press. ISBN 978-0752459080.
