= 19th Royal Hussars =

British Army cavalry regiment

19th Royal Hussars (Queen Alexandra's Own)
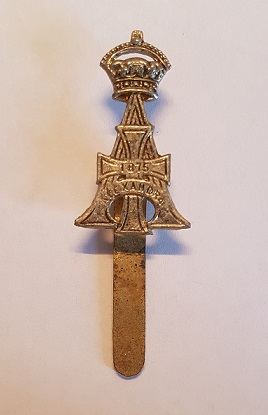
- Cap badge of the 19th Royal Hussars
- Active: 1858–1922
- Country: United Kingdom
- Branch: British Army
- Type: Cavalry
- Role: Line Cavalry
- Size: One Regiment

The 19th Royal Hussars (Queen Alexandra's Own) was a cavalry regiment of the British Army, created in 1858. After serving in the First World War, it was amalgamated with the 15th The King's Hussars to form the 15th/19th The King's Royal Hussars in 1922.

== History ==
=== Early history ===
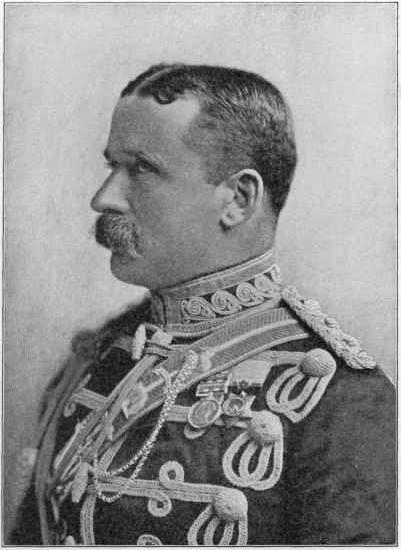
Lord French, who joined the 19th Royal Hussars as a junior officer in March 1874

The regiment was originally raised in Bengal by the East India Company as the 1st Bengal European Light Cavalry in 1858, for service in the response to the Indian Rebellion. During the rebellion, a lieutenant of the regiment, Hugh Henry Gough, received the Victoria Cross.

As with all other "European" units of the Company, they were placed under the command of the Crown in 1858, and subsequently formally moved into the British Army in 1862 when they were designated as hussars as the 19th Hussars. At this time, the regiment was authorised to inherit the battle honours of the disbanded 19th Light Dragoons. John French, who later became a field marshal, joined the regiment as a junior officer in March 1874.

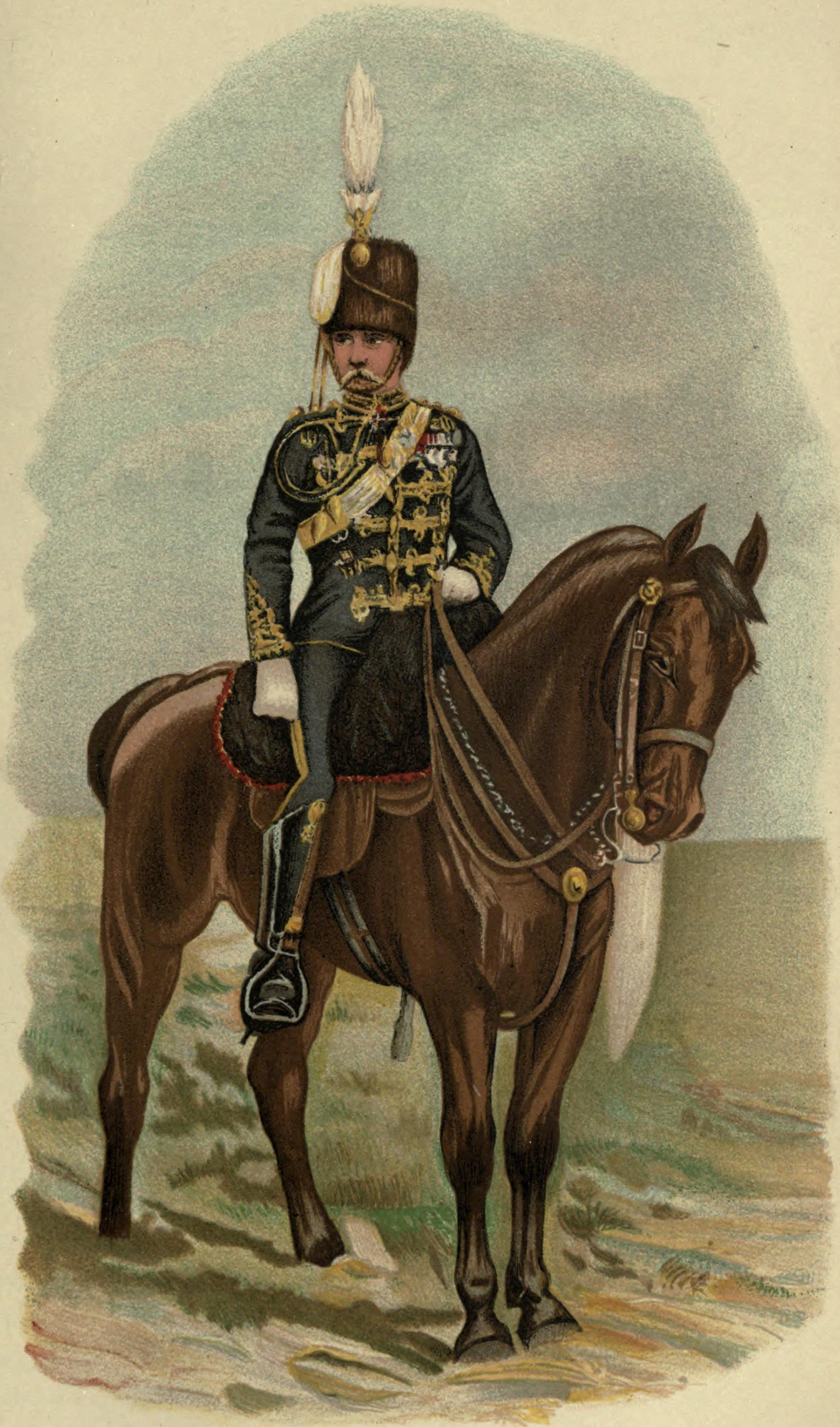
An officer of the 19th Hussars, 1882

The regiment saw action at Battle of Tel el-Kebir in September 1882 during the Anglo-Egyptian War and the regiment took possession of the wells, which were a vital resource in desert warfare, at the Battle of Abu Klea in January 1885 during the Mahdist War. It also fought at the Siege of Ladysmith in winter 1899 during the Second Boer War. The regiment was titled the 19th (Alexandra, Princess of Wales's Own) Hussars after Alexandra, Princess of Wales in 1902 and, when Alexandra became Queen Consort in 1908, the name changed to the 19th (Queen Alexandra's Own Royal) Hussars.

=== First World War ===
With the outbreak of the First World War, the regiment was split up, with squadrons attached to the 4th, 5th and 6th Infantry Divisions as divisional cavalry squadrons; all three divisions moved to France with the British Expeditionary Force, and saw action in the Battle of Le Cateau in August 1914, the Retreat from Mons later that month, the Battle of the Marne in September 1914, the Battle of the Aisne later that month and the Battle of Armentières in October 1914.

The regiment was brought together again in April 1915, and attached to the 9th Cavalry Brigade in the 1st Cavalry Division, with whom it served for the remainder of the war. It saw action at the Second Battle of Ypres in spring 1915, gaining battle honours for the Battle of St Julien in April 1915 and the Battle of Frezenberg in May 1915. The regiment went on to fight at the Battle of Flers–Courcelette in September 1916, part of the Battle of the Somme. It also served at the Battle of Cambrai in November 1917, at the Battle of Amiens in August 1918 and at the Pursuit to Mons in autumn 1918.

The regiment was retitled 19th Royal Hussars (Queen Alexandra's Own) in 1921 and shortly thereafter disbanded when stationed in Muttra, India, as part of the post-War reduction in forces. Most of the officers and men were transferred to other cavalry regiments in India, and a cadre was briefly resurrected in 1922 in order to amalgamate with the 15th The King's Hussars, to form the 15th/19th The King's Royal Hussars.

== Regimental museum ==
The regimental collection is held by the Discovery Museum in Newcastle upon Tyne.

== Battle honours ==
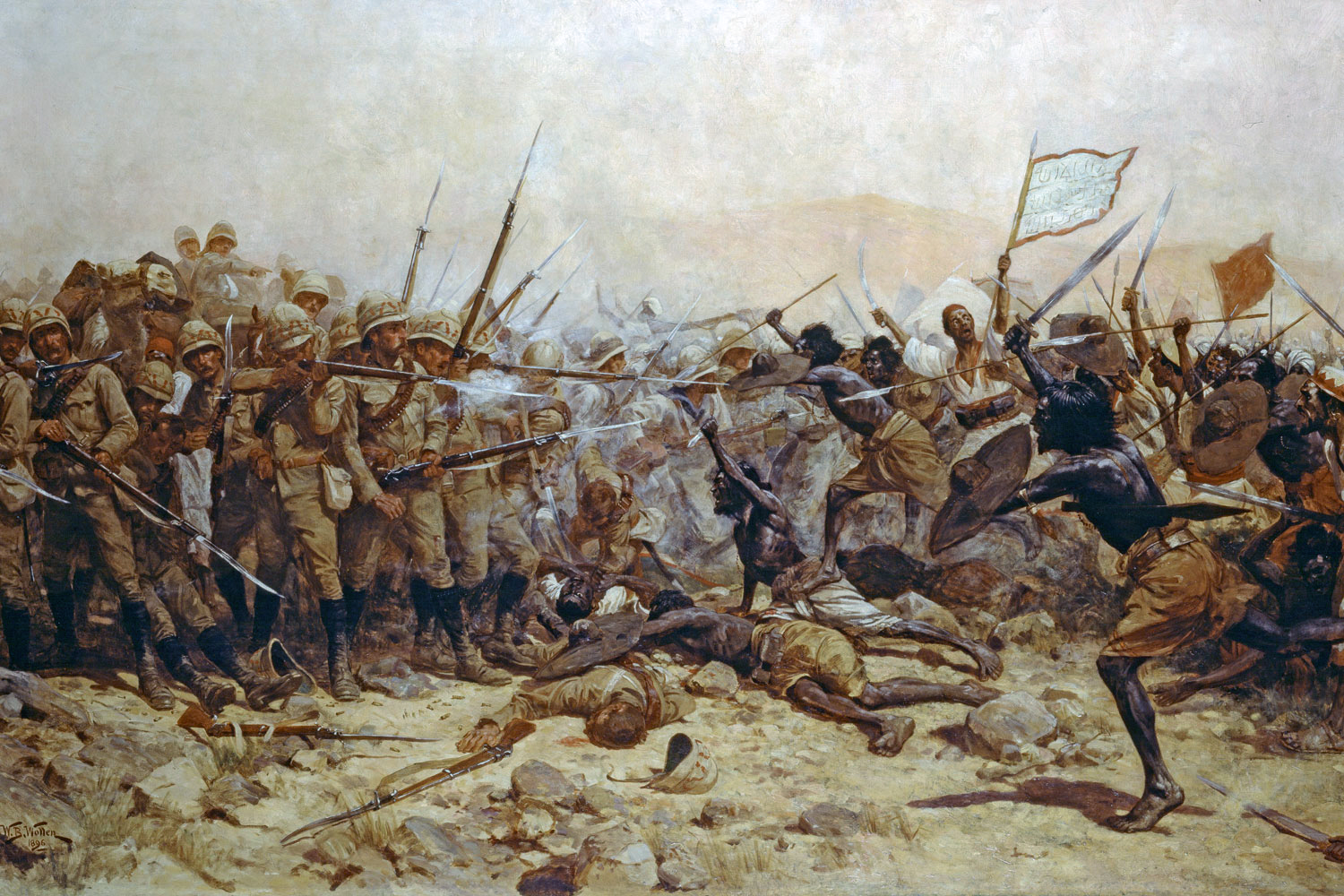
The Battle of Abu Klea at which the 19th Royal Hussars successfully secured the wells, in January 1885, William Barnes Wollen

The regiment’s battle honours were as follows:

- Early wars: Mysore, Seringapatam, Assaye, Niagara, Tel-el-Kebir, Egypt 1882 '84, Abu Klea, Nile 1884-85, Defence of Ladysmith, South Africa 1899-1902
- The Great War: Le Cateau, Retreat from Mons, Marne 1914, Aisne 1914, Armentières 1914, Ypres 1915, Frezenberg, Bellewaarde, Somme 1916 '18, Flers-Courcelette, Cambrai 1917 '18, St Quentin, Rosières, Amiens, Albert 1918, Bapaume 1918, Hindenburg Line, St Quentin Canal, Beaurevoir, Pursuit to Mons, France and Flanders 1914-18

== Victoria Cross ==
- William Thomas Marshall, Quartermaster Sergeant in the Sudan campaign, 29 February 1884

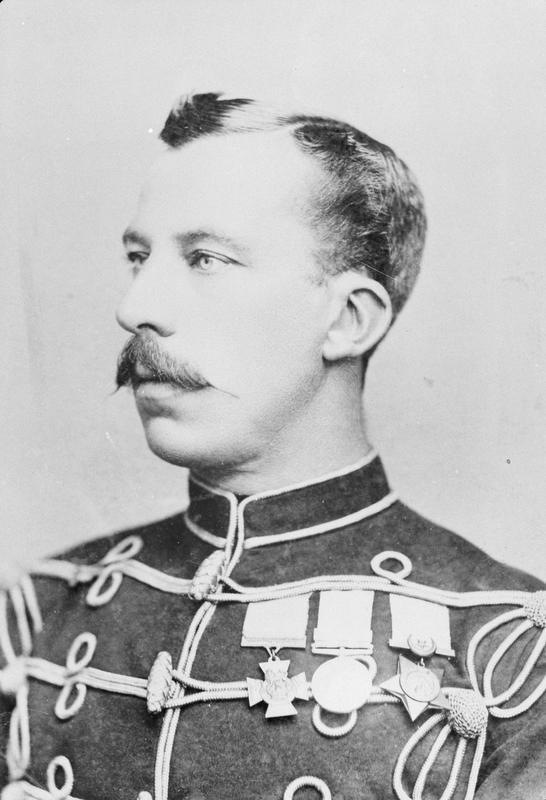
William Thomas Marshall VC

== Colonel-in-Chief ==
- 1914: Queen Alexandra (died 1925)

== Regimental colonels ==
Colonels of the regiment were:

1st Bengal European Light Cavalry (renamed 1st Bengal European Cavalry, 1859)

- 1858 Maj-Gen. Thomas Mathew Taylor

19th Hussars (1862)

- 1862–1865: Gen. William Pattle
- 1865–1872: Gen. John Hall
- 1872–1889: Gen. John Yorke, CB
- 1889–1902: Lt-Gen. Coote Synge-Hutchinson

19th (Alexandra, Princess of Wales's Own) Hussars, 1902 (renamed 19th (Queen Alexandra's Own Royal) Hussars, 1908 and 19th Royal Hussars (Queen Alexandra's Own), 1921)

- 1902–1921: F.M. Sir John Denton Pinkstone French, 1st Earl of Ypres, KP, GCB, OM, GCVO, KCMG (to 15th/19th The King's Royal Hussars)
- 1921 regiment disbanded
- one squadron re-formed and amalgamated with 15th The King's Hussars to form the 15th/19th Hussars

== See also ==
- British cavalry during the First World War
- White mutiny
