= 15th The King's Hussars =

Cavalry regiment of the British Army

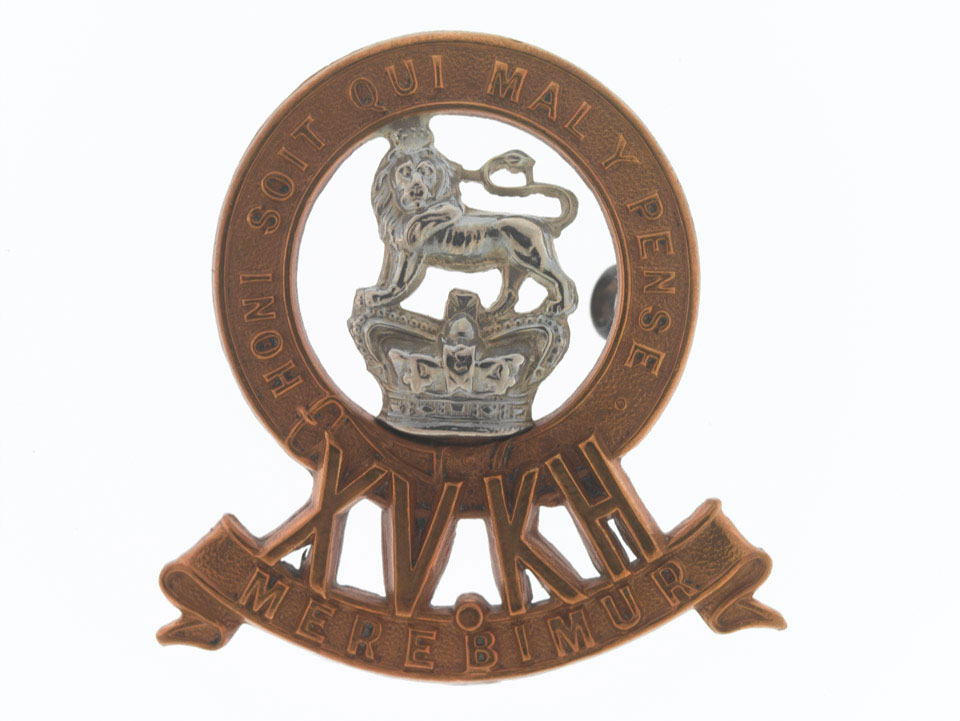
- c. 1900 regimental cap badge for other ranks
- Active: 1759–1922
- Country: Great Britain (1759–1800); United Kingdom (1801–1922)
- Branch: British Army
- Type: Line cavalry
- Size: Regiment
- Nicknames: Eliott's Light Horse; The Tabs
- Motto: Merebimur (We shall be Worthy) (Latin)
- Colours: Blue - Yellow - Red and Blue
- Anniversaries: Sahagún Day (21 December)

Commanders
- Notable commanders: George Augustus Eliott, 1st Baron Heathfield; Lieutenant General James Brudenell, 7th Earl of Cardigan; General Lord Robert Manners

Insignia
- Identification symbol: NCOs - Royal Crest

The 15th The King's Hussars was a cavalry regiment in the British Army. First raised in 1759, it saw service over two centuries, including the First World War, before being amalgamated with the 19th Royal Hussars into the 15th/19th The King's Royal Hussars in 1922.

== History ==
=== Early wars ===
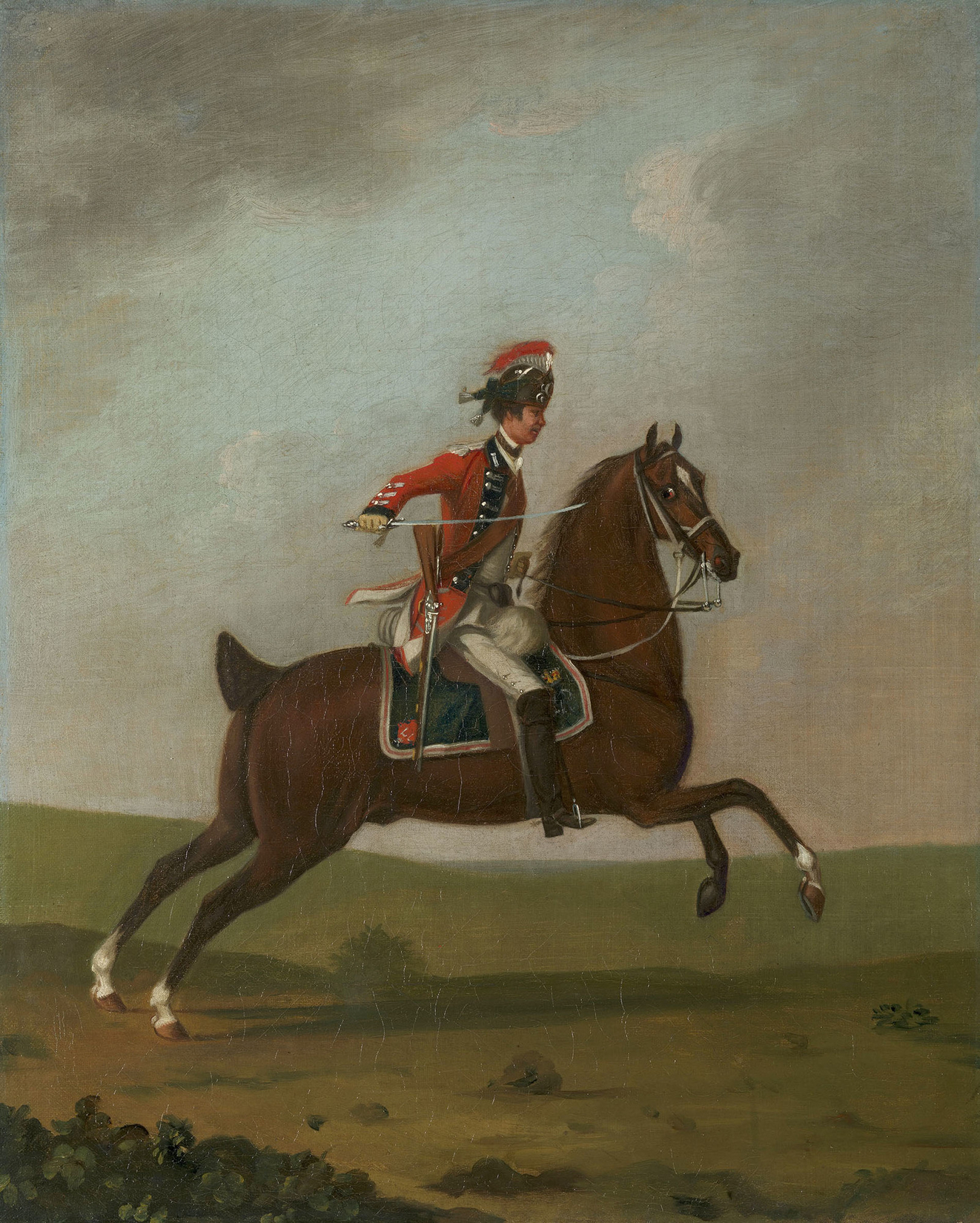
c. 1760 painting of a regimental private

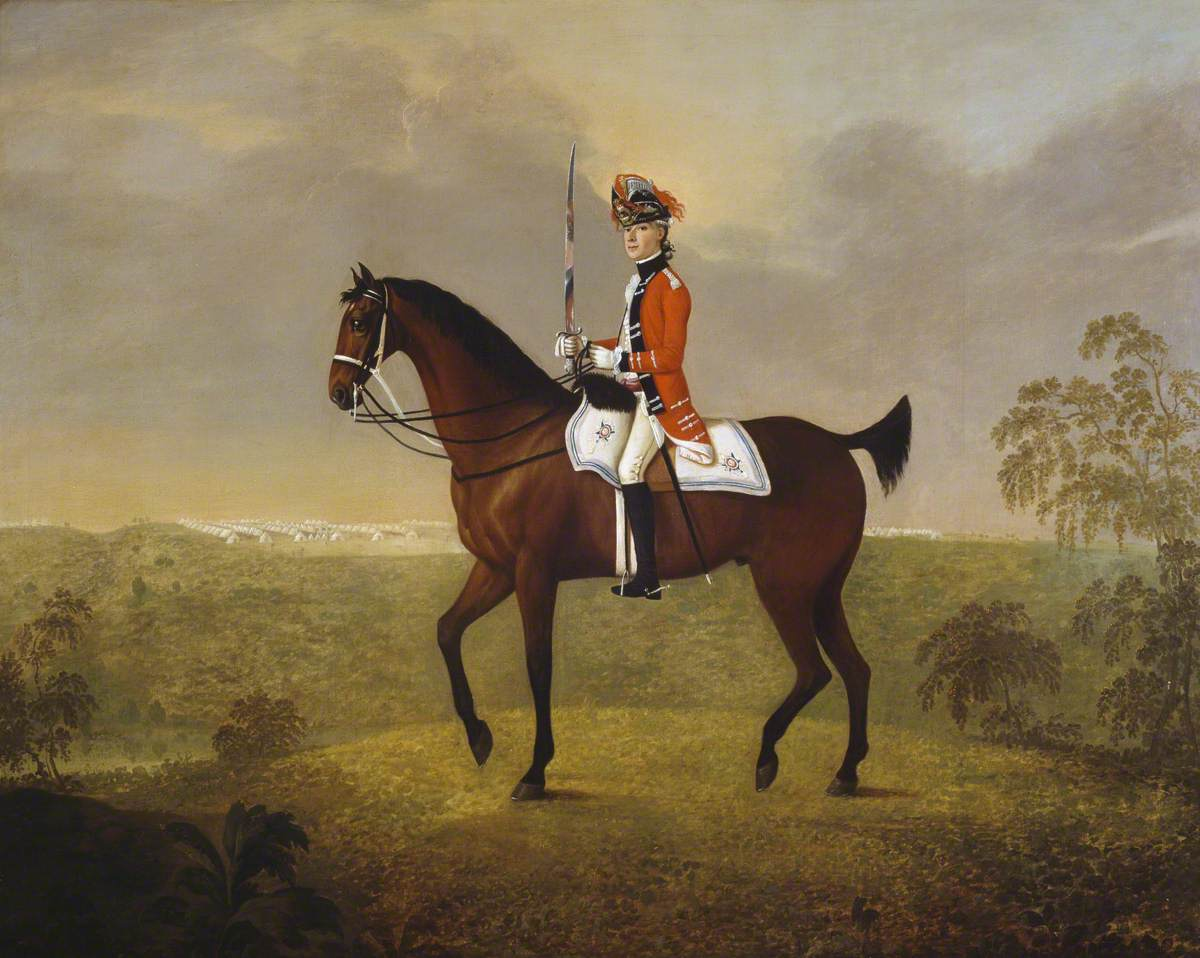
1780 painting of a regimental cornet

The regiment was raised in the London area by George Augustus Eliott, 1st Baron Heathfield as Elliots Light Horse as the first of the new regiments of light dragoons in 1759. It was renamed the 15th Regiment of (Light) Dragoons in 1760. The regiment landed in Bremen in June 1760 for service in the Seven Years' War. The regiment were largely responsible for the victory, suffering 125 of the 186 allied casualties at the Battle of Emsdorf in July 1760. Lieutenant Colonel William Erskine, commanding the regiment, presented King George III with 16 colours captured by his regiment after the battle. During the battle the French commander, Major-General Christian-Sigismund von Glaubitz, was taken prisoner. The regiment charged the French rear guard twice at the Battle of Wilhelmsthal in June 1762 and then returned home in July 1763. In 1766 it was renamed for King George III as the 1st (or The King's Royal) Regiment of Light Dragoons, the number being an attempt to create a new numbering system for the light dragoon regiments. Under this name it suppressed the Nottingham cheese riot in October 1766. However, the old system was quickly re-established, with the regiment being renamed as the 15th (The King's) Regiment of (Light) Dragoons in 1769.

The regiment landed at Ostend in May 1793 for service in the Flanders Campaign and fought at the Battle of Famars in May 1793. It formed part of the besieging force at the Siege of Valenciennes in June 1793 and formed part of the covering force at the Siege of Dunkirk in August 1793 and at the Siege of Landrecies in April 1794. It undertook successful charges at the Battle of Villers-en-Cauchies in April 1794 and at the Battle of Willems in May 1794 and was present, but not actively engaged, at the Battle of Tournay later in May 1794. The regiment returned to England in December 1795 and was next in action at the Battle of Alkmaar in October 1799 during the Anglo-Russian invasion of Holland.

=== Napoleonic Wars ===
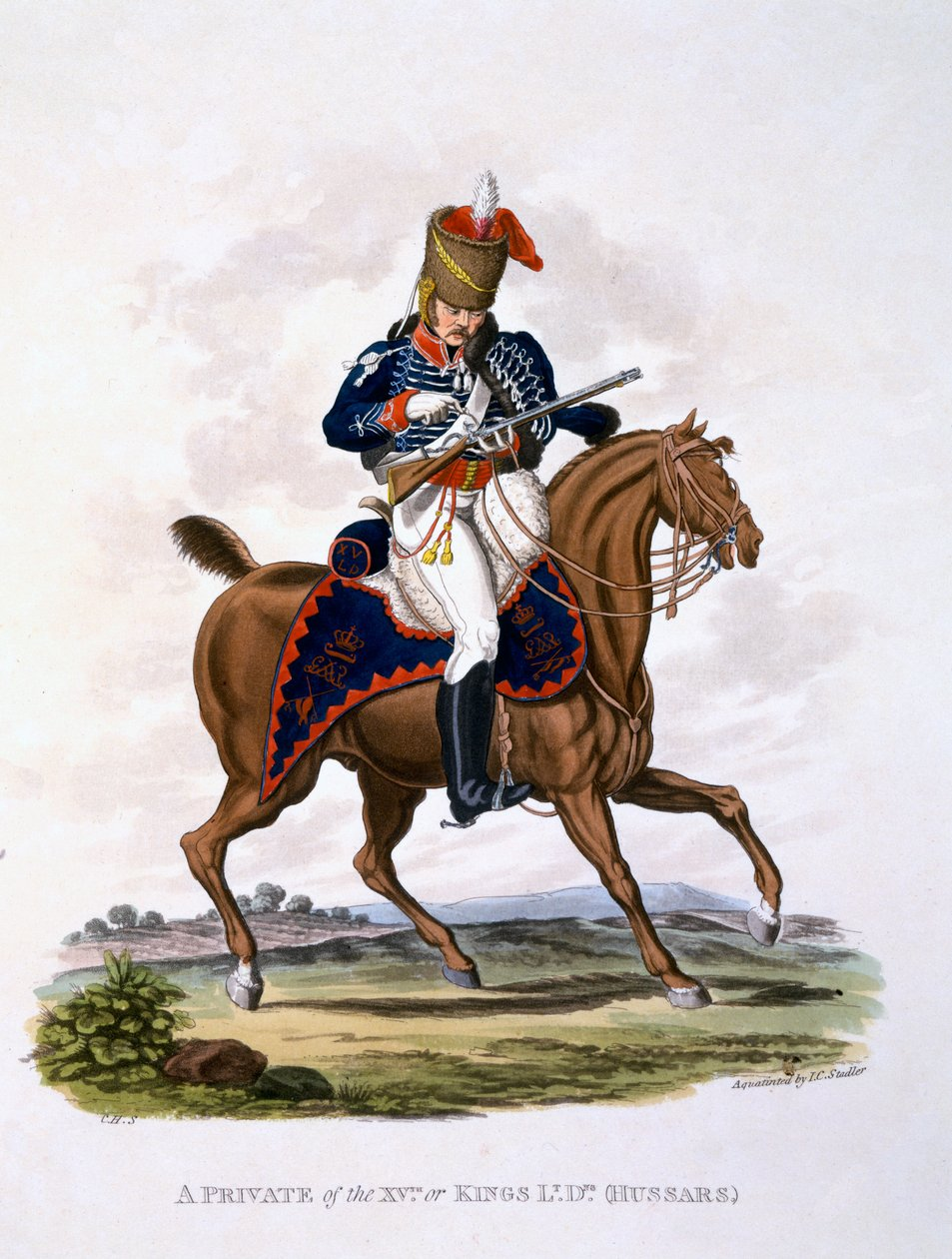
1812 engraving of a regimental private

The regiment was reconstituted as a hussar regiment in 1807 as the 15th (The King's) Regiment of (Light) Dragoons (Hussars). It landed at Corunna in November 1808 for service in the Peninsular War and defeated two regiments of French cavalry at the Battle of Sahagún in December 1808. At the battle two French lieutenant colonels were captured and the French 1st Provisional Chasseurs à cheval, who lost many men captured, ceased to exist as a viable regiment. However, the commanding officer of the 15th Hussars, Colonel Colquhoun Grant, was wounded in the battle. The regiment embarked at Corunna for their journey home in January 1809.

The regiment were ordered to support Sir Arthur Wellesley's Army on the Iberian Peninsula and landed at Lisbon in February 1813. It took part in the Battle of Morales in June 1813 and the Battle of Vitoria later in the month. It then pursued the French Army into France and supported the infantry at the Battle of Orthez in February 1814 and at the Battle of Toulouse in April 1814. It returned to England in July 1814. The regiment was recalled for the Hundred Days and landed at Ostend in May 1815: it took part in a charge at the Battle of Waterloo in June 1815 and returned to England in May 1816.

=== Peterloo ===
The regiment was involved in perpetrating the Peterloo Massacre in Manchester on 16 August 1819, when a 60,000-strong crowd calling for democratic reform were attacked by government troops. Panic from the crowd was interpreted as an attack nearby Yeomanry troops and the 15th Hussars, led by Lieutenant-colonel Guy L'Estrange, charged at the crowd along with other government soldiers. The charge resulted in 18 killed and between 400 and 700 injured.

=== Victorian era ===
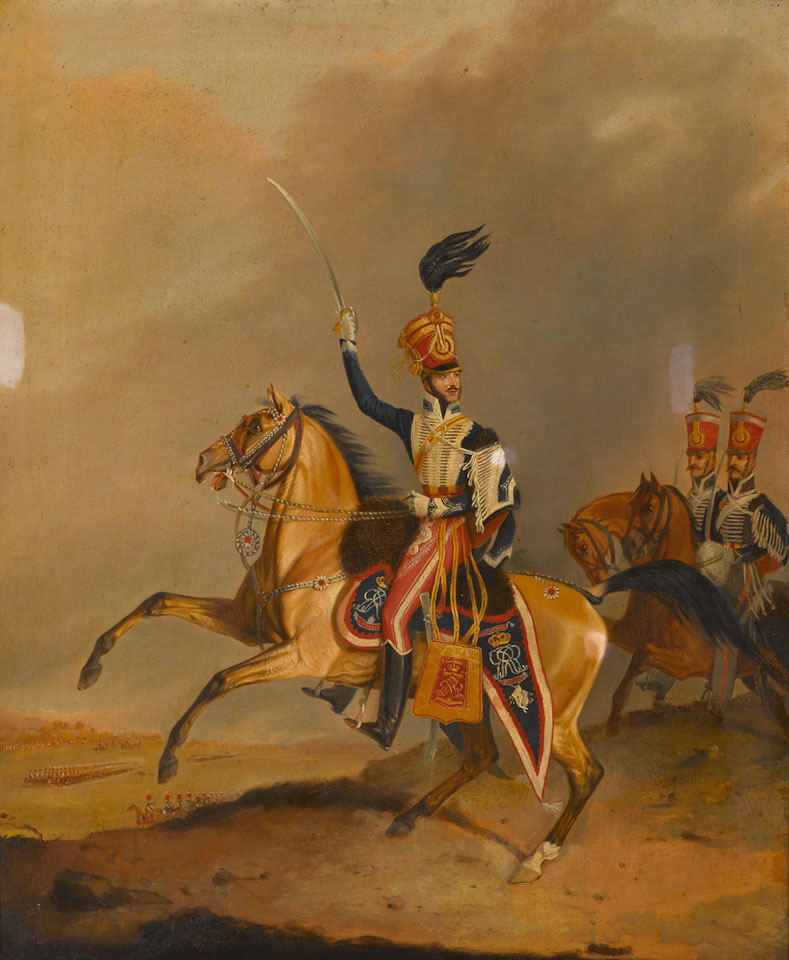
1825 painting of a regimental officer

The title of the regiment was simplified in 1861 to the 15th (The King's) Hussars. It was stationed in Ireland between July 1824 and May 1827 and between April 1834 and May 1837. It was then stationed in India between spring 1840 and 1854. The regiment returned to India in 1867 and moved on to Afghanistan in 1878 for service in the Second Anglo-Afghan War before being deployed to South Africa in January 1881 for service in the First Boer War.

In 1894, the 15th King's Hussars football team beat the Royal Irish Rifles in the Mid-Ulster Cup final. They beat them in a replay following a 3-3 draw. The rematch took place at Donacloney, County Down and they won 2-1.

=== First World War ===
The regiment, which was stationed at Longmoor at the start of the First World War, landed at Rouen in France on 18 August 1914: the squadrons were attached to different infantry divisions to form the divisional reconnaissance element: A Squadron was attached to 3rd Division, B Squadron was attached to 2nd Division and C Squadron was attached to 1st Division. On 14 April 1915, the squadrons returned to regimental control and the regiment was placed under the command of the 9th Cavalry Brigade in the 1st Cavalry Division. The regiment remained on the Western Front throughout the war. It participated in most of the major actions where cavalry were used as a mounted mobile force. They were also used as dismounted troops and served effectively as infantry. On 11 November 1918, orders were received that the 1st Cavalry Division would lead the advance of the Second Army into Germany, by 6 December 1918, having passed through Namur, the division secured the Rhine bridgehead at Cologne.

=== Post war ===
After service in the First World War, the regiment, retitled as the 15th The King's Hussars in 1921 was amalgamated with the 19th Royal Hussars into the 15th/19th The King's Royal Hussars in 1922.

== Regimental museum ==
The regimental collection is held by the Discovery Museum in Newcastle upon Tyne.

== Battle honours ==
The regiment was awarded the following battle honours:

- Early wars: Emsdorf, Villers-en-Cauchies, Willems, Egmont-op-Zee, Sahagun, Vittoria, Peninsula, Waterloo, Afghanistan 1878-80
- The Great War: Mons, Retreat from Mons, Marne 1914, Aisne 1914, Ypres 1914 '15, Langemarck 1914, Gheluvelt, Nonne Bosschen, Frezenberg, Bellewaarde, Somme 1916 '18, Flers-Courcelette, Cambrai 1917 '18, St. Quentin, Rosières, Amiens, Albert 1918, Bapaume 1918, Hindenburg Line, St. Quentin Canal, Beaurevoir, Pursuit to Mons, France and Flanders 1914-18

== Victoria Cross ==
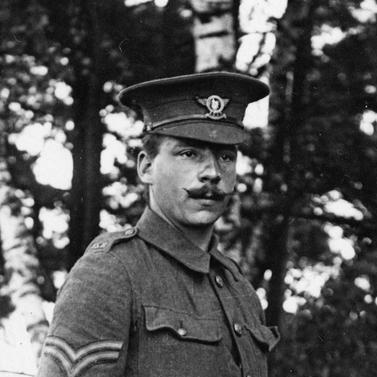
Charles Ernest Garforth V.C.

- Charles Ernest Garforth, Corporal, First World War 23 August 1914

== Regimental Colonels ==
Colonels of the regiment were:

William Newton's Regiment of Dragoons (ranked as 15th Dragoons)

- 1715–1718: Col. William Newton
- 1718 Regiment disbanded

Duke of Kingston's Regiment of Light Horse (ranked as 10th Horse)

- 1745–1748: Gen. Evelyn Pierrepont, 2nd Duke of Kingston-upon-Hull

15th Light Horse, or Duke of Cumberland's Dragoons (1748)

- 1748: Gen. Lord Robert Manners
- 1748 Regiment disbanded

15th (or Light) Regiment of Dragoons (1759)

- 1759–1790: Gen. George Augustus Eliott, 1st Baron Heathfield

15th (The King's) Regiment of (Light) Dragoons (1769)

- 1790–1801: Gen. Sir Guy Carleton, 1st Baron Dorchester, KB
- 1801–1827: F.M. HRH Ernest Augustus, Duke of Cumberland, KG, KP, GCB, GCH (later King of Hanover)

15th (The King's) Regiment of (Light) Dragoons (Hussars) (1807)

- 1827–1835: Lt-Gen. Sir Colquhoun Grant, KCB, GCH
- 1835–1849: Gen. Sir Robert Wilson, KC
- 1849–1859: Gen. Sir Thomas William Brotherton, GCB
- 1859–1871: Gen. Everard William Bouverie

15th (The King's) Hussars (1861)

- 1871–1883: Gen. George William Key
- 1883–1891: Gen. Michael William Smith, CB
- 1891–1904: Lt-Gen. Sir Frederick Wellington John FitzWygram, Bt.
- 1904–1916: Gen. Sir George Luck, GCB
- 1916–1922: Gen. Sir William Eliot Peyton, KCB, KCVO, DSO
- 1922: Regiment amalgamated with the disbanded 19th Royal Hussars (Queen Alexandra's Own) to form the 15th/19th Hussars.

== See also ==
- British cavalry during the First World War

== Sources ==
- Cannon, Richard (1841). Historical Record of the Fifteenth or the King's Regiment of Light Dragoons, Hussars containing an account of the formation of the regiment in 1759 and of its subsequent services to 1841. John W. Parker.
- Fletcher, Ian (1999). Galloping at Everything. Staplehurst. ISBN 1-86227-016-3.
- Reid, Robert (1989). The Peterloo Massacre. William Heinemann. ISBN 978-0-434-62901-5.
- Savory, Reginald (1966). His Britannic Majesty's Army in Germany During the Seven Years War. Oxford University Press.
