= British Expeditionary Force order of battle (1914) =

World War I order of battle

The British Expeditionary Force order of battle 1914, as originally despatched to France in August and September 1914, at the beginning of World War I. The British Army prior to World War I traced its origins to the increasing demands of imperial expansion together with inefficiencies highlighted during the Crimean War, which led to the Cardwell and Childers Reforms of the late 19th century. These gave the British Army its modern shape, and defined its regimental system. The Haldane Reforms of 1907 formally created an Expeditionary force and the Territorial Force.

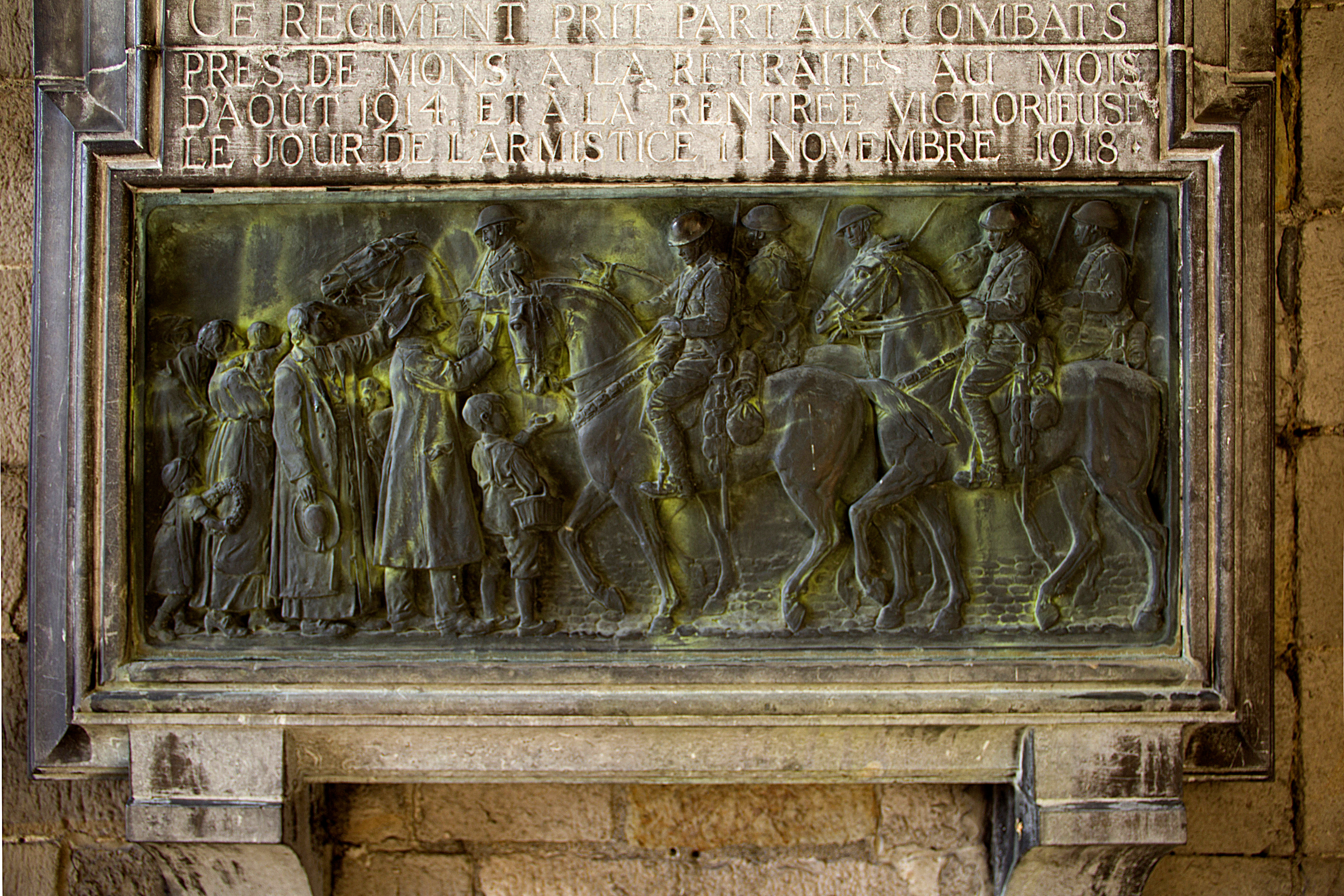
Memorial dedicated to the regiment of the British Expeditionary Force who took part in the fighting sequence near Mons, Belgium.

The British Army was different from the French and German Armies at the beginning of the conflict in that it was made up of professional soldiers who had volunteered, rather than conscripts. It was also considerably smaller than its French and German counterparts.

The outbreak of the First World War in August 1914 saw the bulk of the changes in the Haldane reforms put to the test. The British Expeditionary Force (BEF) of six divisions was quickly sent to the Continent.

This order of battle includes all combat units, including engineer and artillery units, but not medical, supply and signal units. Commanders are listed for all formations of brigade size or higher, and for significant staff positions.

== Plans for the Expeditionary Force ==
Under pre-war plans, an expeditionary force was to be organised from among the Regular Army forces in the United Kingdom, with a strength of six infantry divisions and one cavalry division (72 infantry battalions and 14 cavalry regiments), plus support units.

It was planned that the seven divisions would be centrally controlled by General Headquarters and as such no plans were made for intermediate levels of command. One corps staff was maintained in peacetime, but the decision was made on mobilisation to create a second (and later a third) in order to better conform with the French command structure; both of these had to be improvised.

At the time of mobilisation, there were significant fears of a German landing in force on the English east coast, and as such the decision was taken to hold back two divisions for home defence, and only send four, plus the cavalry division, to France for the present. The 4th was eventually despatched at the end of August, and the 6th in early September.

== GHQ ==
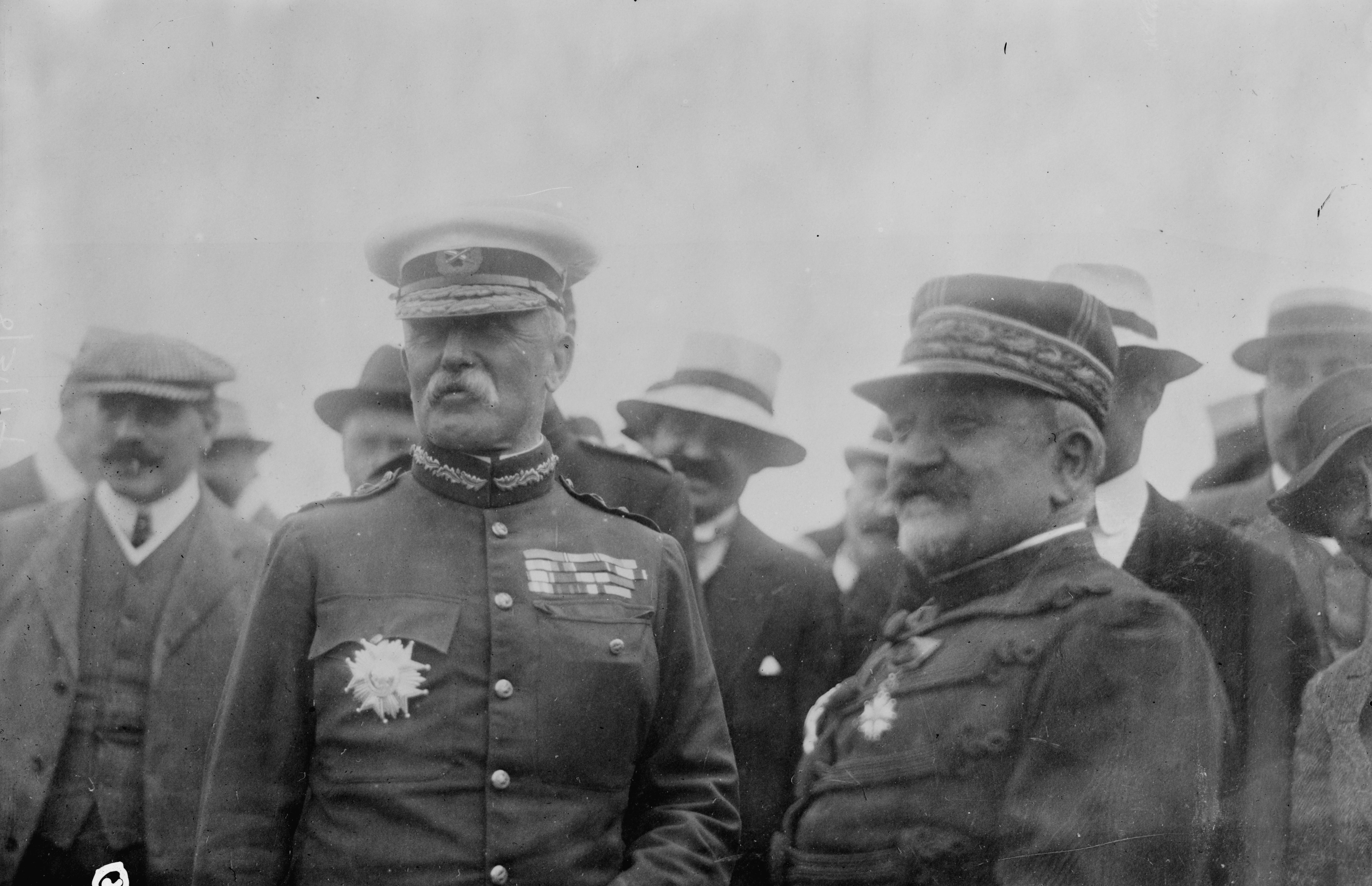
Field-Marshal John French centre left

The initial commander-in-chief of the BEF was Field-Marshal Sir John French. His chief of staff was Lieutenant-General Sir A. J. Murray, with Major-General H. H. Wilson as his deputy. GSO 1 (Operations) was Colonel G. M. Harper, and GSO 1 (Intelligence) was Colonel G. M. W. Macdonogh.

The adjutant-general was Major-General Sir C. F. N. Macready, with Major-General E. R. C. Graham as deputy adjutant-general and Colonel A. E. J. Cavendish as assistant adjutant-general. The quartermaster-general was Major-General Sir W. R. Robertson, with Colonel C. T. Dawkins as assistant quartermaster-general. The Royal Artillery was commanded by Major-General W. F. L. Lindsay, and the Royal Engineers by Brigadier-General G. H. Fowke.

=== GHQ Troops, Royal Engineers ===
General Headquarters Troops controlled the army group engineers. It had the following structure in 1914:

- 1st Bridging Train, Royal Engineers
- 2nd Bridging Train, Royal Engineers
- 1st Siege Company, Royal Monmouthshire Militia, Royal Engineers
- 4th Siege Company, Royal Monmouthshire Militia, Royal Engineers
- 1st Siege Company, Royal Anglesey Royal Engineers
- 2nd Siege Company, Royal Anglesey Royal Engineers
- 1st Ranging Section, Royal Engineers
- Railway Transport Establishment
  - 8th Railway Company, Royal Engineers
  - 10th Railway Company, Royal Engineers
  - 2nd Railway Company, Royal Monmouthshire Militia, Royal Engineers
  - 3rd Railway Company, Royal Monmouthshire Militia, Royal Engineers
  - 3rd Railway Company, Royal Anglesey Royal Engineers
- 29th General Headquarters Troops Company, Royal Engineers
- 20th Fortress Company, Royal Engineers
- 25th Fortress Company, Royal Engineers
- 31st Fortress Company, Royal Engineers
- 42nd Fortress Company, Royal Engineers
- 1st Printing Company, Royal Engineers

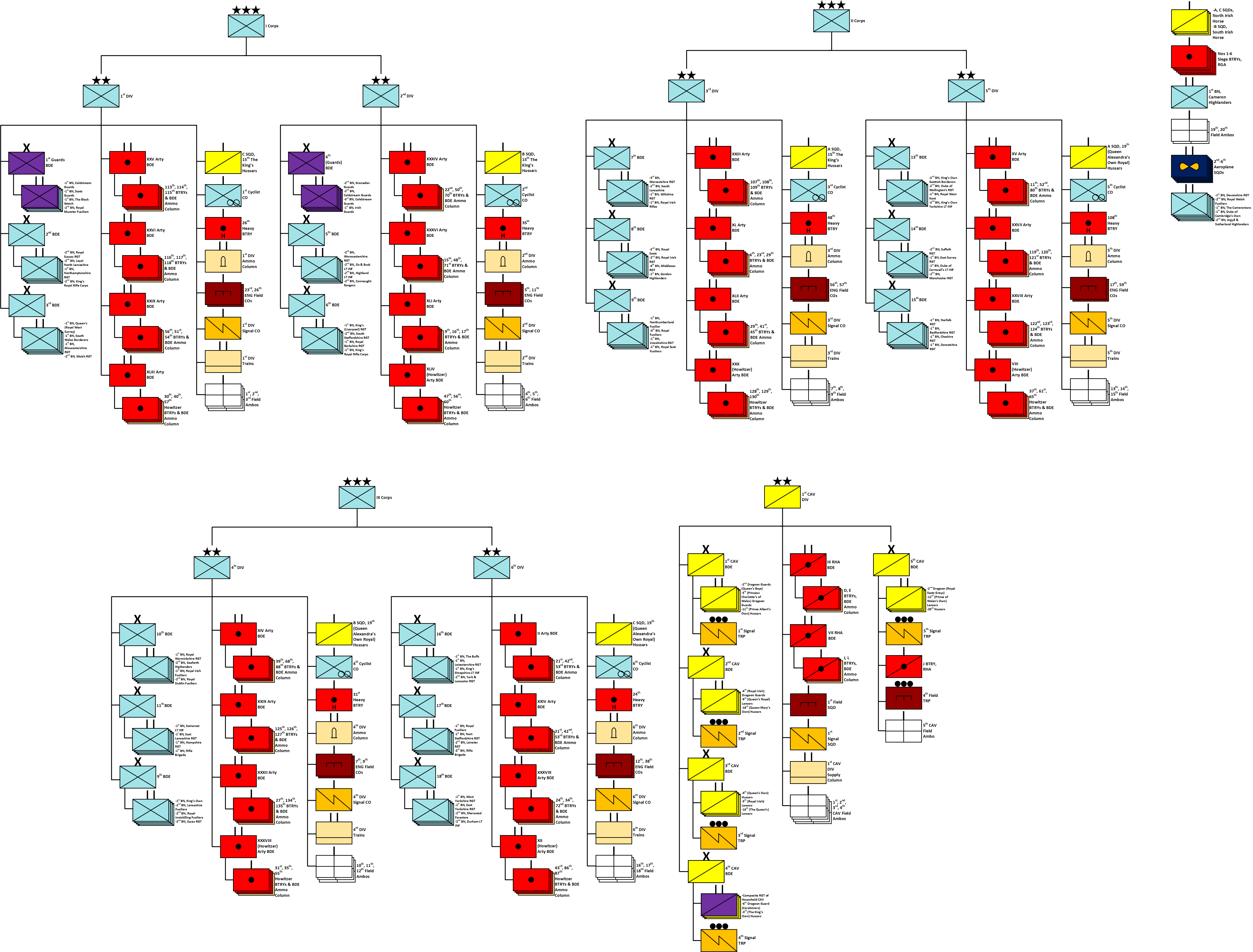
British Expeditionary Force 1914

== Cavalry ==
There was no permanently established cavalry division in the British Army; on mobilisation, the 1st through to 4th Cavalry Brigades were grouped together to form a division, whilst the 5th Cavalry Brigade remained as an independent unit.

On 6 September, the 3rd Cavalry Brigade was detached to act jointly with the 5th, under the overall command of Brigadier-General Gough. This force was re-designated the 2nd Cavalry Division on 16 September.

=== Cavalry Division ===
The Cavalry Division was commanded by Major-General Edmund Allenby, with Colonel John Vaughan as GSO 1 and Brigadier-General B. F. Drake commanding the Royal Horse Artillery.

- 1st Cavalry Brigade (Brigadier-General C. J. Briggs)
  - 2nd Dragoon Guards (Queen's Bays)
  - 5th (Princess Charlotte of Wales's) Dragoon Guards
  - 11th (Prince Albert's Own) Hussars
- 2nd Cavalry Brigade (Brigadier-General H. de Lisle)
  - 4th (Royal Irish) Dragoon Guards
  - 9th (Queen's Royal) Lancers
  - 18th (Queen Mary's Own) Hussars
- 3rd Cavalry Brigade (Brigadier-General H. de la P. Gough)
  - 4th (Queen's Own) Hussars
  - 5th (Royal Irish) Lancers
  - 16th (The Queen's) Lancers
- 4th Cavalry Brigade (Brigadier-General Hon. C. E. Bingham)
  - Household Cavalry Composite Regiment
  - 6th Dragoon Guards (Carabiners)
  - 3rd (King's Own) Hussars
- Divisional troops:
  - III Brigade RHA
    - D Battery, RHA
    - E Battery, RHA
  - VII Brigade RHA
    - I Battery, RHA
    - L Battery, RHA
  - 1st Field Squadron, RE

=== Independent brigade ===
- 5th Cavalry Brigade (Brigadier-General Sir P. W. Chetwode)
  - 2nd Dragoons (Royal Scots Greys)
  - 12th (Prince of Wales's Royal) Lancers
  - 20th Hussars
  - J Battery, RHA

== I Corps ==
I Corps was commanded by Lieutenant-General Sir Douglas Haig. His senior staff officers were Brigadier-General J. E. Gough (Chief of Staff), Brigadier-General H. S. Horne (commanding Royal Artillery) and Brigadier-General S. R. Rice (commanding Royal Engineers).

=== 1st Division ===
The 1st Division was commanded by Major General Samuel Lomax, with Colonel Robert Fanshawe as GSO1. Brigadier General Neil Douglas Findlay commanded the division's Royal Artillery, and Lieutenant-Colonel A. L. Schreiber commanded the Royal Engineers.

- 1st (Guards) Brigade (Brigadier General Ivor Maxse)
  - 1st Battalion, Coldstream Guards
  - 1st Battalion, Scots Guards
  - 1st Battalion, Black Watch (Royal Highlanders)
  - 2nd Battalion, Royal Munster Fusiliers
- 2nd Infantry Brigade (Brigadier General Edward Bulfin)
  - 2nd Battalion, Royal Sussex Regiment
  - 1st Battalion, Loyal North Lancashire Regiment
  - 1st Battalion, Northamptonshire Regiment
  - 2nd Battalion, King's Royal Rifle Corps
- 3rd Infantry Brigade (Brigadier General Herman Landon)
  - 1st Battalion, Queen's (Royal West Surrey Regiment)
  - 1st Battalion, South Wales Borderers
  - 1st Battalion, Gloucestershire Regiment
  - 2nd Battalion, Welch Regiment
- Divisional Troops
  - Mounted Troops
    - A Squadron, 15th (The King's) Hussars
    - 1st Cyclist Company
  - Artillery
    - XXV Brigade RFA
      - 113th Battery, RFA
      - 114th Battery, RFA
      - 115th Battery, RFA
    - XXVI Brigade RFA
      - 116th Battery, RFA
      - 117th Battery, RFA
      - 118th Battery, RFA
    - XXXIX Brigade RFA
      - 46th Battery, RFA
      - 51st Battery, RFA
      - 54th Battery, RFA
    - XLIII (Howitzer) Brigade RFA
      - 30th (Howitzer) Battery, RFA
      - 40th (Howitzer) Battery, RFA
      - 57th (Howitzer) Battery, RFA
    - 26th Heavy Battery, RGA
  - Engineers
    - 23rd Field Company, RE
    - 26th Field Company, RE

=== 2nd Division ===
2nd Division was commanded by Major-General C. C. Monro, with Colonel Hon. F. Gordon as GSO 1. Brigadier-General E. M. Perceval commanded the Royal Artillery, and Lieutenant-Colonel R. H. H. Boys commanded the Royal Engineers.

- 4th (Guards) Brigade (Brigadier-General Robert Scott-Kerr)
  - 2nd Battalion, Grenadier Guards
  - 2nd Battalion, Coldstream Guards
  - 3rd Battalion, Coldstream Guards
  - 1st Battalion, Irish Guards
- 5th Infantry Brigade (Brigadier-General Richard Haking)
  - 2nd Battalion, The Worcestershire Regiment
  - 2nd Battalion, The Oxfordshire and Buckinghamshire Light Infantry
  - 2nd Battalion, The Highland Light Infantry
  - 2nd Battalion, The Connaught Rangers
- 6th Infantry Brigade (Brigadier-General R. H. Davies, New Zealand Staff Corps)
  - 1st Battalion, The King's (Liverpool Regiment)
  - 2nd Battalion, The South Staffordshire Regiment
  - 1st Battalion, Princess Charlotte of Wales's (Royal Berkshire Regiment)
  - 1st Battalion, The King's Royal Rifle Corps
- Divisional Troops
  - Mounted Troops
    - B Squadron, 15th (The King's) Hussars
    - 2nd Cyclist Company
  - Artillery
    - XXXIV Brigade RFA
      - 22nd Battery, RFA
      - 50th Battery, RFA
      - 70th Battery, RFA
    - XXXVI Brigade RFA
      - 15th Battery, RFA
      - 48th Battery, RFA
      - 71st Battery, RFA
    - XLI Brigade RFA
      - 9th Battery, RFA
      - 16th Battery, RFA
      - 17th Battery, RFA
    - XLIV (Howitzer) Brigade RFA
      - 47th (Howitzer) Battery, RFA
      - 56th (Howitzer) Battery, RFA
      - 60th (Howitzer) Battery, RFA
    - 35th Heavy Battery, RGA
  - Engineers
    - 5th Field Company, RE
    - 11th Field Company, RE

== II Corps ==
II Corps was commanded by Lieutenant-General Sir James Grierson. His senior staff officers were Brigadier-General George Forestier-Walker (Chief of Staff), Brigadier-General A. H. Short (commanding Royal Artillery) and Brigadier-General A. E. Sandbach (commanding Royal Engineers).

Lieutenant-General Grierson died on a train between Rouen and Amiens on 17 August; General Sir Horace Smith-Dorrien took over command at Bavai, on 21 August at 4pm.

=== 3rd Division ===
3rd Division was commanded by Major-General Hubert I. W. Hamilton, with Colonel F. R. F. Boileau as GSO 1. Brigadier-General F. D. V. Wing commanded the Royal Artillery, and Lieutenant-Colonel C. S. Wilson commanded the Royal Engineers.

- 7th Infantry Brigade (Brigadier-General F. W. N. McCracken)
  - 3rd Battalion, The Worcestershire Regiment
  - 2nd Battalion, The Prince of Wales's Volunteers (South Lancashire Regiment)
  - 1st Battalion, The Duke of Edinburgh's (Wiltshire Regiment)
  - 2nd Battalion, The Royal Irish Rifles
- 8th Infantry Brigade (Brigadier-General B. J. C. Doran)
  - 2nd Battalion, The Royal Scots (Lothian Regiment)
  - 2nd Battalion, The Royal Irish Regiment
  - 4th Battalion, The Duke of Cambridge's Own (Middlesex Regiment)
  - 1st Battalion, The Gordon Highlanders

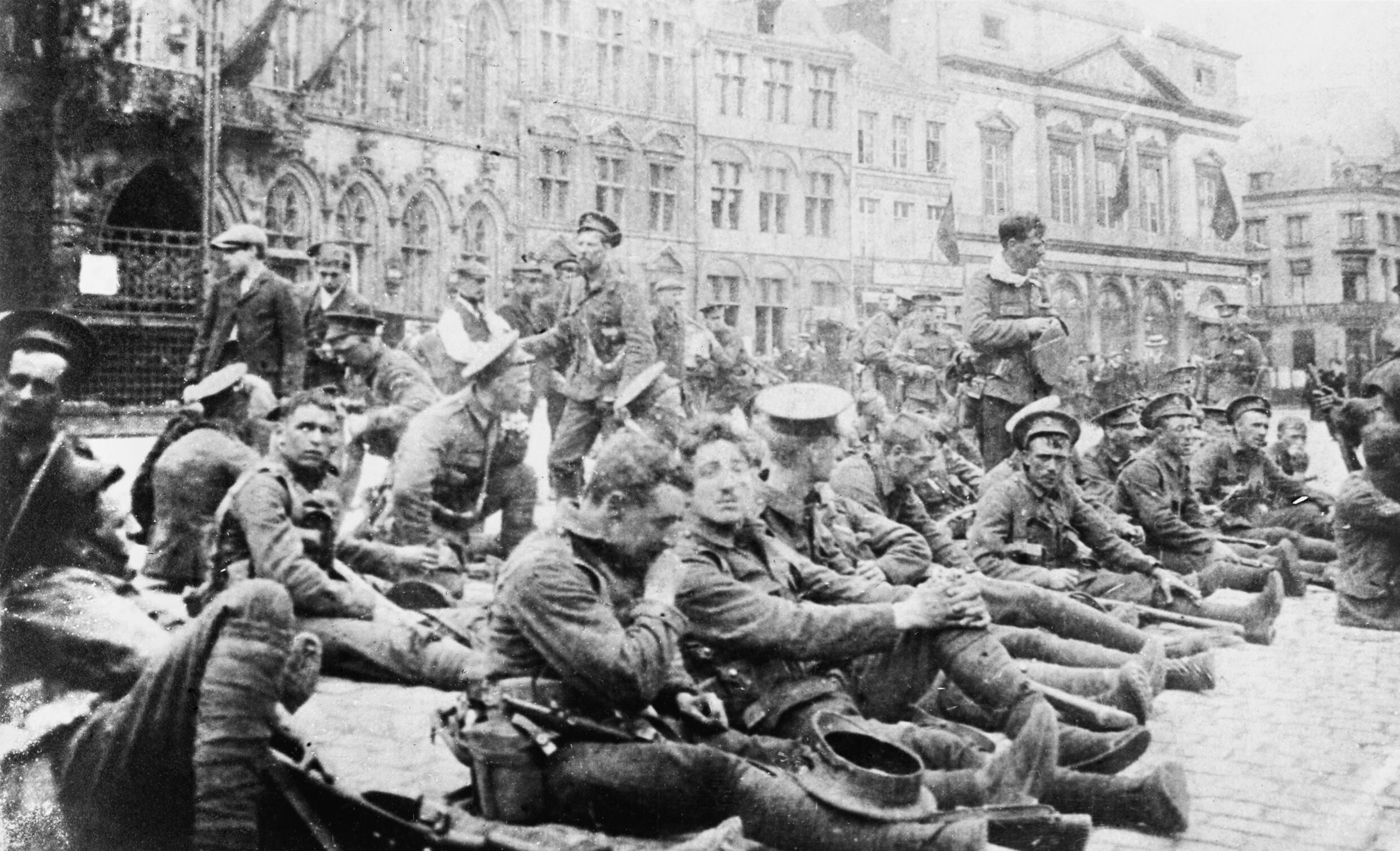
Men of 4th/Royal Fusiliers, 9th Brigade, resting before the Battle of Mons, 22 August 1914

- 9th Infantry Brigade (Brigadier-General F. C. Shaw)
  - 1st Battalion, The Northumberland Fusiliers
  - 4th Battalion, The Royal Fusiliers (City of London Regiment)
  - 1st Battalion, The Lincolnshire Regiment
  - 1st Battalion, The Royal Scots Fusiliers
- Divisional Troops
  - Mounted Troops
    - C Squadron, 15th (The King's) Hussars
    - 3rd Cyclist Company
  - Artillery
    - XXIII Brigade RFA
      - 107th Battery, RFA
      - 108th Battery, RFA
      - 109th Battery, RFA
    - XL Brigade RFA
      - 6th Battery, RFA
      - 23rd Battery, RFA
      - 49th Battery, RFA
    - XLII Brigade RFA
      - 29th Battery, RFA
      - 41st Battery, RFA
      - 45th Battery, RFA
    - XXX (Howitzer) Brigade RFA
      - 128th (Howitzer) Battery, RFA
      - 129th (Howitzer) Battery, RFA
      - 130th (Howitzer) Battery, RFA
    - 48th Heavy Battery, RGA
  - Engineers
    - 56th Field Company, RE
    - 57th Field Company, RE

=== 5th Division ===
5th Division was commanded by Major-General Sir C. Fergusson, with Lieutenant-Colonel C. F. Romer as GSO 1. Brigadier-General J. E. W. Headlam commanded the Royal Artillery, and Lieutenant-Colonel J. A. S. Tulloch commanded the Royal Engineers.

- 13th Infantry Brigade (Brigadier-General G. J. Cuthbert)
  - 2nd Battalion, The King's Own Scottish Borderers
  - 2nd Battalion, The Duke of Wellington's (West Riding Regiment)
  - 1st Battalion, The Queen's Own (Royal West Kent Regiment)
  - 2nd Battalion, The King's Own (Yorkshire Light Infantry)
- 14th Infantry Brigade (Brigadier-General S. P. Rolt)
  - 2nd Battalion, The Suffolk Regiment
  - 1st Battalion, The East Surrey Regiment
  - 1st Battalion, The Duke of Cornwall's Light Infantry
  - 2nd Battalion, The Manchester Regiment
- 15th Infantry Brigade (Brigadier-General A. E. W. Count Gleichen)
  - 1st Battalion, The Norfolk Regiment
  - 1st Battalion, The Bedfordshire Regiment
  - 1st Battalion, The Cheshire Regiment
  - 1st Battalion, The Dorsetshire Regiment
- Divisional Troops
  - Mounted Troops
    - A Squadron, 19th (Queen Alexandra's Own Royal) Hussars
    - 5th Cyclist Company
  - Artillery
    - XV Brigade RFA
      - 11th Battery, RFA
      - 52nd Battery, RFA
      - 80th Battery, RFA
    - XXVII Brigade RFA
      - 119th Battery, RFA
      - 120th Battery, RFA
      - 121st Battery, RFA
    - XXVIII Brigade RFA
      - 122nd Battery, RFA
      - 123rd Battery, RFA
      - 124th Battery, RFA
    - VIII (Howitzer) Brigade RFA
      - 37th (Howitzer) Battery, RFA
      - 61st (Howitzer) Battery, RFA
      - 65th (Howitzer) Battery, RFA
    - 108th Heavy Battery, RGA
  - Engineers
    - 17th Field Company, RE
    - 59th Field Company, RE

== III Corps ==
III Corps was formed in France on 31 August 1914, commanded by Major-General W. P. Pulteney. His senior staff officers were Brigadier-General J. P. Du Cane (Chief of Staff), Brigadier-General E. J. Phipps-Hornby (commanding Royal Artillery) and Brigadier-General F. M. Glubb (commanding Royal Engineers).

=== 4th Division ===
The 4th Division landed in France on the night of 22 August and 23. It was commanded by Major-General T. D'O. Snow, with Colonel J. E. Edmonds as GSO 1. Brigadier-General G. F. Milne commanded the Royal Artillery, and Lieutenant-Colonel H. B. Jones commanded the Royal Engineers.

- 10th Infantry Brigade (Brigadier-General J. A. L. Haldane)
  - 1st Battalion, The Royal Warwickshire Regiment
  - 2nd Battalion, Seaforth Highlanders (Ross-shire Buffs, The Duke of Albany's)
  - 1st Battalion, Princess Victoria's (Royal Irish Fusiliers)
  - 2nd Battalion, The Royal Dublin Fusiliers
- 11th Infantry Brigade (Brigadier-General A. G. Hunter-Weston)
  - 1st Battalion, Prince Albert's (Somerset Light Infantry)
  - 1st Battalion, The East Lancashire Regiment
  - 1st Battalion, The Hampshire Regiment
  - 1st Battalion, The Rifle Brigade (Prince Consort's Own)
- 12th Infantry Brigade (Brigadier-General H. F. M. Wilson)
  - 1st Battalion, King's Own (Royal Lancaster Regiment)
  - 2nd Battalion, The Lancashire Fusiliers
  - 2nd Battalion, The Royal Inniskilling Fusiliers
  - 2nd Battalion, The Essex Regiment
- Divisional Troops
  - Mounted Troops
    - B Squadron, 19th (Queen Alexandra's Own Royal) Hussars
    - 4th Cyclist Company
  - Artillery
    - XIV Brigade RFA
      - 39th Battery, RFA
      - 68th Battery, RFA
      - 88th Battery, RFA
    - XXIX Brigade RFA
      - 125th Battery, RFA
      - 126th Battery, RFA
      - 127th Battery, RFA
    - XXXII Brigade RFA
      - 27th Battery, RFA
      - 134th Battery, RFA
      - 135th Battery, RFA
    - XXXVII (Howitzer) Brigade RFA
      - 31st (Howitzer) Battery, RFA
      - 35th (Howitzer) Battery, RFA
      - 55th (Howitzer) Battery, RFA
    - 31st Heavy Battery, RGA
  - Engineers
    - 7th Field Company, RE
    - 9th Field Company, RE

=== 6th Division ===
The 6th Division embarked for France on 8 and 9 September. It was commanded by Major-General J. L. Keir, with Colonel W. T. Furse as GSO 1. Brigadier-General W. L. H. Paget commanded the Royal Artillery, and Lieutenant-Colonel G. C. Kemp commanded the Royal Engineers.

- 16th Infantry Brigade (Brigadier-General E. C. Ingouville-Williams)
  - 1st Battalion, The Buffs (East Kent Regiment)
  - 1st Battalion, The Leicestershire Regiment
  - 1st Battalion, The King's (Shropshire Light Infantry)
  - 2nd Battalion, The York and Lancaster Regiment
- 17th Infantry Brigade (Brigadier-General W. R. B. Doran)
  - 1st Battalion, The Royal Fusiliers (City of London Regiment)
  - 1st Battalion, The Prince of Wales's (North Staffordshire Regiment)
  - 2nd Battalion, The Prince of Wales's Leinster Regiment (Royal Canadians)
  - 3rd Battalion, The Rifle Brigade (The Prince Consort's Own)
- 18th Infantry Brigade (Brigadier-General W. N. Congreve)
  - 1st Battalion, The Prince of Wales's Own (West Yorkshire Regiment)
  - 1st Battalion, The East Yorkshire Regiment
  - 2nd Battalion, The Sherwood Foresters (Nottinghamshire and Derbyshire Regiment)
  - 2nd Battalion, The Durham Light Infantry
- Divisional Troops
  - Mounted Troops
    - C Squadron, 19th (Queen Alexandra's Own Royal) Hussars
    - 6th Cyclist Company
  - Artillery
    - II Brigade RFA
      - 21st Battery, RFA
      - 42nd Battery, RFA
      - 53rd Battery, RFA
    - XXIV Brigade RFA
      - 110th Battery, RFA
      - 111th Battery, RFA
      - 112th Battery, RFA
    - XXXVIII Brigade RFA
      - 24th Battery, RFA
      - 34th Battery, RFA
      - 72nd Battery, RFA
    - XII (Howitzer) Brigade RFA
      - 43rd (Howitzer) Battery, RFA
      - 86th (Howitzer) Battery, RFA
      - 87th (Howitzer) Battery, RFA
    - 24th Heavy Battery, RGA
  - Engineers
    - 12th Field Company, RE
    - 38th Field Company, RE

== Army troops ==
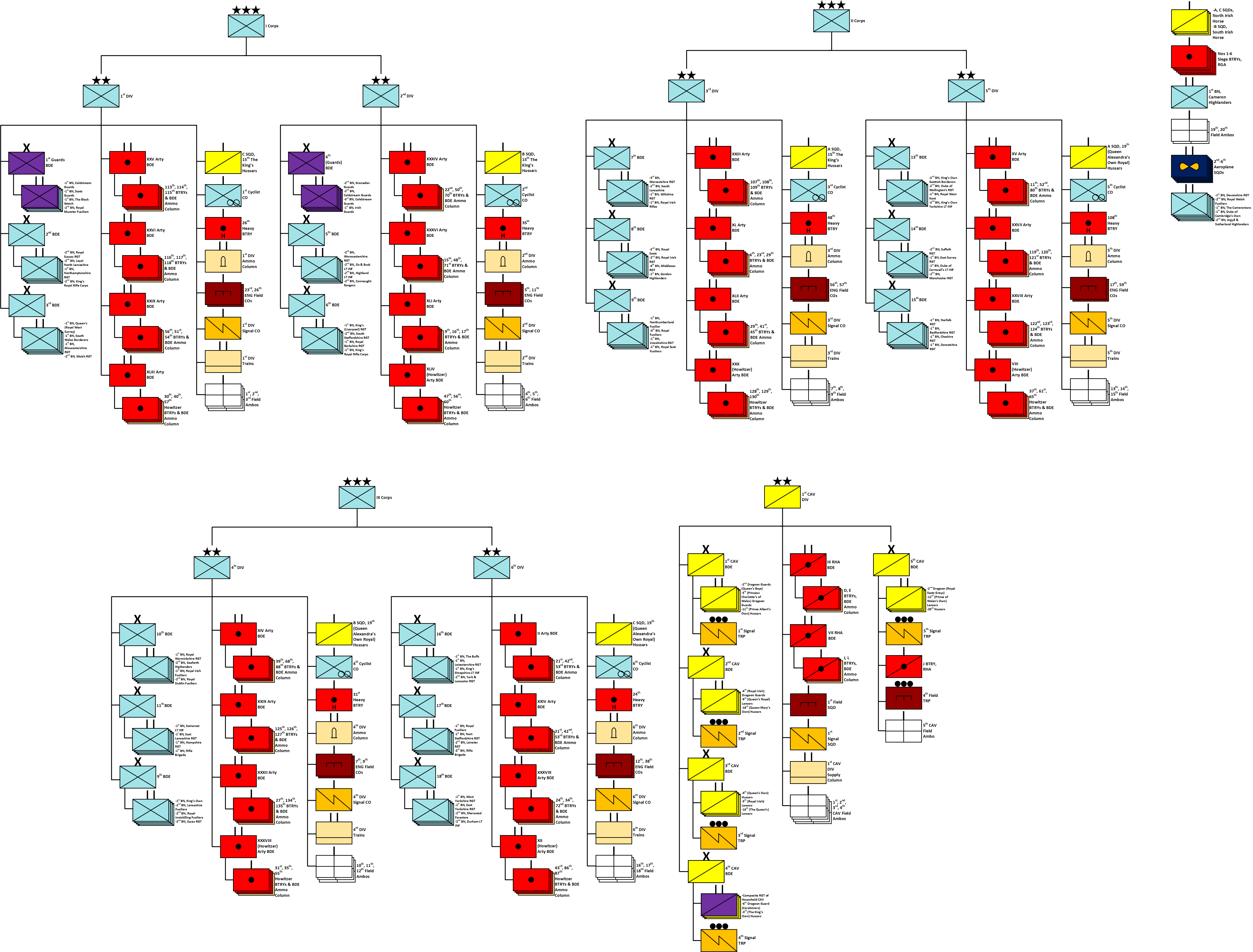
British Expeditionary Force 1914

- Mounted troops:
  - Composite Regiment drawn from the North Irish Horse (A and C Squadrons) and South Irish Horse (B Squadron).
- Siege Artillery:

(Royal Garrison Artillery units)

  - No. 1 Siege Battery
  - No. 2 Siege Battery
  - No. 3 Siege Battery
  - No. 4 Siege Battery
  - No. 5 Siege Battery
  - No. 6 Siege Battery
- Infantry:
  - 1st Battalion, The Queen's Own Cameron Highlanders

=== Royal Flying Corps ===
The Royal Flying Corps units in France were commanded by Brigadier-General Sir David Henderson, with Lieutenant-Colonel Frederick Sykes as his chief of staff.

- 2nd Aeroplane Squadron, Major C J Burke
- 3rd Aeroplane Squadron, Major J M Salmond
- 4th Aeroplane Squadron, Major G H Raleigh
- 5th Aeroplane Squadron, Major J F A Higgins
- 6th Aeroplane Squadron Major J H W Becke
- 1st Aircraft Park, Major A D Carden

=== Lines of communication defence troops ===
- 1st Battalion, The Devonshire Regiment
- 2nd Battalion, The Royal Welch Fusiliers
- 1st Battalion, The Cameronians (Scottish Rifles)
- 1st Battalion, The Duke of Cambridge's Own (Middlesex Regiment)
- 2nd Battalion, Princess Louise's (Argyll and Sutherland Highlanders)

== Unit strengths ==
A cavalry regiment contained three squadrons and was provided with two machine-guns. An infantry battalion contained four companies and two machine-guns.

A Royal Horse Artillery battery contained six 13-pounder guns, whilst a Royal Field Artillery battery contained six 18-pounder guns, or six 4.5-inch howitzers. A heavy battery of the Royal Garrison Artillery contained four 60 pounder guns and a siege battery contained four 6-inch 30 cwt. howitzers. Each battery had two ammunition wagons per gun, and each artillery brigade contained its own ammunition column.

Each division received an anti-aircraft detachment of 1-pounder pom-pom guns in September, attached to the divisional artillery.

The Cavalry Division had a total of 12 cavalry regiments in four brigades, and each infantry division had 12 battalions in three brigades. The strength of the Cavalry Division (not counting 5th Cavalry Brigade) came to 9,269 all ranks, with 9,815 horses, 24 13-pounder guns and 24 machine-guns. The strength of each infantry division came to 18,073 all ranks, with 5,592 horses, 76 guns and 24 machine-guns.

== Units not employed in the Expeditionary Force ==
In broad numeric terms, the British Expeditionary Force represented half the combat strength of the British Army; as an imperial power, a sizeable portion of the army had to be kept aside for overseas garrisons. Home defence was expected to be provided by the volunteers of the Territorial Force and by the reserves.

The total strength of the Regular Army in July was 125,000 men in the British Isles, with 75,000 in India and Burma and a further 33,000 in other overseas postings. The Army Reserve came to 145,000 men, with 64,000 in the Militia (or Special Reserve) and 272,000 in the Territorial Force.

=== Home service ===
The peacetime regular establishment in the British Isles was eighty-one battalions of infantry — in theory, one battalion of each line regiment was deployed on home service and one on overseas service at any given point, rotating the battalions every few years — and nineteen regiments of cavalry.

Aside from those earmarked for the Expeditionary Force, there were three battalions of Guards and eight of line infantry (including those in the Channel Islands) – roughly a division's worth. In the event, six battalions of these regulars were deployed to the Continent along with the Expeditionary Force, to act as army troops. The Border Regiment and Alexandra, Princess of Wales's Own (Yorkshire Regiment) had the unusual distinction of being the only two regular infantry regiments not to contribute troops to the Expeditionary Force; both would first see action with 7th Division, which landed in October.

Given the rioting that had occurred during the national strikes 1911–12, there was concern that there would be unrest in London at the outbreak of war. Consequently, three cavalry regiments — the 1st Life Guards, 2nd Life Guards, and Royal Horse Guards – were stationed in the London District and not earmarked for the Expeditionary Force; these each provided a squadron for a composite regiment, which served with the 4th Cavalry Brigade. In addition, there were three Royal Field Artillery brigades, and a number of Royal Horse Artillery batteries, not earmarked for overseas service.

After the Expeditionary Force had departed, this left a total regular establishment of three cavalry regiments (somewhat depleted) and five infantry battalions – less than a tenth of the normal combat strength of the home forces, and mostly deployed around London. This defensive force would be supplemented by the units of the Territorial Force, which were called up on the outbreak of war — indeed, many were already embodied for their summer training when mobilisation was ordered — and by the Special Reserve.

The Territorial Force was planned with a mobilisation strength of fourteen divisions, each structured along the lines of a regular division with twelve infantry battalions, four artillery brigades, two engineer companies, &c. – and fourteen brigades of Yeomanry cavalry. It was envisaged that these units would be used solely for home defence, though in the event almost all volunteered for overseas service; the first battalions arrived on the Continent in November.

=== Overseas service ===
Forty-eight battalions of infantry were serving in India – the equivalent of four regular divisions — with five in Malta, four in South Africa, four in Egypt, and a dozen in various other Imperial outposts. A further nine regular cavalry regiments were serving in India, with two in South Africa and one in Egypt.

The forces in the rest of the British Empire were not expected to contribute to the Expeditionary Force. A sizeable proportion of these were part of the ten-division Army of India, a mixture of local forces and British regulars; planning had begun in August 1913 to arrange how the Indian forces could be used in a European war, and a tentative plan had been made for two infantry divisions and a cavalry brigade to be added to the Expeditionary Force; these were dispatched, in the event, but did not arrive in France until October.

In the event, most of the overseas garrison units were withdrawn as soon as they could be replaced with Territorial battalions, and new regular divisions were formed piecemeal in the United Kingdom. None of these units arrived in time to see service with the Expeditionary Force.

== See also ==
- British infantry brigades of the First World War
