= 8th County of London Brigade, Royal Field Artillery =

8th County of London Brigade, RFA 65th (8th London) Field Regiment, RA 265 (8th London) Heavy Anti-Aircraft Regiment, RA London and Kent Regiment, RA 265 (Home Counties) Air Assault Battery, RA
- Royal Artillery cap badge (pre-1953)
- Active: 1 May 1908 – present
- Country: United Kingdom
- Branch: Territorial Force
- Type: Artillery Brigade/Regiment
- Role: Field Artillery
- Part of: 47th (1/2nd London) Division; 60th (2/2nd London) Division; 44th (Home Counties) Division; 56th (London) Division; 18th Division
- Garrison/HQ: Plumstead; Lee Green; Grove Park
- Engagements: First World War: Battle of Aubers Ridge; Battle of Festubert; Battle of Loos; Battle of the Somme; Salonika; Palestine; Capture of Jerusalem; Second World War: Battle of France; Fall of Singapore; Second Battle of El Alamein; Tunisian Campaign; Operation Avalanche; Crossing of the Garigliano; Battle of Anzio; Operation Olive; Operation Grapeshot

The 8th London (Howitzer) Brigade, Royal Field Artillery was a new unit formed when Britain's Territorial Force was created in 1908. Its origin lay in Artillery Volunteer Corps formed in the 1860s in Plumstead, Kent, later incorporated into London. Together with its wartime duplicate the brigade served during the First World War on the Western Front, at Salonika and in Palestine where it was the first British unit to enter Jerusalem. It again formed two units for service in the Second World War, one of which saw extensive action in France, North Africa, and Italy, while its duplicate was captured at the Fall of Singapore. Its successor unit continues in the Army Reserve today.

== Origin ==
When the Volunteer Force was subsumed into the new Territorial Force (TF) on 1 May 1908 under the Haldane Reforms, the 2nd Kent Royal Garrison Artillery (Volunteers) split to form two brigades in the Royal Field Artillery: the headquarters and four companies at Lewisham provided the IV County of London (Howitzer) Brigade while the four companies at Plumstead formed the VIII County of London (Howitzer) Brigade from 7 July 1908 with the following organisation: (Note: Both Lewisham and Plumstead had been transferred from Kent to the new County of London in 1883. Plumstead was in the Metropolitan Borough of Woolwich.)

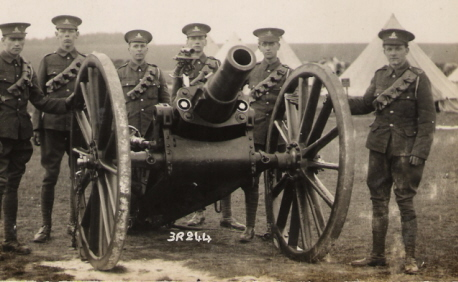
BL 5-inch howitzer and TF gunners in camp before the First World War

VIII County of London (Howitzer) Brigade, RFA

- 21st County of London (Howitzer) Battery
- 22nd County of London (Howitzer) Battery
- VIII London (Howitzer) Brigade Ammunition Column (added 26 May 1909)

The new headquarters (HQ) was established at 'Oaklands', St Margaret's Road (later St Margaret's Grove), Plumstead, soon after the units split. VIII Brigade also had a presence at the old 2nd Kent RGA drill hall at Bloomfield Road, Greenwich. The first commanding officer (CO) was Major P.O. Thomas of the 2nd Kent, who was promoted to lieutenant-colonel.

Armed with four horsedrawn Breech-loading 5-inch howitzers each, (Note: However, VIII London (H) Brigade was photographed training with wooden guns and mule teams in 1909.) the batteries of IV and VIII Brigades were intended to provide indirect fire support for the TF's 1st London and 2nd London Divisions respectively. (Note: 2nd London Division's historian claimed that some of the howitzers had seen action of the Battle of Omdurman in 1898.)

== First World War ==
=== Mobilisation ===
On the outbreak of war the brigade was commanded by a Regular officer, Maj W.E. Emery, who was a Temporary Lt-Col in the TF. When war was declared in August 1914, VIII London Bde had only just arrived at Perham Down on Salisbury Plain for its annual training camp, and it was immediately recalled to London to mobilise. After completing their mobilisation the 2nd London Division's artillery brigades moved to the country round Hemel Hempstead, Berkhamsted and Kings Langley in Hertfordshire to begin war training.

After mobilisation TF units were invited to volunteer for Overseas Service. On 15 August 1914, the War Office issued instructions to separate those men who had signed up for Home Service only, and form these into reserve units. On 31 August, the formation of a reserve or 2nd Line unit was authorised for each 1st Line unit where 60 per cent or more of the men had volunteered for Overseas Service. The titles of these 2nd Line units would be the same as the original, but distinguished by a '2/' prefix. In this way duplicate batteries, brigades and divisions were created, mirroring those TF formations being sent overseas. Eventually these too were prepared for overseas service and 3rd Line reserve units were formed to produce reinforcement drafts to the others. The duplicate 2/VIII London Brigade was formed at Plumstead in October 1914.

=== I/VIII London Brigade ===
At the end of October 1914 the 2nd London Division was chosen to reinforce the British Expeditionary Force (BEF) fighting on the Western Front and training was stepped up, despite bad weather and equipment shortages. Brigade and divisional training began in February 1915 and it received its orders for the move to France on 2 March. By 22 March all the batteries had reached the divisional concentration area around Béthune.

==== Aubers Ridge ====
While the division's infantry were introduced to trench routine by being attached in groups to the 1st and 2nd Divisions holding the line, the TF field batteries with their obsolescent guns were interspersed with those of the two Regular divisions equipped with modern 18-pounder guns and 4.5-inch howitzers. However, ammunition was very scarce, and they were restricted to three rounds per gun per day during April. Ammunition was being saved for the Battle of Aubers Ridge on 9 May, when the 5-inch howitzers of 1/VIII London Bde joined with those of IV West Riding Bde, the 4.5s of XLIV Bde and the heavy howitzers of the Royal Garrison Artillery (RGA) to break down the German breastworks for the assault by 1st Division. The bombardment became intense at 5:30, then at 5:40 the guns lifted to targets 600 yards (550 m) further back and the infantry moved to the attack. The attackers ran into devastating machine gun fire (there was no artillery barrage to suppress the defenders) and they found that the barbed wire was inadequately cut and the breastworks barely touched. The inexperienced artillery had failed in all its tasks. A renewed bombardment was ordered from 6:15 to 7:00, but the artillery's forward observation officers (FOOs) were unable to locate the hidden German machine gun positions, which required a direct hit from an HE shell to be put out of action. The second attack failed as badly as the first, as did two others launched during the afternoon, and the survivors were pinned down in No man's land until nightfall, despite a further bombardment being laid on to allow them to withdraw.

==== Festubert ====
Although 2nd London Division suffered few casualties at Aubers Ridge, its gunners had learned a sobering lesson about the impossibility of suppressing strong defences with inadequate guns and shells. On 11 May the division was redesignated 47th (1/2nd London) Division, and on the night of 14/15 May it took its place in the line for the Battle of Festubert. The guns were already in place, with 47th Divisional Artillery operating under the control of 7th Division. Despite the continuing shortage of ammunition, the plan this time was for a long methodical bombardment. On 13 and 14 May the field artillery carried out three two-hour deliberate bombardments each day, with the howitzers registering the enemy support and communication trenches with observed fire, and then firing to destroy them, along with certain important salients in the front line. Intermittent bombardments were continued during the night to stop supplies being brought up and to prevent repairs being carried out. The guns fired about 100 rounds per day. Unfortunately, the FOOs reported that many of the howitzer shells failed to explode due to faulty manufacture of the fuzes. During 15 May feint bombardments mimicking the moment of assault were carried out, but the actual attack was made after dark with some success. The fighting went on for several days, and between 18 and 20 May the Canadian and 51st (Highland) Divisions took over the line under the command of Lt-Gen Edwin Alderson as 'Alderson's Force', with 1/VIII London Bde among its supporting artillery. 47th (2nd L) Division made its own first attack on the night of 25 May. The leading brigade captured the German front and support trenches, but was then pinned down by accurate German artillery fire and could advance no further. This effectively ended the battle.

==== Loos ====
In June 47th (2nd L) Division took over trenches in front of Loos-en-Gohelle from the French. In August the divisional artillery was rested for the first time since March, and the brigade began training on the 4.5-inch howitzer for when these became available. The Loos sector had been selected for the next major British attack (the Battle of Loos), to which part of 47th (2nd L) Division would provide the southern 'hinge'. The batteries moved into position in the weeks beforehand, Maj E.H. Eley of 1/22nd London Bty finding a concealed position in a railway cutting. He placed each 5-inch howitzer between some abandoned railway trucks and covered them with tarpaulins so they could not be seen from the air. German maps captured in the subsequent fighting showed that this was one of only two British battery positions that had not been identified. 1/VIII London Bde, with the eight remaining 5-inch howitzers on the front, were allotted 4800 HE rounds for the coming battle. 1/21st London Bty was attached to XL Bde as part of the 'MacNaghten Group' supporting the attack by 140th (4th London) and 141st (5th London) infantry brigades, while the rest of the division stood firm while firing continuously on the German trenches opposite. Supported by poison gas clouds, the attacking portion of 47th (2nd L) Division made good progress towards its limited objective on the first day (25 September). However, events had not played out so well further north at the Hohenzollern Redoubt, and the battle raged on after 47th (2nd L) Division had been relieved between 28 September and 1 October. On 13 October 47th (2nd L) Division was in support for the final attack on the Hohenzollern Redoubt, and was practising on dummy trenches for a follow-up attack on Hulluch next day, but the results at the Hohenzollern were so disappointing that the operation was cancelled. The division took over the line and the artillery was in constant action over the following weeks.

The division returned to the Loos sector in January 1916, with most of the artillery round Grenay, with Observation Posts (OPs) in the cottages of Maroc, which had become known as 'Artillery Row' during the earlier battle. The guns carried out a great deal of counter-battery (CB) work against battery positions in and around Lens, ammunition supply having improved.

==== Spring 1916 ====
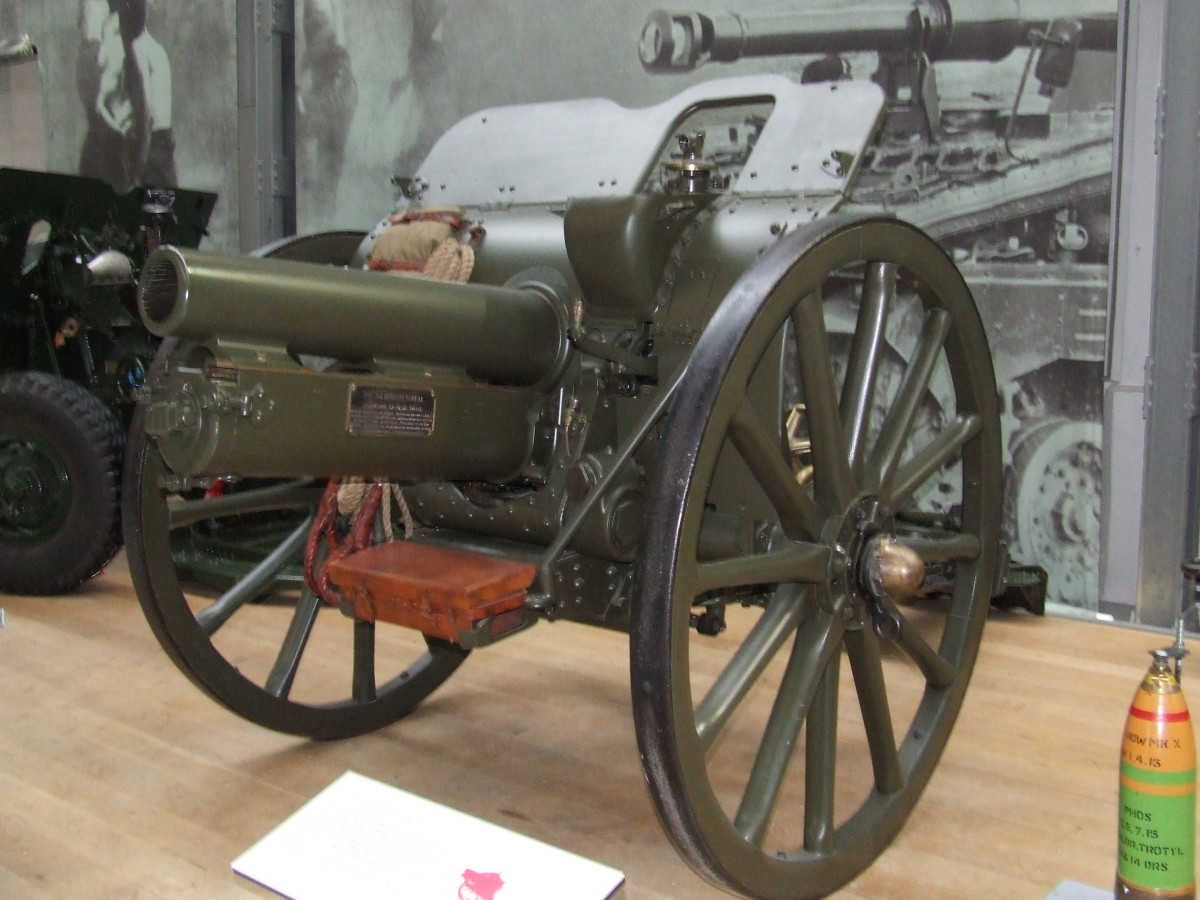
4.5-inch howitzer at the Royal Artillery Museum

On 19 January 1916 the batteries of 1/VIII London Bde were re-equipped with modern 4.5-inch howitzers, for which they had been training since August. On 4 February it was joined by B (H) Bty and a subsection of the Brigade Ammunition Column (BAC) from CLXXVI (Leicestershire) Howitzer Bde, a newly arrived 'Kitchener's Army' unit, followed by R (H) Bty of CLXXVI Bde on 4 April. (Note: Army Council Instruction 856 of 20 April 1916 implies that R (H) Bty was B (H) Bty of CLXXVI Bde redesignated, but Becke regards it as separate, giving the brigade the four batteries it is known to have had.)

The field artillery of the BEF was reorganised in May 1916, with the brigades being numbered and the batteries lettered. 1/VIII London Bde became CCXXXVIII Brigade (238 Bde) on 14 May, exchanging R (H) Bty for the Regular 34th Bty from CCXXXV Bde (formerly V London Bde), and transferring 1/22nd London Bty to CCXXXVI (formerly VI London) Bde in exchange for R Bty from CCXXXVII (formerly VII London) Bde. The BAC was also absorbed into the Divisional Ammunition Column. This gave the brigade the following organisation:

- 34th Bty (originally with XXXVIII Bde in 6th Division)– 4 × 18-pdr
- B Bty (formerly B/CLXXVI Bde in 34th Division) – 4 × 18-pdr
- C Bty (formerly R/VII London Bty) – 4 × 18-pdr
- D (H) Bty (formerly 1/21st London Bty) – 4 × 4.5-inch

By now the brigade was commanded by Lt-Col E.H. Eley, who had commanded 22nd London Bty from its formation in 1908.

In the spring of 1916, 47th (2nd L) Division took over the lines facing Vimy Ridge. Active mine warfare was being conducted by both sides underground. In May the Germans secretly assembled 80 batteries in the sector and on 21 May carried out a heavy bombardment in the morning; the bombardment resumed at 15:00 and an assault was launched at 15.45, while the guns lifted onto the British guns and fired a Box barrage into Zouave Valley to seal the attacked sector off from support. 47th Divisional Artillery reported 150 heavy shells an hour landing on its poorly-covered battery positions and guns being put out of action, while its own guns tried to respond to SOS calls from the infantry under attack, though most communications were cut by the box barrage. During the night the gun pits were shelled with gas, but on 22 May the artillery duel began to swing towards the British, with fresh batteries brought in, despite their shortage of ammunition. A system of 'one round strikes' was introduced: whenever a German battery was identified every gun in range fired one round at it, which effectively suppressed them. British counter-attacks were attempted, but when the fighting died down the Germans had succeeded in capturing the British front line. Throughout their stay in the Vimy sector the batteries suffered heavily from German CB fire.

==== Somme ====
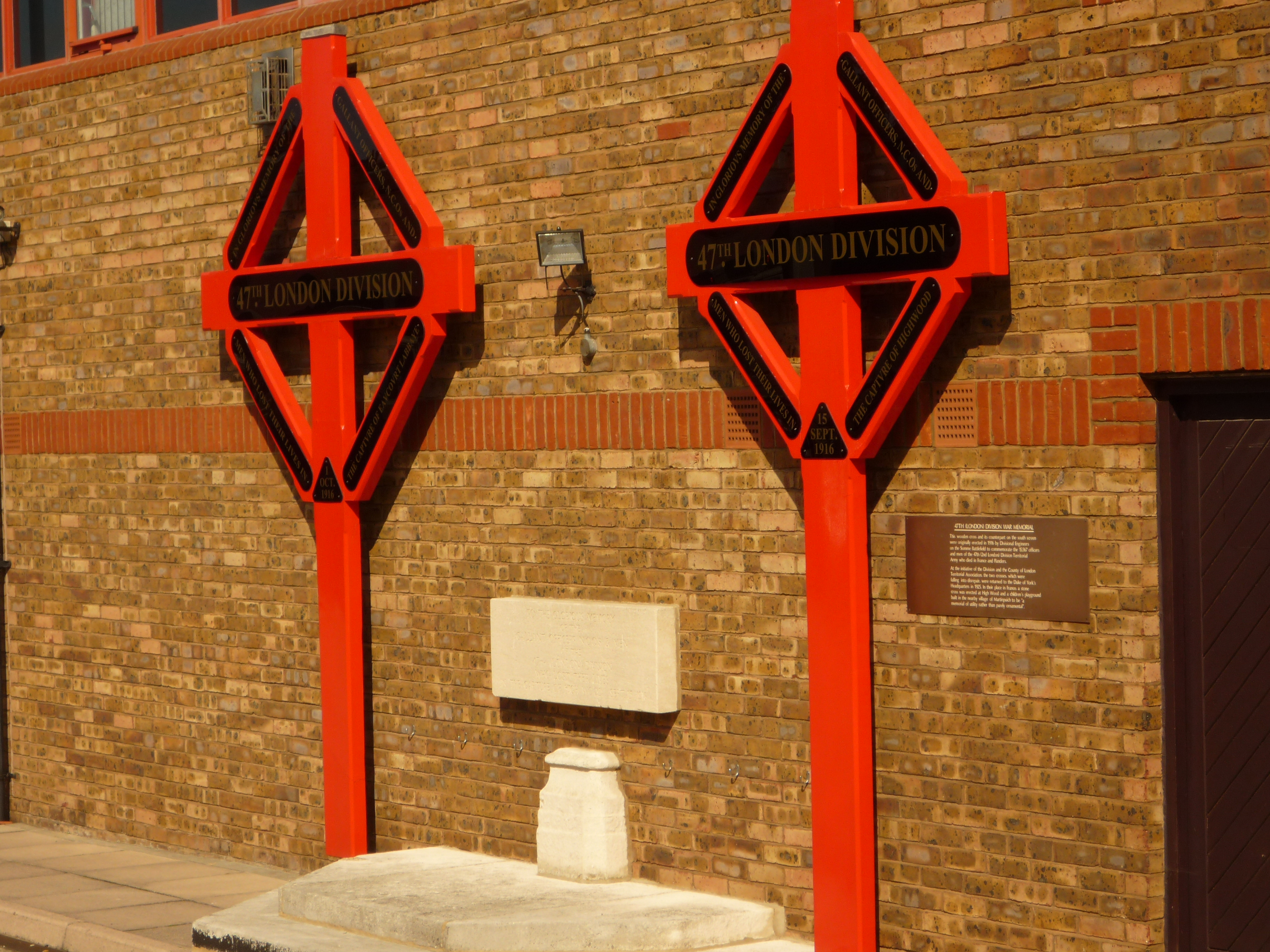
The two wooden memorial crosses originally erected at High Wood and Eaucourt l'Abbaye by 47th (2nd London) Division in 1916, now at Connaught House in Camberwell

On 1 August 1916 47th (2nd L) Division began to move south to join in the Somme Offensive. While the infantry underwent training with the newly introduced tanks, the divisional artillery went into the line on 14 August in support of 15th (Scottish) Division. The batteries were positioned in Bottom Wood and near Mametz Wood, and became familiar with the ground over which 47th (2nd L) Division was later to attack, while supporting 15th (S) Division's gradual encroachment on Martinpuich. Casualties among FOOs and signallers was heavy in this kind of fighting. Between 9 and 11 September 47th (2nd L) Division took over the front in the High Wood sector, and on 15 September the Battle of Flers-Courcelette was launched, with tank support for the first time. The barrage fired by the divisional artillery left lanes through which the tanks could advance. However, the tanks proved useless in the tangled tree stumps of High Wood, and the artillery could not bombard the German front line because No man's land was so narrow. Casualties among the attacking infantry were extremely heavy, but they succeeded in capturing High Wood and the gun batteries began to move up in support, crossing deeply-cratered ground. Casualties among the exposed guns and gunners took their toll, but a German counter-attack was broken up by gunfire. Next day the division fought to consolidate its positions round the captured 'Cough Drop' strongpoint. When the infantry were relieved on 19 September the artillery remained in the line under 1st Division.

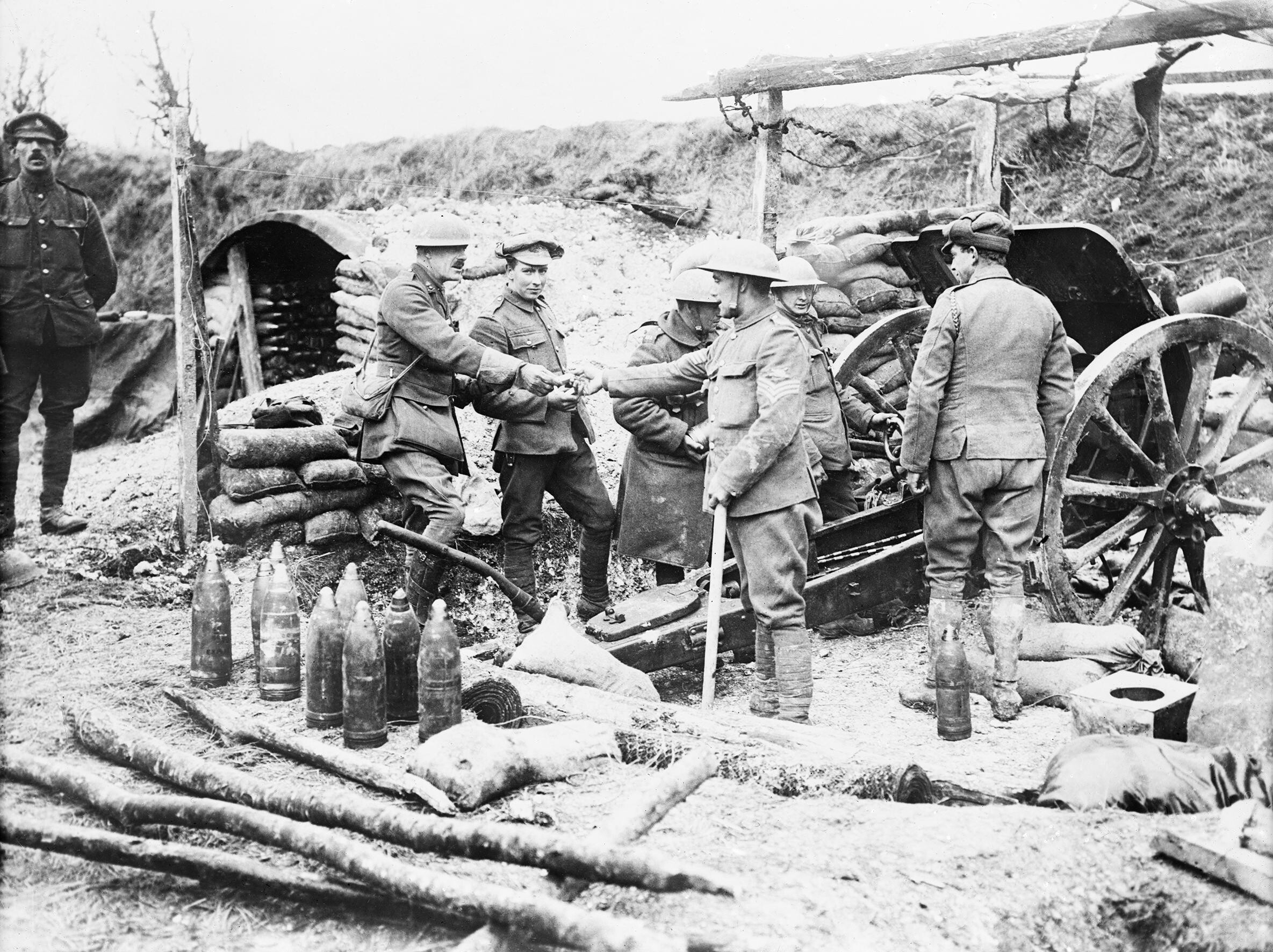
A 4.5-inch howitzer emplacement on the Somme, September 1916

47th (2nd L) Division came back into the line to relieve 1st Division on 28/29 September, and began attacking Eaucourt L'Abbaye as part of the Battle of the Transloy Ridges, finally securing the ruins on 3 October. This allowed the batteries to cross the High Wood Ridge into a small valley where they remained for the rest of the Somme fighting, helping to cover the unsuccessful attacks by 47th (2nd L) Division and later 9th (Scottish) Division against the Butte de Warlencourt through October. By now the gun lines were crowded together in deep mud, guns sank up to their axles, and getting ammunition through was extremely difficult. The artillery was finally relieved on 14 October and followed the rest of the division to the Ypres Salient.

At Ypres 47th (2nd L) Division garrisoned the Hill 60 sector, where intensive mine and trench warfare had been conducted for two years. The divisional artillery was arranged in two groups, one in Ypres, the other in the Railway Dugouts. These battery positions were under enemy observation and were frequently shelled during the winter. On 16 January 1917 a German attack was anticipated, and the divisional artillery, together with that of 23rd and 41st Divisions and the Corps and Army heavy guns, carried out an intense bombardment, which brought considerable enemy retaliation. As well as organised bombardments of the enemy lines, the guns frequently responded to SOS calls from the front during enemy raids, and laid on wire-cutting and box barrages for British trench raids.

A further reorganisation of the BEF's field artillery was carried out during the winter of 1916–17. On 27 November B Bty was split up between 34th and C Btys to bring both up to six guns; C Bty became the new B Bty. At the same time C and half of B Bty from CCXXXVII (VII London) Bde replaced C Bty. However, CCXXXVIII Brigade's headquarters was abolished on 21 January 1917, and the brigade ceased to exist for the rest of the war. The batteries were dispersed: 34th to CLXXXIX (Hackney) Army Field Bde, B to CIV Army Field Bde, C to CCXXXVI (VI London) Bde and D (H) to CCXXXV (V London) Bde.

=== 2/VIII London Brigade ===
The 2/2nd London Division came into existence quickly as volunteers rushed to join up. There were no guns or horses for the artillery, but the batteries improvised dummy guns mounted on handcarts, with wooden sights and washing-lines for drag-ropes. Although the Master-General of the Ordnance, Major-General Sir Stanley von Donop, was pleased with their work and promised them the first guns available, it was not until May 1915 that some old 5-inch howitzers arrived for training. In 1915 the division took the place of 1/2nd London Division in the St Albans area, 2/VIII Bde arriving in April. At the end of May, now numbered 60th (2/2nd London) Division, the division moved into Essex, with the artillery at Much Hadham. Finally, at the end of 1915 it began to receive new 4.5-inch howitzers and towards the end of January 1916 the division moved to the Warminster training area on Salisbury Plain. On 28 April the brigade was brought up to three batteries by the arrival of 4/LX (H) Bty, a Kitchener's Army battery that had originally been raised for the 11th (Northern) Division.

The division was warned to prepare for embarkation to the Western Front. On 17–18 May the artillery brigades were converted to the establishment adopted by the BEF: 2/VIII Bde was numbered CCCIII Brigade (303 Bde), 2/21st London Bty left to become D (H) Bty in CCC (formerly 2/V London) Bde, and 2/22nd London Bty became D (H) Bty in CCCII (formerly 2/VII London) Bde. 3/1st, 3/2nd and 3/3rd Wessex Btys, which had earlier joined the other brigades in the division, became A, B and C Btys, and the former 4/LX Bty became D (H). The BACs were also abolished before the division went overseas. CCCIII Brigade therefore had no remaining London units in its organisation: (Note: It was unusual for Reserve or 3rd Line TF units to be sent on active service; the few cases appear to be where both the 1st and 2nd Lines had gone overseas very early in the war (such as the four battalions of the 3/1st London Infantry Brigade). There were no 1st or 2nd line 'Wessex' Batteries; it is possible that 3/1st–3/3rd were composite batteries formed from the 3rd Lines of the four Wessex brigades (whose batteries were designated Hampshire, Dorsetshire, Wiltshire and Devonshire), all of which had been sent to India in 1914.)

- A (formerly 3/1st Wessex) Bty – 4 × 18-pdrs
- B (formerly 3/2nd Wessex) Bty – 4 × 18-pdrs
- C (formerly 3/3rd Wessex) Bty – 4 × 18-pdrs
- D (H) (formerly 4/LX) Bty – 4 × 4.5-inch

==== Western Front ====
On 14 June 1916 orders arrived for 60th (2/2nd L) Division to embark, and the artillery units made the crossing from Southampton to Le Havre between 22 and 26 June, with CCCIII Bde under the command of Lt-Col N. Bayley. The division concentrated in the area behind Arras by 29 June. It relieved 51st (Highland) Division in the line on 14 July, with the artillery moving into position over the next three nights. The line held was facing the same strong German positions along Vimy Ridge that 47th (2nd L) Division had faced, and there was constant mine warfare and trench raiding. The artillery was mostly engaged in suppressing troublesome German trench mortars (Minenwerfers) by firing short concentrated bombardments on specific sectors of the enemy line. Some trench raids were preceded by local wire-cutting bombardments, or by a barrage, others were 'stealth' raids.

On 30–31 August the divisional artillery underwent the same reorganisation into six-gun batteries that was going on throughout the BEF. In CCCIII Bde this meant half batteries joining from CCC Bde, which was being broken up. However, orders arrived on 1 November for the division to transfer to the Macedonian front (Salonika), where the four-gun establishment was still in force, and the batteries reverted to their original organisation; the former sections from CCC Bde left and formed a composite B/CCC Bty, which remained in France as an instructional battery at First Army School. The BAC was also reformed. Once the brigade was in Macedonia, the six-gun battery establishment was introduced there as well, and this time C Bty was broken up to bring A and B Btys up to six guns each (D (H) Hty became C (H) on 20 June 1917).

==== Salonika ====
Entrainment of the artillery for the embarkation port of Marseille began on 14 November and was a slow business due to lack of facilities: the drivers needed their wooden trench bridges to get their horses aboard the trains. All units were embarked and at sea by 12 December and proceeded to Salonika via Malta. Early in 1917 the division's units moved up the poor roads to the Lake Doiran sector and settled in to improve the defences and harass the enemy. Veterinary officers found that the transport horses and mules in this campaign were overworked, but that artillery horses lacked exercise and it became standard practice to allow them to wander at will during the day and then round them up a feeding times. In early March the division began moving in bad weather to take over the line between Lake Doiran and the Vardar in preparation for the Allied Spring offensive. Apart from diversionary raids, 60th (2/2nd L) Division took little part in the first part of this operation (8–9 April), most of its batteries being used to reinforce the main attack near Lake Doiran, which required several days' artillery preparation. The division did attack during the second phase of the offensive (8/9 May), but it captured its objectives by night attacks without preliminary artillery fire. A further advance was made by the division on 15 May, but the rest of the offensive having come to a standstill it was called off on 24 May. On 1 June 1917 the division was marched back to Salonika to embark for Egypt.

==== Palestine ====
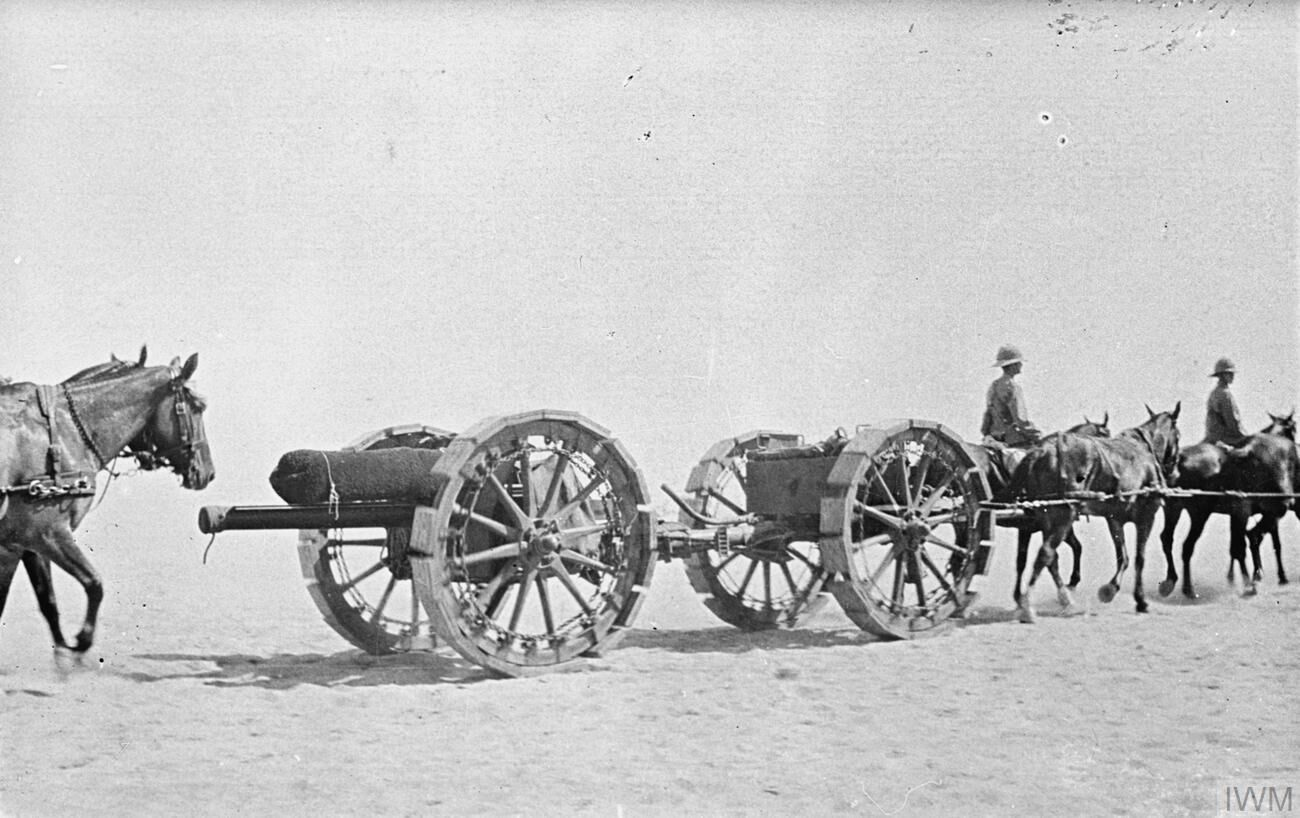
18-pounder with sand wheels in the Suez Canal area

After landing at Alexandria between 18 and 22 June, 60th (2/2nd L) Division moved to the Suez Canal to join the Egyptian Expeditionary Force (EEF), where its units were reorganised (the BACs were absorbed into the DAC once more) and underwent training before crossing Sinai in early July 1917. Further intensive training followed until late October, when the division made its first full-scale attack of the war, at Beersheba. In the weeks leading up to the attack artillery officers had regularly ridden close to the Beersheba defences to reconnoitre, often under fire. Concentration for the attack was carried out under cover of darkness, beginning on 20/21 October and completed on 28/29 October. The divisional artillery was divided into Right and Left groups corresponding to the two attacking brigade; CCCIII Bde was part of Right Group supporting 179th (2/4th London) Brigade. The whole force moved forward under moonlight on 30/31 October, with the Royal Engineers improving the track north of Wadi ed Sabe for the artillery, which was in position by 1:30. At dawn the guns began to bombard Hill 1070, pausing at 7:00 to let the smoke and dust clear. Right Group then resumed its wirecutting and at 8:30 the guns switched to intensive bombardment, 179th Bde moving forward as the guns lifted. By 13:00 the whole of the defence works were in British hands, and that evening the Desert Mounted Corps entered Beersheba.

The next phase of the offensive involved 60th (2/2nd L) Division in an attack on Kauwukah in the Turkish Sheria position (the Battle of Hareira and Sheria) on 6 November. The attacking brigades moved forwards at 3:30 with the artillery, which began wire-cutting as soon as it was in position. Each 18-pdr battery cut two 10 yards (9.1 m) gaps in the wire by 12:15, and then began a bombardment of the enemy trench as the attack went in against heavy fire. The field guns then lifted onto the works in the second line. The whole defensive position was in the division's hands by 14:00 and it pushed patrols ahead towards Sheria and its water supply. Each brigade advanced with its artillery group, 'Bayley's Group' (commanded by CCCIII Bde's CO) supported 181st (2/6th London) Brigade. Sheria was captured at daybreak the following morning without artillery preparation, CCCIII Bde's guns moving up under heavy shellfire to support the attack once launched. B Bty advanced one gun under Lieutenant E.C. Philpott and stopped the fire of machine guns that were holding up 180th (2/5th London) Brigade. Two Turkish counter-attacks were broken up by the field guns. CCCIII Brigade suffered casualties of two officers wounded, 23 men killed, 26 wounded, and 39 horses and mules killed or wounded. The infantry brigade groups continued their advance the following day, supported by their artillery groups (Bayley's Group supporting 179th Bde in the advance guard). By 9:30, 179th Bde had cleared the Zuheilikah ridge and supported by the artillery stormed the strongly held village of Muntaret-el-Baghl. The brigade then reorganised to advance on its final objective, Huj, which was undefended after a mounted charge by the Worcestershire and Warwickshire Yeomanry.

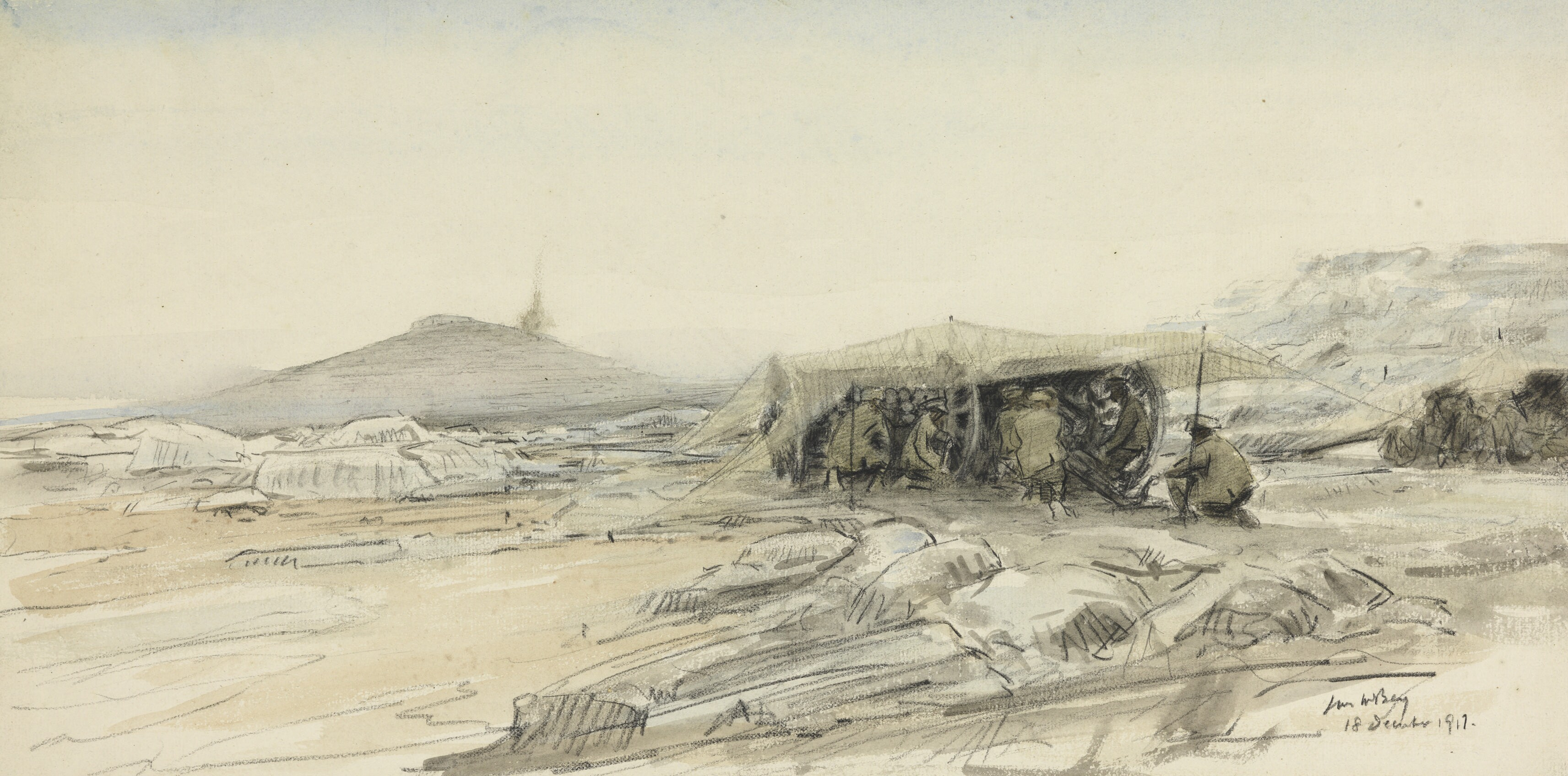
Drawing by James McBey of an RFA battery engaging Turkish batteries at Nebi Samwil

After a short rest at Huj, the division bivouacked at Gaza under heavy rain, then began a 42 miles (68 km) march through the mud to Junction Station, which it reached on 22 November. It now entered the last stage of the Battle of Nebi Samwil, where the objectives were a tangle of hill slopes, with tracks so bad that it was impossible to bring up the guns until roads had been made for them. Nebi Samwil had been captured by units of 75th Division, and the London battalions that relieved them came under fierce counter-attacks on 29 November; only the supporting British artillery fire allowed them to maintain their position. However, the way was now open to attack the final defences of Jerusalem; an encirclement was chosen, to avoid attacking the city itself. The surprise attack began on 8 December without artillery support; once progress had been made the batteries were to move up and come under command of the brigade groups. The going was tough for the gun teams, and while the infantry fought their way into the suburbs of Jerusalem; there was little the artillery could do to support them. The Turks evacuated the city and the following morning the mayor and civic leaders initially surrendered the city to two sergeants of 2/19th Londons. They were followed an hour later by Maj W.C. Beck of C/CCCIII Bty and Maj F.R. Barry of 413 (H) Bty of CCCII Bde on reconnaissance, who said that they were not authorised to accept the surrender, but passed the information to 60th Divisional Artillery HQ. The first formed party to enter the city was a small force of gunners commanded by Lt-Col Bayley, who had been bringing CCCIII Bde up the road from Qalonye.

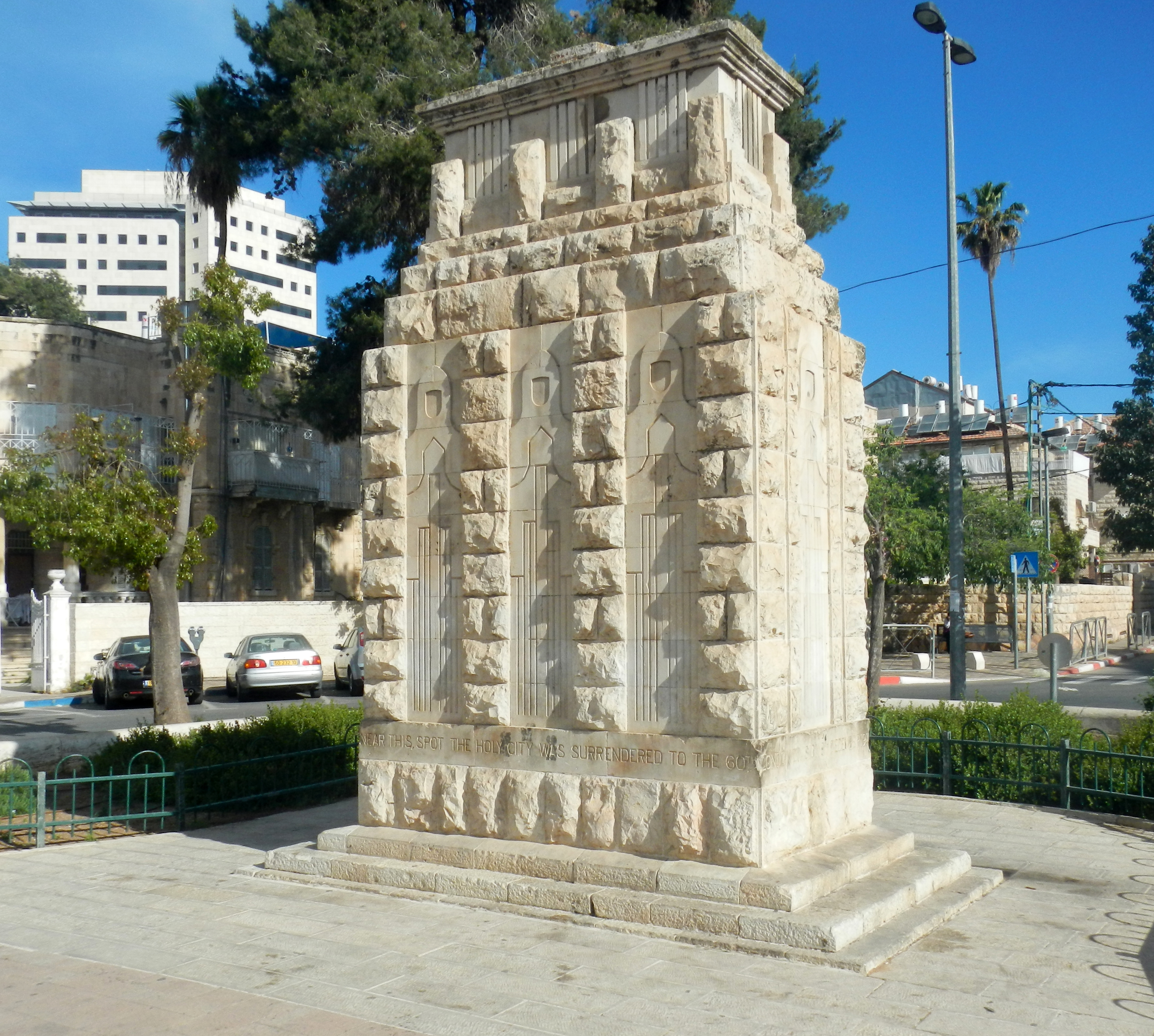
Monument to the surrender of Jerusalem to 60th (2/2nd London) Division

60th (2/2nd L) Division was then pushed forward into positions from which to defend the captured city. Turkish counter-attacks began on 22 December, and a major attack followed on the night of 26/27 December. This was beaten off and the division took the opportunity to push forward up the Nablus Road into the hills over the following days. 60th Divisional Artillery made 'extraordinary exertions' to get its guns up to support attacks that captured the heights of Tahuneh and Shab Salah on 29 December. 180th Brigade was halted by enemy fire until CCCIII Bde struggled through to come into action and allow 181st Bde to resume the advance. The Jerusalem defences were then garrisoned by 179th Bde backed by CCCIII Bde.

There was a pause in operations until February 1918 when the EEF moved to drive the Turks east of the Jordan. 60th (2/2nd L) Division advanced with three brigade groups, each supported by artillery, and worked its way forward between 14 and 21 February over rough country, with Turkish road demolitions needing repair before the guns could get forward. Major Cooke, in temporary command of CCCIII Bde supporting 180th Bde Group, reported that 'On the way to support the 2/20th [Londons], finding the bridge blown up, we unhooked the teams, and with the help of sixty men of the 2/20th, dragged the guns bodily down into the wadi and up the other side, in time to render much needed aid to the Infantry held up south of Talat-ed-Dumm'. On 21 February the Australian 1st Light Horse Brigade swept into Jericho, leaving the Turks with only small bridgeheads west of the Jordan.

60th (2/2nd L) Division then crossed the river on the night of 21 March to carry out the First Transjordan raid. A Pontoon bridge was built at Ghoraniyeh, and during the night 24/5 March CCCIII Bde went over to support the infantry advance. The reinforced division advanced as far as Amman, though the field artillery could not get forward in the wet conditions, even with double teams of horses. Without artillery support the division failed to capture the Amman Citadel, and with its communications back to the Jordan threatened, the raiding force withdrew on 30–31 March. The EEF then settled down to defend its Jordan bridgeheads. CCCIII Brigade played no part in the Second Transjordan raid in May, after which 60th (2/2nd L) Division then went into Corps Reserve for a rest.

As a result of the German spring offensive and consequent British manpower crisis on the Western Front, 60th (2/2nd L) Division was changed between 25 May and 1 August to an Indian Army establishment, releasing three-quarters of its London infantry units for service in France and replacing them with Indian units; however, this did not affect the artillery, which continued to serve with the division in Palestine.

In July the Abu Tulul salient in the Jordan Valley was garrisoned by the 1st Light Horse Brigade when it was attacked by German troops bolstering the Turks. Among the artillery supporting this sector was C (H)/CCCIII Bty. When the Australian unit in the front line heard the sound of movement in front at 1:00 on 14 July he called down a defensive barrage in front of his position; the enemy artillery also came into action, shelling the whole position. A serious attack came in at 3:30 as the Australians withdrew their outposts, but after a fierce fight the Light Horse recovered their positions and took hundreds of prisoners.

For the final offensive in Palestine, the Battle of Megiddo, 60th Division was transferred to the coastal sector where the breakthrough was to be made. The opening attack (the Battle of Sharon) went in at 4:30 on 19 September behind an intense artillery bombardment. As soon as the barrage programme was complete, the artillery moved up behind the infantry, who had gained their first objectives. The division then continued its advance as the Turks streamed away in retreat. The 60th Division advanced for the next three days against enemy rearguards until it ran ahead of its supplies.

After the battle the pursuit was carried out by the mounted troops and 60th Division was left behind on salvage duties. It was still in the rear areas when the Armistice of Mudros ended the war with Turkey on 31 October. The division then went back to Alexandria where demobilisation began and units were gradually reduced to cadres, though still with some responsibility for internal security and seizing illegal arms. The division ceased to exist on 31 May 1919 and CCCIII Bde was disbanded.

=== 2/2nd London Battery ===
After leaving CCCIII Bde, 2/22nd London Bty became D (H)/CCCII Bty and continued to serve in 60th (2/2nd L) Division in Macedonia. On arrival in Egypt, the battery transferred to become C (H) in CCLXVIII Bde on 19 June 1917. This brigade was newly formed for service with 74th (Yeomanry) Division. (Note: The previous CCLXVIII Bde had been the IV Welsh Bde, but this had been renumbered CCLXVI in 1916.)

It served with this brigade at Beersheba (where the battery's howitzers were dragged into action by the pack-mules of 5th Bn Royal Irish Fusiliers), Sheria, the defence of Jerusalem, and the Battle of Tell 'Asur. On 3 April 1918, 74th (Y) Division was warned that it was to go to France as part of the same reinforcement for the BEF that saw most of 60th (2/2nd L) Division's infantry leave Palestine. Between 13 and 21 April CCLXVIII Bde was broken up, and C (H) Bty transferred within the division to XLIV Bde as D (H) Bty.

The battery embarked at Alexandria on 3 May and concentrated with 74th (Y) Division in the Abbeville district for training, principally in defence against gas. At the end of the month the division went into GHQ reserve while continuing its training. It took its place in the line on 14 July, and the participated in the Allied Hundred Days Offensive, including the battles of Bapaume and Épehy, and the final advance into Flanders.

== Interwar ==
The TF was reconstituted on 7 February 1920 and the unit reformed at Plumstead as 8th London (Howitzer) Bde, though now with four batteries numbered 21st–24th. Colonel E.H. Eley was still in command; in 1924 he became the brigade's Honorary Colonel. When the TF was reorganised as the Territorial Army (TA) in 1921, the brigade was redesignated 65th (London) Brigade, regaining its '8th London' title the following year to become:

65th (8th London) Brigade, RFA

- 257 (21st London) Bty at St Margaret's Road, Plumstead
- 258 (22nd London) Bty at St Margaret's Road, Plumstead
- 259 (23rd London) Bty at Southend Row, Eltham
- 260 (24th London) Bty (Howitzer) at St Margaret's Road, Plumstead

When the RFA was subsumed into the Royal Artillery (RA) on 1 June 1924, its units were redesignated as 'Field Brigades' and 'Field Batteries', RA. In the reformed TA, 65th (8th London) Field Bde was again part of 47th (2nd London) Division.

In 1926 the unit became the first TA field artillery brigade to be mechanised, replacing their draught horses with agricultural tractors. By 1930, 257 (21st London) Bty had moved to South Street, Greenwich, and 260 (24th London) at Plumstead had exchanged with 259 (23rd London) at Eltham. Then about December 1934, Brigade HQ, 257 and 260 Btys moved to 43/45 Eltham Road, Lee Green, leaving 258 and 259 at Plumstead.

In 1935 most of 47th (2nd London) Division was converted into 1st Anti-Aircraft Division and the remaining London units were reassigned. By the outbreak of war in 1939 65th Fd Bde had joined 44th (Home Counties) Division. When the RA adopted the term 'regiment' instead of the obsolete 'brigade' for a lieutenant-colonel's command, the unit became 65th (8th London) Field Regiment, RA, on 1 November 1938.

After the Munich Crisis the TA was rapidly doubled in size. On 15 June 1939, 65th (8th London) Field Regiment created a duplicate 118th Field Regiment, RA, at Plumstead by separating 259 (23 London) and 260 (24 London) Btys. 65th Field Rgt remained with 44th (HC) Division while 118th formed part of 12th (Eastern) Infantry Division, its second-line duplicate.

Field regiments were now organised as Regimental HQ (RHQ) and two batteries each of 12 guns. These were 18-pounders of First World War pattern, though now equipped with pneumatic tyres and towed by motorised gun tractors. There was a programme to replace the 18-pdr barrels with that of the new 25-pounder coming into service, giving the hybrid 18/25-pounder.

== Second World War ==
=== 65th (8th London) Field Regiment ===
The regiment mobilised at Lee Green under the command of Lt-Col C.C. West and on 25 September 1939 it moved to Shrapnel Barracks, Woolwich, to complete the process.. It then moved to Winterbourne Steepleton in Dorset where 44th (HC) Division concentrated on 23 October. It carried out live firing at Westdown Camp on Salisbury Plain in mid December. 44th (HC) Division embarked for France on 1 April 1940 to join the new British Expeditionary Force (BEF), and 65th Fd Rgt took up its positions at Érin and Blangy-sur-Ternoise, north-east of Hesdin.

==== Dunkirk ====
When the German offensive in the west opened on 10 May, the BEF advanced into Belgium in accordance with 'Plan D'. 44th (HC) Division moved up to the Escaut, where it was in reserve. However, the German Army broke through the Ardennes to the east, forcing the BEF to withdraw again, and by 19 May the whole force was back across the Escaut. 44th (HC) Division tried to hold the most dangerous point, but the Germans established bridgeheads across the Escaut at dawn on 20 May. The attack was renewed on 22 May and the division was badly chewed up, but there was no breakthrough: it was the deep penetration further east that forced the BEF to withdraw. Next day the BEF fell back to the 'Canal Line', and 44th (HC) Division was withdrawn into reserve.

Cut off, the BEF fell back towards the coast, with 44th (HC) Division given the responsibility of defending the area round Hazebrouck. On 26 May the decision was made to evacuate the BEF through Dunkirk (Operation Dynamo). 44th (HC) Division was heavily attacked by German Panzer divisions on 27 May, and 65th Fd Rgt at Moolmacher, with an observation post (OP) at Caëstre, spent all day engaging tanks with its field guns. Both batteries had to recover ammunition from abandoned vehicles to stay in action. By the end of the day the enemy's advanced columns had penetrated between the division's widely-spread units and it was ordered to withdraw that night. 65th Field Rgt moved to Court Croix with OPs at Rouge Croix and Strazeele, and were immediately engaged by enemy infantry. Then came orders to move to a strong position at Mont des Cats, which was held by the divisional artillery and some of the divisional Royal Engineers acting as infantry. With its flanks 'in the air' after neighbouring French formations retreated during the night of 28/29 May, the divisional commander decided to withdraw some 6 miles (9.7 km) to this position, though only Divisional HQ and scattered elements arrived by dawn to join the gunners and sappers. This rearguard was subjected to intense mortar fire next morning, then by dive-bombing, but held its position for 30 hours while the rest of the division withdrew. Battery Sergeant-Major Jack Tirrell, acting as gun position officer (GPO) of L Troop was awarded the Distinguished Conduct Medal (DCM) for gallantry on 29 May. He continued to direct a gun under heavy and accurate fire, and when all the gun detachment had been wounded he went onto the gun himself and continued to fire. Tirrell was later commissioned and went onto a distinguished career in the Western Desert Campaign with 1st Regiment Royal Horse Artillery. Covered by this rearguard, the remnants of the division reached the beaches for embarkation, reaching England on 1 June.

==== Home Defence ====
After evacuation the survivors of 65th Fd Rgt assembled at Oxford and then moved to Gloucester, then to a camp at Cheltenham Racecourse, and later arrived at Castleford in Yorkshire. Replacement guns, modern 25-pounders, began to arrive on 18 July, but there were acute shortages of gunsights and of small arms. In October 44th (HC) Division returned to invasion-threatened South East England with XII Corps.

It was only in the autumn of 1940 that the RA began producing enough battery staffs to start the process of changing regiments from a two-battery to a three-battery organisation. (Three 8-gun batteries were easier to handle, and it meant that each infantry battalion in a brigade could be closely associated with its own battery.) 65th Field Rgt formed 445 Bty on 7 January 1941 while it was stationed at Northiam, Kent.

In April 1942 the division came under War Office control preparatory to going overseas, and on 29 May it embarked for Egypt.

==== North Africa ====
44th (HC) Division arrived in Egypt on 24 July, shortly after Eighth Army had retreated to the El Alamein position. On 15 August it was assigned to XIII Corps before General Rommel attacked the El Alamein line (the Battle of Alam el Halfa). The division held the Alam Halfa ridge when the attack came in on 30 August. The Panzer attack was ragged, but a fierce battle broke out between them and 22nd Armoured Brigade, with 44th Divisional Artillery joining in 'to give the enemy tanks a hot reception'. Over the next two days the Panzers made repeated attacks but 44th (HC) Division held its position and by 3 September it was counter-attacking.

For Eighth Army's counter-offensive (the Second Battle of Alamein), 44th (HC) Division was to lead one of XIII Corps' thrusts through the enemy minefields on the first night, 23/24 October (Operation Lightfoot). A route was found through the first belt of minefields ('January') on the first night and 44th (HC) Division succeeded in passing the second minefield ('February') the next night, but the armour was unable to exploit beyond. The second phase of the offensive, Operation Supercharge, was launched on the night of 27/28 October. Eventually, the armour broke through, and next day came signs that the enemy was withdrawing. 44th (HC) Division took some part in the pursuit to El Agheila, collecting prisoners, but XIII Corps was short of transport and was left behind as Eighth Army drove westwards. Shortly afterwards 44th (HC) Division HQ was disbanded, and its units distributed.

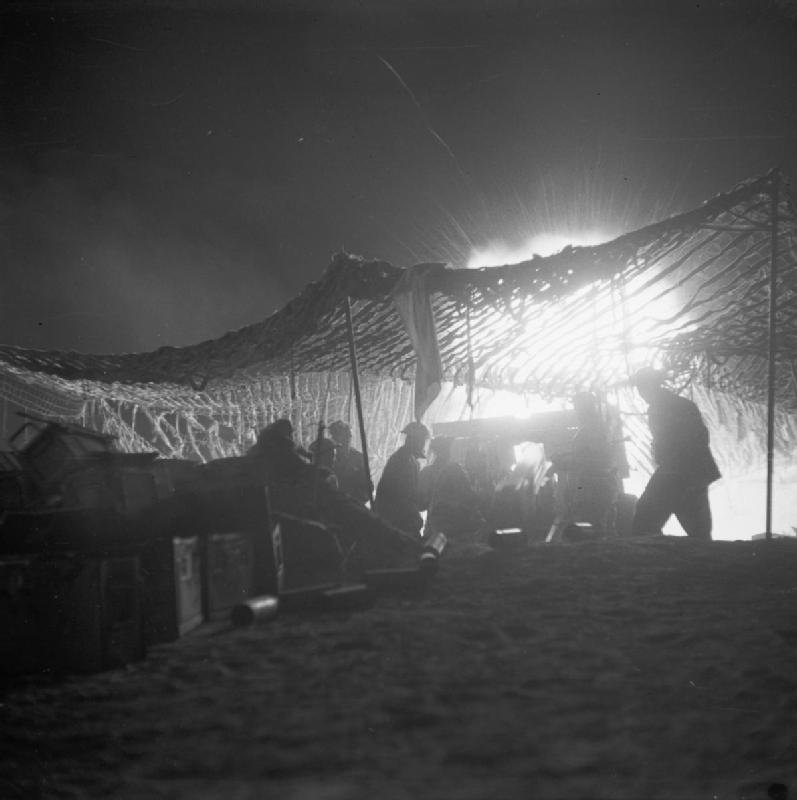
25-pounder in action during the Battle of the Mareth Line

65th (8th London) Fd Rgt was transferred to 50th (Northumbrian) Infantry Division on 19 November. This formation was in reserve, and only came back into the front line for the Battle of the Mareth Line. For this battle 50th (N) Division was tasked with assaulting the Wadi Zigzaou, which opened on the night of 16/17 March 1943 with 69th Bde successfully driving in the enemy outposts with the support of the whole divisional artillery. The following day it pushed on to the wadi itself, and began the assault with 151st Bde on 20/21 March. The divisional artillery was strongly reinforced and supplied with up to 500 rounds of ammunition per gun, but only a tiny bridgehead on the far side of the wadi was achieved by daybreak. Two more nights of heavy fighting failed to expand the bridgehead and communications with the forward troops broke down; the division was permitted to retire on 23 March as Eighth Army carried out a 'left hook' and broke through elsewhere.

The Axis forces retreated to Wadi Akarit. Again, 50th (N) Division was ordered to breach the wadi position on 5/6 April. This time the preliminary operations were 'silent', without artillery preparation; the reinforced divisional guns opened up at 4:15, firing concentrations and barrages, with 300 rounds per gun available. This time the assault went well, and by 09.35 the division's infantry were pressing on towards their final objectives.

When 50th (N) Division was withdrawn from the line and relieved by the recently arrived 56th (London) Infantry Division, 65th (8th London) Fd Rgt transferred to the London division on 22 April and remained with it until the end of the war. The inexperienced division was scheduled to take part in the Allied invasion of Sicily (Operation Husky), but as soon as it arrived it was thrown into the last stages of the Tunisian Campaign, because Gen Montgomery did not want an untried division in Husky. Given the task of capturing Tarhuna during the night of 28/29 April, it succeeded but was driven off the position the following morning. Montgomery realised that the division needed time to learn battlecraft. It went into action again during the final advance on Tunis (Operation Vulcan), moving north to meet 6th Armoured Division of First Army coming south, whose leading troops were able to spot for X Corps' guns via 56th (L) Division's wireless net.

56th (London) Division's formation sign featured Dick Whittington's cat.

==== Salerno to Anzio ====
Because of Montgomery's doubts, 56th (L) Division was not in fact used in Operation Husky. Instead it moved back to Tripoli in Libya for further training, and then put to sea on 1 September for the invasion of mainland Italy, landing at Salerno on 9 September (Operation Avalanche). H-Hour was at 3:30, the division's leading infantry landing craft touched down at 03.35 covered by naval gunfire, and 65th Fd Rgt's guns were all in action at 18:00.

Over the next few days the division fought its way forward to extend the beachhead against strong German counter-attacks, and the divisional artillery was heavily engaged in defensive fire (DF) tasks. X Corps began its advance out of the beachhead on the night of 22/23 September with massive artillery support and reached Naples on 30 September.

By 11 October, the division was on the Volturno Line but failed to cross the river the following day and had to wait until 16 October before it could cross and begin the pursuit through rough country beyond. This brought the division to the Bernhardt Line, where 65th Fd Rgt lent support to the attack of 201st Guards Brigade up 'Bare Arse Ridge' on 6 November during the Battle of Monte Camino. Attacks at Monte Camino continued in early December, with large numbers of guns in support, until the division seized the heights on 6 December.

56th (L) Division was next tasked with capturing a bridgehead across the Garigliano using strong artillery support (400 rounds per gun were supplied for the division's 25-pounders). The attack on the night of 17/18 January 1944 was successful and by morning the leading battalions were across and attacking with plenty of artillery support. The division began its breakout from the bridgehead on 23 January, but at the end of the month was ordered to pull out and go by sea to reinforce the Anzio beachhead. By 15 February the whole division had arrived and taken over part of the line under VI US Corps, in time to beat off the German counter-attack (Operation Fischfang or 'Catching Fish').

Trench warfare in the Anzio bridgehead continued for months. On 28 February the German I Parachute Corps began an offensive against 56th (L) Division that produced no change in the line. When the attack was widened to the front of 3rd US Division the following day, accompanied by unusually heavy support from field artillery, the whole artillery in VI Corps brought down a pre-emptive counter-preparation programme. Although this was too late to catch the German troops as they formed up, the attack made no real impression on the Allied defences. 56th (L) Division was by now so weak that it was relieved and on 28 March went by sea to Egypt for recuperation.

==== Italy again ====
56th (L) Division returned to Italy on 17 July 1944 and was assigned to V Corps for the attack on the Gothic Line (Operation Olive). When the offensive opened on 25 August 1944, V Corps was still moving up, and 56th (L) Division was its reserve, but its artillery was sent on ahead to strengthen the Corps artillery. Once the Corps had broken into the German positions, 56th (L) Division was used to widen the breach on 1 September, and then on 3 September to lead the pursuit, taking Monte Maggiore before opposition increased at the Gemmano–Coriano high ground. There followed hard methodical fighting to clear the Germans off successive ridge lines (the Battle of San Marino).

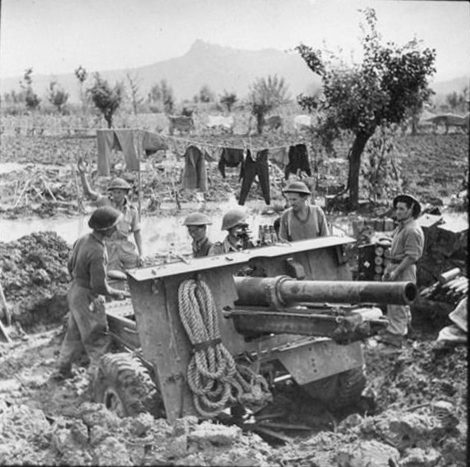
25-pounder and crew in a waterlogged position across the Rubicon, October 1944

On the night of 27/28 September 56th (L) Division attacked Savignano sul Rubicone on the Fiumicino river, supported by a 90-minute barrage fired by the heavily reinforced divisional artillery. Nevertheless, the attack failed, as did attempts to renew it on 29/30 September and 1 October. Later in October, the badly weakened 56th (L) Division was relieved in the line. While the infantry were recuperating, 56th (L) Division's artillery was brought up to reinforce V Corps' fire-plan for the capture of Forlì and the attempted crossings of the Montone on 8 November.

56th (L) Division returned to the fighting in December to cover the Lamone crossing (2–13 December) and then to clear the ground between the Lamone and the Senio, forcing its way into Sant'Andrea on 31 December. However, ammunition shortages limited the use of the artillery.

For the Spring 1945 offensive in Italy (Operation Grapeshot), 56th (L) Division was responsible for the operations on Lake Comacchio to outflank the Senio line (5/6, 10/11 and 13 April) allowing it to breach the Argenta Gap (15–19 April) despite the shortage of artillery ammunition. Once through the gap, 56th (L) Division drove on through German rearguards to the Po, arriving on 25 April and crossing immediately. The division reached Venice on 29 April. Here it was halted due to shortage of fuel. The Surrender of Caserta came into force on 2 May, ending hostilities in the Italian theatre.

56th (L) Division was made responsible for protecting lines of communication to the disputed city of Trieste in the immediate aftermath of the fighting. 65th (8th London) Field Regiment was placed in suspended animation on 15 June 1946.

=== 118th Field Regiment ===
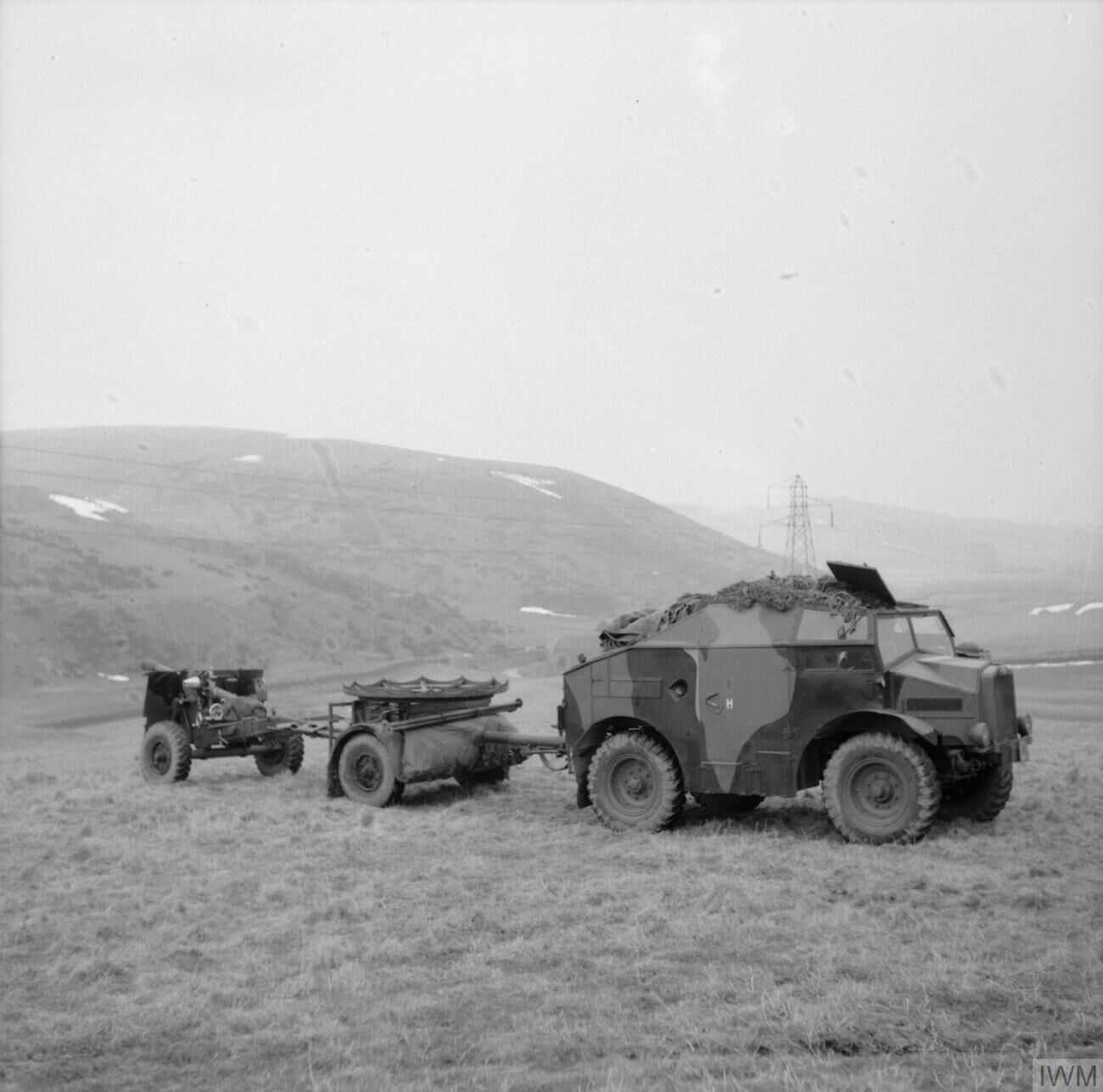
25-pounder gun (probably of 18th Division) on exercise in Scotland, March 1941

The 118th Field Regiment was assigned to the 12th (Eastern) Infantry Division on 7 October 1939, and it trained at Woolwich. In April 1940, the infantry of 12th (Eastern) Infantry Division moved to France, but the artillery remained in England to continue training. On 30 June 1940, the 118th Field Regiment was transferred to the 18th Infantry Division. The regiment was based in East Anglia on defensive duties until the end of the year, then moved to Scotland for training. On 18 May 1941 it formed its third battery, numbered 483. It departed for overseas service with the 18th Infantry Division on 28 October 1941. The regiment was destined to reinforce the Eighth Army in Egypt, however in response to the Japanese invasion of Malaya, the division was diverted to British Malaya and arrived in January 1942.

The 118th Field Regiment landed at Singapore, on 29 January, amidst Japanese air raids. The city was already under threat from advancing Japanese forces, and the 18th Infantry Division were stationed to defend the northern part of the island. The Japanese began a heavy bombardment of the island on 5 February, to which the British artillery replied with counter battery fire, together with harassing fire (HF) directed against Japanese preparations. The assault across the Johore Strait began on 8 February, gaining lodgements in the western sector, and by 12 February the 18th Infantry Division began to withdraw to the city's perimeter. It was involved in bitter fighting on 14 February, with the guns crammed into inadequate space under fire. By then 118th Field Regiment was positioned on the Bukit Timah Road. Captain Robert Johnson, acting as FOO for one of the regiment's batteries, rallied a group of infantrymen whose officers had been killed. Communications had broken down with his battery, he ran to and from RHQ under small arms fire with fire orders to be relayed to the guns. The fire that came down as a result of his action destroyed the enemy in front and rather than withdraw the infantry were able to regain some ground. Johnson was awarded the Military Cross. However, the regiment's ammunition was scarce and water supplies were running out. A small cadre from each unit was sent to Sumatra aboard the last boats to leave. The regiment spiked its guns by jamming a second round down the muzzle, before firing the last round using a length of signal cable, splitting the gun barrels. The force surrendered on 15 February. Twenty-two members of the regiment were rendered casualties during the fighting. Authorisation for the regiment to carry the '8th London' subtitle was officially given on 17 February 1942, two days following the surrender. The regiment was officially disbanded on 1 January 1947, when the TA was reformed.

Not everyone was prepared to surrender: John Crawley gathered 60 Non-Commissioned Officers and men, found a junk and sailed to Sumatra. Later they sailed for Ceylon, but were captured before they reached safety. Crawley spent the rest of the war as a resourceful adjutant of a Prisoner-of-war camp in Siam, and was severely beaten by the Japanese guards for his defiance. After the war, he stayed in Bangkok to assist the repatriation of PoWs. Lieutenant-Colonel C.E. Mackellar, the regiment's commanding officer, was previously a prisoner following the Siege of Kut in the First World War. He, and his second-in-command Major Sir Watkin Williams-Wynn, 10th Baronet, survived the notorious PoW camps on the Burma Railway. Mackellar insisted on keeping up standards in the camps, and spent many months in solitary confinement. 182 men of the regiment died, forced to work on the Burma railway. A further 72 died during captivity after work was completed, including 43 when a Japanese convoy carrying prisoners to Japan was attacked by US Navy submarines.

== Postwar ==
In the reformed TA the regiment became 265 (8th London) Heavy Anti-Aircraft Regiment, RA, at Napier House, Grove Park, Lewisham, a modern drill hall rebuilt in 1937, while 265 HAA Rgt Royal Electrical and Mechanical Engineers (REME) Workshop was at the old HQ at 'Oaklands' in Plumstead. It formed part of 97 (AA) Army Group Royal Artillery.

Anti-Aircraft Command was disbanded on 10 March 1955 and there were wholesale mergers among the TA's AA units. 265 (8th London) HAA Regt merged with 460 (City of London) HAA, 567 (7th City of London) Light AA/Searchlight and 569 (The Queen's Own) LAA/SL regiments to form 265 Light Anti-Aircraft Regiment, RA, with the following organisation:

- RHQ at Grove Park
- P (7th City of London) Bty at Grove Park
- Q (The Queen's Own) Bty at Grove Park
- R (4th City of London) Bty at Catford
- S (8th London) Bty at Foots Cray, Eltham

A further round of mergers on 1 May 1961 saw the regiment amalgamated with 458 (Kent) LAA Rgt (less one battery) and 570 (First Surrey Rifles) LAA Rgt to form a new 265 LAA Rgt with the following organisation:

- RHQ and HQ Bty at Grove Park
- P (Kent) Bty at Bexleyheath
- Q (London) Bty at Foots Cray
- R (Surrey) Bty at Camberwell
- Light Aid Detachment, REME, at Bexleyheath

On 4 October 1961 the regiment dropped the 'LAA' part of its title, then on 18 March 1964 'Light Air Defence' was substituted. When the TA was reduced into the Territorial and Army Volunteer Reserve (TAVR) in 1967, the regiment was split up. Regimental HQ, together with HQ Royal Artillery of 44th (Home Counties) Division/District, became RHQ for 100 (Eastern) Medium Rgt, RA, at Grove Park. The new regiment was composed of Yeomanry batteries and in the 1970s the 'Eastern' subtitle was replaced by 'Yeomanry'. In 1999 the regiment was reorganised, and a new 106 (Yeomanry) Rgt was formed with RHQ and 265 (Home Counties) Bty at Grove Park. The battery was later redesignated an Air Assault Bty. Napier House Army Reserve Centre at Baring Road, Grove Park, continues as the location of RHQ and 265 Bty.

In the 1967 reorganisation P (Kent) and Q (London) Btys joined the new London and Kent Regiment, RA. On 1 April 1969 the London and Kent Rgt was reduced to a cadre under 71 (City of London) Yeomanry Signal Regiment, Royal Signals, and soon formed HQ (265 London & Kent) Signal Squadron for that regiment at Bromley and Bexleyheath. In 1974 this became 265 (Kent and County of London (Sharpshooters)) Support Squadron. Meanwhile, the RA cadre was disbanded on 1 April 1971 to form C (London & Kent Royal Artillery) Bty in 6th (Volunteer) Bn, Queen's Regiment. In 1975 this was converted to infantry as D Company in a combined 6th/7th Bn Queen's, and the artillery lineage was ended.

== Uniform and insignia ==
From its formation in 1908 the TF's artillery units wore identical uniforms to the Regular Royal Artillery; the exceptions were the brass shoulder titles, which consisted of the letter 'T' over 'RFA' over 'LONDON', and the cap badge, which did not carry the motto Ubique (because the TF had signed up for home defence only).

During the Second World War, the 65th Field Regiment wore an embroidered shoulder title '65th (LONDON) R.A.' in red on dark blue in place of the standard RA title. From 1947 to 1955, 265 Field Regiment wore an arm badge consisting of a large oval shield divided in half horizontally with red over blue upon which was superimposed the White Horse of Kent over a scroll with the county motto 'INVICTA', below which were the letters KAV (for Kent Artillery Volunteers, the 8th Londons' parent unit) in white.

After the 1955 amalgamation, P (Kent) Bty retained the red lanyard originally worn by 567 LAA/SL Rgt, while Q (Queen's Own) Bty retained the supplementary shoulder title 'THE QUEEN'S OWN' originally worn by 569 LAA/SL Rgt. The RA does not possess Regimental Colours, but Q (Queen's Own) Bty also retained the colours of its parent unit, 20th Battalion, London Regiment (Blackheath and Woolwich).

== Honorary Colonels ==
The following served as Honorary Colonel of the 8th Londons:

- Col F. Griffith, appointed 12 July 1911
- Col E.H. Eley, CMG, DSO, TD, former CO, appointed 5 February 1924
- Lt-Col A.C.L. Theobald, DSO, former CO, appointed 5 February 1929
- Capt W.H. Bevan 1 January 1936
- Brig H.E.C. Weldon, CBE, continued with London & Kent Rgt 1 April 1967

== Memorials ==
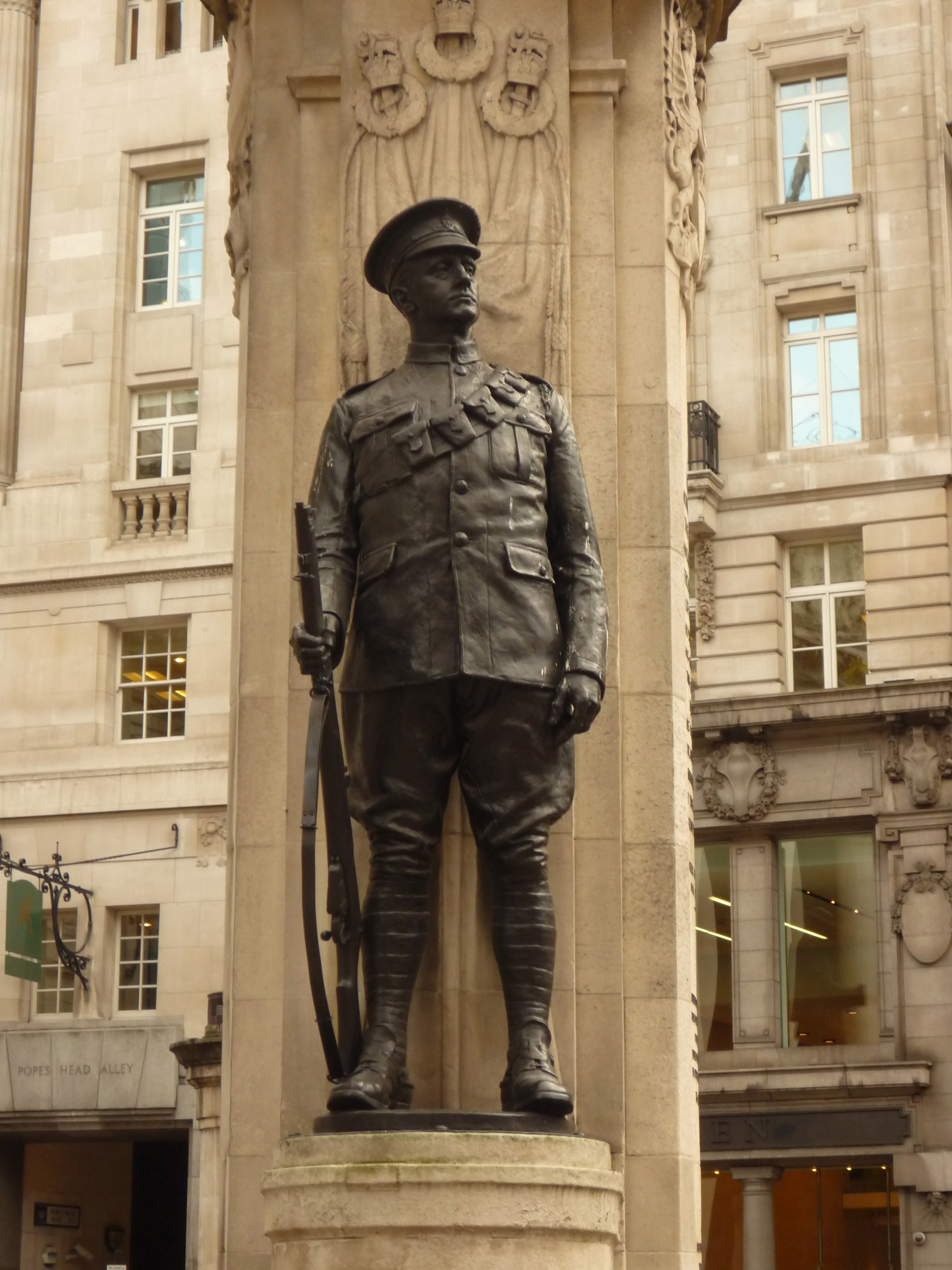
The artilleryman depicted on the London Troops Memorial

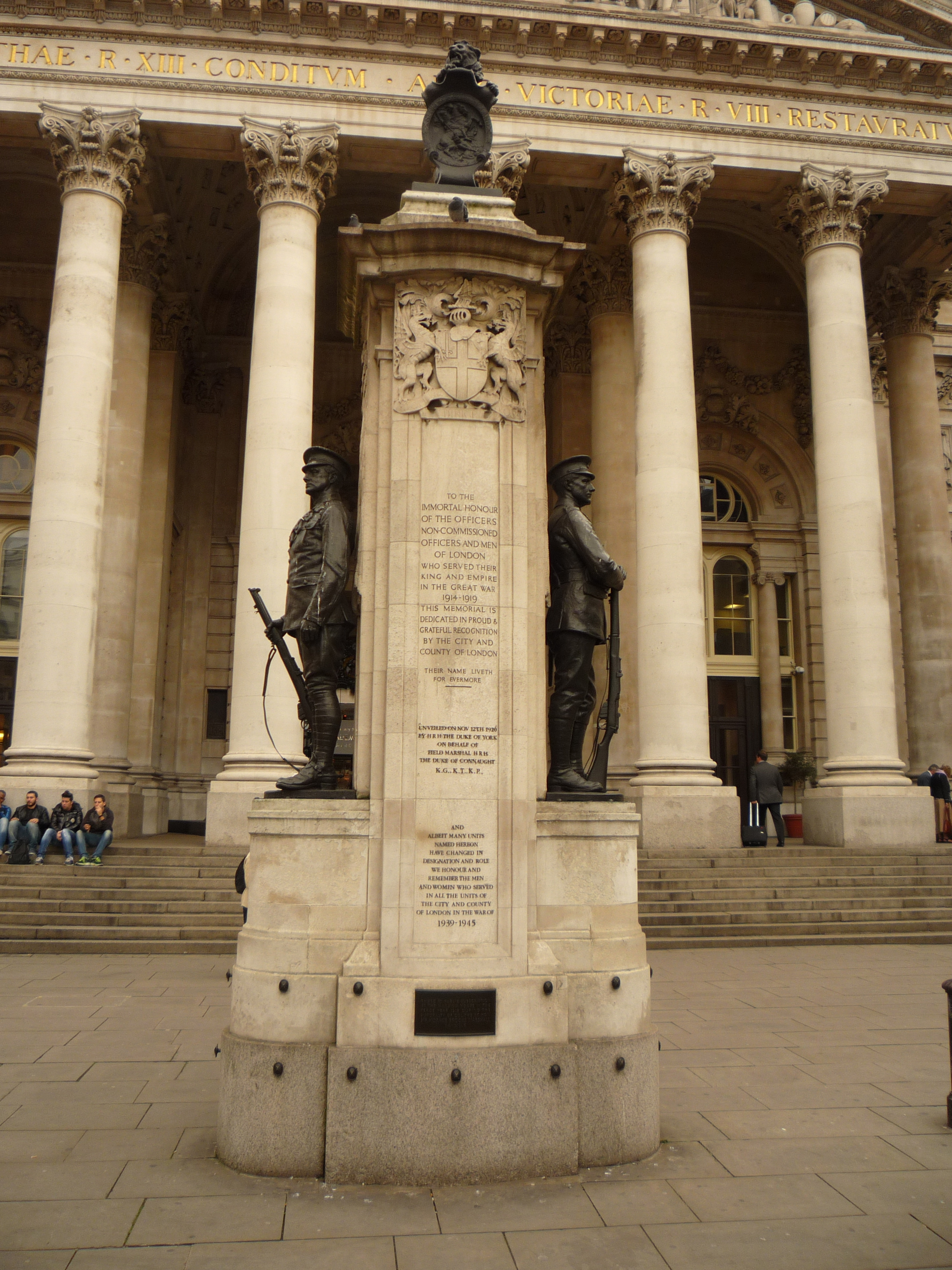
London Troops Memorial in 2013

The First World War memorial to 8th London Howitzer Brigade, RFA, is a stone obelisk on Plumstead Common. The brigade is listed on the City and County of London Troops Memorial in front of the Royal Exchange, with architectural design by Sir Aston Webb and sculpture by Alfred Drury. The left-hand (northern) figure flanking this memorial depicts a Royal Artilleryman representative of the various London Artillery units. Each unit listed on the memorial also had a bronze plaque; that for 8th London Brigade is at Napier House Army Reserve Centre at Grove Park.

Two wooden memorial crosses erected at High Wood and Eaucourt l'Abbaye by 47th (2nd London) Division in 1916 were replaced in stone in 1925. The restored wooden crosses were preserved at the Duke of York's Headquarters in Chelsea (the former divisional HQ), and are now at Connaught House, the HQ of the London Irish Rifles in Camberwell.

A bronze plaque bearing the Roll of Honour of the men of 65th (8th London) and 118th Field Rgts who died during the Second World War, previously at the Eltham drill hall, is now at Napier House.

== First-hand accounts ==
Captain A. Douglas Thorburn wrote an account of his experiences with 2/22nd County of London Howitzer Battery on the Western Front, at Salonika and Palestine.

== Sources ==
- Army Council Instructions Issued During April 1916, London: HM Stationery Office, 1916.
- Anon, Lewisham Gunners: A Centenary History of 291st (4th London) Field Regiment R.A. (T.A.) formerly 2nd Kent R.G.A. (Volunteers), Chatham: W & J Mackay, 1962
- Maj R. Money Barnes, The Soldiers of London, London: Seeley Service, 1963.
- Maj A.F. Becke,History of the Great War: Order of Battle of Divisions, Part 2a: The Territorial Force Mounted Divisions and the 1st-Line Territorial Force Divisions (42–56), London: HM Stationery Office, 1935/Uckfield: Naval & Military Press, 2007, ISBN 1-847347-39-8.
- Maj A.F. Becke,History of the Great War: Order of Battle of Divisions, Part 2b: The 2nd-Line Territorial Force Divisions (57th–69th), with the Home-Service Divisions (71st–73rd) and 74th and 75th Divisions, London: HM Stationery Office, 1937/Uckfield: Naval & Military Press, 2007, ISBN 1-847347-39-8.
- Maj A.F. Becke,History of the Great War: Order of Battle of Divisions, Part 3a: New Army Divisions (9–26), London: HM Stationery Office, 1938/Uckfield: Naval & Military Press, 2007, ISBN 1-847347-41-X.
- Maj A.F. Becke,History of the Great War: Order of Battle of Divisions, Part 3b: New Army Divisions (30–41) and 63rd (R.N.) Division, London: HM Stationery Office, 1939/Uckfield: Naval & Military Press, 2007, ISBN 1-847347-41-X.
- Col P.H. Dalbiac, History of the 60th Division (2/2nd London Division), London: George Allen & Unwin, 1927/Uckfield: Naval & Military Press, 2003, ISBN 978-1-84342-873-2.
- Brig-Gen Sir James E. Edmonds, History of the Great War: Military Operations, France and Belgium, 1915, Vol II, London: Macmillan, 1928/Imperial War Museum & Battery Press, 1995, ISBN 0-89839-219-5.
- Brig-Gen Sir James E. Edmonds, History of the Great War: Military Operations, France and Belgium, 1916, Vol I, London: Macmillan,1932/Woking: Shearer, 1986, ISBN 0-946998-02-7.
- Maj L.F. Ellis, History of the Second World War, United Kingdom Military Series: The War in France and Flanders 1939–1940, London: HM Stationery Office, 1954/Uckfield: Naval & Military, 2004, 978-1-85457-056-6.
- Capt Cyril Falls, History of the Great War: Military Operations, Egypt and Palestine, Vol II, From June 1917 to the End of the War, Part I, London: HM Stationery Office, 1930/Naval & Military Press, 2013, ISBN 978-1-84574-951-4.
- Capt Cyril Falls, History of the Great War: Military Operations, Egypt and Palestine, Vol II, From June 1917 to the End of the War, Part II, London: HM Stationery Office, 1930/Naval & Military Press, 2013, ISBN 978-1-84574-950-7.
- Gen Sir Martin Farndale, History of the Royal Regiment of Artillery: Western Front 1914–18, Woolwich: Royal Artillery Institution, 1986, ISBN 1-870114-00-0.
- Gen Sir Martin Farndale, History of the Royal Regiment of Artillery: The Forgotten Fronts and the Home Base 1914–18, Woolwich: Royal Artillery Institution, 1988, ISBN 1-870114-05-1.
- Gen Sir Martin Farndale, History of the Royal Regiment of Artillery: The Years of Defeat: Europe and North Africa, 1939–1941, Woolwich: Royal Artillery Institution, 1988/London: Brasseys, 1996, ISBN 1-85753-080-2.
- Gen Sir Martin Farndale, History of the Royal Regiment of Artillery: The Far East Theatre 1939–1946, London: Brasseys, 2002, ISBN 1-85753-302-X.
- J.B.M. Frederick, Lineage Book of British Land Forces 1660–1978, Vol I, Wakefield, Microform Academic, 1984, ISBN 1-85117-007-3.
- Gen Sir William Jackson, History of the Second World War, United Kingdom Military Series: The Mediterranean and Middle East, Vol VI: Victory in the Mediterranean, Part I|: June to October 1944, London: HM Stationery Office, 1987/Uckfield, Naval & Military Press, 2004, ISBN 1-845740-71-8.
- Gen Sir William Jackson, History of the Second World War, United Kingdom Military Series: The Mediterranean and Middle East, Vol VI: Victory in the Mediterranean, Part I|I: November 1944 to May 1945, London: HM Stationery Office, 1988/Uckfield, Naval & Military Press, 2004, ISBN 1-845740-72-6.
- Brig E.A. James, British Regiments 1914–18, Samson Books 1978/Uckfield: Naval & Military Press, 2001, ISBN 978-1-84342-197-9.
- Joslen, H. F. (2003) [1960]. Orders of Battle: Second World War, 1939–1945. Uckfield, East Sussex: Naval and Military Press. ISBN 978-1-84342-474-1.
- Maj-Gen S. Woodburn Kirby, History of the Second World War, United Kingdom Military Series: The War Against Japan Vol I, The Loss of Singapore, London: HM Stationery Office, 1957/Uckfield: Naval & Military, 2004, ISBN 1-845740-60-2.
- Norman E.H. Litchfield, The Territorial Artillery 1908–1988 (Their Lineage, Uniforms and Badges), Nottingham: Sherwood Press, 1992, ISBN 0-9508205-2-0.
- Cliff Lord & Graham Watson, Royal Corps of Signals: Unit Histories of the Corps (1920–2001) and its Antecedents, Solihull: Helion, 2003, ISBN 1-874622-92-2.
- Alan H. Maude (ed.), The History of the 47th (London) Division 1914–1919, London: Amalgamated Press, 1922/Uckfield: Naval & Military Press, 2002, ISBN 1-84342-205-0.
- Capt Wilfred Miles, History of the Great War: Military Operations, France and Belgium 1916, Vol II, 2nd July 1916 to the End of the Battles of the Somme, London: Macmillan, 1938/Imperial War Museum & Battery Press, 1992, ISBN 0-89839-169-5.
- Brig C.J.C. Molony,History of the Second World War, United Kingdom Military Series: The Mediterranean and Middle East, Vol V: The Campaign in Sicily 1943 and the Campaign in Italy 3rd September 1943 to 31st March 1944, London: HM Stationery Office, 1973/Uckfield, Naval & Military Press, 2004, ISBN 1-845740-69-6.
- Brig C.J.C. Molony, History of the Second World War, United Kingdom Military Series: The Mediterranean and Middle East, Vol VI: Victory in the Mediterranean, Part I: 1st April to 4th June 1944, London: HM Stationery Office, 1987/Uckfield, Naval & Military Press, 2004, ISBN 1-845740-70-X.
- The Memoirs of Field Marshal Viscount Montgomery of Alamein, London: Collins, 1958.
- Maj-Gen I.S.O. Playfair, History of the Second World War, United Kingdom Military Series: The Mediterranean and Middle East, Vol II: The Germans come to the aid of their Ally (1941), London: HM Stationery Office, 1956/Uckfield, Naval & Military Press, 2004 ISBN 1-845740-66-1.
- Maj-Gen I.S.O. Playfair, History of the Second World War, United Kingdom Military Series: The Mediterranean and Middle East, Vol III: (September 1941 to September 1942) British Fortunes reach their Lowest Ebb, London: HM Stationery Office, 1960 /Uckfield, Naval & Military Press, 2004, ISBN 1-845740-67-X
- Maj-Gen I.S.O. Playfair & Brig C.J.C. Molony, History of the Second World War, United Kingdom Military Series: The Mediterranean and Middle East, Vol IV: The Destruction of the Axis forces in Africa, London: HM Stationery Office, 1966/Uckfield, Naval & Military Press, 2004, ISBN 1-845740-68-8.
- Lt-Col J.D. Sainsbury, The Hertfordshire Yeomanry Regiments, Royal Artillery, Part 1: The Field Regiments 1920-1946, Welwyn: Hertfordshire Yeomanry and Artillery Trust/Hart Books, 1999, ISBN 0-948527-05-6.
- Capt A. Douglas Thorburn, Amateur Gunners: the Adventures of an Amateur Soldier in France. Salonika and Palestine in the Royal Field Artillery, Recording Some Exploits of the 2/22nd County of London Howitzer Battery RFA on Active Service, Liverpool: William Potter, 1933.
- Alan Wakefield and Simon Moody, Under the Devil's Eye: Britain's Forgotten Army at Salonika 1915–1918, Stroud: Sutton, 2004, ISBN 0-7509-3537-5.
- War Office, Titles and Designations of Formations and Units of the Territorial Army, London: War Office, 7 November 1927 (RA sections also summarised in Litchfield, Appendix IV).

== External sources ==
- Imperial War Museum, War Memorials Register
- Lewisham War Memorials
- The Long, Long Trail
- Orders of Battle at Patriot Files
- Land Forces of Britain, the Empire and Commonwealth – Regiments.org (archive site)
- Stepping Forward: A Tribute to the Volunteer Military Reservists and Supporting Auxiliaries of Greater London
- Graham Watson, The Territorial Army 1947
