= 44th (Howitzer) Brigade Royal Field Artillery =

XLIV (Howitzer) Brigade, RFA XLIV Brigade, RFA
- Active: March 1900 - 26 May 1916 early 1917 - by 10 July 1919
- Country: United Kingdom
- Branch: British Army
- Type: Artillery
- Size: Battalion
- Engagements: World War I: France and Flanders 1914-16; Palestine 1917–18; France and Flanders 1918

XLIV (Howitzer) Brigade, Royal Field Artillery was a brigade (Note: The basic organic unit of the Royal Artillery was, and is, the Battery. When grouped together they formed brigades, in the same way that infantry battalions or cavalry regiments were grouped together in brigades. At the outbreak of World War I, a field artillery brigade of headquarters (4 officers, 37 other ranks), three batteries (5 and 193 each), and a brigade ammunition column (4 and 154) had a total strength just under 800 so was broadly comparable to an infantry battalion (just over 1,000) or a cavalry regiment (about 550). Like an infantry battalion, an artillery brigade was usually commanded by a Lieutenant-Colonel. Artillery brigades were redesignated as regiments in 1938.) of the Royal Field Artillery which served in the First World War. It joined the BEF in August 1914 before being broken up in May 1916. It was reformed as XLIV Brigade, Royal Field Artillery in early 1917, serving in Palestine and the Western Front before being disbanded after the end of the war.

== XLIV (Howitzer) Brigade, RFA ==
XLIV (Howitzer) Brigade, RFA was formed in March 1900 as L (Howitzer) Brigade-Division, RFA commanding 56 (Howitzer) Battery and 149 (Howitzer) Battery and in 1901, 150 (Howitzer) Battery and 151 (Howitzer) Battery joined. In 1903, the brigade was redesignated as L (Howitzer) Brigade, RFA and in 1905, 151 (H) Battery was disbanded.

With a reorganization of the field artillery on 1 August 1913, the brigade was redesignated XLIV (Howitzer) Brigade, RFA. About this time, as the numbers of field batteries were reduced 149 (H) and 150 (H) Batteries were disbanded. The batteries were replaced with 47 (H) Battery (previously in XLI Brigade, RFA) and 60 (H) Battery (previously in XXXV Brigade, RFA), with most of the men from 149th Bty transferring to the new 47th Bty and those of 150th Bty to 60th Bty.

=== France and Flanders 1914-16 ===
In August 1914, the brigade was mobilized at Brighton at the outbreak of World War I under the command of Lieutenant-Colonel Sir Dalrymple Arbuthnot, 5th Baronet and was sent to the Continent with the British Expeditionary Force. It was assigned to 2nd Division, with 47 (H), commanded by Major H. W. Newcombe (previously Major A C Edwards), 56 (H), commanded by Major F E L Barker, and 60 (H) Battery, commanded by Major H J A Mackey, each equipped with six 4.5" howitzers. The newly formed Brigade Ammunition Column (BAC) was commanded by Captain G R Miller. The Adjutant was Captain G C Nevile; Orderly Officer Lt F L V Mills; Medical Officer: Captain Timothy W O Sexton; and Veterinary Officer: Captain L L Dixon. The RSM was John Thomas Coleman.

The brigade saw considerable action with 2nd Division in 1914, in the retreat from Mons (August), on the Marne and the Aisne (September) and at the First Battle of Ypres (October and November). More action followed in 1915, including the battles of Festubert (May) and Loos (September and October) and of the Hohenzollern Redoubt (October).

On 23 June 1915, 60 (H) Battery was withdrawn and assigned to the divisional artillery of 3rd (Lahore) Division.

In May 1916, the artillery brigades of infantry divisions were reorganised; the pure howitzer brigades were disbanded, and their batteries attached individually to field brigades, in order to produce mixed brigades of three field batteries and one howitzer battery. Accordingly, on 23 May the brigade was broken up and the batteries dispersed amongst the other field artillery brigades of 2nd Division:

- 47 (H) Battery (less one section) to XLI Brigade, RFA
- 56 (H) Battery (less one section) to XXXIV Brigade, RFA
- one section of 47 (H) Battery and one section of 56 (H) Battery formed D (H) Battery of XXXVI Brigade, RFA

Each battery now consisted of four 4.5" howitzers.

== XLIV Brigade, RFA ==
XLIV Brigade, RFA was reformed in England early in 1917 with 340, 382 and 399 Batteries, each equipped with four 13 pounders. It was transferred to Egypt, landing at Alexandria on 27 May 1917. It reached Sidi el Bishr on 2 June and was reorganized and re-equipped as two batteries of six 18 pounders (399 Battery was broken up to complete the other two). 340 Battery was renamed A Battery and 382 renamed B. The brigade joined 74th (Yeomanry) Division at Rafah on 3 July.

=== Palestine 1917–18 ===
With the 74th Division, the brigade took part in the invasion of Palestine in 1917 and 1918. In October and November 1917 it fought in the Third Battle of Gaza, at the end of 1917 it took part in the capture and defence of Jerusalem and in March 1918 in the Battle of Tell 'Asur. On 3 April 1918, the Division was warned that it would move to France and by 30 April 1918 had completed embarkation at Alexandria.

Before moving to the Western Front, the brigade was reorganized:

- A Battery resumed its former identity as 340 Battery
- B Battery resumed its former identity as 382 Battery
- A Battery, CCLXVIII Brigade, RFA joined and resumed its former identity as 425 Battery
- C (H) Battery, CCLXVIII Brigade, RFA joined as D (H) Battery

The brigade now consisted of three batteries of six 18 pounders and a battery of four 4.5" howitzers. D (H) Battery was made up to six 4.5" howitzers in France on 21 May 1918 at Noulette.

=== France and Flanders 1918 ===
On 14 July 1918 the Yeomanry Division went into the line for the first time, near Merville on the right of XI Corps. From September 1918, as part of III Corps of Fourth Army, it took part in the Hundred Days Offensive including the Second Battle of the Somme (Second Battle of Bapaume) and the Battles of the Hindenburg Line (Battle of Épehy). In October and November 1918 it took part in the Final Advance in Artois and Flanders. By the Armistice it was in the area of Tournai, Belgium, still with 74th (Yeomanry) Division.

With the end of the war, the troops of 74th Division were engaged in railway repair work and education was undertaken while demobilisation began. The division and its subformations were disbanded on 10 July 1919.

== Bibliography ==
- Becke, Archibald F. (1935). Order of Battle of Divisions Part 1–The Regular British Divisions. London: HMSO. OCLC 4405016.
- Becke, Archibald F. (1937). Order of Battle of Divisions Part 2B. The 2nd-Line Territorial Force Divisions (57th–69th) with The Home-Service Divisions (71st–73rd) and 74th and 75th Divisions. London: HMSO. OCLC 4405016.
- Frederick, J.B.M. (1984). Lineage Book of British Land Forces 1660-1978. Wakefield, Yorkshire: Microform Academic Publishers. ISBN 1-85117-009-X.
