= 41st Brigade Royal Field Artillery =

XLI Brigade, Royal Field Artillery was a brigade (Note: The basic organic unit of the Royal Artillery was, and is, the Battery. When grouped together they formed brigades, in the same way that infantry battalions or cavalry regiments were grouped together in brigades. At the outbreak of World War I, a field artillery brigade of headquarters (4 officers, 37 other ranks), three batteries (5 and 193 each), and a brigade ammunition column (4 and 154) had a total strength just under 800 so was broadly comparable to an infantry battalion (just over 1,000) or a cavalry regiment (about 550). Like an infantry battalion, an artillery brigade was usually commanded by a Lieutenant-Colonel. Artillery brigades were redesignated as regiments in 1938.) of the Royal Field Artillery which served in the First World War.

== History ==
The brigade was originally formed with 9th, 16th and 17th Batteries, and attached to 2nd Infantry Division. In August 1914 it mobilised and was sent to the Continent with the British Expeditionary Force, where it saw service with 2nd Division until the end of the war. 47th (Howitzer) Battery joined the brigade in May 1916. It took part in most of the major actions, including:

- 1914 - The Battle of Mons and the subsequent retreat, including the Affair of Landrecies, the Rearguard affair of Le Grand Fayt and the Rearguard actions of Villers-Cotterets; The Battle of the Marne; The Battle of the Aisne and the First Battle of Ypres.
- 1915 - The Battle of Festubert and the Battle of Loos.
- 1916 - The Battle of Delville Wood and the Battle of the Ancre.

After the end of the Battle of the Somme in December 1916, the artillery was reorganised, and often deployed to support different divisions depending on need. For example, for the Battle of Vimy Ridge (9 to 12 April 1917), part of the opening phase of the British-led Battle of Arras, 2nd Divisional Artillery, including 41st Brigade, operated in support of 4th Canadian Division, which was responsible for the northern portion of the advance which included the capture of the highest point of the ridge followed by the heavily defended knoll known as "the Pimple" just north of the town of Givenchy-en-Gohelle.

It went to France with the following officers (see WO95/1313) and senior NCOs:

- Brigade HQ: Lt-Col Stephen Lushington, Adjutant: Capt F. Brousson; Orderly Officer: Lt Otto M. Lund; Medical Officer: Capt T. S. Blackwell RAMC; Vet Officer: Lt G. Williamson RAVC. The RSM was Samuel E. James (81063).
- 9th Battery: Major R. D. Wylde; Capt Henry Charles Rochfort-Boyd [died of wound, 4 December 1917]; Lt D. D. Rose; Lt N. H. Huttenbach; 2ndLt H. Price-Williams; BSM Albert Charles Hanks(84198); BQMS Arthur Charles Thorpe(16627)
- 16th Battery: Major H. F. E. Lewin; Capt C. R. B. Carrington; Lt S. Atkinson; Lt H. O. C. Anne; 2Lt G. Messervy; BSM W. Little (1745); BQMS William Kinsella (18552)
- 17th Battery: Major H. H. Bond; Captain H. H. Joll; Lt D. C. Stephenson; Lt C. T. Carfrae; 2Lt R. T. W. Glynn; BSM Alfred John Wark (4838); BQMS W. H. K. Hinton (33512)
- 41st Brigade Ammunition Column: Capt. G. St. L. Thornton; Lt H. G. Lee-Warner; 2Lt J. R. Cleland; BSM H. Lowe (26703).

Of these, the last of the original officers still serving with the 41st Brigade, Captain (acting Major) Gerald Messervy MC, was killed 9 October 1918, commanding 16th Battery.
