= History of the British 1st Division (1809–1909) =

Aspect of the British Army unit

1st Division; No. 1 Division
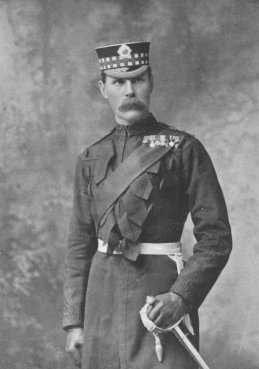
- Paul Methuen, who led the division during the Second Boer War
- Active: 1809 – present
- Country: United Kingdom
- Branch: British Army
- Nicknames: Peninsular War: The Gentlemen's Sons'; Second Boer War: Mobile Marvels; Mudcrushers; The Salvation Army; Beecham's
- Anniversaries: Peninsular Day
- Engagements: Napoleonic Wars; Crimean War; Second Boer War
- Website: Official website

The 1st Division is an infantry division of the British Army that has been formed and disestablished numerous times since 1809 and is still currently active as the 1st (United Kingdom) Division. Lieutenant-General Arthur Wellesley raised the division for service in the Peninsular War, which was part of the Coalition Wars of the Napoleonic Wars. The division was disestablished in 1814 but reformed the following year for service in the War of the Seventh Coalition. It then fought at the Battle of Waterloo, where it repulsed numerous attacks, including the final attack of the day that was launched by the French Imperial Guard. Following the battle, the division marched into France and became part of the Army of Occupation before being disbanded a few years later.

During the mid-to late-19th century, several formations bearing the name 1st Division were formed. According to the current division's official website, three such formations form part of its lineage. The first was formed in 1854 in Ottoman Bulgaria and took part in the Battle of Inkerman and the Siege of Sevastopol as part of the Crimean War; and was disbanded after the end of hostilities. in Africa in 1879, a new division was formed for service in the Anglo-Zulu War but made little impact on the campaign and was again disbanded once fighting ended. The final division to bear the name was formed in 1899 when the Second Boer War broke out. The division was raised in England, sailed to southern Africa, and then fought in most of the major battles to lift the Siege of Kimberley. These battles saw high casualties and were a mix of victories and defeats, and the division's defeat at the Battle of Magersfontein contributed to the political crisis of Black Week. The division saw more success in 1900 but was ultimately disbanded as the British Army reacted to the end of conventional warfare and moved to combat the guerrilla tactics adopted by the Boers.

While all of the earlier formations to bear the name were raised for a particular war, a new, permanent 1st Division was formed in 1902 in the UK. It fought in the First and the Second World Wars, was converted into the 1st Armoured Division in the 1970s, fought in the Gulf War, and was renamed the 1st (United Kingdom) Division in 2014.

== Napoleonic Wars ==
=== Peninsular War ===
During the French Revolutionary Wars and early in the Napoleonic Wars, the brigade was largest organised formation used by the British Army during campaigns. These consisted of two or more battalions grouped together under the command of a major-general, and suited the small size of the army and the operations it conducted. When needed, larger forces were assembled on an ad hoc basis; these included multiple brigades that were grouped into "lines" or "columns". As the army and its operations grew, it implemented divisions—a single formation of two or more brigades that was usually commanded by a lieutenant-general. The division concept was not new and had been used by other European armies towards the end of the Seven Years' War (1756–1763). On 18 June 1809, Lieutenant-General Arthur Wellesley (later known as the Duke of Wellington), commander of British forces in Spain and Portugal during the Peninsular War, reorganised his force into four divisions—the 1st, the 2nd, the 3rd, and the 4th.

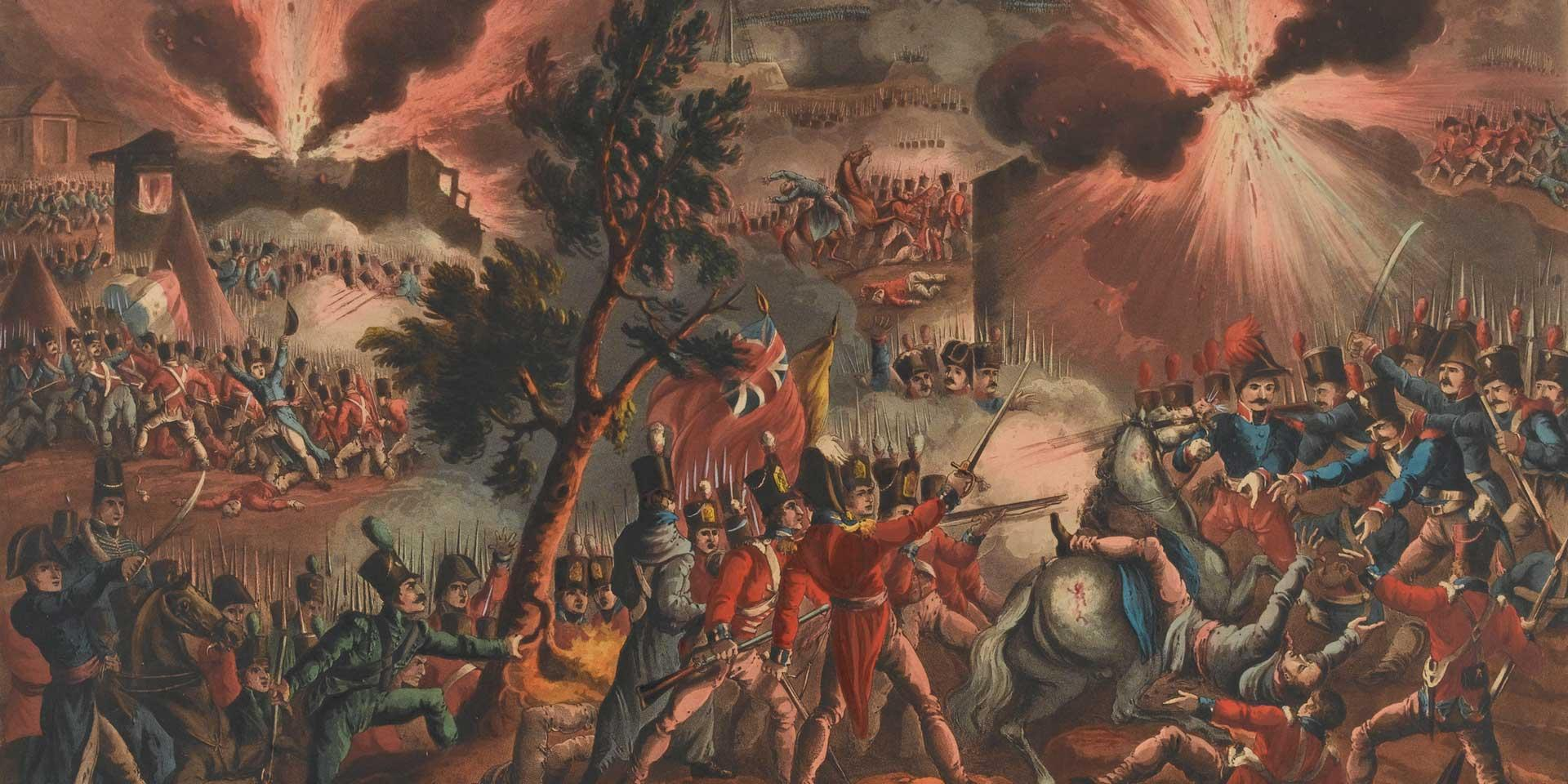
Depiction of the French sortie at the Battle of Bayonne, April 1814, by William Heath and Thomas Sutherland (click to enlarge).

On formation, the division consisted of one brigade of Foot Guards, one brigade of British line infantry, and two brigades of troops from the King's German Legion (KGL). Due to the inclusion of guardsmen, the division was considered a social but not a military elite and was nicknamed "The Gentlemen's Sons". The division of almost 6,000 men first saw action at the Battle of Talavera, where it formed the core of the Anglo-Portuguese Army. A brief action on 27 July 1809 resulted in 188 casualties but the main engagement of the battle took place the following day. Under intense French artillery fire, the 1st was approached by two divisions totalling 15,000 men. The British-German troops had been instructed to hold fire until the French were within close range, to deliver one volley, and then charge. Charles Oman, a historian of the Peninsular War, wrote the division followed these orders and that the leading French ranks "went down in swathes", with casualties amounting to one-third of the French force within ten minutes. The division then recklessly charged after the routed troops and ran straight into the French second line, which rebuked the British and German troops, forcing them to conduct a fighting retreat back to the main Allied position. Redeployed British forces ensured the division was not routed and the line held. By the end of the battle, the 1st had suffered 2,249 casualties.

The next engagement was at the Battle of Bussaco on 27 September 1810, where the 1st Division suffered 141 casualties. This was followed by a general retreat to the Lines of Torres Vedras and skirmishes during the Battle of Sobral. The following year, 828 casualties were suffered at the Battle of Fuentes de Oñoro (3–5 May 1811). In early 1812, the division took part in the Siege of Ciudad Rodrigo and then on 22 July fought in the Battle of Salamanca, where it formed the left wing of the army and defended the village of Arapiles. Back-and-forth fighting took place for control of the village, which resulted in 158 casualties. In September 1812, the division invested the castle at Burgos. Over the next four weeks, it repulsed several French sorties and launched two failed assaults with heavy losses. By the end of the unsuccessful siege, close to 2,000 casualties had been suffered. A general retreat from Burgos followed, during which the commanding officer Edward Paget was captured. His replacement, William Stewart, delayed part of the retreat when he ignored orders issued by Wellington.

In May 1813, a new campaign was launched. After a march north through Portugal, the Allied Army again entered Spain. The following month, the 1st Division fought in a series of battles; San Millan-Osma, Vittoria, and Tolosa, and was present during the opening days of the Siege of San Sebastián in July. (Note: A separate 1st Division, under the command of Major-General William Henry Clinton, operated during this period as part of Lieutenant-General John Murray's independent Army on the Tarragona.) In August, the division sent around 400 volunteers to assist in the storming of San Sebastián, with nearly half becoming casualties. The invasion of France followed; the division saw action at the Battle of the Bidassoa in October; it forded the Bidasoa River, pushed back the French defenders, and seized the village of Béhobie with around 160 casualties. Engagements at the Battle of Nivelle in November cost it 193 casualties, and the Battle of the Nive in December brought about a further 289 casualties. After a brief rest, the division forced the Adour in February 1814. Napoleon, Emperor of the French, had abdicated following the 1814 capture of Paris on 31 March while the 1st Division was besieging Bayonne. On 14 April, the French sortied and the division fought in the final battle of the War of the Sixth Coalition, suffering just over 700 casualties. With the war over, the formation was broken up along with the remainder of the army's divisions. The troops marched to Bordeaux, from where they either returned to the UK or were transported to North America to take part in the ongoing War of 1812.

=== Waterloo campaign ===
At the end of the fighting, British and Hanoverian troops moved into the Southern Netherlands—previously Austrian Netherlands—as part of an Anglo-Dutch effort to secure the territory while they awaited a political outcome to the war at the Congress of Vienna. On 11 April 1815, after the outbreak of the War of the Seventh Coalition upon Napoleon's return to power and the arrival of Allied reinforcements, the force in the Southern Netherlands was reorganised into divisions. The 1st Division was reformed under Major-General George Cooke and contained four foot-guard battalions, including one that had served with the division during the Peninsular War. The First British Brigade under Major-General Peregrine Maitland contained the 2nd and 3rd Battalions, 1st Regiment of Foot Guards; and the Second British Brigade, under Major-General John Byng, contained the 2nd Battalion of the Coldstream Guards and the 2nd Battalion of the 3rd Regiment of Foot Guards. The division was the only one within Wellington's new army that was composed entirely of British infantry, the other British formations included Hanoverian troops.

The 1st Division's first action of the new war came at the Battle of Quatre Bras. Arriving on the right flank at around 18:30 on 16 June 1815, by which point fighting had been ongoing for several hours, the division launched a counterattack to recapture Bossu Wood that had just been taken. The attack drove out the French but as the British troops advanced beyond the wood, they were repulsed by a second French line and forced back. Fighting continued in and around the woods and included the repulse of a French cavalry attack. Casualties reported for the period 16–17 June amounted to 46 men killed and 508 wounded. Two days later at the Battle of Waterloo, the division formed the right flank of the allied army's front line. Its four battalions were arranged on the reverse slope of the ridge that had been occupied by the Allied army. Their light infantry companies—alongside Hanoverian and Nassau troops—took up an advanced position at Hougomont, a walled farm complex within a wooded area that lay in front of the occupied ridge. The farmhouse and its surrounding area became a vital tactical location.

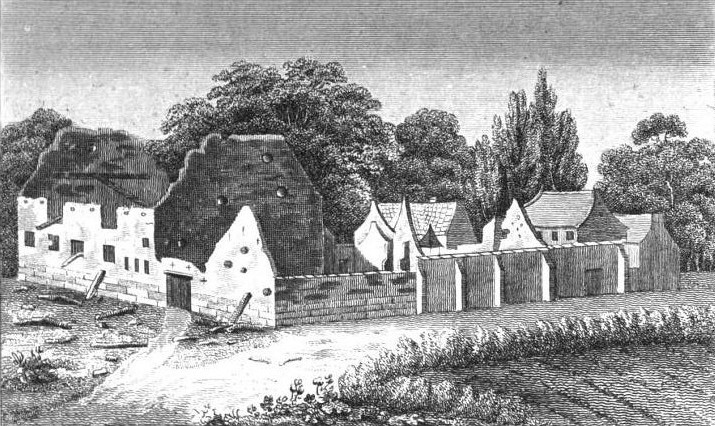
A depiction of Hougomont, after the battle, J.B. Romberg (1820).

In the late morning, Napoleon ordered the farm complex and its environs to be captured, beginning the battle. As French troops moved forward, the guns of the 1st Division opened fire and checked several advances. They were not able to completely halt the French, who advanced into the woods and drove the division's infantry back into the farm complex. Sous-Lieutenant Legros, leading a group of French troops, used an axe to breach the gates, allowing a large number of French troops to enter the complex's courtyard. In the following melee, the gates were closed despite the efforts of additional French troops to enter, trapping those within—all of whom were eventually killed in hand-to-hand fighting or were shot by defenders within the buildings. Lieutenant-Colonel James Macdonell and Corporal James Graham were noted for their efforts. As the fighting around the farm continued, Byng's brigade was fully committed to the defence. French troops attempted to encircle Hougomont and attack from the rear. The division's guns again caused the French problems and fresh infantry were moved to check the French moves. An attempt to assault and scale the complex's northern wall and to open the gate from the inside was repulsed. French artillery fire was maintained throughout the day, causing damage to the walls, setting several buildings ablaze, and collapsing the main building's roof. A renewed attack in the late afternoon was also driven off. The final main French assault of the day, which was launched in the evening, was led by skirmishers who engaged with the Hougomont garrison while the main assault pushed past the area to the Allied-held ridge. Following the defeat of the French units, the Allied army conducted a general advance and poured into the Hougomont area to reinforce and clear the position.

Maitland's brigade, while based on the crest of the ridge, spent the entire day under heavy French cannon fire, and repulsed several attacks by cavalry and infantry. Around 19:00, the Middle Guard of the Imperial Guard launched the final French attack of the day. In preparation, Maitland's brigade was formed into a four-ranks-deep line and was ordered to lie down. The French attack, due to the disorganised manner in which the troops assembled, came in several waves. The 3rd and 4th Régiment de Chasseurs led under heavy cannon fire that diminished as they closed on the ridge, due to dwindling ammunition stocks. Wellington then reportedly shouted, "Up, Guards, make ready!". The sudden appearance of the brigade caused the French to halt and start to deploy to exchange volleys. Maitland's two battalions heavily engaged the 4th Chasseurs and forced them to retreat. The British Guards followed with a bayonet charge. The sight of these two events, in conjunction with being under heavy attack themselves, resulted in the 3rd Chasseurs also retreating. The next wave was led by the 3rd Régiment de Grenadiers, who were joined by other Middle Guard units and regular French infantry. Maitland's troops halted their chase of the Chasseurs and reformed. Both sides then engaged in a ferocious exchange of volleys. While the French were concentrated on Maitland's men, the British 2nd Division conducted a flanking manoeuvre, fired close-range volleys at the French, and charged, causing them to retreat.

During the battle, the division suffered 232 killed and 819 wounded, and four men were reported missing. The following day, in conjunction with the rest of the army, the division marched into France and arrived on the outskirts of Paris on 1 July. The French capitulated a short while later, ending the war. The 1st Division was chosen to form part of the Army of Occupation and remained in France until December 1818. It was disbanded when the British military withdrew from France and returned to the UK.

== Victorian era ==
According to the 1st Division's official website, its lineage includes the Peninsular War, the Battle of Waterloo, the Crimean War, the Anglo-Zulu War, and the Second Boer War. Other 1st Divisions were raised during the 19th century, each on an ad hoc basis. A 1st Division was raised in 1851 under Major-General Henry Somerset, during the Eighth Xhosa War. In 1857, an expeditionary force was formed from the Indian Army for service in the Second Opium War. The force contained a 1st Division, which was under the command of Major-General John Michel. Major-General Charles Staveley took command of a 1st Division, which was around 10,000 men strong and was formed in September 1871 solely for training manoeuvres in England. During the 1882 Anglo-Egyptian War, Lieutenant-General George Willis commanded another newly established 1st Division.

=== Crimean War ===
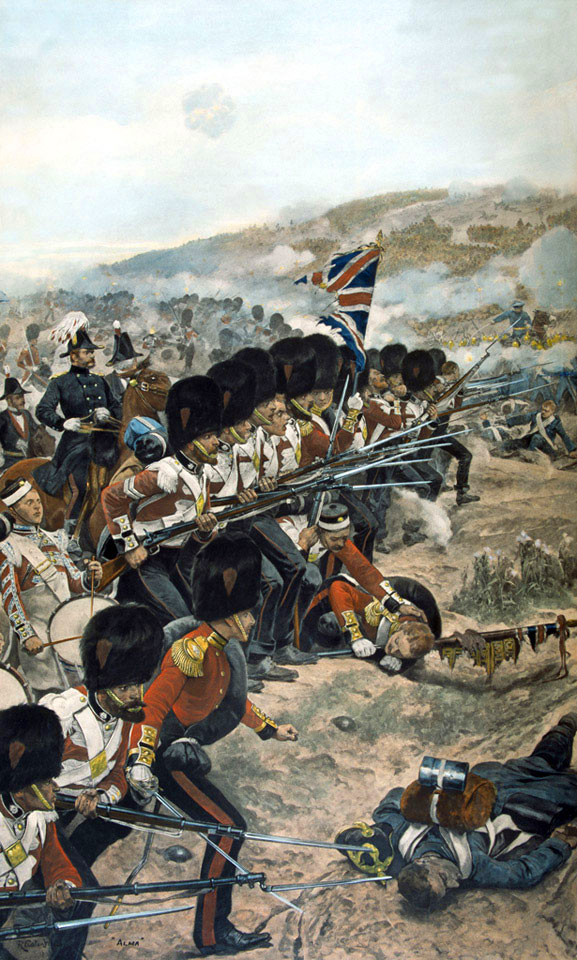
Richard Caton Woodville's depiction of the division's attack during the Battle of the Alma, although it includes inaccurate uniforms.

On 28 March 1854, in support of the Ottoman Empire, the British and the Second French Empire declared war on the Russian Empire. Anglo-French forces landed at Gallipoli to be in a position to defend Constantinople if needed, and then moved to Varna on the Black Sea coast of Ottoman Bulgaria, where they were reorganised into divisions. Prince George, Duke of Cambridge was appointed to command the 1st Division. Clive Ponting, a historian of the conflict, wrote Cambridge "was chosen ... solely because he was Queen Victoria's cousin". On 14 September, the Anglo-French expeditionary landed north of Sevastopol on the Crimean peninsula. They marched south and encountered the Russians at the Alma River, which blocked further progress. During the afternoon of 20 September, on the left wing of the expeditionary force, the division saw action in the Battle of the Alma. It crossed the river, then attacked and cleared a Russian redoubt on Kourgané Hill suffering 439 casualties. The advance resumed on 23 September and the expeditionary force surrounded the Russian port in October, beginning the Siege of Sevastopol.

In October, at the Battle of Balaclava, the 1st Division moved from besieging Sevastopol to reinforce British forces in the Balaclava area due to a Russian buildup of troops. Delays in the arrival of additional infantry and a changing tactical situation resulted in the division not engaging Russian forces, and the Charge of the Light Brigade was ordered. Following the ill-fated cavalry charge, it was decided not to commit the infantry to assault Russian positions. If they were captured, the positions would have needed to be occupied by the division and it could have invoked unwanted additional Russian attacks in the area whereas the division was more needed around Sevastopol. (Note: By the time of the battle, the 93rd (Sutherland Highlanders) Regiment of Foot had been detached from the division and had been assigned to the Balaclava defences. During the battle, it was engaged by Russian cavalry in a famous incident known as the Thin Red Line.) On 5 November, the Russian Army launched a major attack known as the Battle of Inkerman. The 1st Division, containing three battalions after leaving half of its force to defend Balaclava, moved to reinforce the embattled 2nd Division. In a heavy mist, the Russian force was engaged in close-range fighting with bayonets. Throughout the morning, 582 men of the division were killed or wounded or reported missing. During the fighting, the Duke of Cambridge had his horse shot from under him and he retired from the battle. Although the battle ended in an Allied victory, it created conditions that lengthened the siege through the winter into 1855. In 1855, the Light and the 2nd Divisions saw most of the fighting. During the assault on Sevastopol in June, the 1st Division was tasked in a supporting role, and it was held in reserve in September during the Battle of the Great Redan. The expeditionary force remained in the Crimea until the war ended in 1856, after which the army demobilised.

=== 1870s ===
Following the Franco-Prussian War (1870–71), the British Army reviewed and attempted to implement an organisation similar to that used by the Prussian Army. The resulting 1875 mobilisation scheme called for 24 divisions spread across eight army corps. These formations did not exist and the scheme looked for scattered units to merge in a time of crisis. This method was used to form three divisions, including the 1st, in 1871 when regular, reserve, militia, and yeomanry units—as well as volunteers from across the UK—converged on Aldershot, Hampshire, for training.

In January 1879, the Anglo-Zulu War broke out; over the following three months, back-and-forth fighting included the battles of Isandlwana and Rorke's Drift. Reinforcements were dispatched to Natal to prepare for a second invasion of Zululand, which resulted in the formation of two divisions. No. 1 Division consisted of British, colonial, and African troops, and was 9,215 men strong. The division made a slow advance into Zululand along the coastal plain, established forts and improved infrastructure as it moved, and was not engaged in combat. At the close of the campaign, the division was near Port Durnford on the uMlalazi River and accepted the surrender of neighbouring Zulus. With the war over, the division was broken up in July. Frances Colenso, who wrote about the campaign, stated: "An earlier advance and a little dash would have given the laurels of the second campaign to the 1st Division ... but it was not to be". According to Craig Stockings, Lieutenant-General Garnet Wolseley, who had arrived to oversee the final stage of the campaign, considered the division to have been "entirely irrelevant".

=== Second Boer War ===
The Second Boer War broke out on 11 October 1899 after tensions arose between the British Empire, the South African Republic, and the Orange Free State. In response, and to reinforce the British military presence in southern Africa, the British Government mobilised the Natal Field Force in the UK. This force, also known as the First Army Corps, corresponded with the I Corps of the 1875 mobilisation scheme, and included the 1st, 2nd, and 3rd Divisions. On mobilisation, the 1st Division consisted of the 1st—which was later dubbed the Guards Brigade—and the 2nd Infantry Brigades. The command was given to Lieutenant-General Paul Methuen. The majority of the division departed the UK between 20 and 24 October, and arrived at Cape Town around three weeks later. (Note: The final ship to depart did so on 29 November, carrying the divisional cavalry squadron, and did not arrive at Cape Town until Christmas Day.) Before their arrival, the Boers invaded the British Cape and Natal colonies, and besieged Kimberley and Ladysmith respectively. These moves changed the initial plan for the army corps, which had been to march on the Boer capital Bloemfontein. Instead, the majority of arriving force, which included the division's 2nd Brigade, was ordered to Natal to lift the siege of Ladysmith. The 1st Division was assigned to relieve Kimberley and allotted the 9th Infantry Brigade, which was newly formed from troops already based in southern Africa, to replace the 2nd Brigade. This brought the division to 7,726 infantry, and 850 cavalry and mounted infantry. Additional support was provided by the 3rd (Highland) Brigade, which secured the division's lines of communication.

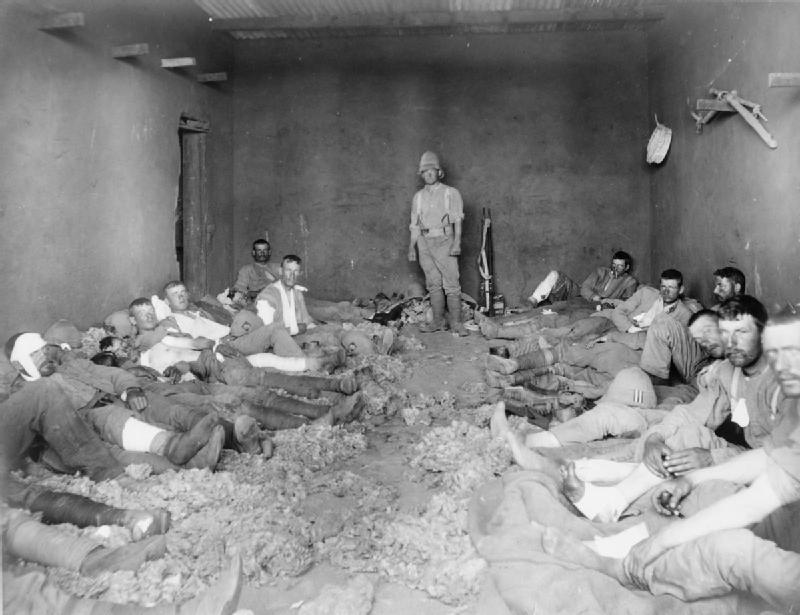
British wounded, probably following the Battle of the Modder River, lying in a makeshift field dressing station.

The advance towards Kimberley started on 21 November and followed the Cape Town–Kimberley railway line. After skirmishing with Boer forces, the 1st Division encountered the first prepared defensive position near Belmont, where the Boers had entrenched themselves on several hills that dominated the railway track. During the Battle of Belmont, which was fought on 23 November, the division assaulted and captured these positions just after daybreak, although the majority of the Boers withdrew in good order. British losses amounted to 54 killed and 243 wounded; Boer losses included 80 killed and 70 taken prisoner, in addition to the capture of draft animals and supplies. Frederick Maurice, author of the British official history of the war, lauded the small-unit tactics used by the division but said Methuen failed to convert the "successful engagement into a decisive victory". Stephen Miller, a historian who has written about the war, noted the battle "was a victory of sorts" for the 1st Division but that it was not "the decisive victory Methuen had wanted" due to the lack of mounted troops. This deficiency meant the division was unable to press or attempt to encircle the retreating Boers, who were able to escape and fight again two days later.

Similar battles and outcomes occurred on 25 and 28 November, when the Boers were engaged in the battles of Graspan and Modder River. Between the two battles, 628 casualties were suffered; Boer losses are not known but are believed to be low in comparison—Maurice stated at least 40 Boers were taken prisoner and 73 dead bodies were located. After the Battle of Modder River, the Boers destroyed a railway bridge and retreated to Magersfontein. The 1st Division remained in the area to rest, receive reinforcements, and assist in the construction of a replacement bridge until 10 December. The following day, the Battle of Magersfontein took place. Despite a preliminary artillery bombardment, the 1st Division's attack failed with 948 casualties. Boer losses are estimated between 236 and 275. In conjunction with other failed attacks that occurred during the same week, the news of events at Magersfontein led to the political crisis known as Black Week.

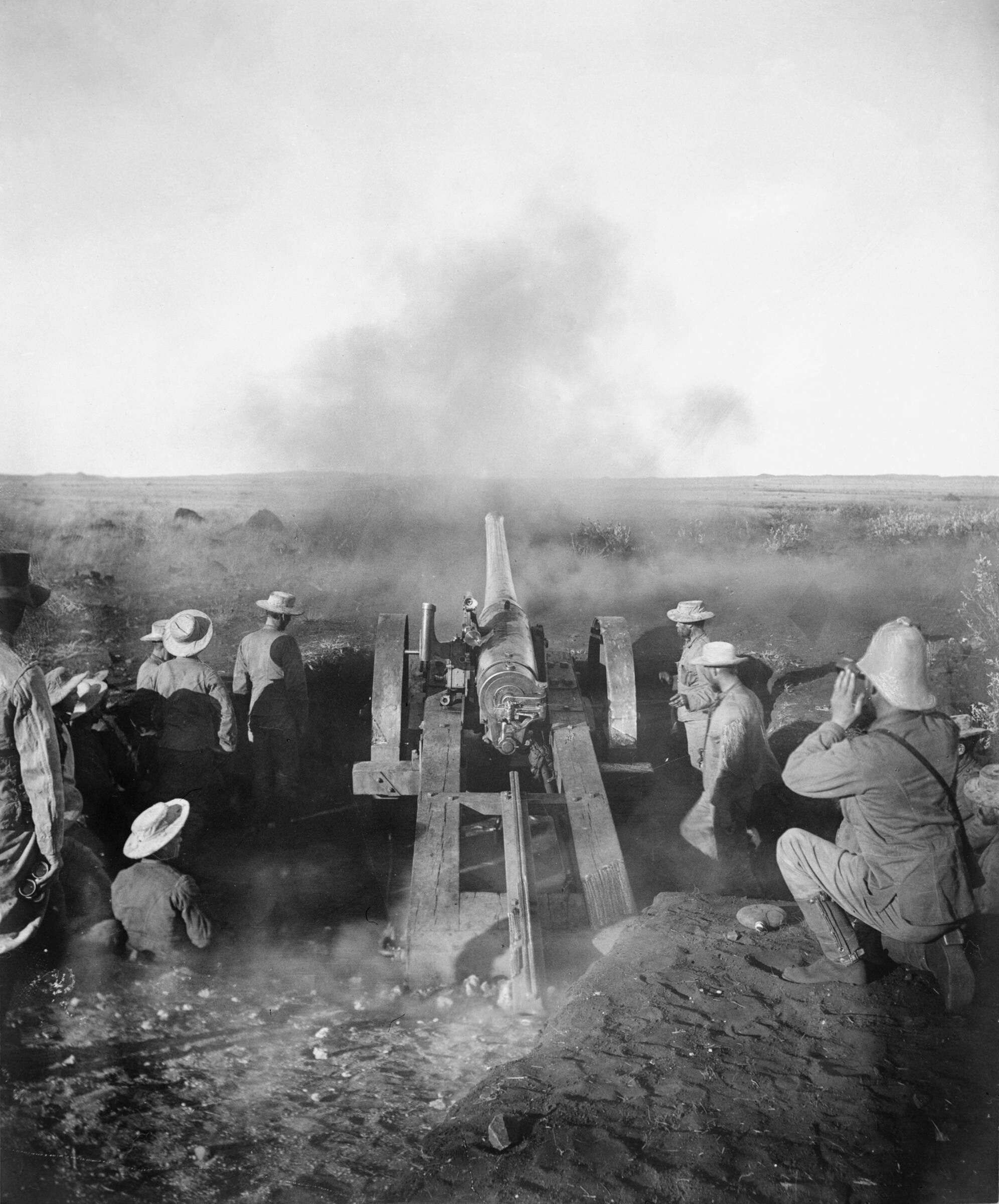
'Joe Chamberlain', a 4.7 in (120 mm) gun, firing as part of the preliminary barrage prior to the Battle of Magersfontein.

Having failed at Magersfontein, Methuen retreated and took up position on the Riet River, which was dubbed the "Modder position". Part of the political backlash of Black Week saw Methuen's command come into question; the War Office wanted to remove him. The preferred replacement was Lieutenant-General Charles Warren, who was commanding the 5th Division and had not yet arrived in southern Africa. General Redvers Buller, commander of the First Army Corps who was also under considerable political pressure due to Black Week, defended Methuen. This defence, coupled with a changing military situation and discussions about morale resulted in no change of command. From the "Modder position", the division conducted reconnaissance and raids into Orange Free State that destroyed farms, burnt crops, and seized livestock; a precursor to the large-scale adoption of similar methods later in the war. Such tactics have been seen as war crimes in breach of the 1899 Hague Convention. In January, the 1st Division was assigned a defensive role; that month, artillery, engineers, cavalry, and most of the division's transport were transferred to new commands, as was the Highland Brigade. Rumours of Methuen having scapegoated the brigade, in addition to heavy casualties that included the loss of their commanding officer, resulted in increasing animosity among the soldiers. Their new commander noted all were relieved when the transfer took place, and Methuen privately wrote he believed none would want to serve under him again. The division was provided with four 4.7 in (120 mm) siege guns to reinforce their defensive posture. Miller stated the division's presence prevented the Boers from attempting to invade Cape Colony during this period.

Behind the screen provided by the 1st Division, four additional divisions were assembled. On 7 February, a new offensive was launched; it lifted the siege of Kimberley on 15 February. During this offensive, the 1st Division was restricted to flank and lines of communication protection. Two days later, the division moved to Kimberley; the Guards had been transferred to a new division and the 1st Division now commanded one brigade. At Kimberley, it guarded the British forward supply base supply lines; it was also tasked with clearing the nearby area of Boer forces and supporting efforts to lift the Siege of Mafeking. To aid in these goals, a brigade of militia and a brigade of Imperial Yeomanry were attached. During March, the 1st Division advanced, seized several villages, reached Warrenton, and also repaired bridges and the railway line as they proceeded. On 5 April, a small Boer commando led by Comte de Villebois-Mareuil was defeated at the Battle of Boshof. While additional settlements were seized and patrols that took prisoners were maintained, the advance towards Mafeking ended and the town was relieved by forces that were closer. Thereafter, the division marched east, following the Vaal River, towards Kroonstad. The division covered 168 mi (270 km) in 15 days, captured small Boer forces and destroyed 12,000 rounds of ammunition. The 1st Division arrived at Kroonstad on 28 May and was nicknamed the "Mobile Marvels". (Note: Due to the same and similar feats, the division was also referred to as the 'Mudcrushers'. Due to their efforts in reliving besieged outposts or garrisons, the division was also nicknamed 'The Salvation Army' and 'Beechams' (from Beecham's Pills, a popular cure-all).)

In June, the division attempted to trap the elusive Boer leader Christiaan de Wet and relieve besieged Imperial Yeomanry. The first engagement occurred on 1 June near Lindley, where the division stormed Boer positions but found they had been too late to relieve the yeomanry. Skirmishing later took place without major engagements. Between 17 and 23 June, several divisions, including the 1st Division, were reorganised as the British Army reacted to the end of conventional warfare and to combat Boer guerrilla warfare tactics. Methuen's command, now a division in name only, became a flying column of five battalions with a force of 3,600 men supported by some artillery pieces and machine guns. The intention was to be more mobile and constantly searching for Boer forces. The rest of the division was transferred to similar columns or assigned to static defences to guard settlements or other vulnerable positions. The frustrating pursuit of de Wet and other Boer leaders went on for months. In September, the division lifted a Boer siege of Schweizer-Reneke, took 28 prisoners, and seized nearly 5,000 animals and 20,000 rounds of ammunition. By the end of 1900, the field divisions had ceased to exist; additional garrisons and mobile columns were formed as British strategy was further refined to counter the Boers.

== Reform period ==
In response to the lessons learnt from the Boer War, which included the army's failings in the opening months, the Secretary of State for War St John Brodrick set out to reform the standing army. He intended to create six army corps, three of which would be composed of permanent standing formations that consisted of the army's regulars. They would be ready for immediate dispatch in the event of an imperial crisis or a European war. In 1902, three corps were formed; these would allow up to nine divisions, each of two brigades, to be created; including the reforming of the 1st Division, which was finalised on 30 September 1902 when Major-General Arthur Paget took command. The reformed division consisted of the 1st and the 2nd Brigades, each containing four infantry battalions. The division, along with the 2nd and 5th, was regarded as being ready for war on the order of mobilisation.

In 1907, the Haldane Reforms further restructured the regular army into six infantry divisions, each with three brigades. These divisions would form the basis of a British Expeditionary Force (BEF) that would be dispatched to Europe in the case of war. The reform also replaced the army corps with regional commands. The changes resulted in the 3rd Brigade being assigned to the 1st Division; in addition to two field companies of Royal Engineers, two signal companies provided by the Royal Engineers, and three artillery brigades—each containing three batteries of guns. The 1st Division was assigned to Aldershot Command, where the 1st Brigade was located. The 2nd Brigade was based at Blackdown and the 3rd Brigade was housed at Bordon.

== History beyond 1909 ==
The 1st Division subsequently fought in the First (1914–1918) and the Second World Wars (1939–1945). In February 1945, it relocated to Palestine. During the early stages of the Cold War period, the 1st Division was garrisoned in Palestine, Libya, and Egypt, before it returned to the UK in 1955. It remained there until 30 June 1960, when it was disbanded due to there being no need for an additional divisional headquarters in the UK. The following day, it was reformed when the 5th Division was renamed and took on the 1st Division's history and insignia. The new 1st Division was based in Germany as part of the British Army of the Rhine. During April 1978, a reorganisation took place and the formation was renamed the 1st Armoured Division. Under this banner, in 1990–1991, it fought in the Gulf War. (Note: Not to be confused with the Second World War-era 1st Armoured Division, which was a separate formation with its own lineage.) When the Cold War ended, the British government restructured the army as part of its Options for Change programme, which saw the 1st Division again disbanded on 31 December 1992. In 1993, the Germany-based 4th Armoured Division was renamed the 1st (United Kingdom) Armoured Division. During the 1990s, the division was deployed to Bosnia as part of peacekeeping efforts during the Bosnian War, and in the 2000s it fought in the Iraq War. In 2014, the division was redesignated the 1st (United Kingdom) Division.

== See also ==
- List of commanders of the British 1st Division
- List of wartime orders of battle for the British 1st Division (1809–1945)
- List of Victoria Cross recipients from the British 1st Division
