= List of orders of battle for the British 1st Division =

1st Division; No. 1 Division; 1st Infantry Division; 1st Mixed Division; 1st British Infantry Division
- A white triangle was used as the divisional insignia during the Second World War.
- Active: Raised and disbanded numerous times since 1809
- Country: United Kingdom
- Branch: British Army
- Engagements: Napoleonic Wars; Crimean War; Anglo-Zulu War; Second Boer War; First World War; Second World War

An order of battle is a list of the various elements of a military formation organised within a hierarchical command structure. It can provide information on the strength of that formation and the equipment used. An order of battle is not necessarily a set structure, and it can change depending on tactical or strategic developments, or the evolution of military doctrine. For example, a division could be altered radically from one campaign to another through the adding or removing of subunits but retain its identity and prior history. The size of a division can vary dramatically as a result of what forces are assigned and the doctrine employed at that time.

The 1st Division was an infantry division of the British Army, which was formed numerous times from 1809 to present. Several formations bore the name "1st Division", from 1809 through to the end of the 19th century. Per the 1st Division's official website, its lineage is described as including the Peninsular War, the Battle of Waterloo, the Crimean War, the Anglo-Zulu War, and the Second Boer War. In 1902, following reforms within the British Army, a permanent 1st Division was formed that fought in both world wars.

The original 1st Division, formed in 1809, was around 6,000 men strong. This formation did not include supporting weapons such as artillery. In comparison, when the formation fought in the Second World War, it was over 18,000 men strong, supported by 72 artillery pieces, and numerous other support weapons. Each war that the division fought in, from inception up until the end of the Second World War, has a corresponding order of battle section.

== Napoleonic Wars ==
The division's first general officer commanding, John Coape Sherbrooke

During the Napoleonic Wars (1803–1815), the British Army grew in size. On 18 June 1809, Lieutenant-General Arthur Wellesley, commander of the British forces in Spain and Portugal, ordered the creation of four divisions, including the 1st Division. During the division's first action of the Peninsular War (the name given to Napoleonic Wars fought in Spain and Portugal), the Battle of Talavera (1809), it was 5,964 men strong. It roughly maintained this strength for the rest of the Peninsular War, for example being 4,854 men strong at the Battle of Vittoria in 1813. It was disbanded when the fighting ended in 1814. It was reformed on 11 April 1815, in the Southern Netherlands (modern-day Belgium), upon the resumption of hostilities. It fought at the Battle of Waterloo, where it had a strength of 4,061 men. It then marched into France. Shortly after, the Napoleonic Wars came to a conclusion. The division remained in the restored French kingdom, as part of the British Army of Occupation. In December 1818, the Army of Occupation and the division were disbanded, and the troops returned to Britain.

=== Talavera campaign (July 1809) ===
1st Division

Campbell's Brigade:

- 1st Battalion, Coldstream Guards
- 1st Battalion, 3rd Regiment of Foot Guards
- 5th Battalion, 60th (Royal American) Regiment (one company)

Cameron's Brigade:

- 1st Battalion, 61st (South Gloucestershire) Regiment of Foot
- 2nd Battalion, 83rd (County of Dublin) Regiment of Foot
- 5th Battalion, 60th (Royal American) Regiment (one company)

Langwerth's Brigade:

- 1st Line Battalion, King's German Legion
- 2nd Line Battalion, King's German Legion
- Light Companies, King's German Legion

Low's Brigade:

- 5th Line Battalion, King's German Legion
- 7th Line Battalion, King's German Legion

=== Battle of Bussaco (September 1810) ===
During this period, brigades were referred to by their commander's names. Due to changes in command, the brigade names fluctuated frequently.

1st Division

The division's 1st brigade:

- 1st Battalion, Coldstream Guards
- 1st Battalion, Scots Guards
- 5th Battalion, 60th (Royal American) Regiment (one company)

The division's 2nd brigade:

- 2nd Battalion, 24th Regiment of Foot
- 2nd Battalion, 42nd Regiment of Foot
- 1st Battalion, 61st (South Gloucestershire) Regiment of Foot
- 5th Battalion, 60th (Royal American) Regiment (one company)

The division's 3rd brigade:

- 1st Line Battalion, King's German Legion
- 2nd Line Battalion, King's German Legion
- 5th Line Battalion, King's German Legion
- 7th Line Battalion, King's German Legion
- Detachment of Light Battalions, King's German Legion

The division's 4th brigade:

- 1st Battalion, 7th Regiment of Foot
- 1st Battalion, 79th Regiment of Foot

=== 1810–1811, including the Lines of Torres Vedras and Fuentes de Oñoro ===
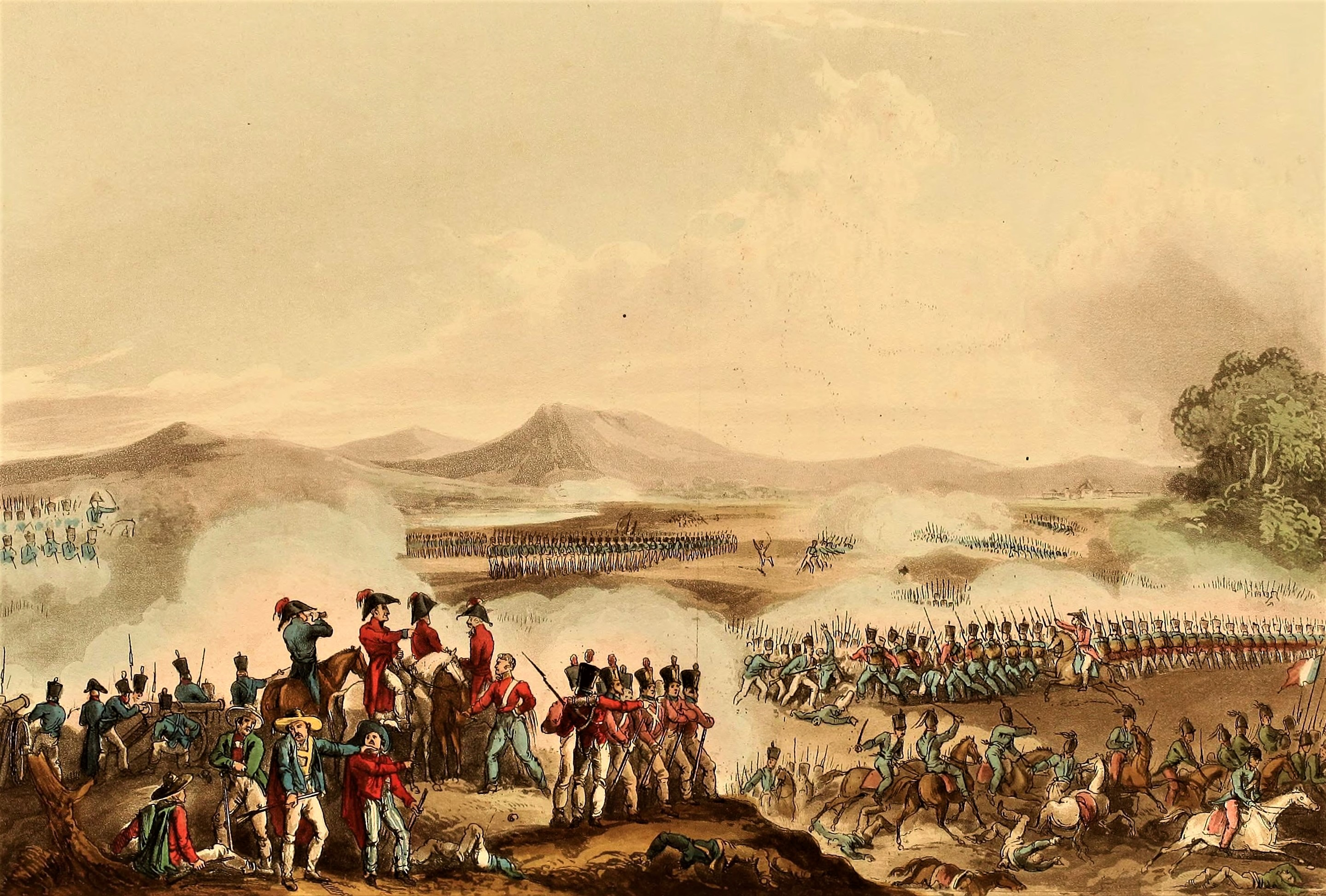
A depiction of the Battle of Talavera by William Heath, illustrating how British infantry looked and operated.

During this period, brigades were referred to by their commander's names. Due to changes in command, the brigade names fluctuated frequently.

1st Division

The division's 1st brigade:

- 1st Battalion, Coldstream Guards
- 1st Battalion, 3rd Regiment of Foot Guards
- 5th Battalion, 60th (Royal American) Regiment (one company)

The division's 2nd brigade:

- 2nd Battalion, 24th Regiment of Foot
- 2nd Battalion, 42nd Regiment of Foot
- 1st Battalion, 79th Regiment of Foot
- 5th Battalion, 60th (Royal American) Regiment (one company)

The division's 3rd brigade:

- 1st Battalion, 50th (Queen's Own) Regiment of Foot
- 1st Battalion, 71st (Highland) Regiment of Foot
- 1st Battalion, 92nd (Gordon Highlanders) Regiment of Foot
- 5th Battalion, 60th (Royal American) Regiment (one company) (left by 1 May 1811)
- 3rd Battalion, 95th Regiment of Foot (one company)

The division's 4th brigade:

- 1st Line Battalion, King's German Legion
- 2nd Line Battalion, King's German Legion
- 5th Line Battalion, King's German Legion
- 7th Line Battalion, King's German Legion
- Light company, King's German Legion

=== Battle of Salamanca (1812) ===
During this period, brigades were referred to by their commander's names. Due to changes in command, the brigade names fluctuated frequently.

1st Division

The division's 1st brigade:

- 1st Battalion, Coldstream Guards
- 1st Battalion, 3rd Regiment of Foot Guards
- 5th Battalion, 60th (Royal American) Regiment (one company)

The division's 2nd brigade:

- 2nd Battalion, 24th Regiment of Foot
- 2nd Battalion, 42nd Regiment of Foot
- 2nd Battalion, 58th (Rutlandshire) Regiment of Foot
- 1st Battalion, 79th Regiment of Foot
- 5th Battalion, 60th (Royal American) Regiment (one company)

The division's 3rd brigade:

- 1st Line Battalion, King's German Legion
- 2nd Line Battalion, King's German Legion
- 5th Line Battalion, King's German Legion

=== Vittoria campaign (1813) ===
During this period, brigades were referred to by their commander's names. Due to changes in command, the brigade names fluctuated frequently.

1st Division

The division's 1st brigade:

- 1st Battalion, Coldstream Guards
- 1st Battalion, 3rd Regiment of Foot Guards
- 5th Battalion, 60th (Royal American) Regiment (one company)

The division's 2nd brigade:

- 1st Line Battalion, King's German Legion
- 2nd Line Battalion, King's German Legion
- 5th Line Battalion, King's German Legion
- 1st Light Infantry Battalion, King's German Legion
- 2nd Light Infantry Battalion, King's German Legion

=== Battle of Nivelle (November 1813) ===
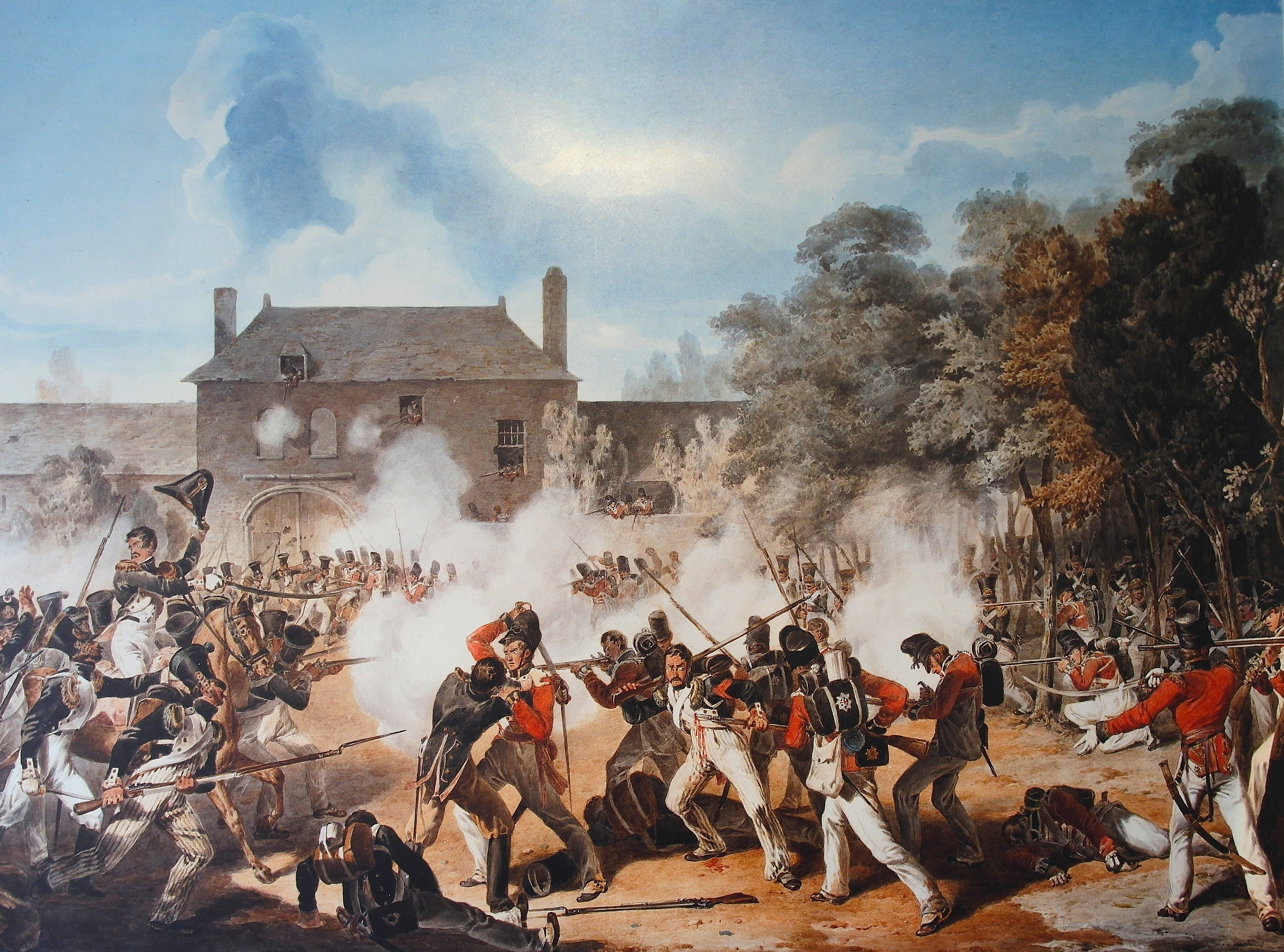
A depiction of the fighting at Hougoumont, during the Battle of Waterloo where the division was heavily engaged, by Denis Dighton.

During this period, brigades were referred to by their commander's names. Due to changes in command, the brigade names fluctuated frequently.

1st Division

The division's 1st brigade:

- 1st Battalion, 1st Regiment of Foot Guards
- 3rd Battalion, 1st Regiment of Foot Guards

The division's 2nd brigade:

- 1st Battalion, Coldstream Guards
- 1st Battalion, 3rd Regiment of Foot Guards

The division's 3rd brigade:

- 1st Line Battalion, King's German Legion
- 2nd Line Battalion, King's German Legion
- 5th Line Battalion, King's German Legion
- 1st Light Infantry Battalion, King's German Legion
- 2nd Light Infantry Battalion, King's German Legion

Lord Aylmer's Brigade (never officially part of the division, but acted alongside it following its August 1813 arrival):

- 76th Regiment of Foot
- 2nd Battalion, 84th (York and Lancaster) Regiment of Foot
- 85th Regiment of Foot (Bucks Volunteers)

=== Waterloo campaign (1815) ===
1st Division

First British Brigade

- 2nd Battalion, 1st Regiment of Foot Guards
- 3rd Battalion, 1st Regiment of Foot Guards

Second British Brigade

- 2nd Battalion, Coldstream Guards
- 2nd Battalion, 3rd Regiment of Foot Guards

Divisional Artillery:

- Captain Sandham's British Foot Battery
- Major Kuhlmann's Horse Battery, King's German Legion

== Crimean War ==
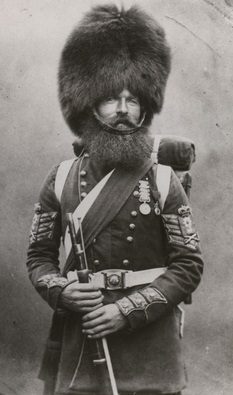
A portrait of Colour Sergeant William McGregor, Scots Guards, a member of the division who fought in the Crimean War.

In June 1854, a new 1st Division was formed following the reorganisation of a British expeditionary force that had been dispatched to Ottoman Bulgaria, to support the Ottoman Empire against the Russian Empire during the early stages of the Crimean War. The division proceeded to the Crimea, where it landed on 14 September. It was then engaged in the Siege of Sevastopol, including action at the battles of Alma and the Inkerman. At full strength, the division would have been around 4,800 men strong although at the Battle of Inkerman it contained a mere 1,200 infantry. The division remained in the Crimea until 1856, and demobilised following the conclusion of hostilities.

=== August–October 1854 ===
1st Division

1st Guards Brigade

- 3rd Battalion, Grenadier Guards
- 1st Battalion, Coldstream Guards
- 1st Battalion, Scots Guards

2nd Highland Brigade

- 42nd (Highland) Regiment of Foot
- 79th (The Queen's Own Cameron Highlanders) Regiment of Foot
- 93rd (Sutherland Highlanders) Regiment of Foot (detached in October 1854)

Divisional Artillery:

- A Field Battery (2nd Company, 8th Battalion)
- H Field Battery (5th Company, 11th Battalion)

=== November 1854–May 1855 ===
1st Division

1st Guards Brigade

- 3rd Battalion, Grenadier Guards
- 1st Battalion, Coldstream Guards
- 1st Battalion, Scots Guards
- 97th (The Earl of Ulster's) Regiment of Foot (had joined by January 1855)

Divisional Artillery:

- A Field Battery (2nd Company, 8th Battalion)
- H Field Battery (5th Company, 11th Battalion)

=== June 1855 ===
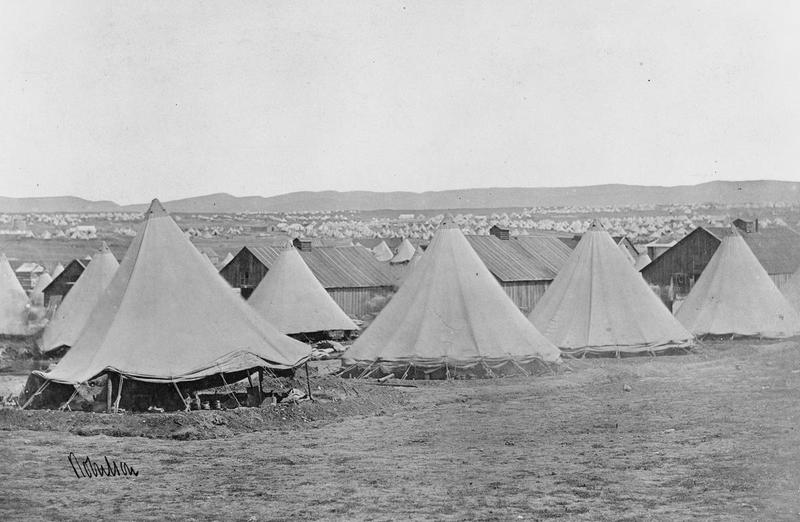
A view of one of the British camps in the Crimea

1st Division

1st Guards Brigade

- 3rd Battalion, Grenadier Guards
- 1st Battalion, Coldstream Guards
- 1st Battalion, Scots Guards

2nd Highland Brigade

- 42nd (Highland) Regiment of Foot
- 79th (The Queen's Own Cameron Highlanders) Regiment of Foot
- 93rd (Sutherland Highlanders) Regiment of Foot

=== August 1855–end of the war ===
1st Division

1st Guards Brigade

- 3rd Battalion, Grenadier Guards
- 1st Battalion, Coldstream Guards
- 1st Battalion, Scots Guards

2nd Brigade

- 9th Regiment of Foot
- 13th Regiment of Foot
- 31st (Huntingdonshire) Regiment of Foot
- 2nd Battalion, Rifle Brigade (The Prince Consort's Own) (had left by September)
- 56th (West Essex) Regiment of Foot (had joined by September)

Divisional Artillery:

- X Field Battery (temporarily detached from the division during September fighting)

== Anglo-Zulu War ==
The Anglo-Zulu War broke out in January 1879. After three months of back and forth fighting, which saw the battles of Isandlwana and Rorke's Drift, reinforcements were dispatched to Natal for a renewed offensive. This saw the creation of No. 1 Division, which was just over 9,000 men strong. The force comprised 6,508 British regulars and colonial irregular troops, supplemented by 2,707 Africans that included 151 mounted troops. The division saw little fighting and was largely engaged in engineering work. When the war ended, the division was broken-up in July.

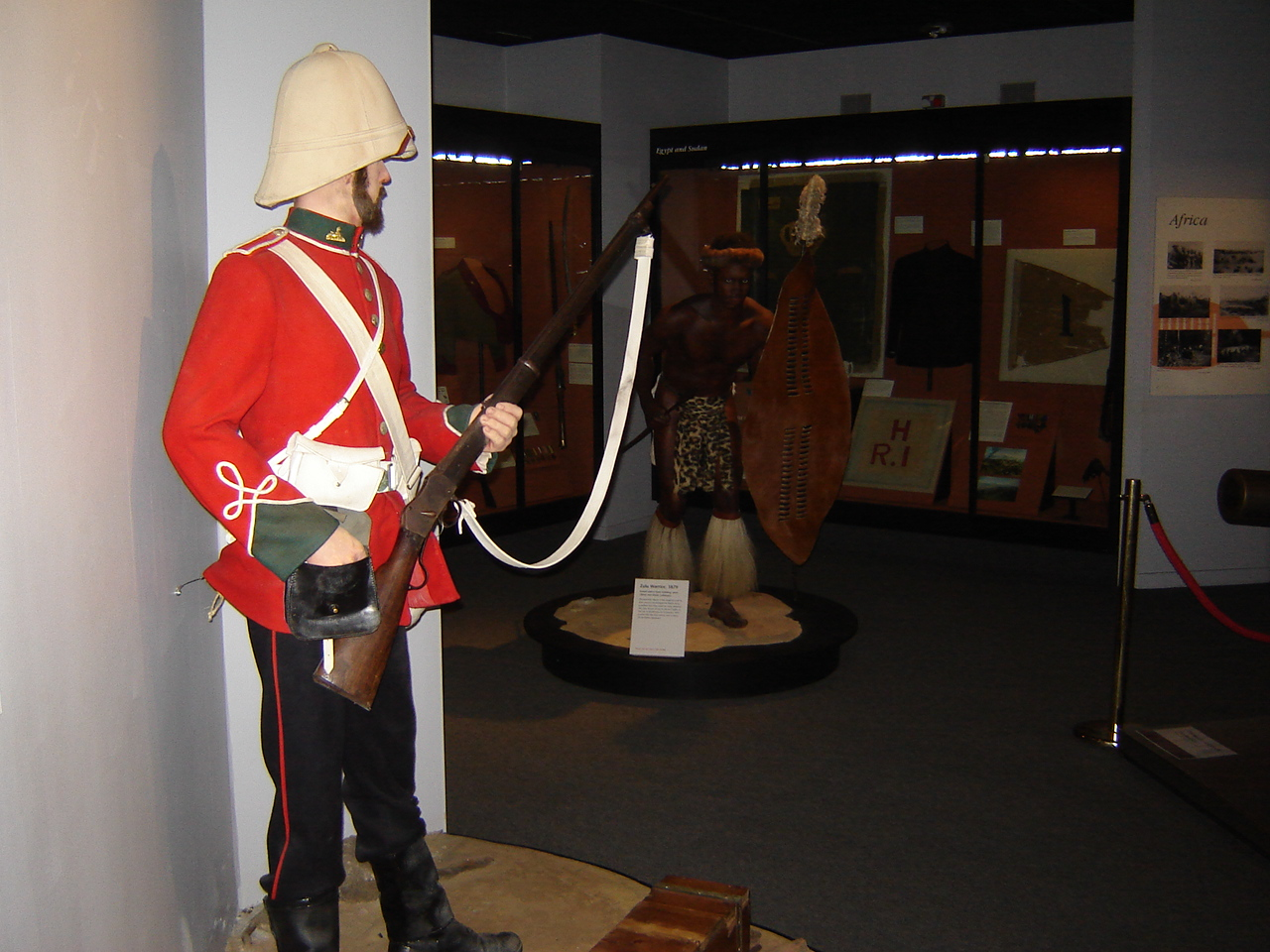
A depiction of a British soldier and a Zulu warrior from this period; National Army Museum, London

No. 1 Division

1st brigade

- 2nd Battalion, 3rd Regiment of Foot
- 88th Regiment of Foot (Connaught Rangers)
- 99th (Lanarkshire) Regiment of Foot

2nd Brigade

- 57th (West Middlesex) Regiment of Foot
- 3rd Battalion, King's Royal Rifle Corps
- 91st (Argyllshire Highlanders) Regiment of Foot

Divisional troops

- Three batteries, Royal Artillery
- Naval Brigade (artillery)
- Ammunition column, Royal Artillery
- 30th Company, Royal Engineers
- 4th Battalion, Natal Native Contingent
- 5th Battalion, Natal Native Contingent
- John Robert Dunn's scouts
- Attached mounted troops

== Second Boer War ==
A new 1st Division was mobilised in England, following the outbreak of the Second Boer War with the South African Republic and the Orange Free State. On mobilisation, the division consisted of 10,075 men, 745 horses, and 26 guns. It was transported to southern Africa, and then fought a series of battles as part of the attempt to lift the Siege of Kimberley, with mixed results and heavy casualties. During the opening months of 1900, the division held a largely defensive role although it did commit raids to destroy farms, crops, and to seize livestock. Between April and early June, it engaged various Boer Commandos as it marched through the Orange Free State and Transvaal. In mid-June, the division was radically changed in an effort to form a more mobile force to counter the Boer guerrilla warfare tactics. By the end of the year, it had been disbanded as the counter-guerrilla strategy was further refined.

At its first engagement, the Battle of Belmont, the formation consisted of 10,012 troops, 2,299 animals, 16 pieces of artillery, and 10 machine guns. A fortnight later, the division was reinforced for the Battle of Magersfontein and mustered 14,964 men supported by 3,723 animals, 33 artillery pieces, and 16 machine guns. In June 1900, when the division was reformed into a flying column, there was a significant reduction in manpower in order to be more mobile. At that time, it consisted of 1,200 mounted troops, 2,400 infantry, 12 field guns, two 5 in (130 mm) howitzers, and 11 machine guns.

=== On mobilisation in 1899 ===
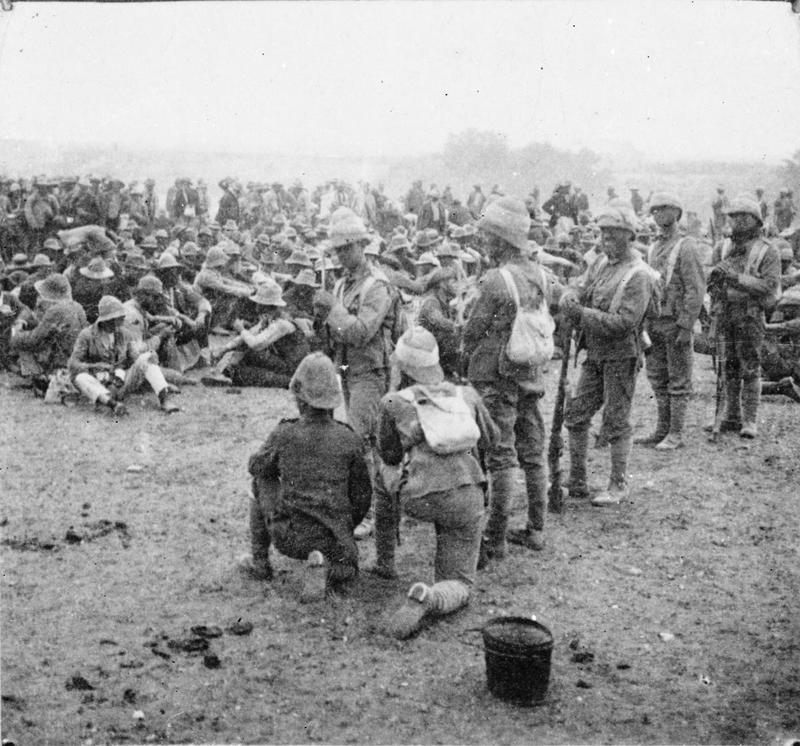
British infantry during the Second Boer War

1st Division

1st Infantry Brigade

- 3rd Battalion, Grenadier Guards
- 1st Battalion, Coldstream Guards
- 2nd battalion, Coldstream Guards
- 1st Battalion, Scots Guards
- No. 1 Bearer Company
- No. 1 Field Hospital

2nd Infantry Brigade

- 2nd Battalion, Royal West Surrey Regiment
- 2nd Battalion, Devonshire Regiment
- 2nd Battalion, West Yorkshire Regiment
- 2nd Battalion, East Surrey Regiment
- No. 4 Bearer Company
- No. 3 Field Hospital

Divisional Troops

- Divisional artillery, Royal Field Artillery
  - 7th Battery
  - 14th Battery
  - 66th Battery
  - Ammunition column
- Divisional engineers, Royal Engineers
- No. 7 Field Hospital
- A Squadron, 1st Life Guards

=== Belmont to Magersfontein (November–December 1899) ===
1st Division

1st (Guards) Brigade

- 3rd Battalion, Grenadier Guards
- 1st Battalion, Coldstream Guards
- 2nd battalion, Coldstream Guards
- 1st Battalion, Scots Guards

9th Infantry Brigade

- 1st Battalion, Northumberland Fusiliers
- 1st Battalion, Loyal North Lancashire Regiment (only half the battalion was present, the remainder formed part of the Kimberley garrison)
- 2nd Battalion, Northamptonshire Regiment
- 2nd Battalion, King's Own Yorkshire Light Infantry
- No. 1 Field Hospital

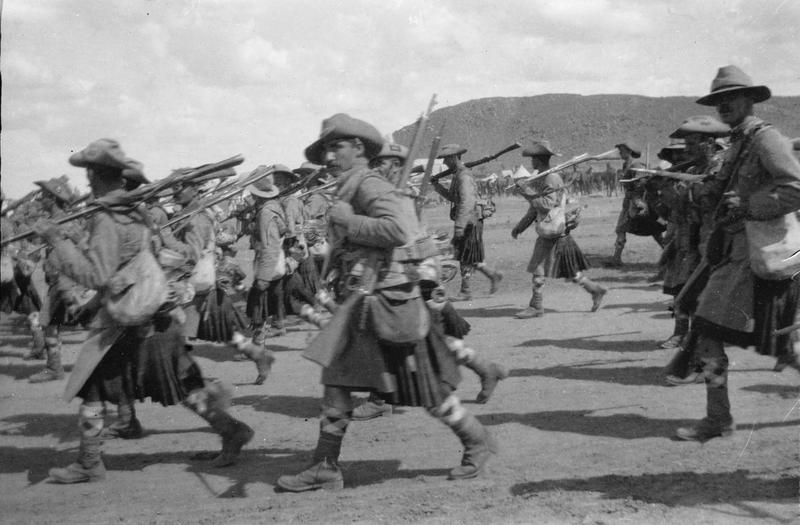
The Argyll and Sutherland Highlanders, during the Second Boer War

3rd (Highland) Brigade (arrived by 10 December for Magersfontein)

- 2nd Battalion, Royal Highlanders (Black Watch)
- 2nd Battalion, Seaforth Highlanders
- 1st Battalion, Highland Light Infantry
- 1st Battalion, Argyll and Sutherland Highlanders
- No. 2 Field Hospital
- 'A' Bearer Company

Divisional Mounted Troops

- 9th Lancers
- 12th Lancers (arrived by 10 December for Magersfontein)
- One company of mounted infantry, Northumberland Fusiliers
- One company of mounted infantry, Loyal North Lancashire Regiment
- Half a company of mounted infantry, King's Own Yorkshire Light Infantry
- Detachment from the New South Wales Lancers
- Rimington's Guides

Divisional Troops

- Divisional artillery, Royal Field Artillery
  - 18th Battery
  - 75th Battery
  - 62nd Battery (arrived in time for Modder River)
  - 65th (Howitzer) Battery (arrived by 10 December for Magersfontein)
- G Battery, Royal Horse Artillery (arrived by 10 December for Magersfontein)
- Divisional engineers, Royal Engineers
  - 7th Field Company
  - 8th Railway Company
  - 11th Field Company
  - 30th Fortress Company
  - Telegraph section
- No. 3 Field Hospital
- Naval Brigade
- 1st Battalion, Gordon Highlanders (arrived by 10 December for Magersfontein)

=== Based out of Kimberley (late February–May 1900) ===
1st Division (Note: Sources outside of the official history provide different orders of battle for this period. Louis Creswicke, who wrote about the campaign, stated the order of battle for when the division was based out of Kimberley as follows: 9th Brigade: 1st Northumberland Fusiliers, 1st Loyal North Lancashire, 2nd Northamptonshire, 2nd Yorkshire Light Infantry 20th Brigade: Composed of Militia Battalions Imperial Yeomanry brigade: 1st, 3rd, 5th, and 10th Battalions; Cape Police; Diamond Fields Horse; and elements of the Kimberley Light Horse Divisional artillery: 4th, 20th, and 44th Field Batteries and the 37th Howitzer Battery. Leo Amery, in The Times History of the War in South Africa 1899–1902, provided the following order of battle: 9th Brigade: 1st Northumberland Fusiliers, 1st Loyal North Lancashire Regiment, 3rd South Wales Borderers, 2nd Northamptonshire Regiment 20th Brigade: 1st Royal Munster Fusiliers, 2nd Yorkshire Light Infantry, 4th Scottish Rifles, 4th South Staffordshire Regiment Imperial Yeomanry brigade: 3rd, 5th, 10th, and 15th Battalions, and Warwick's Scouts Divisional artillery: 4th, 20th, and 38th Field Batteries, Royal Field Artillery; 37th Howitzer Battery, Royal Field Artillery; 'H' Section, pom-poms; Diamond Fields Artillery; 23rd Company, Royal Garrison Artillery Divisional troops: 11th Company, Royal Engineers)

9th Brigade

- 1st Battalion, Northumberland Fusiliers
- 1st Battalion, Loyal North Lancashire Regiment
- 3rd Battalion, South Wales Borderers
- 4th Battalion, Cameronians (Scottish Rifles)
- Detachment from the Army Service Corps
- No. 1 Bearer Company
- No. 19 Field Hospital

20th Brigade

- 2nd Battalion, Northamptonshire Regiment
- 2nd Battalion, King's Own Yorkshire Light Infantry
- 1st Battalion, Royal Munster Fusiliers
- 4th Battalion, South Staffordshire Regiment
- Detachment from the Army Service Corps
- Ad hoc bearer company
- No. 8 Field Hospital

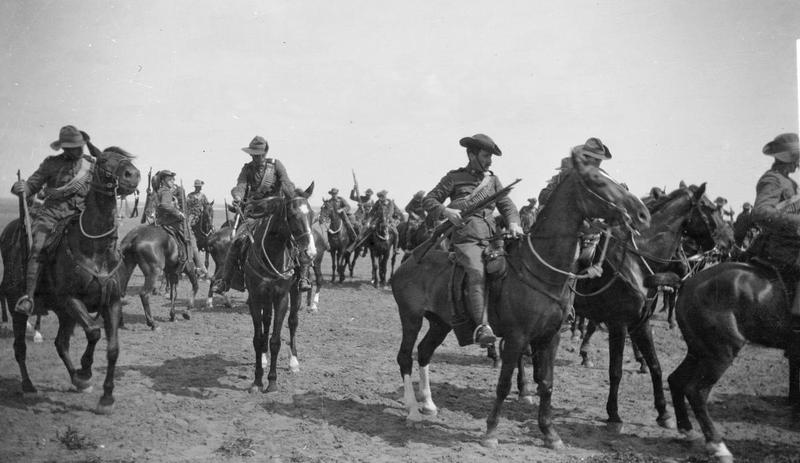
An example of the Imperial Yeomanry

Imperial Yeomanry brigade

- 3rd Battalion
- 5th Battalion
- 10th Battalion
- Kimberley Mounted Corps

Divisional Troops

- Divisional artillery, Royal Field Artillery
  - 4th Battery
  - 20th Battery
  - 38th Battery
  - 37th Howitzer Battery
  - Diamond Fields Artillery

=== June 1900 onwards ===
1st Division (Methuen's Column)

- 1st Battalion, Northumberland Fusiliers
- 2nd Northamptonshire Regiment
- 1st Loyal North Lancashire Regiment
- Imperial Yeomanry
  - 5th Battalion
  - 10th Battalion
  - 15th Battalion
- Detachment of mounted infantry
- Detachment of Warwick's Scouts
- Divisional artillery, Royal Field Artillery
  - 4th Battery
  - 20th Battery
  - 38th Battery
- Three sections, 11th Field Company, Royal Engineers

== First World War ==
On 28 July 1914, the First World War began. On 4 August, Germany invaded Belgium and the United Kingdom entered the war against the German Empire. The division soon deployed to France, as part of the British Expeditionary Force, and it then served on the Western Front between 1914 and 1918.

The war establishment (on-paper strength), of an infantry division in 1914 was 18,179 men, 5,594 horses, 18 motor vehicles, 76 pieces of artillery, and 24 machine guns. While there was a small alteration to the number of men and horses were supposed to be in a division in 1915, the main change was the decrease in artillery pieces to 48 and an increase in motor vehicles to 54. The establishment in 1916 increased the division size to 19,372 men, 5,145 horses, 61 motor vehicles, 64 artillery pieces, 40 trench mortars, and 200 machine guns. The 1917 changes saw a decrease to 18,825 men, 4,342 horses, 57 motor vehicles, and 48 artillery pieces, although the number of trench mortars remained the same, and the number of machine guns increased to 264. By 1918, the number of front line infantry within the British Army in France had decreased because of casualties and a lack of eligible replacements, and this led to a manpower crisis. To consolidate manpower and to increase the ratio of machine guns and artillery support available to the infantry, the number of battalions in a division was reduced from twelve to nine. This resulted in the 1918 establishment of 16,035 men, 3,838 horses, 79 motor vehicles, 48 artillery pieces, 36 trench mortars, and 400 machine guns.

=== First World War (1914–1918) ===
1st Division

1st (Guards) Brigade (on 23 August 1915, brigade was renamed 1st Brigade):

- 1st Battalion, Coldstream Guards (until 23 August 1915)
- 1st Battalion, Scots Guards (until 23 August 1915)
- 1st Battalion, Black Watch
- 2nd Battalion, Royal Munster Fusiliers (until 4 September 1914)
- 1st Battalion, Queen's Own Cameron Highlanders (from 5 September 1914)
- 14th (County of London) Battalion, London Regiment (London Scottish) (from 7 November 1914, until 8 February 1916)
- 8th Battalion, Royal Berkshire Regiment (from 16 August 1915, until 2 February 1918)
- 10th Battalion, Gloucestershire Regiment (from 17 August 1915, until 19 February 1918)
- 1st Trench Mortar Battery (joined late November 1915)
- 1st Brigade Machine Gun Company, Machine Gun Corps (from 26 January 1916)
- 1st Battalion, Loyal Regiment (North Lancashire) (from 7 February 1918)

2nd Brigade:

- 2nd Battalion, Royal Sussex Regiment
- 1st Battalion, Loyal Regiment (North Lancashire) (until 7 February 1918)
- 1st Battalion, Northamptonshire Regiment
- 2nd Battalion, King's Royal Rifle Corps
- 1/5th (Cinque Ports) Battalion, Royal Sussex Regiment (from 21 February until 20 August 1915)
- 1/9th Battalion, King's Regiment (Liverpool) (from 29 March until 12 November 1915)
- 1/5th Battalion, King's Own Royal Regiment (Lancaster) (from 21 October 1915 until 7 January 1916)
- 2nd Trench Mortar Battery (joined late November 1915)
- 2nd Brigade Machine Gun Company, Machine Gun Corps (from 26 January 1916)

3rd Brigade:

- 1st Battalion, Queen's Royal Regiment (West Surrey) (until 8 November 1914)
- 1st Battalion, South Wales Borderers
- 1st Battalion, Gloucestershire Regiment
- 2nd Battalion, Welch Regiment
- 2nd Battalion, Royal Munster Fusiliers (from 9 November 1914 until early February 1918)
- 1/4th (Denbighshire) Battalion, Royal Welch Fusiliers (from 7 December 1914 until 1September 1915)
- 1/6th (Glamorgan) Battalion, Welsh Regiment (from 23 October 1915 until 15 May 1916)
- 3rd Trench Mortar Battery (joined late November 1915)
- 3rd Brigade Machine Gun Company, Machine Gun Corps (from 26 January 1916)

Divisional Mounted Troops:

- C Squadron, 15th The King's Hussars (until 13 May 1915)
- B Squadron, Northumberland Hussars (from 13 May 1915, until 18 April 1916)
- 1st Cyclist Company (until 15 June 1916)

Divisional Artillery:

- XXV Brigade, Royal Field Artillery (until 25 January 1917)
  - 113th Battery (until 4 February 1915)
  - 114th Battery
  - 115th Battery
  - D (Howitzer) Battery (1 section each from 30th and 40th (Howitzer) Batteries, from 22 May 1916)
  - XXXV Brigade, Brigade Ammunition Column
- XXVI Brigade, Royal Field Artillery (until 14 January 1917)
  - 116th Battery
  - 117th Battery
  - 118th Battery (until 4 February 1915)
  - 40th (Howitzer) Battery (from 22 May 1916)
  - XXXVI Brigade, Brigade Ammunition Column
- XXXIX Brigade, Royal Field Artillery
  - 46th Battery
  - 51st Battery
  - 54th Battery
  - 30th (Howitzer) Battery (from 22 May 1916)
  - XXXIX Brigade, Brigade Ammunition Column
- XLIII (Howitzer) Brigade (broken up on 22 May 1916)
  - 30th (Howitzer) Battery
  - 40th (Howitzer) Battery
  - 57th (Howitzer) Battery (until 23 June 1915)
  - XLIII (Howitzer) Brigade, Brigade Ammunition Column
- 26th Heavy Battery, Royal Garrison Artillery (until April 1915)
  - 26th Heavy Battery Ammunition Column
- X.1 Medium Trench Mortar Battery, Royal Field Artillery (formed during April 1916)
- Y.1 Medium Trench Mortar Battery, Royal Field Artillery (formed during April 1916)
- Z.1 Medium Trench Mortar Battery, Royal Field Artillery (formed during April 1916, until 9 February 1918 when distributed between X and Y batteries)
- V.1 Heavy Trench Mortar Battery, Royal Garrison Artillery (formed 13 January 1917, until 3 January 1918)
- 1st Divisional Ammunition Column (absorbed brigade ammunition columns from 22 May 1916)

Divisional Engineers, Royal Engineers:

- 23rd Field Company
- 26th Field Company
- 1st (Lowland) Field Company (from 28 December 1914, later renumbered as 409th (Lowland) Field Company)
- 1st Divisional Signal Company

Divisional Pioneers:

- 1/6th (Glamorgan) Battalion, Welsh Regiment (from 15 May 1916)

Divisional Machine Guns:

- 216th Machine Gun Company (formed on 22 March 1918)
- No. 1 Battalion, Machine Gun Corps (formed on 28 February 1918, and assumed control of brigade machine gun companies)
  - 1st Machine Gun Company
  - 2nd Machine Gun Company
  - 3rd Machine Gun Company
  - 216th Machine Gun Company

Divisional Medical Services, Royal Army Medical Corps:

- 1st Field Ambulance
- 2nd Field Ambulance
- 3rd Field Ambulance (until 24 August 1915)
- 141st Field Ambulance (from 24 August 1915)

Divisional Veterinary Services, Army Veterinary Corps:

- 2nd Mobile Veterinary Section

Divisional Services, Army Service Corps:

- 1st Divisional Train
  - 7th Company
  - 13th Company
  - 16th Company
  - 36th Company
  - 8th Company (from 19 August 1915, until 25 November 1915)
  - 172nd Company (from 25 November 1915)
- 204th Divisional Employment Company (from 19 May 1917 as 6th Divisional Employment Company and renumbered on 14 June 1917)

== Second World War ==
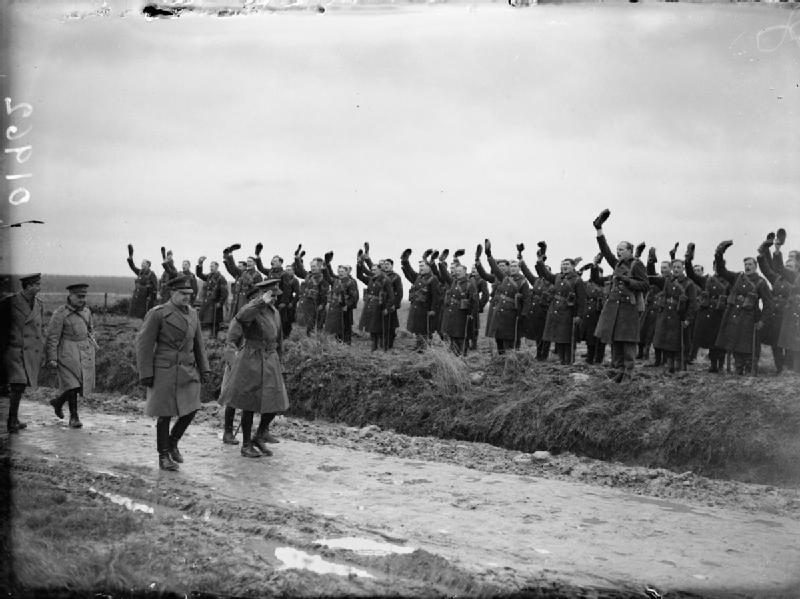
Major-General Harold Alexander and King George VI inspect the 2nd Battalion, Hampshire Regiment, in France, 1939.

In 1939, following the German invasion of Poland, the United Kingdom declared war in support of the latter and entered the Second World War. The division, now styled as an infantry division, saw combat in France in 1940. After the British Army's defeat, the division returned to—and defended—the UK. Between June and November 1942, it was reorganised as a "mixed division", which saw an infantry brigade removed replaced by a brigade of tanks. Afterwards, it reverted to an infantry division and was deployed to fight in the Tunisian campaign in 1943. It then seized the island of Pantelleria and subsequently fought in the Italian campaign until January 1945. Afterwards, it was withdrawn to Palestine, where it spent the remainder of the war.

The war establishment of the infantry division in 1939 was 13,863 men, 2,993 vehicles, 72 artillery pieces, 48 anti-tank guns, 361 anti-tank rifles, 126 mortars, and 700 machine guns. In 1941, it was changed to 17,298 men, 4,166 vehicles, 72 artillery pieces, 48 anti-tanks guns, 444 anti-tank rifles, 48 anti-aircraft guns, 218 mortars, and 867 machine guns. From 1944, the establishment was updated to 18,347 men, 4,330 vehicles, 72 artillery pieces, 110 anti-tank guns, 436 other anti-tank weapons, 359 mortars, and 1,302 machine guns.

=== September 1939–May 1942 ===
1st Infantry Division

1st Infantry Brigade (Guards) (until 1 June 1941)

- 3rd Battalion, Grenadier Guards (until 26 May 1940, then from 4 June 1940)
- 2nd Battalion, Coldstream Guards
- 2nd Battalion, Hampshire Regiment
- Brigade Anti-tank Company (until 31 December 1940)

2nd Infantry Brigade

- 1st Battalion, Loyal Regiment (North Lancashire)
- 2nd Battalion, North Staffordshire Regiment
- 1st Battalion, Gordon Highlanders (until 8 March 1940)
- Brigade Anti-tank Company (until 28 December 1940)
- 6th Battalion, Gordon Highlanders (from 7 March 1940)

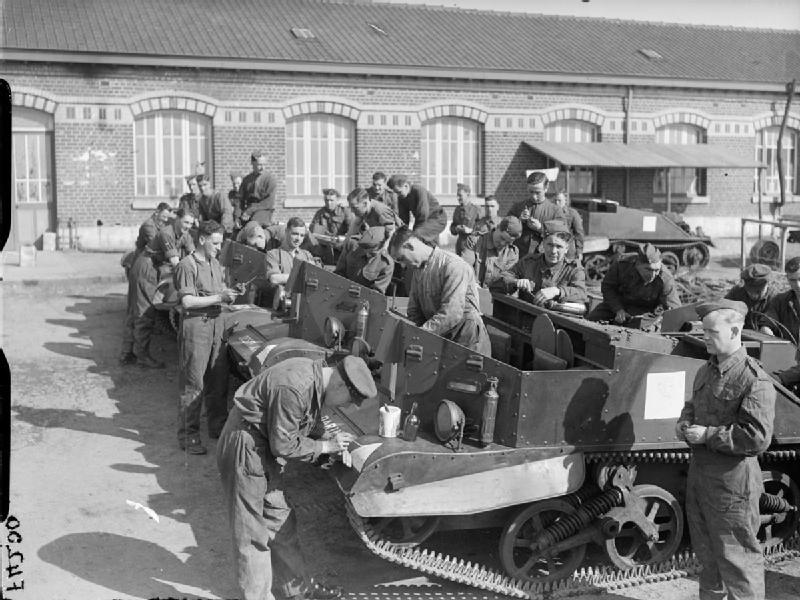
Men of the 1st Battalion, Duke of Wellington's Regiment, France, 2 May 1940; some of the men are painting the divisional white triangle on their Universal Carriers

3rd Infantry Brigade

- 1st Battalion, Duke of Wellington's Regiment
- 2nd Battalion, Sherwood Foresters
- 1st Battalion, King's Shropshire Light Infantry
- Brigade Anti-tank Company (until 31 December 1940)

210th Infantry Brigade (from 25 November 1941, renamed 38th (Irish) Infantry Brigade on 13 January 1942)

- 2nd Battalion, London Irish Rifles (from 30 November 1941)
- 1st Battalion, Royal Irish Fusiliers (from 12 December 1941)
- 6th Battalion, Royal Inniskilling Fusiliers (from 15 January 1942)

Divisional Troops:

- Divisional artillery, Royal Artillery
  - 2nd Field Regiment
  - 19th Field Regiment
  - 24th Field Regiment (until 31 January 1940)
  - 67th (South Midland) Field Regiment (from 31 January 1940)
  - 21st Anti-Tank Regiment (until 10 October 1941)
  - 81st Anti-Tank Regiment (from 5 November 1941)
  - 90th Light Anti-Aircraft Regiment (from 27 January 1942)
- Divisional engineers, Royal Engineers
  - 17th Field Company (until 2 November 1939)
  - 23rd Field Company
  - 26th Field Company (until 28 February 1940)
  - 248th Field Company
  - 238th Field Company (from 29 February 1940)
  - 6th Field Park Company
- Divisional Signals, Royal Corps of Signals
- Divisional reconnaissance
  - 13th/18th Royal Hussars (until 31 March 1940)
  - 1st Reconnaissance Battalion, Reconnaissance Corps (from 8 January 1941)
- 4th Battalion, Cheshire Regiment (machine gun battalion, from 11 November 1941)

=== Mixed Division (June–November 1942) ===
1st Mixed Division

2nd Infantry Brigade

- 1st Battalion, Loyal Regiment (North Lancashire)
- 2nd Battalion, North Staffordshire Regiment
- 6th Battalion, Gordon Highlanders

3rd Infantry Brigade

- 1st Battalion, Duke of Wellington's Regiment
- 2nd Battalion, Sherwood Foresters
- 1st Battalion, King's Shropshire Light Infantry

34th Tank Brigade (until 2 September)

- North Irish Horse
- 147th Regiment Royal Armoured Corps
- 153rd Regiment Royal Armoured Corps

25th Tank Brigade (from 3 September)

- 51st (Leeds Rifles) Royal Tank Regiment
- 142nd Regiment Royal Armoured Corps
- North Irish Horse

Divisional Troops:

- Divisional artillery, Royal Artillery
  - 2nd Field Regiment
  - 19th Field Regiment
  - 67th Field Regiment
  - 81st Anti-Tank Regiment
  - 90th Light Anti-Aircraft Regiment
- Divisional engineers, Royal Engineers
  - 23rd Field Company
  - 238th Field Company
  - 248th Field Company
  - 6th Field Park Company
- Divisional Signals, Royal Corps of Signals
- Divisional reconnaissance
  - 1st Reconnaissance Regiment, Reconnaissance Corps
- 4th Battalion, Cheshire Regiment (machine gun battalion, until 1 October)

=== December 1942–End of war ===
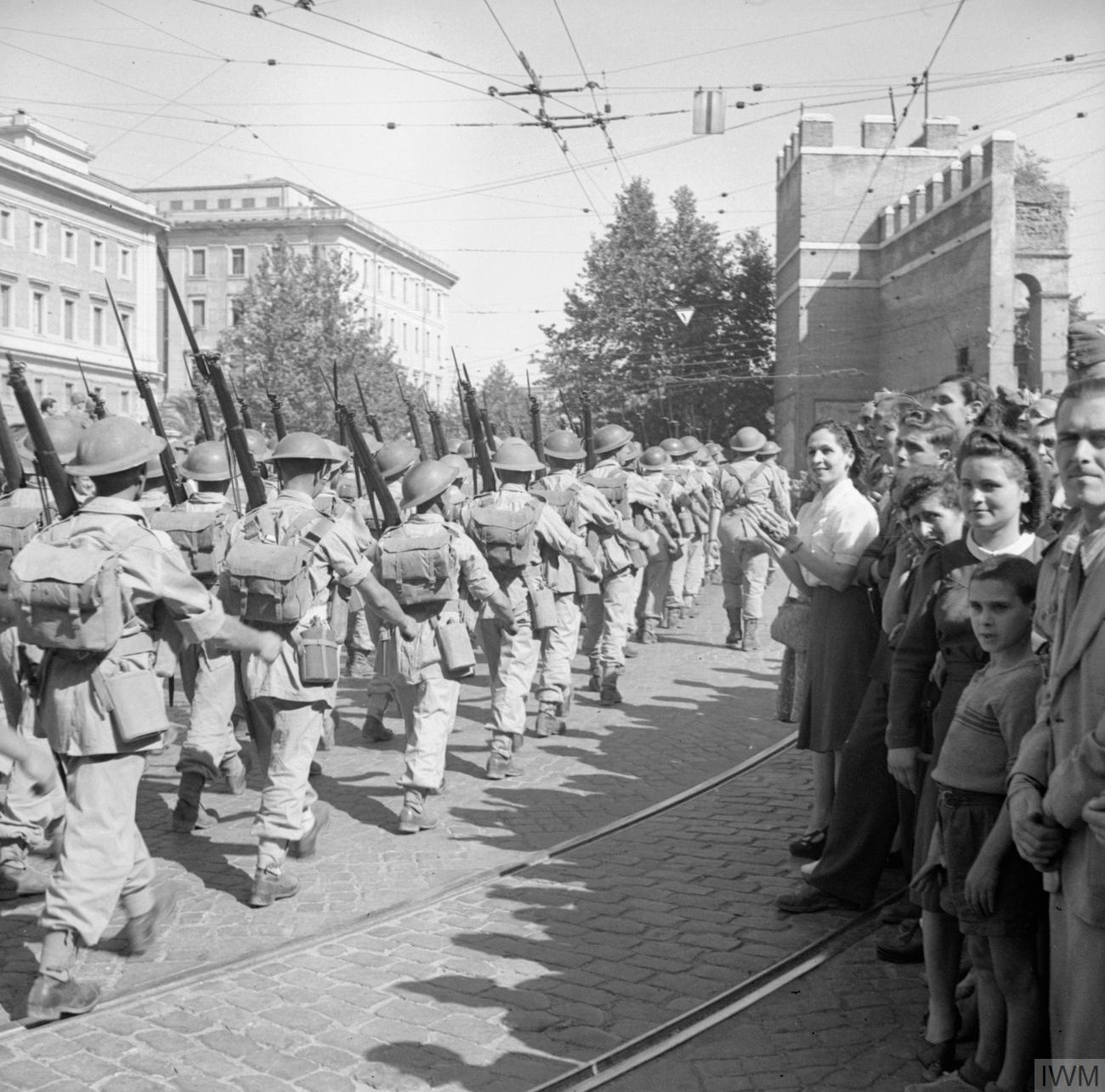
Men of the 1st Battalion, Duke of Wellington's Regiment, march into Rome, 8 June 1944

1st Infantry Division

2nd Infantry Brigade

- 1st Battalion, Loyal Regiment (North Lancashire)
- 2nd Battalion, North Staffordshire Regiment
- 6th Battalion, Gordon Highlanders

3rd Infantry Brigade

- 1st Battalion, Duke of Wellington's Regiment
- 2nd Battalion, Sherwood Foresters
- 1st Battalion, King's Shropshire Light Infantry

24th Infantry Brigade (Guards) (until 7 March 1944)

- 1st Battalion, Scots Guards
- 1st Battalion, Irish Guards
- 5th Battalion, Grenadier Guards

18th Infantry Brigade (from 8 March until 16 August 1944)

- 9th Battalion, King's Own Yorkshire Light Infantry
- 1st Battalion, Buffs (Royal East Kent Regiment)
- 14th Battalion, Sherwood Foresters

66th Infantry Brigade (from 19 August 1944)

- 2nd Battalion, Royal Scots
- 1st Battalion, Hertfordshire Regiment
- 11th Battalion, Lancashire Fusiliers

Divisional Troops:

- Divisional artillery, Royal Artillery
  - 2nd Field Regiment
  - 19th Field Regiment
  - 67th Field Regiment
  - 81st Anti-Tank Regiment (until 8 April 1945)
  - 93rd Anti-Tank Regiment (from 9 April 1945)
  - 90th Light Anti-Aircraft Regiment (until 7 November 1944)
  - 11th Light Anti-Aircraft Regiment (from 19 November 1944 until 17 January 1945)
  - 1st Light Anti-Aircraft Regiment (from 22 March 1945)
- Divisional engineers, Royal Engineers
  - 23rd Field Company
  - 238th Field Company
  - 248th Field Company
  - 6th Field Park Company
  - 1st Bridging Platoon (from 18 October 1943)
- Divisional Signals, Royal Corps of Signals
- Divisional reconnaissance
  - 1st Reconnaissance Regiment, Reconnaissance Corps (until 31 December 1943)
  - 1st Reconnaissance Regiment, Royal Armoured Corps (from 1 January 1944)
- 2/7th Battalion, Middlesex Regiment (support battalion from 17 August 1943 until 27 May 1944, then machine gun battalion until the end of the war)

== See also ==
- NORTHAG wartime structure in 1989
- Order of battle of the Gulf War ground campaign
- Operation Granby order of battle
- Operation Telic order of battle
