= List of Victoria Cross recipients from the British 3rd Division =

British military decoration recipients

The Victoria Cross (VC) is a military decoration awarded for valour "in the face of the enemy" to members of armed forces of some Commonwealth countries and previous British Empire territories. The VC was introduced, in Great Britain, on 29 January 1856 by Queen Victoria to reward acts of valour during the Crimean War. It takes precedence over all other orders, decorations and medals. It may be awarded to a person of any rank in any service, and to civilians under military command. All those who earn the VC have their names published in The London Gazette.

* indicates a posthumous award

Name	Unit	Campaign	Date of action	Place of action
Thomas Grady	4th Regiment of Foot	Crimean War	18 October 1854	Sevastopol, Crimea
William McWheeney	44th Regiment of Foot	Crimean War	20 October 1854	Sevastopol, Crimea
William Nickerson	Royal Army Medical Corps	Second Boer War	20 April 1900	Wakkerstroom, South Africa
Harry Beet	Derbyshire Regiment	Second Boer War	22 April 1900	Wakkerstroom, South Africa
Maurice Dease	Royal Fusiliers	First World War	23 August 1914*	Mons, Belgium
Sidney Godley	Royal Fusiliers	First World War	23 August 1914	Mons, Belgium
Charles Jarvis	Corps of Royal Engineers	First World War	23 August 1914	Jemappes, Belgium
Theodore Wright	Corps of Royal Engineers	First World War	23 August 1914; 14 September 1914*	Mons, Belgium
Charles Garforth	15th The King's Hussars	First World War	23 August 1914	Harmingnies, France
Cyril Martin	Corps of Royal Engineers	First World War	12 March 1915	Spanbroek Molen, Belgium
Edward Mellish	Royal Army Chaplains' Department	First World War	27–29 March 1916	St. Eloi, Belgium
Billy Congreve	Prince Consort's Own (Rifle Brigade)	First World War	6–20 July 1916	Longueval, France
Sidney Bates	Royal Norfolk Regiment	Second World War	6 August 1944*^{[C]}	Sourdeval, France
James Stokes	King's Shropshire Light Infantry	Second World War	1 March 1945*	Kervenheim, Germany
Johnson Beharry	Princess of Wales's Royal Regiment	Iraq War	1 May 2004; 11 June 2004	Al-Amarah, Iraq
James Ashworth	Grenadier Guards	War in Afghanistan	13 June 2012*	Nahr-e Saraj District, Afghanistan

== See also ==
- List of Victoria Cross recipients from the British 1st Division
- List of Victoria Cross recipients from the British 2nd Division
