= 26th Brigade Royal Field Artillery =

XXVI Brigade, Royal Field Artillery was a brigade (Note: The basic organic unit of the Royal Artillery was, and is, the Battery. When grouped together they formed brigades, in the same way that infantry battalions or cavalry regiments were grouped together in brigades. At the outbreak of World War I, a field artillery brigade of headquarters (4 officers, 37 other ranks), three batteries (5 and 193 each), and a brigade ammunition column (4 and 154) had a total strength just under 800 so was broadly comparable to an infantry battalion (just over 1,000) or a cavalry regiment (about 550). Like an infantry battalion, an artillery brigade was usually commanded by a Lieutenant-Colonel. Artillery brigades were redesignated as regiments in 1938.) of the Royal Field Artillery which served in the First World War.

It was originally formed with 116th, 117th and 118th Batteries, and attached to 1st Division. In August 1914, it mobilised and was sent to the Continent with the British Expeditionary Force, where it saw service with 1st Division until January 1917. 118th Battery left the brigade in May 1915, and 40th (Howitzer) Battery joined in May 1916. From January 1917 onwards, it was used as an army-level brigade.
