= List of Victoria Cross recipients from the British 1st Division =

British military decoration recipients

The Victoria Cross (VC) is a military decoration awarded for valour "in the face of the enemy" to members of armed forces of some Commonwealth countries and previous British Empire territories. The VC was introduced, in Great Britain, on 29 January 1856 by Queen Victoria to reward acts of valour during the Crimean War. It takes precedence over all other orders, decorations and medals. It may be awarded to a person of any rank in any service, and to civilians under military command. All those who earn the VC have their names published in The London Gazette.

Date of action	Rank	Name	Unit	Place of action	Country of action	Sources +Recipients
31 May/1 June 1940	Lieutenant (Acting Captain)	Marcus Ervine-Andrews	East Lancashire Regiment	Canal de Bergues	France	
22–27 April 1943	Lieutenant (Temporary Captain)	Charles Lyell	Scots Guards	Djebel bou Aoukaz	Tunisia	
23 April 1943	Lieutenant	Willward Sandys-Clarke	Loyal Regiment (North Lancashire)	Guiriat El Atach	Tunisia	
27–30 April 1943	Lance-corporal	John Kenneally	Irish Guards	Djebel bou Aoukaz	Tunisia	
6–10 February 1944	Captain (Temporary Major)	William Sidney	Grenadier Guards	Carroceto	Italy	
8 October 1944	Private	Richard Burton	Duke of Wellington's (West Riding) Regiment	Monte Ceco	Italy	

== See also ==
- List of Victoria Cross recipients from the British 2nd Division
