= First Battle of Ypres order of battle =

1914 battle in West Flanders, Belgium

This is the order of battle for the First Battle of Ypres fought from 19 October to 22 November 1914 as one of the main engagements of the First World War. It was fought between mixed British Expeditionary Force, French eighth army and armies of the German Empire in northern France and Flanders.

== British Expeditionary Force (John French) ==
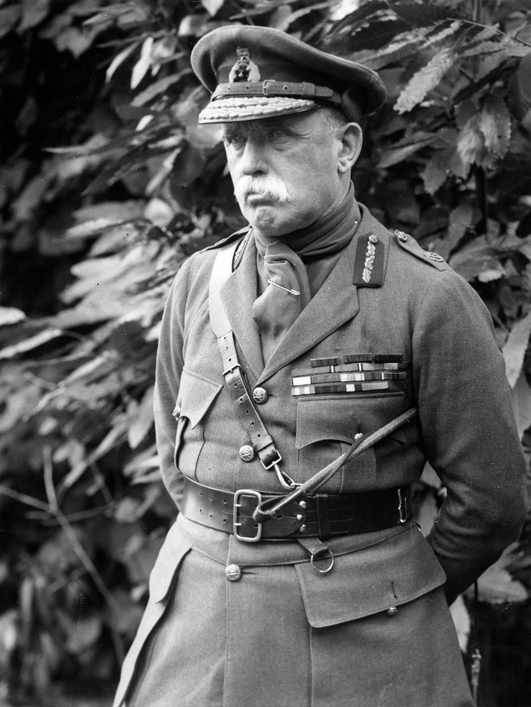
British commander John French

=== I Corps (Douglas Haig) ===
1st Division (Samuel Lomax)

1st (Guards) Brigade

1st Coldstream Guards
1st Scots Guards
1st Black Watch
1st Queens Own Cameron Highlanders
London Scottish Regiment

2nd Brigade

2nd Royal Sussex Regiment
1st Loyal North Lancashire Regiment
1st Northamptonshire Regiment
2nd Kings Royal Rifle Corps

3rd Brigade

1st Queen's Royal West Surrey Regiment
1st South Wales Borderers
1st Gloucestershire Regiment
2nd Welsh Regiment

XXV Brigade, Royal Field Artillery

113th Battery
114th Battery
115th Battery

XXVI Brigade, Royal Field Artillery

116th Battery
117th Battery
118th Battery

XXXIX Brigade, Royal Field Artillery

46th Battery
51st Battery
54th Battery

XLIII (Howitzer) Brigade, Royal Field Artillery

30th (H) Battery
40th (H) Battery
57th (H) Battery

26th Heavy Battery Royal Garrison Artillery

Mounted Troops

"A" Squadron 15th Hussars
1st Cyclist company

Engineers

23rd Field company Royal Engineers
26th Field company Royal Engineers

2nd Division (Charles Monro)

4th (Guards) Brigade

2nd Grenadier Guards
2nd Coldstream Guards
3rd Coldstream Guards
1st Irish Guards
1st Hertfordshire Regiment

5th Brigade

2nd Worcestershire Regiment
2nd Oxfordshire and Buckinghamshire Light Infantry
2nd Highland Light Infantry
2nd Connaught Rangers

6th Brigade

1st King's Regiment (Liverpool)
2nd South Staffordshire Regiment
1st Royal Berkshire Regiment
1st Kings Royal Rifle Corps

XXXIV Brigade, Royal Field Artillery

22nd Battery
50th Battery
70th Battery

XXXVI Brigade, Royal Field Artillery

15th Battery
48th Battery
71st Battery

XLI Brigade, Royal Field Artillery

9th Battery
16th Battery
17th Battery

XLIV (Howitzer) Brigade, Royal Field Artillery

47th (H) Battery
56th (H) Battery
60th (H) Battery

35th Heavy Battery Royal Garrison Artillery

Mounted Troops

"B" Squadron 15th Hussars
2nd Cyclist company

Engineers

5th Field company Royal Engineers
11th Field company Royal Engineers

=== II Corps (Horace Smith-Dorrien) ===
3rd Division (Aylmer Haldane)

7th Infantry Brigade

3rd Worcestershire
2nd South Lancashire
1st Wiltshire(Duke of Edinburgh’s)
2nd Royal Irish Rifles

8th Infantry Brigade

2nd Royal Scots
2nd Royal Irish
4th Middlesex(Duke of Cambridge’s Own)
1st Devonshire
1st Honourable Artillery Company

9th Infantry Brigade

1st Northumberland Fusiliers
4th Royal Fusiliers
1st Lincolnshire
1st Royal Scots Fusiliers

XXIII Brigade, Royal Field Artillery

107th Battery
108th Battery
109th Battery

XL Brigade, Royal Field Artillery

6th Battery
23rd Battery
49th Battery

XLII Brigade, Royal Field Artillery

29th Battery
41st Battery
45th Battery

XXX (Howitzer) Brigade, Royal Field Artillery

128th (H) Battery
129th (H) Battery
130th (H) Battery

48th Heavy Battery Royal Garrison Artillery

Mounted Troops

"C" Squadron 15th Hussars
3rd Cyclist company

Engineers

56th Field company Royal Engineers
57th Field company Royal Engineers

5th Division (Charles Fergusson)

13th Infantry Brigade

2nd Kings Own Scottish Borderers
2nd Duke of Wellington's Regiment (West Riding)
1st Royal West Kent
2nd The King's Own Yorkshire Light Infantry

14th Infantry Brigade

2nd Suffolk
1st East Surrey
1st Duke of Cornwall’s Light Infantry
2nd Manchester

15th Infantry Brigade

1st Norfolk
1st Bedfordshire
1st Cheshire
1st Dorsetshire

XV Brigade, Royal Field Artillery

11th Battery
52nd Battery
80th Battery

XXVII Brigade, Royal Field Artillery

119th Battery
120th Battery
121st Battery

XXVIII Brigade, Royal Field Artillery

122nd Battery
123rd Battery
124th Battery

VIII (Howitzer) Brigade, Royal Field Artillery

37th (H) Battery
61st (H) Battery
65th (H) Battery

108th Heavy Battery Royal Garrison Artillery

Mounted Troops

"A" Squadron 19th Hussars
5th Cyclist company

Engineers

17th Field company Royal Engineers
59th Field company Royal Engineers

=== III Corps (William Pulteney) ===
4th Division (Henry Wilson)

10th Brigade

1st Royal Warwickshire
2nd Seaforth Highlanders
1st Princess Victoria’s (Royal Irish Fusiliers)
2nd Royal Dublin Fusiliers

11th Brigade

1st Prince Albert (Somerset Light Infantry)
1st East Lancashire
1st Hampshire
1st The Rifle Brigade

12th Brigade

1st The King’s Own (Royal Lancaster)
2nd Lancashire Fusiliers
2nd Royal Inniskilling Fusiliers
2nd Sussex

XIV Brigade, Royal Field Artillery

39th Battery
68th Battery
88th Battery

XXIX Brigade, Royal Field Artillery

125th Battery
126th Battery
127th Battery

XXXII Brigade, Royal Field Artillery

27th Battery
134th Battery
135th Battery

XXXVII (Howitzer) Brigade, Royal Field Artillery

31st (H) Battery
35th (H) Battery
55th (H) Battery

31st Heavy Battery Royal Garrison Artillery

Mounted Troops

"A" Squadron 19th Hussars
4th Cyclist company

Engineers

7th Field company Royal Engineers
9th Field company Royal Engineers

6th Division (John Keir)

16th Brigade

1st Buffs (East Kent Regiment)
1st Leicestershire
1st King's (Shropshire Light Infantry)
2nd York and Lancaster

17th Brigade

1st Royal Fusiliers (City of London Regiment)
1st Prince of Wales's (North Staffordshire Regiment)
2nd Prince of Wales's Leinster (Royal Canadians)
3rd Rifle Brigade (The Prince Consort's Own)

18th Brigade

1st Prince of Wales's Own (West Yorkshire Regiment)
1st East Yorkshire
2nd Sherwood Foresters (Nottinghamshire and Derbyshire Regiment)
2nd Durham Light Infantry

19th Brigade

2nd Royal Welsh Fusiliers
2nd Queen's Own Cameron Highlanders
1st Middlesex
2nd Argyll and Sutherland Highlanders

II Brigade, Royal Field Artillery

21st Battery
42nd Battery
53rd Battery

XXIV Brigade, Royal Field Artillery

110th Battery
111th Battery
112th Battery

XXXVIII Brigade, Royal Field Artillery

24th Battery
34th Battery
72nd Battery

XII (Howitzer) Brigade, Royal Field Artillery

43rd (H) Battery
86th (H) Battery
87th (H) Battery

24th Heavy Battery Royal Garrison Artillery

Mounted Troops

"C" Squadron 19th Hussars
6th Cyclist company

Engineers

12th Field company Royal Engineers
38th Field company Royal Engineers

=== Royal Flying Corps (David Henderson) ===
HQ Wireless Unit
2nd Aeroplane Squadron
3rd Aeroplane Squadron
4th Aeroplane Squadron
5th Aeroplane Squadron
6th Aeroplane Squadron

=== Cavalry Corps (Edmund Allenby) ===
1st Cavalry Division (Beauvoir De Lisle)

1st Cavalry Brigade

2nd Dragoon Guards
5th Dragoon Guards
11th Hussars
1st Signal Troop

2nd Cavalry Brigade

4th Dragoon Guards
9th Lancers
18th Hussars
2nd Signal Troop

VII Brigade, Royal Horse Artillery

H Battery, RHA
I Battery, RHA

Cavalry Divisional Troops

1st Field Squadron Royal Engineers
1st Signal Squadron
1st Cavalry Division supply column
1st and 3rd Cavalry Field Ambulances

2nd Cavalry Division (Hubert Gough)

3rd Cavalry Brigade

4th Hussars
5th Lancers
16th Lancers
3rd Signal Troop

4th Cavalry Brigade

6th Dragoon Guards
3rd Hussars
Household Cavalry Composite Regiment
4th Signal Troop

5th Cavalry Brigade

2nd Dragoons
12th Lancers
20th Hussars
5th Signal Troop

III Brigade, Royal Horse Artillery

D Battery, RHA
E Battery, RHA
J Battery, RHA

Cavalry Divisional Troops

2nd Field Squadron Royal Engineers
2nd Signal Squadron
2nd Cavalry Division supply column
2nd, 4th and 5th Cavalry Field Ambulances

=== IV Corps (Henry Rawlinson) ===
7th Division (Thompson Capper)

20th Brigade

1st Grenadier Guards
2nd Scots Guards
2nd Border
2nd Gordon Highlanders

21st Brigade

2nd Bedfordshire
2nd Green Howards (Alexandra, Princess of Wales's Own Yorkshire Regiment)
2nd Royal Scots Fusiliers
2nd Wiltshire (Duke of Edinburgh's)

22nd Brigade

2nd Queen's (Royal West Surrey)
2nd Royal Warwickshire
1st Royal Welch Fusiliers
1st South Staffordshire

XIV Brigade, Royal Horse Artillery

C Battery, RHA
F Battery, RHA

XXII Brigade Royal Field Artillery

104th Battery
105th Battery
106th Battery

XXXV Brigade Royal Field Artillery

12th Battery
25th Battery
58th Battery

24th Heavy Brigade Royal Garrison Artillery

7th Divisional ammunition column

Mounted Troops

Northumberland Hussars
7th Cyclist company

Engineers

54th Field company Royal Engineers
55th Field company Royal Engineers

Divisional Troops

7th Signal company
7th divisional train
21st,22nd and 23rd Field Ambulances

3rd Cavalry Division (Julian Byng)

6th Cavalry Brigade

3rd (Prince of Wales's) Dragoon Guards
1st Royal Dragoons
10th Hussars

7th Cavalry Brigade

1st Life Guards
2nd Life Guards
Royal Horse Guards

XV Brigade, Royal Horse Artillery (later renumbered IV Brigade, RHA)

G Battery, RHA
K Battery, RHA

Cavalry Divisional Troops

3rd Field Squadron Royal Engineers
3rd Signal Squadron
33rd Cavalry Division supply column
6th and 7th Cavalry Field Ambulances

=== Indian Corps (James Willcocks) ===
Lahore Division (H.B.B. Watkis)

Ferozepore Brigade

1st Connaught Rangers
9th Bhopal Infantry
57th Wilde's Rifles
129th Duke of Connaught's Own Baluchis

Jullundur Brigade

1st Manchester
15th Ludhiana Sikhs
47th Sikhs
59th Scinde Rifles

Meerut Division (C.A. Anderson)

Dehra Dun Brigade

1st Seaforth Highlanders
6th Jat Light Infantry
2/2 King Edward VII's Own Gurkha Rifles (The Sirmoor Rifles)
1/9 Gurkha Rifles

Garwhal Brigade

2nd Leicestershire
1/39 Garhwal Rifles
2/39 Garhwal Rifles
2/3 Queen Alexandra's Own Gurkha Rifles

Bareilly Brigade

2nd Black Watch
41st Dogras
58th Vaughan's Rifles
2/8 Gurkha Rifles

IV Brigade Royal Field Artillery

7th Battery
14th Battery
66th Battery

IX Brigade Royal Field Artillery

19th Battery
20th Battery
28th Battery

XIII Brigade Royal Field Artillery

2nd Battery
8th Battery
44th Battery

110th Heavy Battery Royal Garrison Artillery

Meerut Divisional ammunition column

Mounted Troops

4th Cavalry(Lancers)

Engineers

3rd company 1st King George V's Own Bengal Sappers and Miners
4th company 1st King George V's Own Bengal Sappers and Miners

Divisional Troops

Meerut Signal company
107th Pioneers
Meerut divisional train
19th and 20th Field Ambulances
128th, 129th and 130th (Indian) Field Ambulances

=== Units at Antwerp ===
Royal Naval Division (Archibald Paris)

== French VIII Army (Victor d'Urbal) ==
=== IX Corps (Pierre Joseph Dubois) ===
17th Division (Guignabaudet)
18th Division (Lefevre)
6th Cavalry Division (Requichot)
7th Cavalry Division (Hely d'Oissel)

=== XVI Corps (Paul François Grossetti) ===
31st Division (Vidal)
32nd Division (Bouchez)
39th Division (Danant)
43rd Division (Lanquetot)

=== XXXII Corps (Georges Louis Humbert) ===
38th Division (Jean-Marie Brulard)
42nd Division (Denis Auguste Duchêne)
89th Territorial Division (Boucher)
4th Cavalry Division (Buyer)

=== XX Corps (Balfourier) ===
11th Division (Ferry)
26th Division (Hallouin)

=== II Cavalry Corps (Antoine de Mitry) ===
87th Territorial Division (Roy)
5th Cavalry Division (Allenou)
9th Cavalry Division (de L'espee)

=== I Cavalry Corps (Louis Conneau) ===
1st Cavalry Division (Olivier Mazel)
3rd Cavalry Division (Lastours)
10th Cavalry Division (Contades)

== German Fourth Army (Albrecht of Württemberg) ==
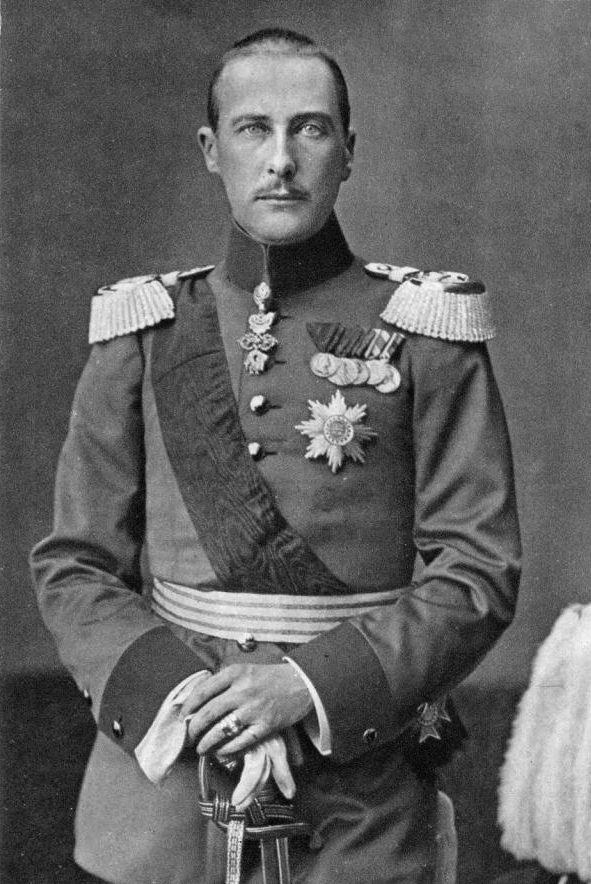
German commander Albrecht of Württemberg

Marine Division (Ludwig von Schröder)

=== III Reserve Corps (von Beseler) ===
Composite Cavalry Unit (3 squadrons each from 2nd Reserve Dragoon Regiment and 3rd Reserve Uhlan Regiment)

5th Reserve Division (Richard Voigt)

6 batteries, 6th Reserve Field Artillery Regiment

9th Reserve Infantry Brigade

8th Reserve Infantry Regiment
48th Reserve Infantry Regiment

10th Reserve Infantry Brigade

12th Reserve Infantry Regiment
52nd Reserve Infantry Regiment

6th Reserve Division (Emil von Schickfuß und Neudorf)

6 batteries, 6th Reserve Field Artillery Regiment

11th Reserve Infantry Brigade

20th Reserve Infantry Regiment
24th Reserve Infantry Regiment

12th Reserve Infantry Brigade

26th Reserve Infantry Regiment
35th Reserve Infantry Regiment

4th Ersatz Division (Albert von Werder)

=== XXII Reserve Corps (Eugen von Falkenhayn) ===
43rd Reserve Division (Karl Stenger)

44th Reserve Division (Eugen von Dorrer)

=== XXIII Reserve Corps (Georg von Kleist) ===
45th Reserve Division (Albert Schöpflin)

46th Reserve Division (Bruno Hahn)

=== XXVI Reserve Corps (Otto von Hügel) ===
51st Reserve Division (Ferdinand Waenker von Dankenschweil)

52nd Reserve Division (Emil Waldorf)

=== XXVII Reserve Corps (Adolph von Carlowitz) ===
53rd Reserve Division (Hans von Watzdorf)

54th Reserve Division (Paul von Schaefer)

=== Plettenberg's Corps (Karl von Plettenberg) ===
2nd Guards Division (Arnold von Winckler)

=== II Army Corps (Alexander von Linsingen) ===
30th Aviation Battalion
15th (Heavy) Foot Artillery Regiment

3rd Division (Ferdinand Karl von Trossel)

3rd Artillery Brigade

3rd Horse Grenadiers

5th Infantry Brigade

2nd Grenadier Regiment
9th Grenadier Regiment

6th Infantry Brigade

34th Fusilier Regiment
42nd Infantry Regiment

4th Division (Erich Freyer)

4th Artillery Brigade

12th Dragoons

7th Infantry Brigade

14th Infantry Regiment
149th Infantry Regiment

8th Infantry Brigade

49th Infantry Regiment
140th Infantry Regiment

=== XV Corps (Berthold von Deimling) ===
30th Division (Friedrich von Gontard)

39th Division (Hugo von Kathen)

== German Sixth Army (Rupprecht of Bavaria) ==
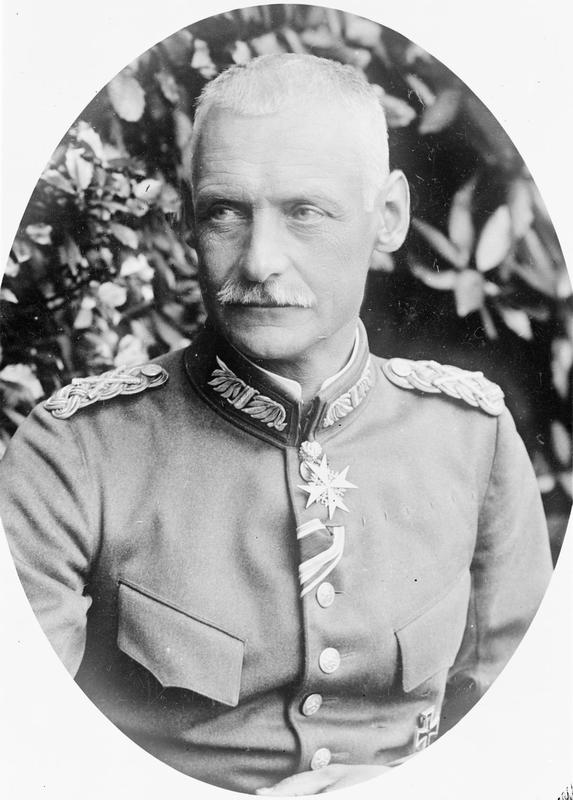
German commander Prince Rupprecht of Bavaria

=== II Royal Bavarian Corps (Karl von Martini) ===
3rd Bavarian Division (Otto Ritter von Breitkopf)

4th Bavarian Division (Ernst Ritter von Schrott)

6th Bavarian Reserve Division (Maximilian von Speidel)

=== XIII (Royal Württemberg) Corps (Max von Fabeck) ===
25th Reserve Division (Thaddäus von Jarotzky)

26th Division (Wilhelm von Urach)

=== I Cavalry Corps (Manfred von Richthofen) ===
Guard Cavalry Division (Günther von Etzel)

4th Cavalry Division (Otto von Garnier)

=== II Cavalry Corps (Georg von der Marwitz) ===
2nd Cavalry Division (Georg Thumb von Neuburg)

7th Cavalry Division (Ernst von Heydebreck)

=== IV Cavalry Corps (Gustav von Hollen) ===
3rd Cavalry Division (Kurt von Unger)

Bavarian Cavalry Division (Karl von Wenninger)

=== XIX (2nd Royal Saxon) Corps (Maximillian von Laffert) ===
24th Division (Hans Krug von Nidda)

40th Division (Leo Götz von Olenhusen)

=== VII Army Corps (Eberhardt von Claer) ===
13th Division (Kurt von dem Borne)

14th Division (Paul Fleck)

=== XIV Corps (Theodor von Watter) ===
28th Division (Kurt von Kehler)

29th Division (August Isbert)

== See also ==
- British Expeditionary Force order of battle (1914)
- German Army order of battle (1914)

== Sources ==
- Bell, Ron (May–June 2005). "The Old Contemptibles". Strategy & Tactics (228). Albany, NY: Project Analysis Corp. ISSN 0049-2310.
- Lomas, David; Ed Dovey (1998). First Ypres 1914: the graveyard of the Old Contemptibles. Oxford: Osprey Publishing. pp. 14–21. ISBN 1-85532-573-X.
