= Royal Artillery Mounted Rifles =

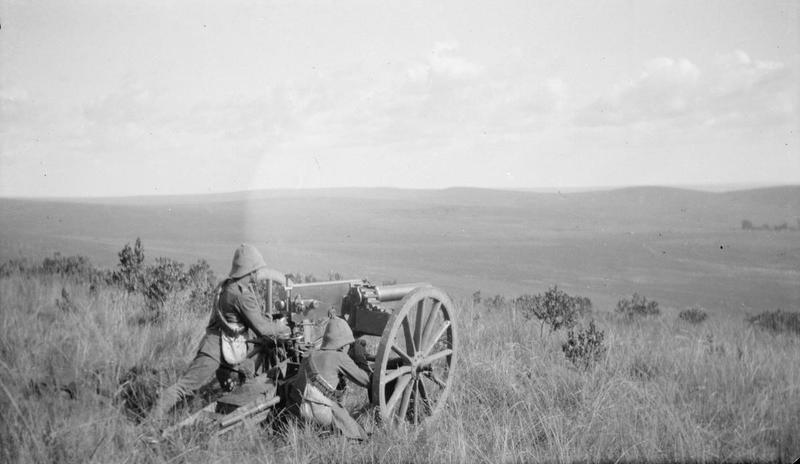
- A British pom-pom artillery piece
- Active: 1901–1902, 1920–21
- Country: United Kingdom
- Branch: British Army
- Type: Artillery
- Role: Mounted infantry
- Size: Circa 2,000 men
- Nickname: "Infantillery Corps"
- Engagements: Second Boer War; Irish War of Independence

The Royal Artillery Mounted Rifles were detachments of the British Army's Royal Artillery when deployed as mounted infantry. The units were first developed towards the end of the Second Boer War which was characterised by guerrilla warfare. There was little call for traditional units of field or horse artillery but high demand for mounted infantrymen to counter the highly mobile Boer commandos. By the end of the war around 2,000 artillerymen were acting in the mounted infantry role. A similar force was deployed to Ireland in the early 1920s to counter guerrilla tactics used by Irish republicans.

== Second Boer War ==
The final year of the Second Boer War (1899–1902) was characterised by guerrilla warfare fought between mounted Boer commandos and British mobile columns. With little use for heavy calibre weaponry in such an environment both sides stood down much of their artillery units. With a large number of artillerymen gathering at depots awaiting return to England or deployment on garrison duty in India, British commander Lord Kitchener decided to form them into units of mounted infantry. The artillerymen were suited to this task as they were trained to a good standard of horsemanship and tended to be of above average intelligence and discipline. Additional rifle shooting practice was arranged for the men, as this was not usually a core aspect of their training.

The Royal Artillery Mounted Rifles were formed into independent columns of around 750 men commanded by a Royal Artillery lieutenant-colonel. One such column was commanded by Thomas Baldock, who would later become a Major-General. In addition to mounted infantry the columns contained a light pom-pom artillery unit and their own signals and scout sections. The men were not issued with swords and so relied on rifles with fixed bayonets when required to carry out cavalry-style charges. The units remained under the administration of the Royal Regiment of Artillery who retained responsibility for forming and equipping the units, supply, remounts, staffing and signals.

The RAMR took the field for the first time during the 'New Model Drives' that rounded up hundreds of Boers in January–February 1902. For these operations three columns of RAMR were drawn from the Royal Horse Artillery (RHA) and Royal Field Artillery (RFA):

- Colonel James Dunlop's Column
  - 8th Brigade-Division, RFA – Major Young
    - 37th, 61st, 65th Howitzer Batteries
  - 12th Brigade-Division, RFA – Maj Guinness
    - 43rd, 86th, 87th Howitzer Batteries
  - Two Colt machine guns, one pom-pom
- Col Sir John Jervis's Column
  - 5th Brigade-Division, RFA – Col Thomas Baldock
    - 63rd, 64th, 73rd Batteries
  - 9th Brigade-Division, RFA – Maj A. D'A. King
    - 19th, 20th, 28th Batteries
  - One pom-pom
- Col John Keir's Column
  - 1st Group – Maj Ducrot
    - J (less one section) and P Batteries, RHA
  - 2nd Group – Maj F. Lecky
    - T and O Batteries, RHA
  - 3rd Group – Maj Mercer
    - G and R Batteries, RHA
  - Two guns, 5th Battery, RFA
  - One pom-pom

Dunlop's RAMR served with Col the Hon Julian Byng's column and Jervis's RAMR served with Col Michael Rimington's column; Keir's Column acted independently.

The RAMR units were so successful that Kitchener requested a further 1,000 gunners from the Indian government to deploy in the role; this was refused but a comparable number of artillerymen were instead supplied by the British Army. By the end of the war around 2,000 artillery personnel were serving as mounted infantry.

At the time they were formed, British General Ian Hamilton stated that the artillerymen were keen to carry out their new role. However, Colonel H. Rowan-Robinson, writing in 1921, claimed that the decision was viewed with horror by a large number of the artillerymen due to the unconventional nature of the deployment.

=== Kipling poem ===
The unit is commemorated in Rudyard Kipling's 1903 poem Ubique which commemorates the Royal Artillery's service in the war (Ubique is the regimental motto). The poem includes the lines:

Ubique means "More mounted men. Return all guns to store."
Ubique means the R. A. M. R. Infantillery Corps!

This refers to the re-roling of the artillery as a mounted infantry force without their guns. Kipling refers to the unit as "infantillery", a portmanteau of infantry and artillery that he may well have coined, which reflects the role and origins of the unit.

== Irish War of Independence ==
The concept was revived in the early 1920s during and immediately after the Irish War of Independence, another largely-guerrilla war. The bulk of the XXX Brigade, Royal Field Artillery (RFA) and XXXVI Brigade RFA, attached to the 5th Infantry Division, were deployed as mounted rifles or else as composite artillery/infantry units. For a brief period in early 1922 they reverted to the traditional artillery role. The I Brigade, Royal Horse Artillery (RHA)also deployed to Ireland as mounted infantry while the XXXIII Brigade RFA operated as a mixed armoured car/infantry unit.

Four formal regiments were organised for service in Ireland, with squadrons made up of personnel drawn from various brigades:

- 1st Regiment, Royal Artillery Mounted Rifles – formed 23 June 1921
  - A Squadron – V Brigade, RFA
  - B Squadron – VI Brigade, RFA
  - C Squadron – XII Brigade, RFA
- 2nd Regiment, Royal Artillery Mounted Rifles – formed 1 July 1921
  - A Squadron – V Brigade, RFA and N Battery, RHA
  - B Squadron – VIII Brigade, RFA
  - C Squadron – IX or XXXVII Brigades, RFA
- 3rd Regiment, Royal Artillery Mounted Rifles – formed 17 June 1921
  - A Squadron – VII Brigade, RFA
  - B Squadron – XV Brigade, RFA
  - C Squadron – XXXV Brigade, RFA
- 4th Regiment, Royal Artillery Mounted Rifles – formed 1921
  - A Squadron – IV Brigade, RFA
  - B Squadron – XIV Brigade, RFA
  - C Squadron – XXXIV Brigade, RFA

All four regiments were disbanded in 1922, the 4th Regiment on 31 January.
