= 12th (Howitzer) Brigade, Royal Field Artillery =

Brigade of the Royal Field Artillery in WWI

XII (Howitzer) Brigade, RFA
- Royal Artillery cap badge
- Active: 1900–1920
- Country: United Kingdom
- Branch: British Army
- Role: Field artillery
- Size: 2–3 Batteries
- Part of: 6th Division; 67th (2nd Home Counties) Division
- Engagements: Second Boer War; World War I: First Battle of the Aisne; Battle of Armentières; Action of Hooge

Commanders
- Notable commanders: Maj-Gen J.S.S. Barker; Brig-Gen G. Humphreys; Lt-Col H.M. Davson

XII (Howitzer) Brigade (12th (Howitzer) Brigade) was a unit of Britain's Royal Field Artillery from 1900 until 1920, seeing service during the Second Boer War as mounted infantry. In World War I it served with 6th Divisional Artillery on the Aisne and during the Race to the Sea, later in the Ypres Salient. In 1916 it was broken up and reformed as a field gun brigade in home defence. Demobilised after the Armistice, it was quickly reformed, but was absorbed into another brigade in 1920.

== Origin ==
Traditionally, the basic unit of the Royal Artillery (RA) has always been the battery. Although batteries were organised into 'battalions', these were purely administrative groupings. Between 1859 and 1900, independent batteries were brigaded together into geographic groups termed at different times 'brigades', 'divisions' or 'brigade divisions' (though the titles had no connection with the field formations of the same names). The Second Boer War saw brigade divisions of three batteries established as a permanent unit type of the Royal Field Artillery, under the command of a lieutenant-colonel and comparable with an infantry battalion or cavalry regiment; they were redesignated simply brigades in 1903. One such new unit was XII Brigade Division, (Note: Regular RFA Brigades were designated by Roman numerals until 1938 when they were designated as regiments.) formed in March 1900 as its constituent batteries were sent to South Africa for service against the Boers. Commanded by Lt-Col John Barker and equipped with BL 5-inch howitzers, (Note: Howitzers had only recently been reintroduced to the Royal Artillery's equipment, and no tactical doctrine had been worked out for them; they were frequently misused as ordinary field artillery.) it had the following organisation:

- 43rd (Howitzer) Battery (Note: Originally formed in 1806, this battery had been O Bty in 1st Bde in 1877, and was numbered in 1889.)
- 86th (Howitzer) Battery (Note: Originally raised in 1871, this battery had been converted from a depot battery and numbered in 1895.)
- 87th (Howitzer) Battery (Note: First formed in 1803, this battery had also been converted from a depot battery in 1895.)
- 12th Brigade Division Ammunition Column

== Second Boer War ==
On the outbreak of the war in 1899, 43rd (H) Bty had been at Shorncliffe, 86th (H) Bty at Newcastle upon Tyne and 87th (H) Bty at Seaforth. They were sent to South Africa in early 1900 to reinforce the troops already there for the projected advance. At first the batteries remained independent and the brigade-division was not concentrated. On 14 April the British commander, Lord Roberts, allocated 43rd and 87th (H) Btys to the Corps Artillery of his main army at Bloemfontein while 86th (H) Bty was with the Corps Artillery of Sir Redvers Buller's Natal Army, On 24 April 87th (H) Bty joined Sir Ian Hamilton's force that had just captured the waterworks outside Bloemfontein, and by 5 June Roberts had marched from Bloemfontein to capture Johannesberg and Pretoria.

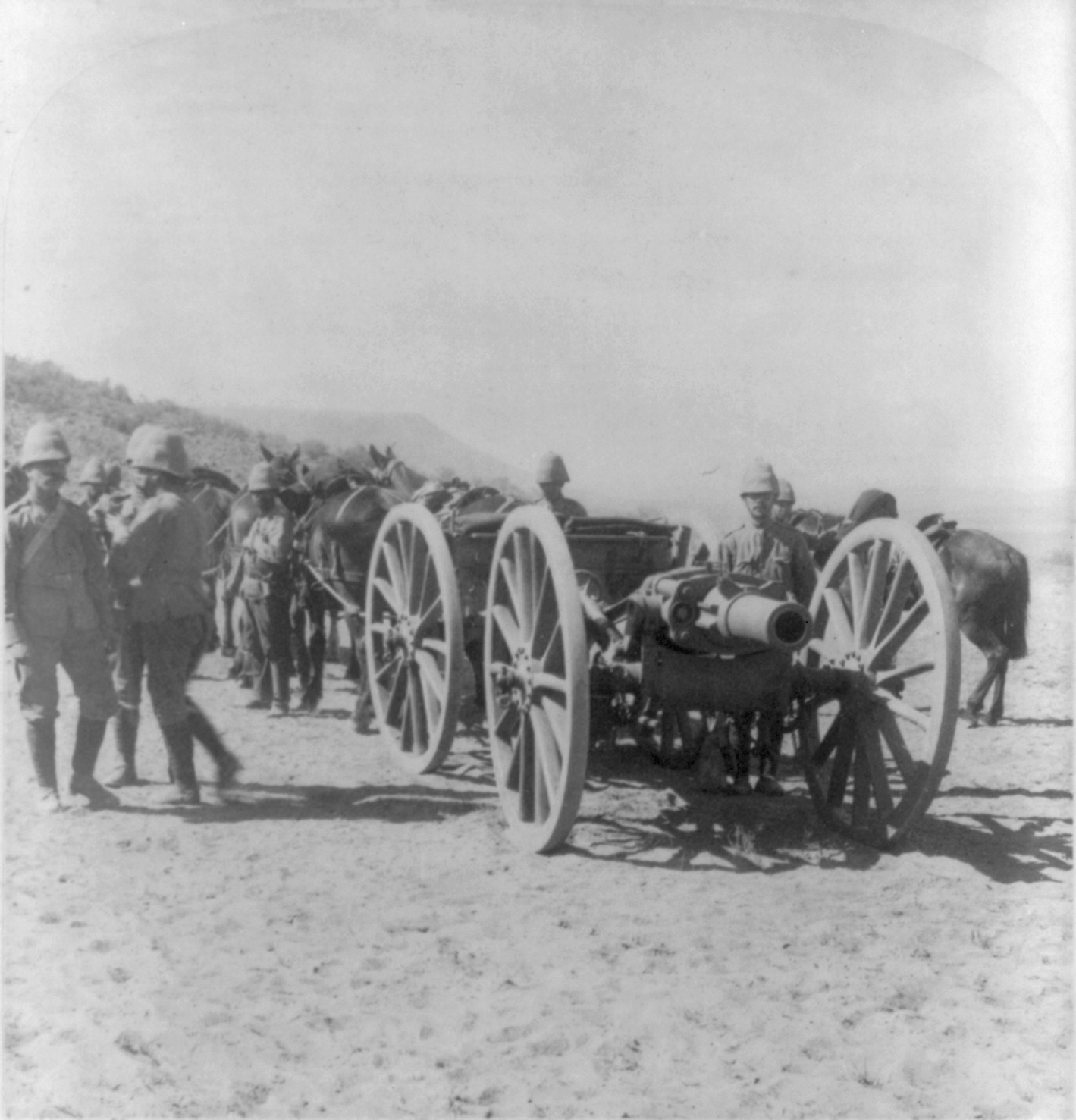
5-inch howitzer in the Second Boer War.

With the loss of the main Boer cities, the period of pitched battles was ending and the Boers adopted Guerrilla warfare. Increasingly, artillery brigades and batteries were broken up as the British employed mobile columns often with only a pair of guns, or even single guns. The RFA lieutenant-colonels became district or column commanders and the ammunition columns formed local depots of men, guns, horses and ammunition for the sections in the field. For example, two howitzers of 43rd Bty accompanied Sir Archibald Hunter's column in September 1900 as he endeavoured to trap Christiaan de Wet's forces in the Doornberg area. Sir Henry Hildyard employed a larger concentration of artillery, including two howitzers of 86th (H) Bty, to bombard Boer positions when he forced the Winderhoogte defile on 10 September. In November two howitzers of 86th (H) Bty were guarding the railway in the Dundee Sub-district of the Johannesburg–Durban Line. At the end of November De Wet was trapped between the Orange and Caledon rivers, but the rain stopped and he got away once the Caledon became fordable pursued by three columns, including one commanded by Lt-Col Barker with a section of his 86th (H) Bty. The columns were often in sight of their prey, but only rarely got into artillery range and he disappeared into the mountains.

In January 1901 De Wet prepared to invade Cape Colony from the Doornberg, and the British columns were reorganised to prevent him. Part of 43rd (H) Bty was with White's column (incorporatimg part of Barker's column) in Maj-Gen Bruce Hamilton's force, while two howitzers of 86th (H) Bty were with Pilcher's column in Maj-Gen Charles Knox's force. When De Wet slipped between Hamilton and Knox's forces, Knox pursued while Hamilton was moved south by railway to forestall him. De Wet also avoided this block, and the British columns reorganised for what became known as the 'Great De Wet Hunt'. Hamilton and Knox were on the Orange River near Bethulie, and two howitzers of 43rd (H) Bty were with Hickman's newly organised column in reserve near Naauwpoort. This combination again failed to stop De Wet and Knox set off in pursuit. However, De Wet's incursion into Cape Colony failed to raise a rebellion there, and he had to return to Orange Free State where he disappeared again, having lost his wagons and guns. The Great Hunt was called off in late February.

Simultaneously, single howitzers of 87th (H) Bty accompanied the columns of Colonels Edmund Allenby and William Pulteney operating against Gen Louis Botha in Eastern Transvaal from 28 January. Next day the two columns combined to turn the Boers off their position on Boschman's Kop. They followed up and found the Boers in position with some artillery, forcing them out on 1 and 2 February. The British columns then converged on Ermelo, with Pulteney advancing directly up the road. Although Botha was prevented from invading Natal, the columns were too scattered to stop his commandos escaping. Pulteney found Ermelo deserted, and Allenby was held up by a resolute Boer rearguard.

A new series of concentric drives began in Northwestern Free State in July 1901, with one howitzer of 43rd (H) Bty marching with Col W.H. Williams' column (Col Barker was commanding one of the 'Stop columns', based on Winburg, which he had fortified). The columns pursued Generals Koos de la Rey and Jan Kemp through the winter, but often the guns were held up by thick bush, which provided cover for the Boers.

=== Mounted Rifles ===
By the end of 1901 artillery had become almost irrelevant in the mobile guerrilla warfare then prevailing, but the British forces had a desperate need for more mounted troops. One solution was to convert artillery units into mounted infantry, known as the Royal Artillery Mounted Rifles, riding battery horses. The whole of XII (H) Brigade Division, under Maj C.D. Guinness of 86th (H) Bty, combined with VIII Brigade Division to form Colonel James Dunlop's Column about 750 strong. The RAMR assembled at Pretoria and took the field for the first time during the 'New Model Drives' that rounded up hundreds of Boers in January–February 1902. Dunlop's RAMR served with Col the Hon Julian Byng's column in northeastern Orange Free State.

Before the drive by parallel columns began, Byng's column had been positioned near Reitz to watch Boer movements, prevent any hostile groups coming together, and to find Commandant Mears and the remaining Boer artillery. On 1 February De Wet ordered a rendezvous with Mears, but Byng was between them, posted on the banks of the Liebenbergsvlei River. Attempting to cross, Mears was driven back with the loss of his artillery. On 5 February the British columns began the 'Drive' with a cordon of mounted men at intervals of 10 yards pushing towards the blockhouse line along the railway, 50 miles ahead. The drive took three days and two nights, and stringent precautions were taken to prevent any Boers slipping back through the cordon at night. The first drive was only partly successful: De Wet broke through the blockhouse line with several hundred Boers. But a second drive immediately followed to clear the next area of the Free State. On the night of 23 February at Langverwagt, De Wet attempted to force a break in the cordon with a picked force of Boers, to allow the convoy of wagons carrying the Free State government and civilians to escape northwards. In the confusion, Commandant Jan Meyer with the Harrismith Commando lost their bearings and ran into the section of the line held by Dunlop's gunners. They were repulsed with losses, and fled south. Again, De Wet got away with a hard core of Boers and some of the civilians, but hundreds were caught in the closing net and forced to surrender, including Meyer and over 570 Harrismith men. The drives continued, Col Barker now commanding a group of six small columns, and in May the Boers finally surrendered, signing the Treaty of Vereeniging.

== Postwar ==
After the end of the war XII (H) Brigade returned to Newcastle, now under the command of Brevet Colonel F. Waldron, later of Bt-Col A.S. Pratt. (Note: Colonel J.S.S. Barker was promoted to major-general in 1909 and in 1914 was commanding the RA in Malta.) During 1905 it moved to the Royal Artillery Barracks, Woolwich, coming under the command of Lt-Col J.B. Langley, and by 1909 it had gone to Aldershot. During 1910 the brigade moved to Deepcut Barracks near Farnborough, Hampshire, and Lt-Col W.A. Robinson took command, followed by Lt-Col W.T. Furse during 1912. By the end of 1913 the brigade had crossed to Ireland.

By the outbreak of World War I, the howitzer batteries were each equipped with six 4.5-inch howitzers. Ammunition columns were only formed when a brigade was mobilised for active service. As part of the Haldane reforms in 1908 the men of the former Artillery Militia units of the Royal Garrison Artillery (RGA) joined the part-time Special Reserve as the Royal Field Reserve Artillery. Their wartime role was to form brigade ammunition columns (BACs) for the RFA. (Note: At the outbreak of World War I, a field artillery brigade comprised headquarters (4 officers, 37 other ranks (ORs), three batteries (each of 5 officers and 193 ORs), and a brigade ammunition column (4 officers and 154 ORs))

== World War I ==
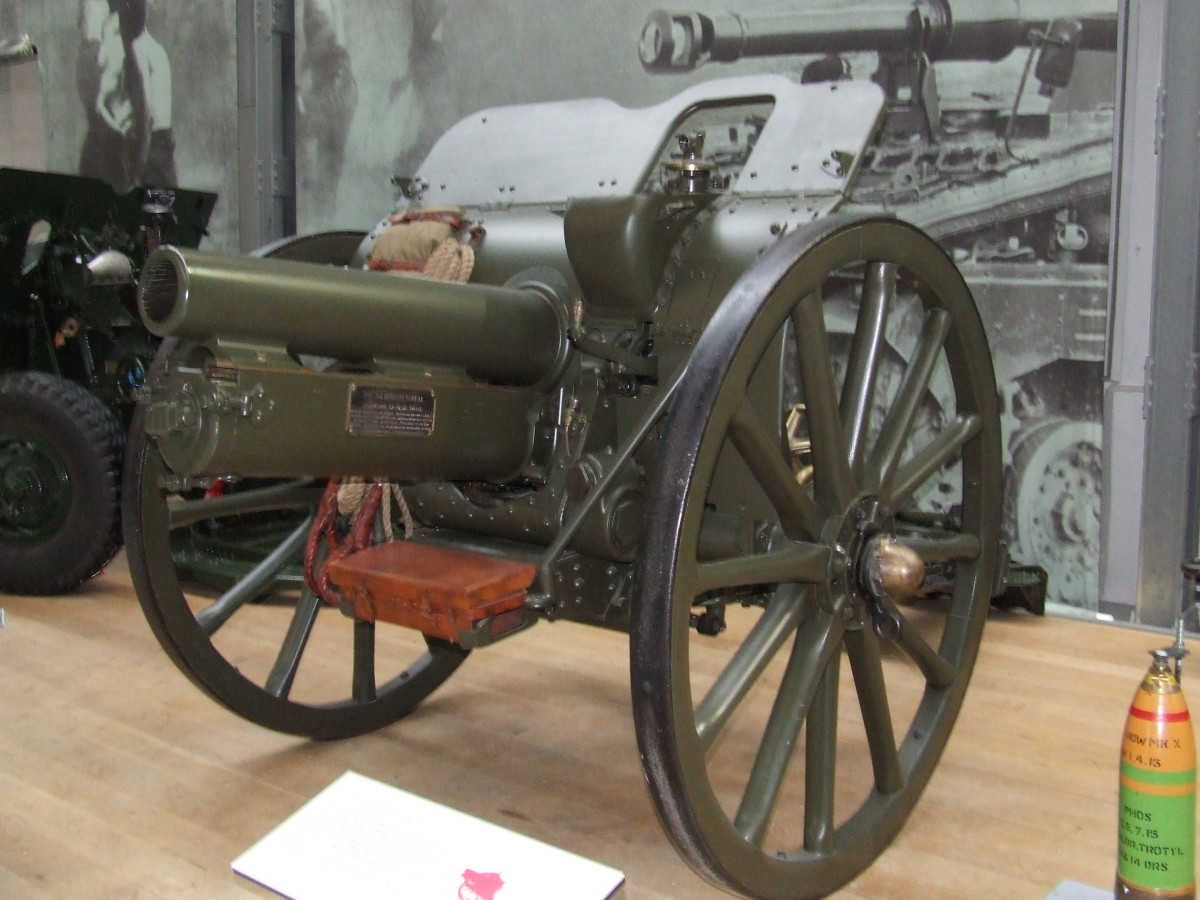
4.5-inch Howitzer in the collection of the Royal Artillery Museum.

=== Mobilisation ===
On the outbreak of war in Europe in August 1914, XII (H) Brigade was stationed in Ireland, under the command of Lt-Col G. Humphreys, with the following dispositions:

- Brigade HQ at Clonmel
- 43rd (H) Bty at Fethard
- 86th (H) Bty at Clonmel
- 87th (H) Bty at Kilkenny
- XII (H) BAC mobilising at Curragh Camp

Under the mobilisation scheme, a number of units in Ireland including XII (H) Bde were assigned to 6th Division of the British Expeditionary Force (BEF), which would serve on the Western Front. XII (H) Brigade received the order to mobilise on 5 August, and on 15 August it moved to Queenstown where the batteries boarded SS Cymric bound for Liverpool. On arrival in England it joined 6th Division concentrated in camps around Cambridge and took part in divisional training. Then on 7 September it entrained for Southampton, the port of embarkation for France. 43rd and 86th (H) Btys boarded the transport Kingstonian, 87th (H) Bty on SS Cornishman, while the BAC went on Cornishman and SS Bellerophon.

=== Western Front ===
The brigade disembarked at St-Nazaire on 10 September, and entrained for the front. By 13 September, 6th Division had concentrated at Coulommiers, east of Paris, and next day it moved up to join the BEF, which was attacking on the Aisne.

==== Aisne ====
6th Division's formation sign.

6th Division joined III Corps and was initially split up to reinforce the already hard-pressed formations of that corps and I Corps. XII (H) Bde was detached to 5th Division, and after dark on 16 September its batteries 'came into action' near La Pavillon Farm, where they dug in their guns overnight. They opened fire the following day, shelling the dominating village of Chivres and setting it on fire. The brigade's guns fired very little on the morning of 18 September and at noon it was transferred to 4th Division, moving to Venizel where it could observe enemy trenches on the Vregny Plateau. Next day the batteries registered their howitzers on these trenches with the help of an observation aircraft. Aerial observation was already proving its value in the hilly ground along the Aisne: on 21 September 43rd (H) Bty shelled a position where a 'Zeppelin' (probably an observation balloon) was reported to be inflating. Next day Brigade HQ was shot up by a German aircraft. I Corps' HQ also began to exert more control over the artillery, a battery of XII (H) Bde coming under a group that could rapidly switch fire from one point to another of the corps' front. Little happened on 4th Division's front for the next few days, and late on 25 September the brigade was ordered to reconnoitre alternative positions along the river from which it could bring fire to bear on enemy artillery around Pont Rouge; the brigade commander chose positions at Le Moncel. On 26 September 87th (H) Bty was ordered to fire in support of a French attack on trenches by Perriere Farm, but the observation aircraft could not locate the target and the attack was delayed un til 30 September. The fighting of the First Battle of the Aisne was dying down and the front was settling down into Trench warfare. 4th Division continued holding its line, and XII (H) Bde moved sections of howitzers to different positions to bring enemy trenches along the Maubeuge road under fire. 87th (H) Battery shelled a haystack by the road that the Germans were using as an observation post (OP), and the brigade silenced an enemy howitzer battery.

The Race to the Sea then got under way, and the BEF moved north to prevent the German forces outflanking the Allies. XII (H) Brigade reverted to the command of 6th Divisional Artillery (6th DA) on 2 October, and entrained at Longueil-Sainte-Marie on 9–10 October. On arrival at Saint-Omer the brigade was immediately reorganised by 6th DA: 43rd (H) Bty went to XXIV Bde in exchange for 112th Bty, and 87th (H) Bty exchanged with 72nd Bty of XXXVIII Bde. 72nd and 112th Batteries were both equipped with 18-pounder field guns rather than howitzers. XII (H) BAC had to exchange some of its 4.5-inch ammunition waggons for 18-pounder and small arms ammunition waggons.

==== Armentières ====
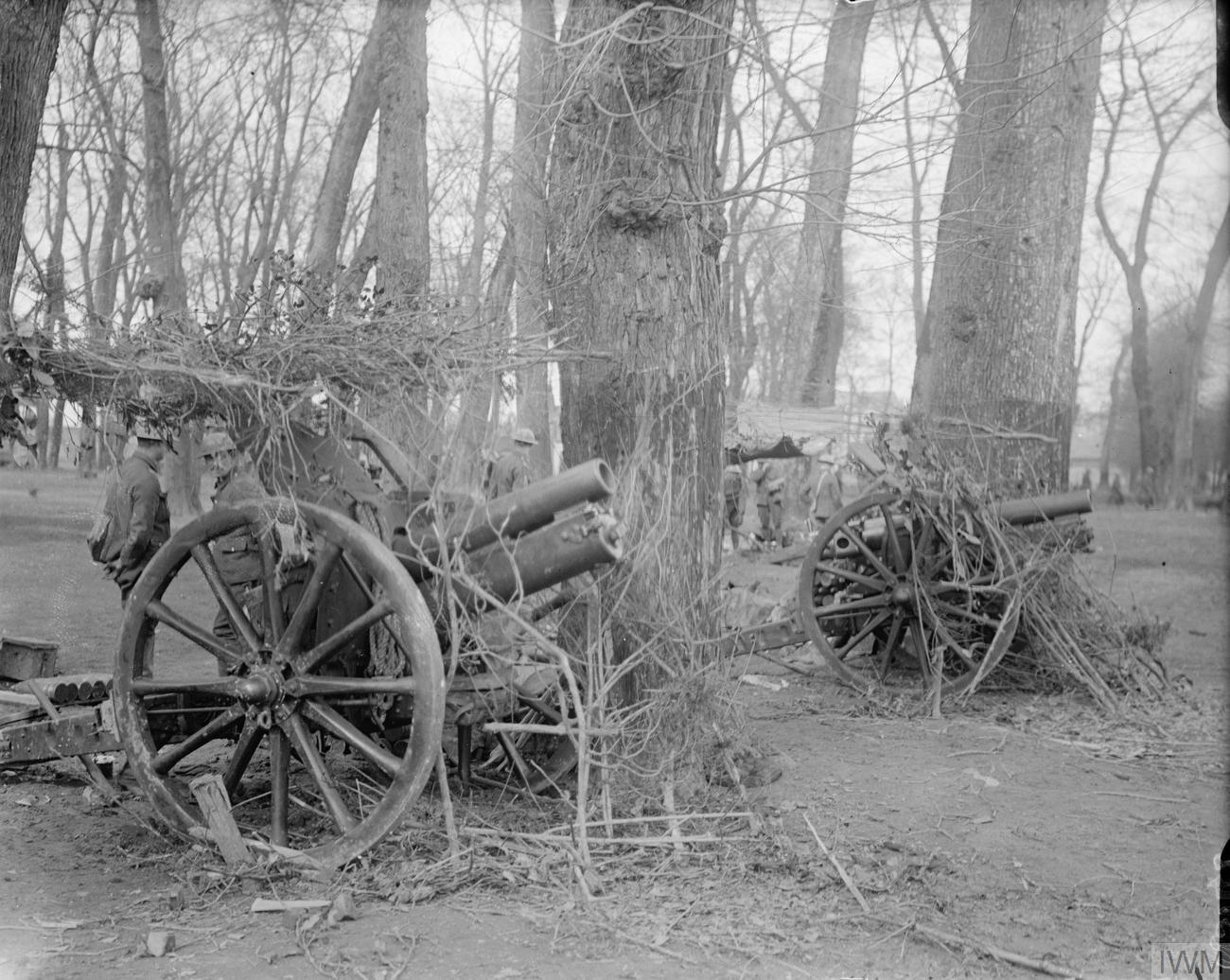
Camouflaged 4.5-inch howitzers deployed on the Western Front.

The Germans were advancing between Armentières and La Bassée in an attempt to turn the Allied flank, and as soon as it detrained III Corps advanced via Hazebrouck to meet them. The artillery started off, leaving the infantry to be brought up by French motor buses. On 13 October, 6th Division found the Germans entrenched across their front along the line of the Méterenbecque stream. Their line ran along a low ridge and the town of Méteren, against which III Corps launched an attack at 14.00. launching the Battle of Armentières. XII Brigade came into action north-east of Strazeele, supporting 17th Infantry Brigade. The hazy weather made observation difficult but XII Bde claimed that it was able to provide good support by using forward observation officers (FOOs). The batteries prepared to support a resumption of the attack next morning, but the FOO of 43rd (H) Bty reported that the enemy had vacated their positions during the night. The brigade was ordered up to support 19th Infantry Brigade, marching through Bailleul in heavy rain and halting on the Lille road where it was held up by a traffic jam. The gunners bivouacked in Bailleul that night. Part of 72nd Bty stood by for action as III Corps continued its advance on 15 October, and the brigade was about to return to billets in Bailleul when 6th Division was ordered to secure the bridges over the River Lys at Sailly that evening. XII Brigade advanced beyond Steenwerck and then went into cold and wet bivouacs that night and the whole of the next day.

III Corps began a general advance on 17 October, encountering little opposition as it entered Armentières, and 6th DA moved up through Fleurbaix before going into billets at Bac St Maur. Next day it supported 16th Infantry Brigade, with 86th (H) Bty coming into action at Bois-Grenier. The German resistance had now hardened, and on 19 October 86th (H) and 112nd Btys supported 16th Bde's infantry who were holding a line south of Chateau de Flandres, 72nd Bty coming up from reserve later in the day. Over the coming days the batteries engaged various targets, principally parties of German infantry entrenching their positions. On 20 October the Germans made determined attempts to break through the positions of 1st Battalion Buffs at the chateau, but were halted by effective fire brought down by XII Bde's FOOs. However, the Germans made more progress elsewhere and 6th Division had to give ground. It held its positions around Bois-Grenier for the rest of the month, the artillery giving good support. On 23 October XII Bde drove off some German batteries coming into action near Ennetières church, causing considerable losses.

After the Battle of Armentières died down on 2 November, 6th Division as part of III Corps continued to hold the front in this sector. XII Brigade disposed its batteries such that one section of each was in action at any one time. On 5 November 86th (H) Bty was detached to 4th Division to replace units sent north for the fighting round Messines; it returned on 8 November. There was some firing at enemy-held farms and trenches, and some enemy shelling received in reply, but shortage of ammunition often kept the field artillery inactive through the winter. XII Brigade went into reserve and overhauled its guns in early December, returning to its old positions on 9 December. Despite the shortages of ammunition, XII Bde supported an attack by the neighbouring 7th Division on 18 December. German counter-battery (CB) fire forced 72nd Bty to shift from its positions in January 1915. 6th DA carried out bombardments of German barbed wire and defences on 10 March 1915 as a demonstration to draw attention away from the attack at Neuve Chapelle.

==== Spring 1915 ====
In February 86th (H) Bty was relieved in the line by an ad hoc four-gun battery under Maj Woodside made up from one section each from 43rd and 87th (H) Btys. 86th (H) Battery and a section of the BAC were attached to the newly arrived 28th Division from 2 to 23 February, and on their return 'Woodside's Battery' left the brigade. On 18 April Lt-Col Humphreys and half the brigade HQ staff were detached to 4th Divisional Artillery at Le Bizet to organise a howitzer group including 87th (H) Bty and Woodside's (now St Clair's) Bty. This was engaged in the Second Battle of Ypres, but was broken up on 29 April and the HQ detachment returned. The rest of the brigade fired regular registration shots and occasionally bombarded a German position, but was otherwise unengaged.

By the spring of 1915, most divisional artilleries in the BEF had a howitzer brigades of just two batteries, and on 18 May 86th (H) Bty was transferred to 127th (H) Bde in 4th DA. 72nd and 112th 18-pounder batteries left to rejoin their original brigades on 27 May, and 43rd and 87th (H) Btys returned to XII (H) Bde. Lieutenant-Col Humphreys was promoted to Brigadier-General and took over as Commander, Royal Artillery (CRA), of 6th Division. Major H.M. Davson joined XII (H) Bde as its new commander, and was later promoted to Lt-Col. The reformed brigade then marched to take over gun positions near Poperinge, with Bde HQ near Vlamertinge. (Note: In June 1916 Brig-Gen Humphreys became CRA IX Corps.)

==== Hooge ====
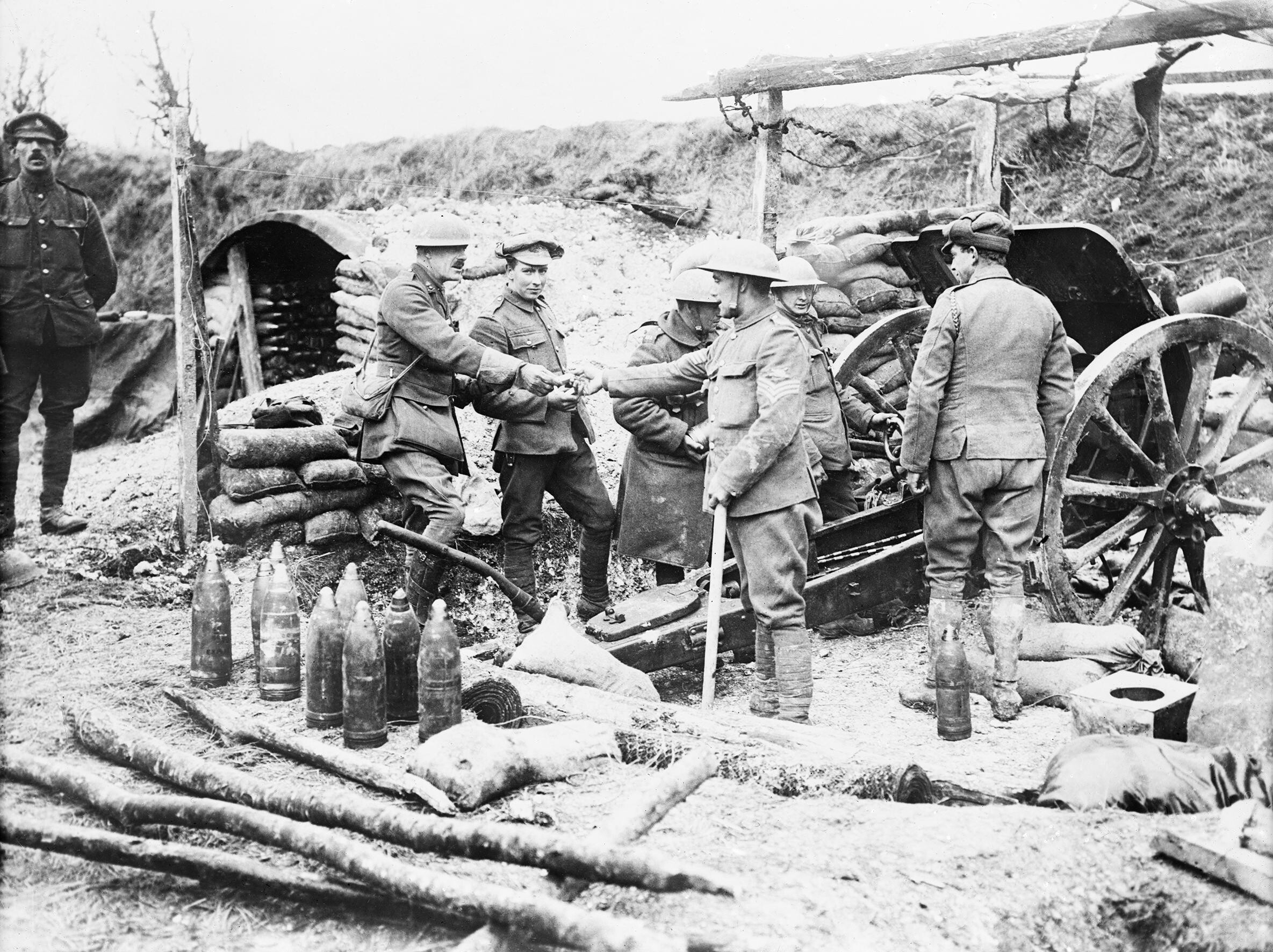
An emplaced 4.5-inch howitzer on the Western Front.

The brigade's new positions were within the Ypres Salient, where 6th Division had been transferred to VI Corps. On 28 July XII Bde HQ moved into Reigersburg Chateau north-west of Ypres and made arrangements to cover the front of 14th (Light) Division which was fighting at Hooge. 43rd (H) Battery was positioned near the chateau, two guns of 87th (H) Bty at Poitijze and the rest of the battery east of the canal in the northern outskirts of Ypres. From 1 August these batteries carried out daily pre-dawn bombardments of the enemy trenches round Hooge. Although 43rd (H) Bty was firing at a range of 6,000 yards (5,500 m), it was able accurately to place shells on German trenches only 100 yards (91 m) from the British positions. The Salient was a particularly dangerous sector, and 87th (H) Bty lost 10 per cent of its strength as casualties during preparations for this battle, mainly among signallers repairing telephone wires to the observation post (OPs). On 2–4 August, 6th Division quietly and unnoticed relieved 14th (L) Division in the line and prepared to make a set-piece attack to recover the lost ground, while neighbouring divisions carried out diversions. Brigadier-Gen Humphreys drew up a careful artillery plan for the attack. On 9 August the brigade carried out a bombardment from 02.45 to 03.15 (indistinguishable from the usual morning 'hate' of preceding days) and the infantry launched their attack at daybreak, having deployed in No man's land close up to the falling shells. 16th and 18th Brigades made a concentric attack and went through the outer defences almost immediately, joining up at Hooge Crater where there was hand-to-hand fighting. Having fired Lyddite high explosive shells in the preliminary bombardment, 87th (H) Bty switched to Shrapnel shell and was able to break up enemy counter-attacks, its fire directed by the battery commander from an OP high up in the tower of the ruined Ypres Cathedral.

After this successful attack there was only desultory firing for the rest of August, and Bde HQ and in September half the sections at a time could be rested in reserve at Watou. On 2 October Brigade HQ took over control of the guns again, with 4th Siege Bty, RGA, under command as well as 87th (H) Bty, which had one gun at La Brique, two at Reigersburg, and three in 'the Hedge'. 43rd (H) Bty relieved 87th (H) Bty in the second half of the month. Much of the work now consisted of improving positions for the coming winter. On 22–3 November the whole brigade withdrew to Watou, and then moved to billets at Lederzeele for overhauls and inspections. On 16 December the two batteries returned to the front, temporarily under the command of the RFA brigades in place. Then on 23 December XII Bde HQ moved up and next day took over a concentrated group of howitzer batteries that could carry out retaliatory bombardments, which was first called upon on 31 December.

There was little change in the new year. At the end of January 1916 XII Bde HQ handed over 43rd and 87th (H) Btys to the other two RFA brigades in line, and moved back to Houtkerque to take charge of the waggon lines for all 10 batteries of 6th DA. Between the nights of 12/13 and 19/20 March the sections of 43rd and 87th (H) Btys were relieved by the divisional artillery of Guards Division and joined Bde HQ and the BAC in a move to Arnèke, where they overhauled equipment and carried out training. On 19 and 20 April XII Bde relieved a brigade of 20th (Light) Division in the north of the Ypres Salient, with Bde HQ at Elverdinge. Here Lt-Col Davson took command of the 'Left Group' of 6th DA's batteries, including 43rd (H) Bty and the whole of XXIV Bde, while 87th (H) Bty joined 'Right Group'. The front was very active, and 6th DA immediately supported an operation on 21 April to recapture trenches at Willow Walk. Two days later the Germans shelled the Elverdinge area and 43rd (H) Bty suffered a number of casualties. The Germans registered their guns again on 24 April and repeated the heavy bombardment of 6th DA's gun and BAC positions around Elverdinge and Poperinge on 26 April, while 6th DA fired retaliatory bombardments. The enemy shelling started a number of fires in the billets and gun positions. These exchanges of fire continued until the end of the month.

==== Disbandment ====
In May 1916, the artillery of infantry divisions were reorganised; the pure howitzer brigades were disbanded, and their batteries attached individually to field brigades, to produce mixed brigades of three field batteries and one howitzer battery. XII (H) Brigade was broken up among the other RFA brigades of 6th Division on 12 May: (Note: Lieutenant-Col Davson transferred to command CLIX (Glasgow) Bde, RFA, in 35th Division, a 'Kitchener's Army' formation; he later wrote that division's history.)

- 43rd (H) Bty (less one section) to XXIV Bde
- 87th (H) Bty (less one section) to II Bde
- D (H) Bty (formed from one section from each of the other batteries and the personnel of XII Bde HQ) to XXXVII Bde
- XII (H) BAC absorbed into 6th Divisional Ammunition Column

=== Home defence ===
XII Brigade, RFA, was reformed in the UK on 26 November 1917 and assigned to 67th (2nd Home Counties) Division, a 2nd Line Territorial Force (TF) formation whose divisional artillery had been sent to the Mesopotamian Front. The brigade was reformed from former Provisional (home service) TF batteries:

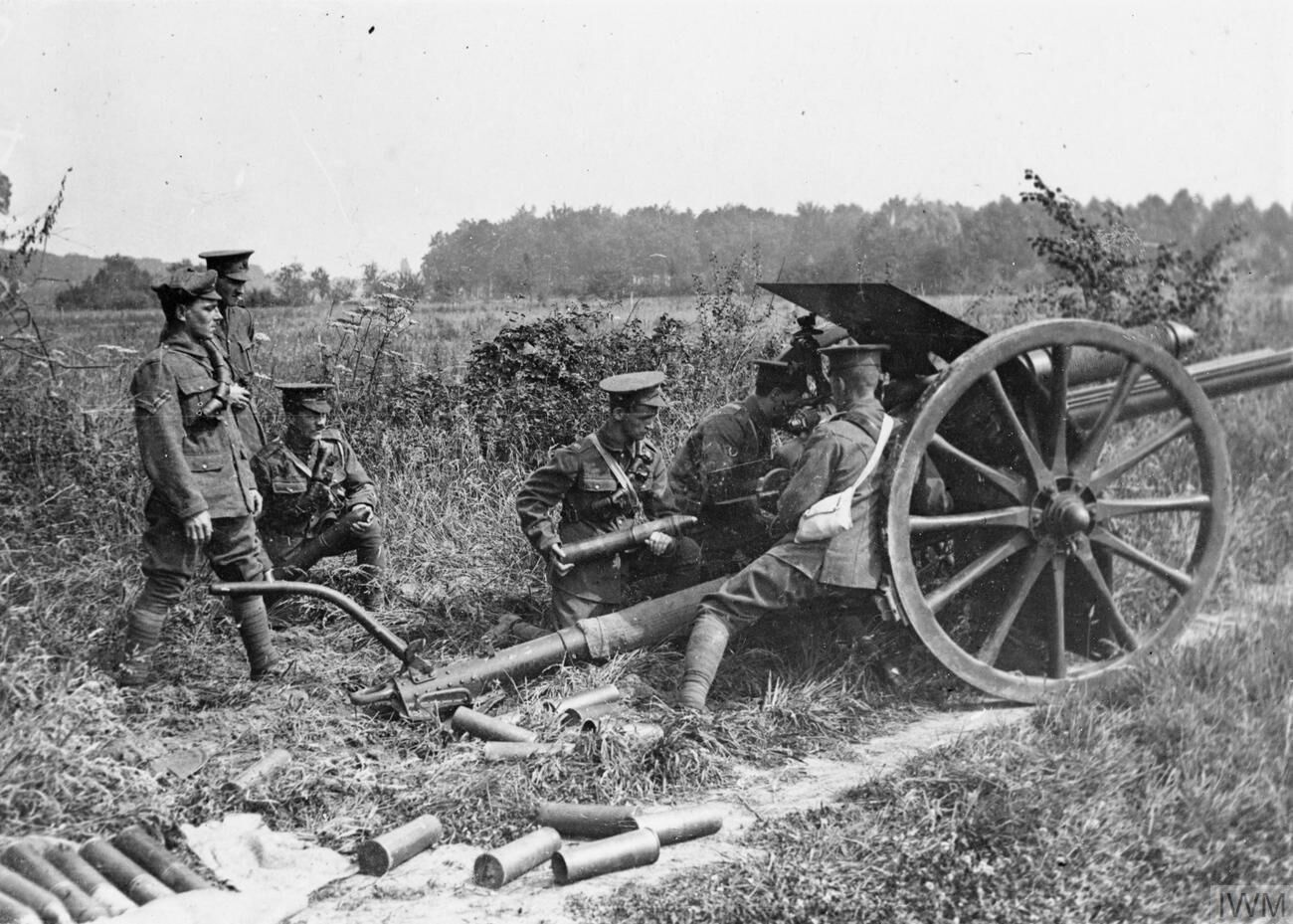
18-pounder in action.

- 1203rd (Lowland) Bty
- 1204th (Northumberland) Bty
- 1207th (Home Counties) Bty
- D (H) Bty

That winter 67th (2nd HC) Division was deployed in Eastern England, with the field artillery between Colchester and Ipswich. It maintained these stations for the rest of the war.

== Post-Armistice ==
After the Armistice with Germany 67th (2nd HC) Division and its units were progressively demobilised, the artillery beginning disbandment in March 1919.

As a unit of the Regular Army, XII Brigade, RFA, was soon reformed. During 1919 a cadre from the disbanded LIX Brigade, RFA, (a Kitchener's Army unit formerly with 11th (Northern) Division) reformed the brigade at Deepcut, the former A/59, B/59 and C/59 batteries being redesignated 157th, 158th and 159th Btys. In addition, 429th (H) Bty, RFA, (which had been converted from No 77 Company, Royal Garrison Artillery, in 1918 and served in 15th Indian Division in Mesopotamia.) joined and became 160th (H) Bty, absorbing D (H)/59 Bty.

However, postwar retrenchment of the Regular Army continued, and a number of units underwent mergers. On 23 March 1920 12th Bde was broken up: Brigade HQ merged into HQ 19th Brigade, RFA, 157th, 158th and 159th Btys were disbanded, and 160th (H) Bty transferred to 13th Brigade, RFA.

The existing XL Bde was then renumbered XII Bde and served under that designation through the interwar years. In 1938 it became 12th Field Regiment, Royal Artillery, and served in the defence of Malta during World War II before being converted into a medium artillery regiment under a different designation.
