= John Keir =

British Army general

Lieutenant-General Sir John Keir KCB
- Born: 6 July 1856
- Died: 3 May 1937 (aged 80); Leamington
- Military career
- Branch: British Army
- Service years: 1876–1918
- Rank: Lieutenant-General
- Nickname: Matador
- Unit: Royal Artillery
- Commands: 1st Battalion, Imperial Yeomanry; South Midland Division; 6th Division; VI Corps
- Conflicts: Boer War; First World War
- Awards: Knight Commander of the Order of the Bath; Mentioned in Despatches; Médaille militaire Order of the Crown (Belgium)

Lieutenant-General Sir John Lindesay Keir KCB (6 July 1856 – 3 May 1937) was a British soldier and general of the late 19th and early 20th century. He fought in the Second Boer War, and commanded the 6th Division and the VI Corps of the British Army on the Western Front during World War I.

== Early career ==
After receiving his early formal education at Wimbledon College, Keir studied at the Royal Military Academy, Woolwich, from where he received a commission into the Royal Artillery in February 1876. He was posted to a battery in India, and after six years was awarded his "jacket" and transferred into the Royal Horse Artillery. In 1884, promoted to captain, he returned to the Royal Field Artillery. He had become a skilled rider in the artillery, and whilst he was too heavy to compete in traditional horse-racing, he participated in point-to-point racing and similar events. After attending the School of Gunnery he attended the Staff College, Camberley, from 1893–1894, and passed out, newly promoted to major on 9 November 1892, to command a field battery in England.

== Second Boer War ==
Keir later transferred back to the R.H.A., and was commanding a battery at the outbreak of the 2nd Boer War in October 1899. His unit was not sent out with the Expeditionary Force, and he remained at home during the early stages of the war. However, in early 1901 he was promoted to lieutenant-colonel and offered command of the 1st Battalion of the newly formed Imperial Yeomanry, volunteer mounted infantry being raised for service in South Africa. He commanded the battalion for several months along the Orange River, and in December 1901 was assigned to command the Royal Artillery Mounted Rifles, a similar force drawn from regular artillerymen; he remained with this unit until shortly before the end of the war, and received the brevet rank of colonel in the South Africa Honours list published on 26 June 1902. For his services in South Africa, he was mentioned in despatches (dated 8 April 1902) as well as awarded the Queen's medal with five clasps. Following the end of the war in June 1902, he returned to the United Kingdom in the ship S.S. Dunottar Castle, which arrived at Southampton in July 1902.

== 1902–1914 ==
He had transferred back to the R.H.A. as a lieutenant-colonel in April 1902, and was posted to India, where he was formally promoted to colonel and appointed an assistant adjutant-general in September 1904. In 1907, he was given the command of a brigade at Allahabad, for which he was granted the temporary rank of brigadier general in October, He was made a Companion of the Order of the Bath in June of that year. He was promoted to major general in July 1909, and returned home in 1911.

In July 1912 he was given command of the South Midland Division, part of the Territorial Force (TF), taking over from Major General Alexander Thorneycroft. He remained with them until July 1914, when he was transferred to succeed Major General William Pulteney in command of the 6th Division, a Regular Army formation at that time based in Ireland.

== First World War ==
Keir had hardly been in command of the 6th Division for a month when the First World War began, and it was mobilised as part of the British Expeditionary Force (BEF) for service in Europe. However, the original plan of sending six divisions to France was altered due to fears of German landings in the United Kingdom, and the 6th Division spent the first month of the war in reserve in East Anglia. In September it landed in France, and immediately saw service at the Battle of the Aisne. Later in the year, he commanded it in action at the Battle of Armentières.

In February 1915 he was made a Knight Commander of the Order of the Bath (KCB), "in connection with Operations in the Field". In late May, Keir was promoted to temporary lieutenant general appointed to take command of the newly formed VI Corps, which took part in the Battle of Loos in September. In December VI Corps was attacked by the Imperial German Army with phosgene gas, the first time this form of chemical warfare was used. In January 1916 Keir was promoted to the substantive rank of lieutenant general "for distinguished service in the Field".

On 8 August 1916 Keir was relieved of command of VI Corps, whilst the official explanation for the move was given as being due to exhaustion or illness, the real cause was a personal dispute between Keir and General Sir Edmund Allenby, his commanding general at the head of the Third Army. Allenby was notorious for his overbearing command manner with subordinates, and had gained the nickname "the Bull" for his aggression amongst them. Keir had previously protested to General Sir Douglas Haig, commander-in-chief (C-in-C) of the BEF, and as a result had acquired the sobriquet in Third Army of "the Matador" – i.e. the man who could handle "the Bull". However, Allenby later formally raised concerns with Haig about Keir's front-line dispositions of VI Corps in the line around Arras in August 1916, and Haig supported Allenby's assessment that Keir was an indifferent general (augmented by an inherent prejudice that Haig possessed towards older generals, Keir having just turned 60), and despite Keir's threats to Haig to appeal to higher authority against the decision in England if he was deprived of his command in the field and forcefully returned home, protesting that he had been wronged by Allenby's action, Haig removed him thence.

On return to England Keir was side-lined and without a command, and spent the remainder of the war fulminating about the role of privileged "cavalry generals" (such as Haig and Allenby), who he argued held a disproportionate number of senior posts in the BEF compared to infantrymen, gunners and engineers.

== Later life ==
Keir was formally retired from the British Army in July 1918, and wrote and published a book detailing his thoughts for the post-war future of the British Army, entitled A Soldier's-Eye View (1919). In it he called for "a true National army", alongside reforms to create a "National church". His suggested reforms included cutting the size of the peace-time regular forces, alongside significant reductions in cavalry forces, and reorganising the home and colonial forces for better efficiency. More unusually, he also anticipated strong government control of labour in all spheres – a "national plan of personal service to the state" – and the creation of an "Army Senate" to oversee the organisation and governance of the National Army. The Senate would have both peacetime and wartime roles, and could serve as an advisory body akin to the War Cabinet during wartime. In retirement, he served as a Deputy Lieutenant and Justice of the Peace for Warwickshire.

== Death ==
Keir died at Leamington Spa in the county of Warwickshire, on 3 May 1937, at the age of 80.

== Awards ==
As well as his knighthood, which he had received with his promotion in 1915, he was awarded the Medaille Militare and appointed a Grand Officer of the Belgian Order of the Crown.

== Notes ==
Military offices
Preceded by Alexander Thorneycroft	GOC South Midland Division; 1912–1914	Succeeded by Edward Graham
Preceded by William Pulteney	GOC 6th Division; 1914–1915	Succeeded by Walter Congreve
New post	GOC VI Corps; 1915–1916	Succeeded by Aylmer Haldane
