= 97 Battery (Lawson's Company) Royal Artillery =

Artillery battery of the British Army

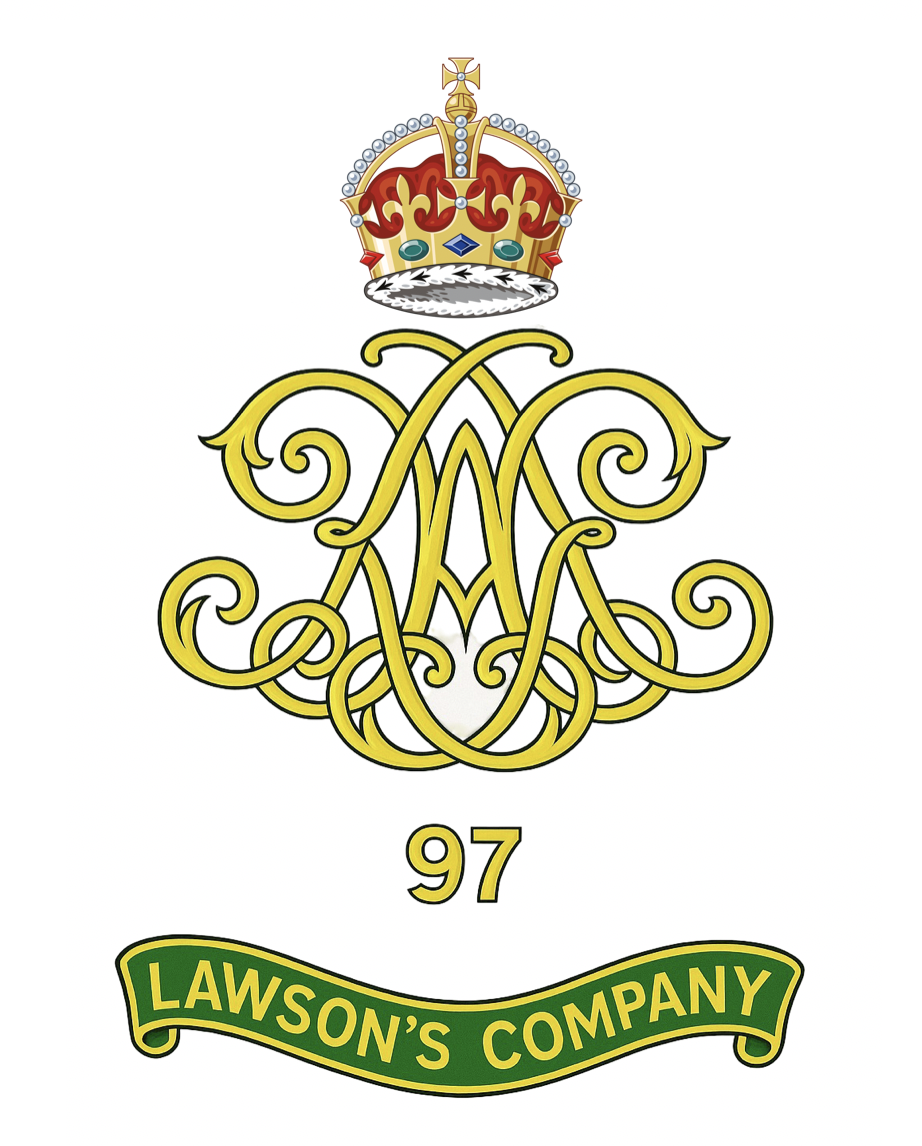
- Active: 1803 – present
- Country: United Kingdom
- Branch: British Army
- Type: Artillery
- Role: Field Artillery
- Size: Artillery battery
- Part of: 4th Regiment Royal Artillery
- Garrison/HQ: Alanbrooke Barracks, Topcliffe
- Nickname: Lawson's
- Patron: Saint Barbara
- Colors: Green & Gold
- Anniversaries: 13 September (Formation); 21 June (Battle of Vitoria)
- Engagements: Peninsular War -Battle of Roliça -Battle of Vimiera -Capture of Porto -Battle of Talavera -Battle of Bussaco -Torres Vedras -Battle of Fuentes de Oñoro -Siege of Ciudad Rodrigo -Battle of Salamanca -Siege of Burgos -Battle of Vittoria -Siege of San Sebastián -Battle of the Bidassoa -Battle of Nivelle Boer War (South Africa); First World War; Second World War; Operation Musketeer (Suez Crisis); Operation Claret (Indonesia–Malaysia confrontation); Operation Banner (Northern Ireland); Operation Corporate(Falklands War); Operation Tosca (Cyprus); Operation Telic (Iraq); Operation Herrick (Afghanistan)
- Battle honours: Battle of Vitoria (the title given is Lawson's Company for its commander at the time)

Commanders
- Notable commanders: Captain Robert Lawson RA

97 Battery (Lawson's Company) Royal Artillery was formed on 13 September 1803 as Captain H. Douglas's Company, 8th Battalion Royal Artillery and is currently a tac battery within 4th Regiment Royal Artillery based in Alanbrooke Barracks, Topcliffe, North Yorkshire. The battery was until recently a gun battery but was reduced to a tactical or tac battery in 2013 following its last operational tour of Afghanistan. It is now one of three tac batteries that call in artillery fire from 4th Regiment Royal Artillery's two remaining gun batteries. The battery has been known by a variety of names during its existence and moved between different Royal Artillery Regiments or Battalions due to reorganisations of the Royal Regiment of Artillery and changes in role. In the First World War it fought as 87th (Howitzer) Battery, Royal Field Artillery.

== History ==
=== Formation and preparation for war ===
The battery was formed in 1803 as part of the newly formed 8th Battalion, Royal Regiment of Artillery during a period of expansion for the regiment. As was the custom at the time each of the battalion's new companies took the name of their company commander. The battery was first known as Captain Douglas's Company and stationed at Woolwich. It remained garrisoned at the Royal Arsenal until November 1805, after which it marched to Exeter and then onto Plymouth in May 1807. Captain T S Hughes then took command of the company for the subsequent embarkation to Gibraltar.

Captain Hughes' command did not last long as he died in Gibraltar on 18 May 1808, and was replaced by Captain Robert Lawson who was dispatched from England. The company was in the process of deploying to war for the first time and before their new commander could arrive and the company was split with half, under command of the 2nd Captain Captain H. T. Fauquier, being ordered to join a British force being sent to fight in Sicily. The remaining part of the company fell under the command of Captain W Morrison, and it was dispatched on the Transport Ship Hornby to Mondego Bay in Portugal as part of the British force being assembled there. The half of the unit sent to Sicily was never to rejoin them and was later absorbed into another Royal Artillery unit.

=== Peninsular War ===
Lawson's Company held the unique record of having been the only Royal Artillery unit to serve throughout the entire Peninsular War, from 1808 until 1814. At least three diaries of unit officers covering this period have survived until the present day, that of Captain Lawson himself, that of Lieutenant Ingilby and finally that of Captain Johnson.

Owing to the shortage of draught horses and stores, it was found impossible to equip this half company, so the 6-pounders were left in the stores at Mondego Bay. The officers and men made amends with some captured enemy pieces with the army advancing against the French towards Lisbon. The Company took part in the famous crossing of the Douro river, the capture of Porto, the pursuit of Marshal Soult's army to Braga and the desperate fight at the Battle of Talavera. On 27 and 28 July, during this battle the 2nd Captain, Taylor, was severely wounded and captured.

In the winter of 1809, the unit was based at Badajoz, however, the next year the Battery accompanied the now Lord Wellington in his campaign, which included the encounter at the Battle of Bussaco and also the retreat of the Lines of Torres Vedras. In 1811, Lawson advanced the company from the Lines and saw action at the Battle of Fuentes de Oñoro in May 1811. The battery was replenished six months later with 6-pounders, and fought a hard battle at Salamanca, suffering casualties whilst in action, and at the Siege of Burgos, before the retreat to Portugal. At the commencement of the 1813 campaign, Lawson's Company was part of the 6th Division.

During the advance of the Army that summer, it was alternatively with the 5th Division at the battle of Vittoria. The battery took part in the Siege of San Sebastián where Capt Johnson and a number of men from the unit were sent into the breach with the infantry in order to seize enemy artillery pieces. Capt Johnson's diary provides graphic details of this action. Lawson's Company – then equipped with 9-pounders – took part in the Passage of Bidassoa in October 1813, and in the battle of Nivelle. 2nd Captain Mosse was in command of the company when it repulsed the French attacks on 10 and 11 December. Captain Robert Lawson's Company, 8th Battalion Royal Artillery, left Spain on 22 July 1814 on board HMS Hydra bound for Plymouth.

=== General duties 19th century ===
The post war period was a quiet one for the company. The company was not sent overseas to fight at the Waterloo, but moved in 1821 to Gibraltar and later to Corfu, then part of the British governed United States of the Ionian Islands. It was based there during the Greek War of Independence and a period of tense relations with the Ottoman Empire which lead to a number of engagements at sea in the area. The company afterwards was stationed at Woolwich, Leith, Bermuda, Ireland and Ceylon, before returning to Woolwich in 1856. On the introduction of the brigade system, the company was converted into a field battery as 'H' Battery, 8 Brigade in 1861. It then went to India in 1867.

Ten years later, the Company became 'H' Battery, 3 Brigade Royal Artillery, and in 1884 was converted into a Depot Field Battery for 3 Brigade Royal Field Artillery at Hilsea. Only later, in 1895, did the Company recover its status as a service battery under the designation of 87 Field Battery Royal Artillery. The battery was deploy to South Africa for the Boer War in December 1900 and saw action Eastern Transvaal mostly in sections or single guns working with small mobile columns. In 1914 the Battery – then equipped as a howitzer battery and based in Ireland – was deployed to France again with XII (12th) Brigade.

=== World War I ===
Known as 87 Battery Royal Field Artillery, and based in Ireland, when the First World War broke out the battery were immediately mobilised along with the rest of 12th (Howitzer) Brigade Royal Field Artillery, under the 6th Division. It spent the war fighting in the relatively small battlefields of France and Belgium, in extremely poor conditions in the trenches of the First Battle of the Aisne, Somme, Ypres, Cambrai and the Hindenburg Line. During the Battle of Aisne, the battery fired throughout the day and night for 48 hours in the Aisne heights. A month later, the Battle of Armentières began. In August 1915, the battery saw action at the Battle of Hooge. The battery then moved to fight in the Somme. In May 1916, 87 Battery was transferred from the 12th (Howitzer) Brigade, Royal Field Artillery to the 2nd Brigade, Royal Field Artillery. The Battery split again, one section was peeled off to form D Howitzer Battery after joining with another section from 43 Howitzer Battery. The Battery then fought in the Battle of the Somme on 15 September 1916 to the end on 22 April 1917.

Between 23 and 28 November, the battery supported units in the Capture of Bourbu Wood and continued to engage throughout the German counterattack from 30 November until 3 December. Between 21 and 22 March 1918, the battery returned to the Somme and helped win a crushing defeat on the Kaiser's army at the Battle of St. Quentin (1918). From there, it moved onto the Battle of the Lys, which started on 13 April. On 18 September, it moved to engage the enemy at the Battle of Épehy, and then to the Battle of St Quentin Canal on 24–30 September. It saw further action in the second Battle of Cambrai (1918), and what was to become known as the Battle of the Hindenburg Line, fighting with the Fourth Army, in the IX (9) Corps as part of 2nd Brigade Royal Field Artillery. 87 Field Battery took part in the Final Advance in Picardy, notably at the Battle of the Selle from 17 to 25 October 1918. During the war the battery was an early adopter of air land integration; working on several occasions with 6 Squadron Royal Flying Corps (now No. 6 Squadron RAF) who would support artillery spotting.

=== The Irish War of Independence ===
The battery returned to their barracks in Ireland just as the Irish War of Independence broke out and were involved in fighting the rebels as part of flying columns. At the end the conflict, it returned to the British mainland. In 1926, the Royal Field Artillery (RFA) branch of the Royal Artillery was amalgamated with the Royal Garrison Artillery (RGA) branch. As a result, all RFA and RGA battery's simply became Royal Artillery battery's. In the same year the battery applied for the honour title 'Lawson's Company' in recognition of its heroism and service during the Peninsular War. This was granted by order 20/Arty/4544/AG6a on 18 Oct 1926 and the battery was from then on known as 87 Battery (Lawson's Company) Royal Artillery.

=== World War II ===
Between 1939 and 1940, the battery was in France as part of I Corps with the new 25-pounder guns. It was evacuated from Dunkirk on HMS Worcester, having destroyed the guns and handed over all ammunition and rifles. It was then in the UK from 1940 to 1942, before returning to campaign service in North Africa with General Montgomery in 1943. Between 1944 and 1945, the battery was in action in Tunisia and Italy, in support of 31 infantry brigade, during the Anzio bridgehead and the push north through Florence towards Bologna. During the batteries service in Italy it again saw service with No. 6 Squadron RAF with whom the battery had served during the first world war.

=== Post war ===
On 1 May 1947, the Battery was renumbered 97 Battery as part of a wider reorganisation of the Royal Regiment of Artillery. All Royal Artillery Batteries were renumbered in accordance with their seniority in the Royal Artillery as part of a postwar rationalisation. The Battery became an Airborne unit and was known as 97 (Lawson's Company) Airborne Light Battery. The Battery formed part of 33 Airborne Light Regiment and deployed on internal security duty in Palestine until the spring of 1948 when it was stationed at Flensburg later joined the rest of the Regiment at Fallingbostel.

=== Suez Conflict ===
Lawson's Company was loaded onto the transport ship HMS Theseus, deploying to Cyprus in preparation for operations as part of the Suez Crisis. Once in Cyprus the battery commander's party, with the regiments commanding officer and his tactical group, left Nicosia flying out on a de Havilland aircraft and parachuting onto Gamil Airfield at the start of the action between 4 and 5 November 1956. The rest of the battery was loaded onto a Landing Ship Logistics (LSL) and transport ships and sailed for Port Said at the same time. The Battery was recovered to Cyprus at the end of the Suez Crisis and took part in operations against the EOKA terror group in Cyprus.

=== 1960s and 70s ===
The battery moved back to Aldershot. where it stayed until 1961, and occasionally deployed to Cyprus, Jordan and Hong Kong. The Battery was also based in Bulford before taking part in the Borneo campaign around 1 April 1965. In 1971, the battery deployed to Derry, and suffered a number of casualties due to shootings and bombings by the Provisional Irish Republican Army. A year later, Lawson's Company returned to Northern Ireland based at the Long Kesh prison and surrounding area. During this tour, three soldiers were seriously injured, and one killed as a result of a direct mortar hit on an OP hangar. It stayed there until 1977 and later replaced 7th Regiment Royal Horse Artillery as the artillery Regiment supporting the Airborne Brigade. The battery was formally affiliated to No. 6 Squadron RAF during this period as a result the batteries historic service with the squadron during the first and second world wars. No. 6 Squadron RAF, as a result of their cooperation had long held the motto 'the eyes of the Army' and still to this day carry a 'Gunner Stripe' featuring the Royal Artillery's Zig Zag motif on their aircraft.

=== Falklands Campaign ===
The Battery set sail with 4th Regiment Royal Artillery to the Falklands on board the QE II alongside 3/29 (Corunna) Battery Royal Artillery. The Battery cross-decked to the P&O Cruiser SS Canberra and sailed for Port San Carlos, inside the Falkland Sound, arriving 2 June 1982. The battery served with 4th Brigade throughout the conflict.

=== 1990s ===
The battery remained in Aldershot after the Falklands War. It then shifted to Osnabrück Germany, re-rolling from their airborne artillery role to a heavy artillery unit. The unit later augmented 4th Royal Tank Regiment in Cyprus and undertook a further tour of Northern Ireland at Middletown and Keady. The battery also carried out exchange deployments with the French 1er Régiment d'Artillerie de Marine and sent detachments to support other batteries during the regiment's Operation Banner deployment to Belfast in 1994.

In 1997, the unit was ordered to Bosnia and Herzegovina to help stabilise the peace established by the Dayton Agreement. Lawson's deployed as a battery group with a troop from 88 (Arracan) Battery Royal Artillery to Sanski Most Coal Mine, to provide the SFOR commander with offensive fire support with their AS90 self-propelled 155 mm guns.

=== Iraq and Afghanistan ===
During Operation TELIC and Operation HERRICK the battery completed numerous deployments to both Iraq and Afghanistan. During its deployments to Afghanistan it re-rolled from the AS90 to the 105mm Light Gun for each deployment before returning to the AS90 afterwards. This was due to the practical difficulties of deploying the tracked armoured AS90 platform to Afghanistan and the larger calibre of this weapon. Their final deployment to Afghanistan was Operation HERRICK 17 (Oct 2012- Mar 2013) during which the Battery was attached to 1st (Cheshire) Battalion of the Mercian Regiment. The Battery HQ was located at Forward Operating Base Shawqat with the battlegroup HQ with forward observer parties attached to infantry companies in patrol bases across Nad Ali including at Patrol Base Salaang and Patrol Base Wahid. The Gun group were deployed to PB ATTAL in the Gereshk valley. During this deployment British Forces began to withdraw from Afghanistan and the Battery helped to close most of the Patrol Bases in the Nad Ali area, withdrawing back to Camp Bastion and returning to the UK.

=== Post Afghanistan reorganisation ===
Shortly after returning to the UK Lawson's Company celebrated the 200th anniversary of the Battle of Vittoria, taking part in the tercentenary celebrations in Spain which included members from both the Duke of Wellington and Napoleons families. During the same period 4th Regiment Royal Artillery was restructured and re-rolled; converting from an armoured regiment equipped with 3x AS90 and 2x armoured tac batteries to a light role regiment equipped with the 2x 105mm Light gun batteries and 3x light role tac batteries. Lawson's Company was the battery selected to be reduced to a tac battery and its gun group was disbanded at a ceremony which included a fly past by the members of 6 Squadron RAF with which the battery has been associated with since WW1. During this reorganisation the battery also absorbed the regiments TAC Party of Forward Air Controllers (FAC).

== Bibliography ==
- Clarke, W.G. (1993). Horse Gunners: The Royal Horse Artillery, 200 Years of Panache and Professionalism. Woolwich: The Royal Artillery Institution. ISBN 09520762-0-9.
- Laws, M.E.S. (1952). Battery Records of the Royal Artillery 1716–1859. Woolwich: The Royal Artillery Institution. OCLC 2170480.
- Laws, M.E.S. (1970). Battery Records of the Royal Artillery 1859–1877. Woolwich: The Royal Artillery Institution. OCLC 21509290.
- Royal Artillery (2015). Royal Regiment of Artillery; The Blue List 2015. Larkhill: The Royal Regiment of Artillery.
