= VI Corps (United Kingdom) =

WWI British Army formation

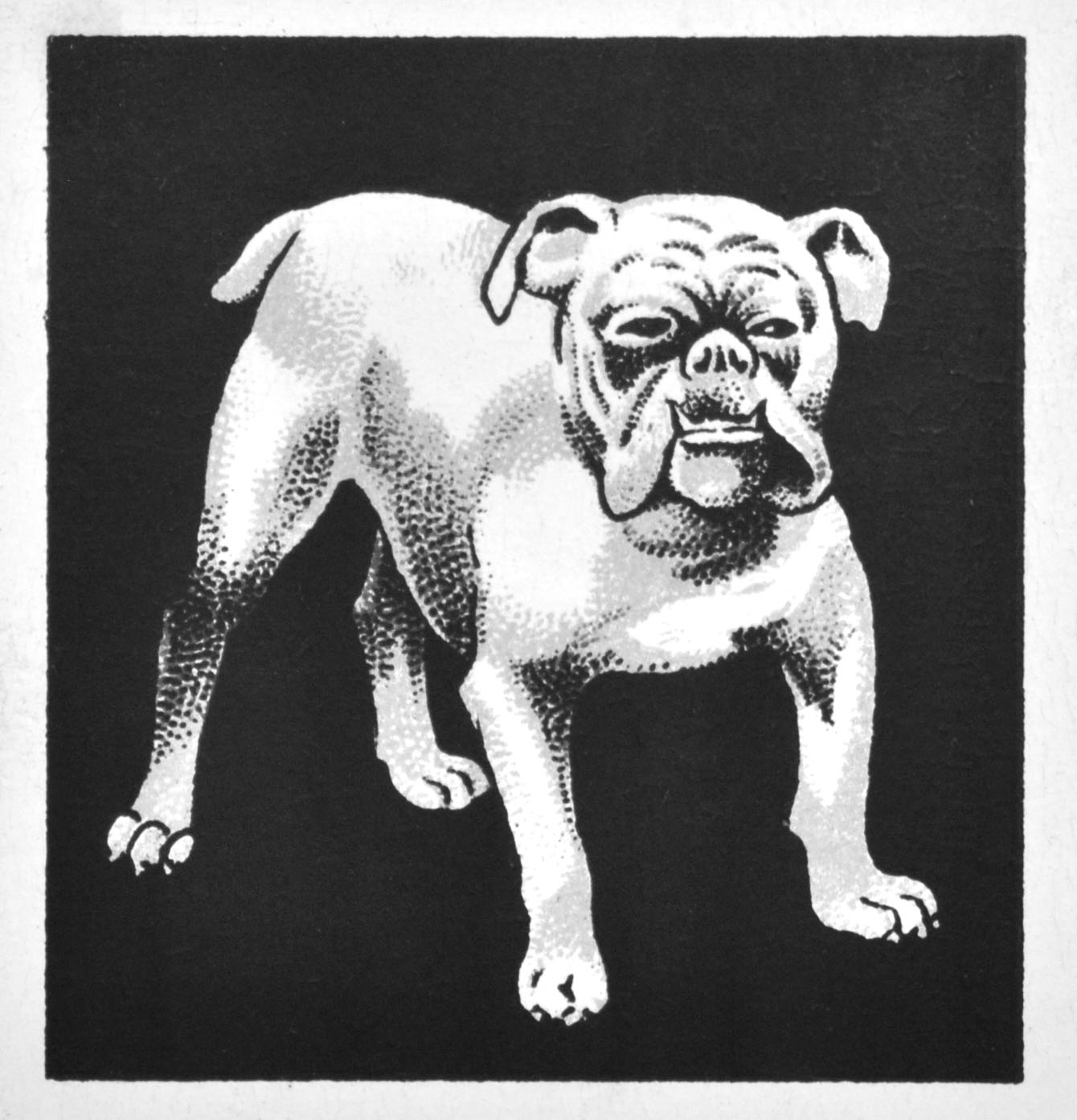
- VI Corps formation badge.
- Active: First World War; 1940
- Country: United Kingdom
- Branch: British Army
- Type: Field corps
- Engagements: First World War: Battle of Loos; Battle of Arras (1917); First Battles of the Somme (1918); Second Battle of the Somme (1918); The Final Advance in Picardy

Commanders
- Notable commanders: Sir John Keir; Sir Aylmer Haldane

VI Corps was an army corps of the British Army in the First World War. It was first organised in June 1915 and fought throughout on the Western Front. It was briefly reformed during the Second World War to command forces based in Northern Ireland, but was reorganized as British Forces in Ireland (subsequently British Forces in Northern Ireland) one month later.

== Prior to the First World War ==
In 1876 a Mobilisation Scheme for the forces in Great Britain and Ireland, including eight army corps of the 'Active Army', was published. The '6th Corps' was headquartered at Chester, composed primarily of militia, and in 1880 comprised:

- 1st Division (Chester)
  - 1st Brigade (Chester)
    - Royal Denbigh and Merioneth Rifles (Wrexham), 1st Cheshire Militia (Chester), Royal Montgomeryshire Rifles (Welchpool)
  - 2nd Brigade (Chester)
    - Clare Militia (Enniskillen), Royal Flint Rifles (Mold), Carnarvon Militia (Caernarfon)
  - Divisional Troops
    - Cheshire Yeomanry (Chester)
- 2nd Division (Liverpool)
  - 1st Brigade (Liverpool)
    - Dublin City Militia (Dublin), 2nd Royal Lancashire Militia (Liverpool), Roscommon Militia (Boyle)
  - 2nd Brigade (Liverpool)
    - King's Own (1st Staffordshire) Militia (Lichfield), King's Own (2nd Staffordshire) Light Infantry Militia (Stafford), King's Own (3rd Staffordshire) Rifle Militia (Newcastle-under-Lyme)
  - Divisional Troops
    - 2nd Bn. 20th Foot (Mullingar), Lancashire Hussars (Ashton in Makerfield)
- 3rd Division (Manchester)
  - 1st Brigade (Manchester)
    - 1st Derby Militia (Derby), 2nd Derby Militia (Chesterfield), 2nd Cheshire Militia (Macclesfield)
  - 2nd Brigade (Preston)
    - 1st Royal Lancashire Militia (Lancaster), 3rd Royal Lancashire Militia (Preston), 4th Royal Lancashire Militia (Warrington)
  - Divisional Troops
    - 1st Bn. 11th Foot (Manchester), Duke of Lancaster's Own Yeomanry (Worsley)
- Cavalry Brigade (Crewe)
  - Denbighshire Yeomanry (Ruthin), Derbyshire Yeomanry (Derby), Worcestershire Yeomanry (Worcester)

This scheme had been dropped by 1881. The 1901 Army Estimates (introduced by St John Brodrick when Secretary of State for War) allowed for six army corps based on the six regional commands: 'Sixth Army Corps' was to be formed by Scottish Command with headquarters in Edinburgh. It was to comprise 3 regiments of Imperial Yeomanry, 26 artillery batteries (17 Regular, 6 Militia and 3 Volunteer) and 25 infantry battalions (2 Regular, 13 Militia and 10 Volunteers). Under Army Order No 38 of 1907 the corps titles disappeared.

== First World War ==
=== Operations around Ypres ===
VI Corps was organised within Sir Herbert Plumer's Second Army of the British Expeditionary Force on 1 June 1915. It was placed under the command of Lt-Gen Sir John Lindesay Keir, promoted from command of 6th Division. Initially it comprised 4th Division from V Corps and 6th Division from III Corps, and it took over the left of the British line at Ypres.

VI Corps cooperated with the attack by its neighbour V Corps on Bellewaarde Ridge on 16 June 1915 with rifle and artillery fire, and in July and August 1915 it was engaged in trench fighting round Hooge Chateau. The corps was first seriously engaged in the Second Battle of Bellewaarde, a subsidiary attack to assist First Army's attack at Loos on 18 September 1915.

=== Phosgene attack ===
Before dawn on 19 December 1915 VI Corps was the victim of the first German attack with phosgene gas. It had the 6th Division and 49th Division holding the line and 14th (Light) Division in reserve. The attack was made by the German XXVI Reserve Corps between the Roulers and Staden railways, NW of Ypres. The attack was designed to test new weapons (the gas released was an 80:20 mixture of chlorine and phosgene) and to inflict casualties. There was some shelling, but apart from sending out infantry and air patrols to gauge the effectiveness of the gas cloud, the Germans made no attempt to advance. VI Corps' anti-gas measures were reasonably effective, and a pre-arranged counter-barrage of shrapnel shells discouraged the enemy patrols. The British reserves stood to, but were not required. A total of 1069 gas casualties (120 fatal) were suffered, three-quarters by 49th Division.

=== 1916 ===
In early 1916 the expanding BEF was reorganised, and VI Corps became part of Sir Edmund Allenby's Third Army in the Arras sector, with which it remained until the Armistice.

'Order of Battle of VI Corps March 1916
General Officer Commanding: Lieutenant-General Sir John Keir

- 5th Division
- 14th (Light) Division
- 56th (1/1st London) Division)

Later in the year, VI Corps was taken over by Lt-Gen J.A.L. (later Sir Aylmer) Haldane, promoted from command of 3rd Division, who remained in command until the end of the war.

=== Arras Offensive ===
In the Spring of 1917 VI Corps took part in Third Army's Arras Offensive. During the phase known as the First Battle of the Scarpe (9–14 April), 37th Division of VI Corps captured Monchy-le-Preux. During the Second Battle of the Scarpe (23–24 April), 15th (Scottish) Division captured Guemappe.

Order of Battle of VI Corps April 1917
GOC: Lt-Gen Aylmer Haldane

- 3rd Division
- 12th (Eastern) Division
- 15th (Scottish) Division
- 17th (Northern) Division
- 29th Division
- 37th Division

For the Battle of Arleux (28–29 April) VI Corps only had 3rd and 12th (Eastern) Divisions in the line, but 56th (1/1st London) Division was added for the Third Battle of the Scarpe (3–4 May). 3rd and 12th Eastern) Divisions took Roeux (13–14 May), which brought it up to the Drocourt-Queant Switch Line (part of the Hindenburg Line defences) and completed VI Corps' participation in the offensive.

=== The German counter-offensive ===
VI Corps fought in the Battle of St Quentin (21–23 March), and the First Battle of Bapaume (24–25 March), the opening phases of the German 1918 Spring Offensive (Operation Michael), otherwise known as the 'First Battles of the Somme 1918'.

Order of Battle of VI Corps March 1918
GOC: Lieutenant-General Sir Aylmer Haldane

- Guards Division
- 3rd Division
- 31st Division
- 34th Division
- 40th Division
- 59th (2nd North Midland) Division
- 42nd (East Lancashire) Division - replaced 34th Division at Bapaume.

By the end of the month, VI Corps was back where it had been a year earlier, fighting a new Battle of Arras on 28 March. For this action Haldane had 2nd Canadian Division and 97th Brigade of 32nd Division under command, as well as Guards, 3rd and 31st Divisions. 32nd Division took part in the Battle of the Ancre on 5 April.

=== The Hundred Days ===
During the Second Battles of the Somme in August 1918, VI Corps attacked at Albert (21–23 August).

Order of Battle of VI Corps August 1918
GOC: Lt-Gen Aylmer Haldane

- Guards Division
- 2nd Division
- 3rd Division
- 52nd (Lowland) Division
- 56th (1/1st London) Division
- 59th (2nd North Midland) Division

For the Second Battle of Bapaume (31 August – 3 September) and the subsequent Allied attacks during September 1918, VI Corps had Guards, 2nd, 3rd, and 62nd (2nd West Riding) Divisions under command. During the Final Advance in Picardy, VI Corps fought in the Battle of the Selle (17–25 October) and the Battle of the Sambre (4 November).

German resistance was now crumbling, and the Allied advance had become a pursuit. During the night of 8/9 November, the reserve of Guards Division, 3rd Battalion Grenadier Guards, was pushed ahead through a black night with its machine guns on pack mules to seize the citadel of the old French frontier fortress of Maubeuge, which the Germans had captured after a siege in 1914. The main German defence line was now seven miles away. By 11 November when the Armistice came into effect, the 62nd and Guards Divisions were the advance guard of Third Army, but were doing no more than pushing forward infantry outposts and cyclist patrols against the dissolving German forces. VI Corps was among Allied troops that advanced into the Rhineland after the Armistice.

== Second World War ==
In June 1940, following the Allied defeat in the Second World War's Battle of France, the British Army proceeded to reorganise their forces throughout the UK. In mid-June VI Corps was formed to command all British troops based in Northern Ireland. On 12 July, the corps ceased to exist, and its headquarters was used to form British Troops in Ireland (by the end of the year, the command had been renamed British Troops in Northern Ireland or BTNI). This command supplemented the existing Northern Ireland District, which was made responsible for local defence while BTNI would launch counterattacks against any German invasion of the territory or would spearhead an advance into the Republic of Ireland if the Germans invaded.

== General Officers Commanding ==
Commanders have been:

- June 1915 – August 1916 Lieutenant-General John Keir
- August 1916 – 1919 Lieutenant-General Aylmer Haldane
- 1940 Lieutenant-General Hubert Huddleston

== Trivia ==
In July 1918, the sculptor John Tweed, who had failed to gain employment as an official war artist, was commissioned by General Jan Smuts to travel to France and prepare designs for a proposed South African War Memorial. Tweed knew Haldane, who had raised the money for Tweed's sculpture of Lt-Gen Sir John Moore at Shorncliffe, and Haldane offered the sculptor facilities with VI Corps HQ. Tweed spent the last five months of the war as a civilian member of the corps staff, and accompanied the troops into the Rhineland. Although one of Tweed's studies entitled Attack was exhibited, the ambitious architectural monument that he designed for South Africa was never executed.
