= Aylmer Haldane =

British Army general (1862–1950)

General Sir Aylmer Haldane GCMG KCB DSO
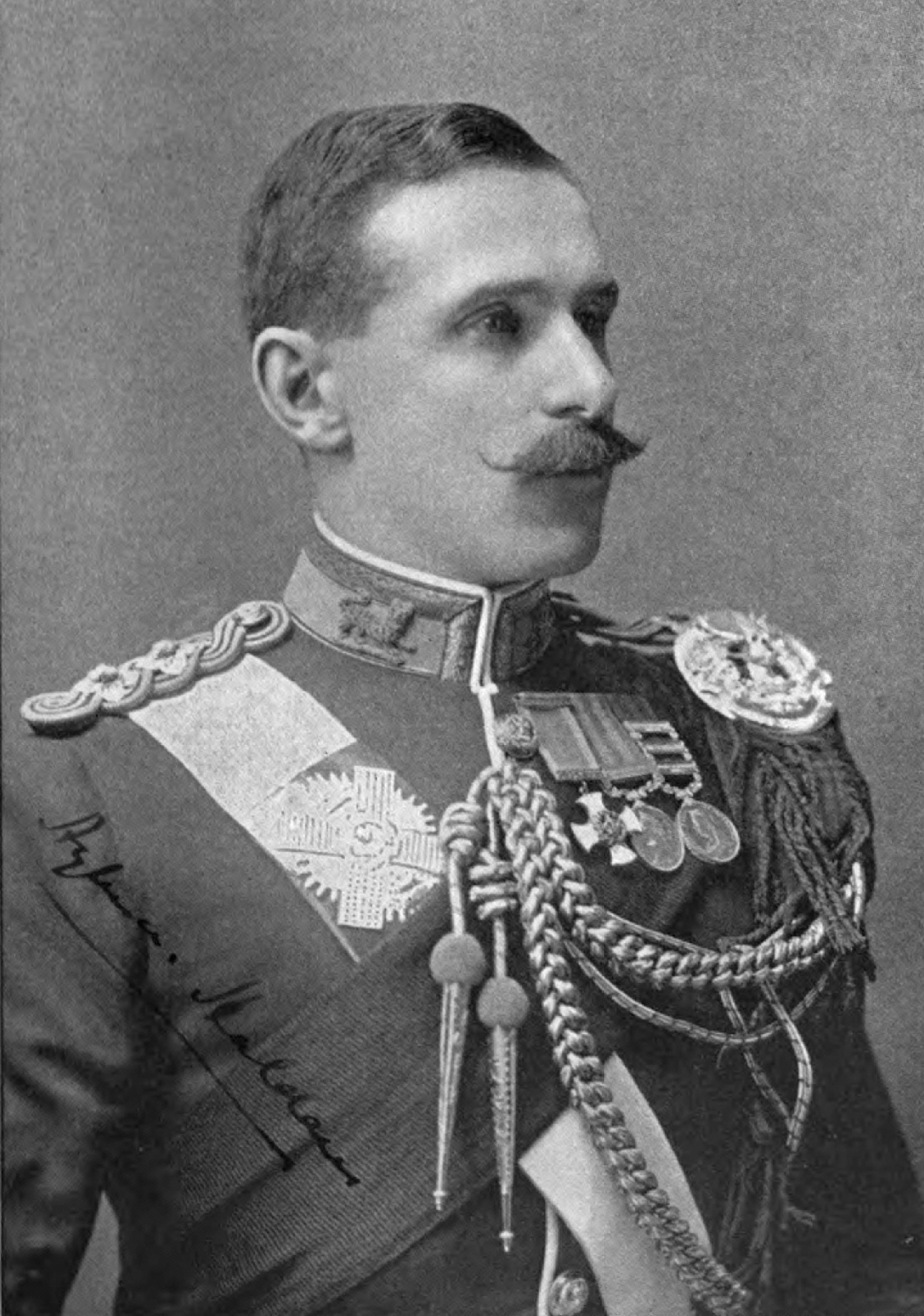
- Haldane in c. 1900
- Born: 17 November 1862; Gleneagles, Scotland
- Died: 19 April 1950 (aged 87); London, England
- Burial place: Brookwood Cemetery
- Military career
- Branch: British Army
- Service years: 1882–1925
- Rank: General
- Unit: Gordon Highlanders
- Commands: 10th Infantry Brigade; 3rd Division; 6th Army Corps
- Conflicts: North West Frontier; Second Boer War; Russo-Japanese War (Military Attaché); World War I; Iraqi Revolt
- Awards: Knight Grand Cross of the Order of St Michael and St George; Knight Commander of the Order of the Bath; Distinguished Service Order

General Sir James Aylmer Lowthorpe Haldane, GCMG, KCB, DSO (17 November 1862 – 19 April 1950) was an officer who rose to high rank in the British Army.

== Early life ==
Born to the physician Daniel Rutherford Haldane and his wife Charlotte Elizabeth née Lowthorpe, James Aylmer Lowthorpe Haldane came from a family of distinguished aristocrats based in Gleneagles. He was a cousin to Richard Haldane, 1st Viscount Haldane, Secretary of State for War 1905–1912, instigator of the Haldane Reforms.

== Early military career ==
In September 1882, after attending the Edinburgh Academy and the Royal Military College, Sandhurst, Haldane was commissioned as a second lieutenant of the Gordon Highlanders. On 18 February 1886, he was promoted to the rank of lieutenant, and, after being made an adjutant in September 1888,

He attended the Staff College, Camberley, from 1892 to 1893. While there he was on 8 April 1892 promoted to the rank of captain.

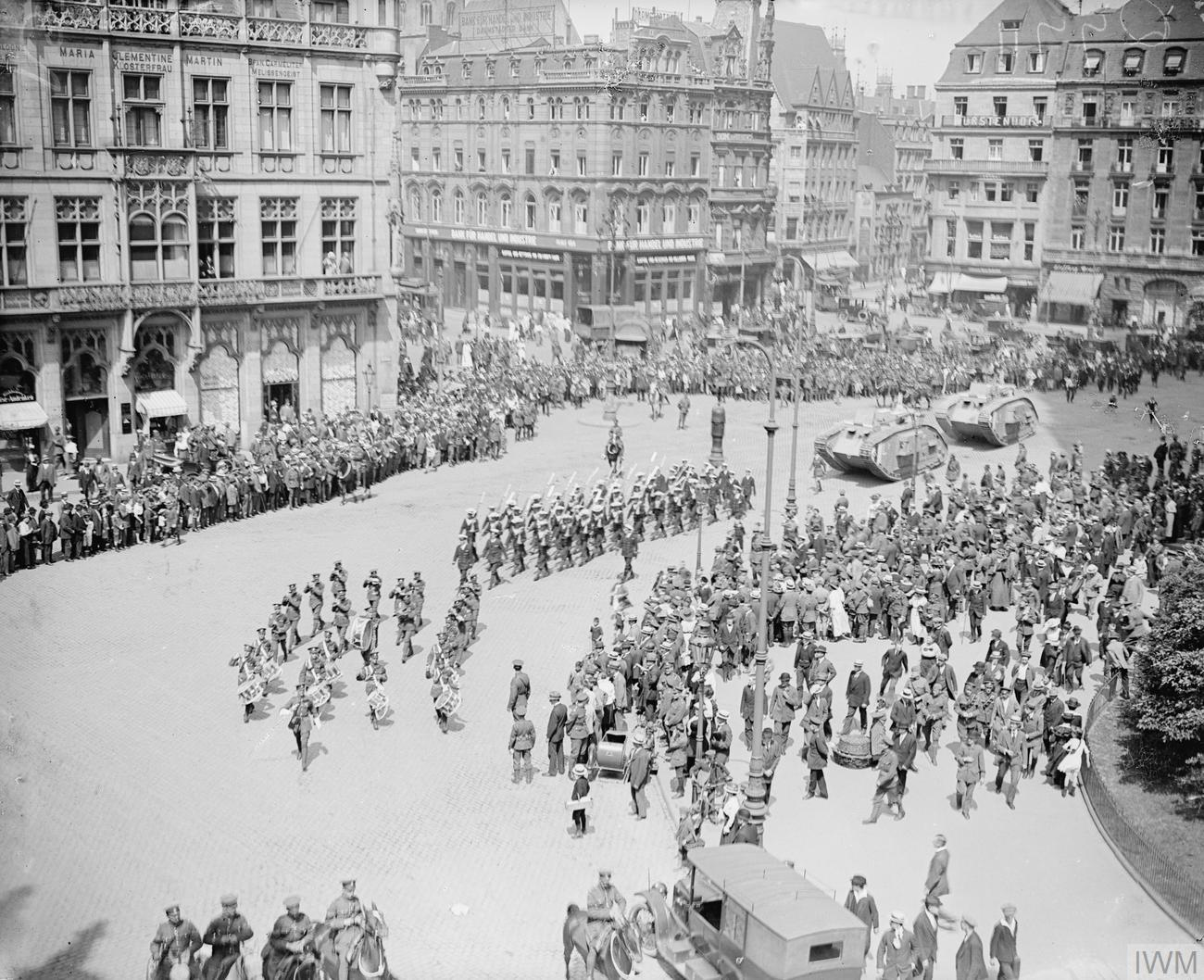
Two tanks passing through Cologne, Germany for inspection by the GOC VI Corps, Lieutenant General Sir Aylmer Haldane, June 1919.

Between 1894 and 1895, Haldane was part of the Waziristan Field Force and participated in the Chitral Expedition. In April 1896 he became aide-de-camp to General Sir William Lockhart, Commander-in-Chief in India. He was dispatched to quell the Afridis rebellion in the Tirah campaign for the next two years (1897–1898) and was appointed a Companion of the Distinguished Service Order (DSO) on 20 May 1898.

Haldane fought in the Second Boer War, which began in October 1899, in South Africa, where he was taken as a prisoner of war. While imprisoned in Pretoria, he planned the escape which made Winston Churchill famous. Haldane failed to escape at the same time and later complained of Churchill's lack of regard for those who should have escaped with him. However, Haldane later managed his own escape.

Haldane was appointed a staff captain in the intelligence section at the War Office on 27 June 1901, promoted to major on 23 July 1902, and received the brevet rank of lieutenant colonel on the following day. He was made a deputy assistant quartermaster general at the War Office in July 1903 and became a military attaché with the Imperial Japanese Army from July 1904 to September 1905 during the Russo-Japanese War, and accompanied Japanese forces into Manchuria.

Following his promotion to brevet colonel in January 1906, Haldane was appointed Companion of the Bath on 16 March 1906 and granted the substantive rank of colonel on 29 October 1906 at the same time as he took over the post of assistant director at headquarters from Brevet Colonel Francis Davies. From 1906 to 1909, he served as assistant director of military intelligence. On 1 October 1909, Haldane was made a brigadier general, general staff (BGGS) at Eastern Command and was promoted to temporary brigadier general while employed in this position, taking over from Brigadier General Thomas Snow.

In May 1912 he became general officer commanding (GOC) of the 4th Division's 10th Infantry Brigade, in succession to Colonel Edward Montagu-Stuart-Wortley and he was allowed to retain his temporary rank while in command of the brigade.

== First World War ==
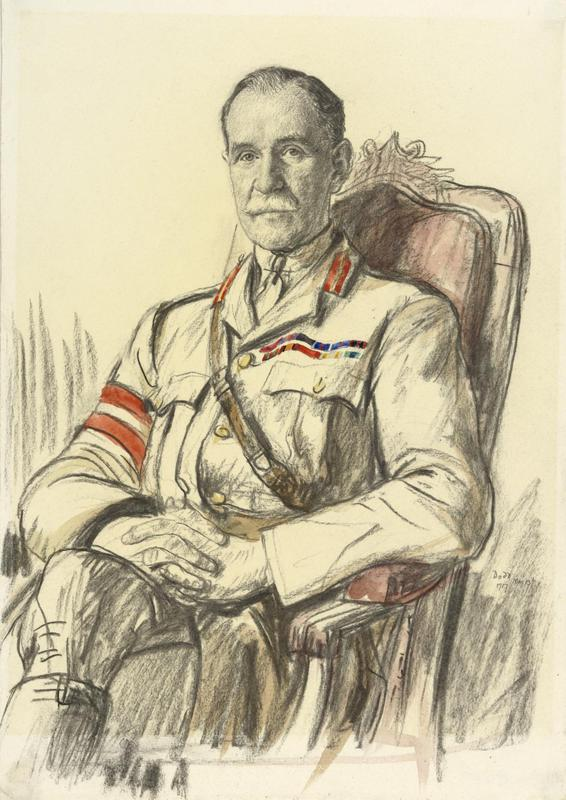
A wartime sketch of Haldane.

In August 1914, after the British entry into World War I, Haldane deployed to France at the head of his brigade, seeing action with most of the rest of the British Expeditionary Force (BEF) during the Retreat from Mons and the Battle of Le Cateau. His leadership during the subsequent battles of the Marne and the Aisne, along with the early stages of the First Battle of Ypres, earned him a promotion to major general that October for "distinguished conduct in the field" but he was not immediately assigned command of a division, instead remaining as GOC of his brigade.

Major General Hubert Hamilton, GOC 3rd Division (and a fellow student of Haldane's at the Staff College over twenty years earlier), became the first British divisional commander to be killed in the war when he lost his life on 14 October. He was succeeded as GOC by Major General Colin Mackenzie although he was soon removed, to be replaced temporarily by Major General Frederick Wing. Haldane was then formally appointed as GOC on 5 November, though this was later rectified to 21 November when he actually took command, making him the division's fourth commander in just over five weeks and "one of the first Brigadiers [of the BEF] to receive a Division." Norman McMahon and later Charles Hull succeeded him as GOC of his brigade.

He led the division through the final weeks of the year and throughout 1915 during the Second Battle of Ypres in April–May, including the First Attack on Bellewaerde in June and the actions at Hooge in July and August. In September, the division carried out a secondary attack at Bellewaerde to support the Battle of Loos.

The next major engagement for Haldane and his division occurred in March 1916 during the actions of St Eloi Craters. This was followed by the Battle of the Somme, which began on 1 July, where the division was "brilliantly successful, carrying Bazentin le Grand, and sharing afterwards in the desperate fighting around Longueval and Delville Wood".

Having now commanded the division for nearly twenty one months, Haldane was promoted to the temporary rank of lieutenant general in August and succeeded Lieutenant General John Keir as GOC of VI Corps, while Cyril Deverell later a field marshal, became GOC 3rd Division in Haldane's place. He held this command for the remainder of the war, notably during the Battle of Arras, "when, advancing due east of the city, its three divisions captured all their objectives, including such formidable fortresses as the Harp and Railway Triangle, and made record captures of prisoners and guns". The next major battle for Haldane's corps came during the German spring offensives almost a year later, followed by the Hundred Days Offensive, when his men helped break through the Hindenburg Line, until the Armistice of 11 November 1918 brought an end to hostilities.

== Post-war ==
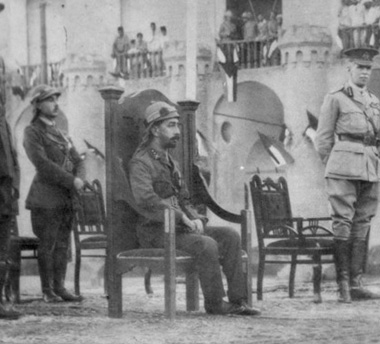
Coronation of Faisal as King of Iraq. Faisal seated, to his right are British High commissioner Percy Cox and Lieutenant Kinahan Cornwallis, to his left commander-in-chief of all British troops in the Mesopotamia Commander General Aylmer Haldane.

After the war, Haldane, his rank of lieutenant general being made substantive in January 1919, was appointed GOC Mesopotamia in 1920 and remained in that post until 1922. After being promoted to full general in March, he retired later in the year.

== Death ==
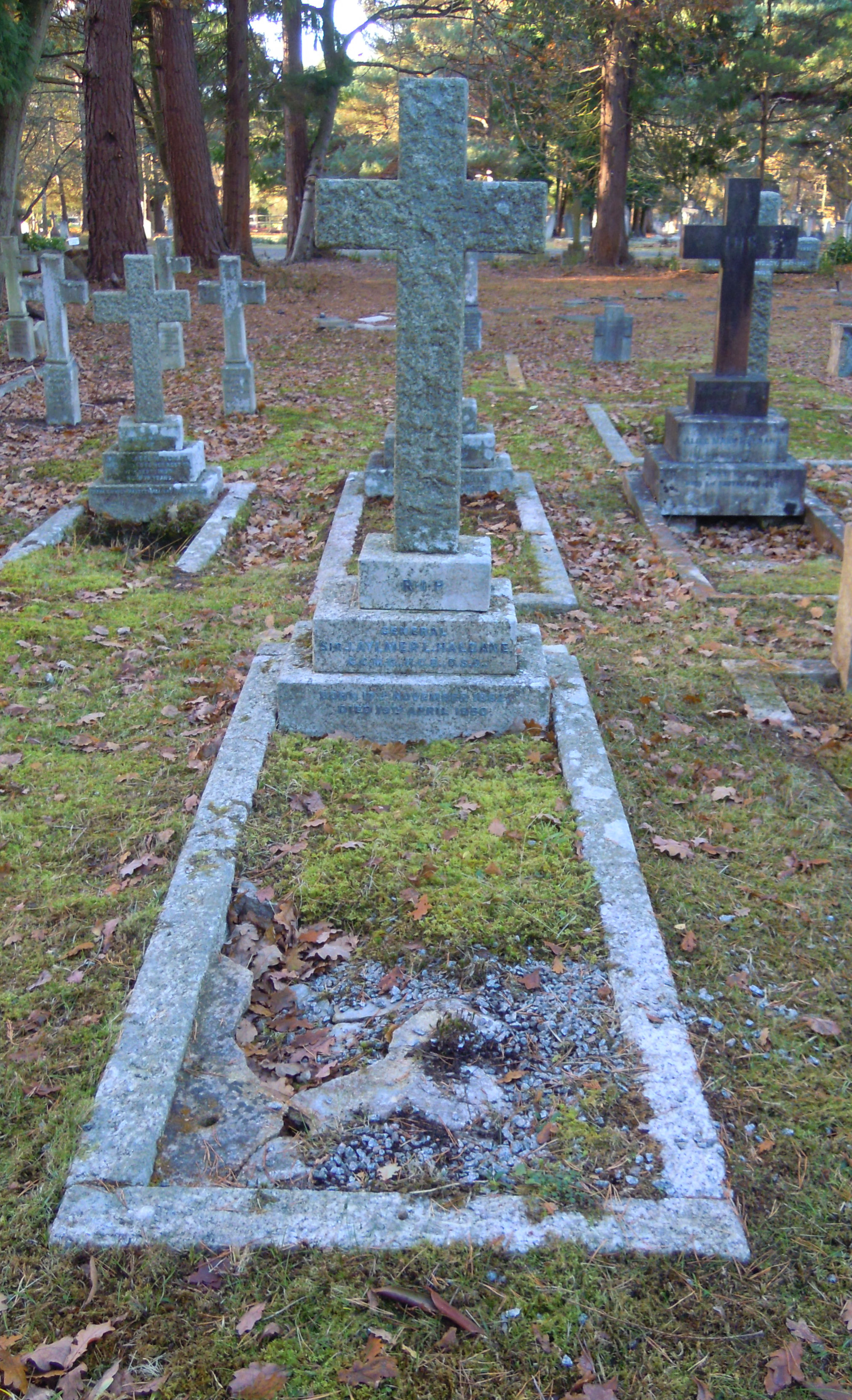
Aylmer Haldane's grave in Brookwood Cemetery.

Haldane died in his 88th year on 19 April 1950 at his home in London, his body was buried at Brookwood Cemetery, in Surrey.

== Honours and decorations ==
- Order of the Sacred Treasure, Japan, 1905.

== Selected works ==
Haldane's published writings encompass 6 works in 8 publications in 1 language and 311 library holdings.

- How We Escaped from Pretoria. Edinburgh: W. Blackwood. 1901.
- A brigade of the old army, 1914, relating to operations of 10 Infantry Bde, France, Aug–Nov 1914. London: Edward Arnold. 1920.
- The Insurrection in Mesopotamia, 1920. London: W. Blackwood and sons. 1922. Archived from the original on 17 October 2006.
- The Haldanes of Gleneagles. Edinburgh: W. Blackwood. 1929.
- A Soldier's Saga: The Autobiography of General Sir Aylmer Haldane. Edinburgh: W. Blackwood. 1948.

=== Papers ===
- LIDDELL HART CENTRE FOR MILITARY ARCHIVES

The papers of Lt Gen Sir Lawrence Worthington Parsons include letter from Haldane relating to 16 Irish Div 1916; the papers of Brig Sir James Edward Edmonds include 12 letters from Haldane 1905–1935 (ref: Edmonds)

- BRITISH LIBRARY, ORIENTAL AND INDIA OFFICE COLLECTIONS, LONDON

Copy of Haldane's official report, Battle of the Sha-Ho, Second Japanese Army, operations from the 5 September to the 19 October 1904 (ref: 9057.de.2)

- CHURCHILL ARCHIVES CENTRE, CHURCHILL COLLEGE, CAMBRIDGE UNIVERSITY

The papers of Maj Gen Sir Edward Louis Spears include correspondence 1934–1938 (ref: SPRS 1/156)

- IMPERIAL WAR MUSEUM, LONDON

Diary as 10 Bde Commander, Shorncliffe 1912–1914; The papers of FM Sir Henry Hughes Wilson include correspondence with Haldane 1920–1921 (ref: HHW)

- NATIONAL LIBRARY OF SCOTLAND, EDINBURGH

Collection of papers 1890–1950 (ref: MSS 20247-59); including letters and diaries; papers relating to his World War I service; papers relating to Mesopotamia 1920–1922

== See also ==
- Military attachés and observers in the Russo-Japanese War

== Notes ==
Military offices
Preceded by Colin Mackenzie	GOC 3rd Division; 1914–1916	Succeeded by Cyril Deverell
Preceded by John Keir	GOC VI Corps; 1916–1919	Corps disbanded
