= 2nd Brigade, Royal Field Artillery =

II Brigade, Royal Field Artillery was a brigade (Note: The basic organic unit of the Royal Artillery was, and is, the Battery. When grouped together they formed brigades, in the same way that infantry battalions or cavalry regiments were grouped together in brigades. At the outbreak of World War I, a field artillery brigade of headquarters (4 officers, 37 other ranks), three batteries (5 and 193 each), and a brigade ammunition column (4 and 154) had a total strength just under 800 so was broadly comparable to an infantry battalion (just over 1,000) or a cavalry regiment (about 550). Like an infantry battalion, an artillery brigade was usually commanded by a Lieutenant-Colonel. Artillery brigades were redesignated as regiments in 1938.) of the Royal Field Artillery which served in the First World War.

It was originally formed with 21st, 42nd and 53rd Batteries, and attached to 6th Infantry Division. In August 1914 it mobilised and in September was sent to the Continent with the British Expeditionary Force, where it saw service with 6th Division throughout the war. 87th (Howitzer) Battery joined the brigade in May 1916 from 12th (Howitzer) Brigade Royal Field Artillery.
