= 36th Brigade Royal Field Artillery =

XXXVI Brigade, Royal Field Artillery was a brigade (Note: The basic organic unit of the Royal Artillery was, and is, the Battery. When grouped together they formed brigades, in the same way that infantry battalions or cavalry regiments were grouped together in brigades. At the outbreak of World War I, a field artillery brigade of headquarters (4 officers, 37 other ranks), three batteries (5 and 193 each), and a brigade ammunition column (4 and 154) had a total strength just under 800 so was broadly comparable to an infantry battalion (just over 1,000) or a cavalry regiment (about 550). Like an infantry battalion, an artillery brigade was usually commanded by a Lieutenant-Colonel. Artillery brigades were redesignated as regiments in 1938.) of the Royal Field Artillery which served in the First World War.

It was originally formed with 15th, 48th and 71st Batteries, and attached to 2nd Infantry Division. On 4 August 1914 it mobilised at Aldershot and was brought up to strength with reservists and drafts from other units; an Ammunition Column was also formed. It was sent to the Continent with the British Expeditionary Force, disembarking at Boulogne 19 August 1914. It saw service with 2nd Division throughout the war. A howitzer battery was formed in May 1916, from a section of each of 47th (Howitzer) and 56th (Howitzer) Batteries, and designated D Battery.

The officers who landed in France with the Brigade included: 36th Brigade Commander - Lt. Col. Ernest Frederick Hall; Adjutant - Capt. Henry Horne Hulton, Medical officer - Captain Patrick Sampson RAMC, Veterinary Officer - Lt. Robert Ferguson Stirling AVC,

15th Battery: Major Christopher Chevallier Barnes, Major Laurence Godman (vice Capt. E. C. Anstey), Lt. Pierre Elliot Inchbald, 2nd Lt. Victor Walrond, 2nd Lt. Neil James Robert Wright

48th Battery: Maj Cosmo Gordon Stewart DSO, Capt. Richmond Ffolliott Powell, Lt. Donald Ramsey MacDonald, Lt. Charles William Campbell, 2Lt. Arthur Lefrey Pritchard Griffith

71st Battery: Maj. Charles Walker Scott, Capt. William Cecil Holt Cree, Lt. Melvil Farrant, 2nd Lt. Anthony Chaworth-Musters, 2nd Lt. Archibald Charles Mark Walsh

36th Brigade Ammunition Column: Capt. Robert Hadden Haining, Lt. Christopher Geldard, Lt. Percival Llewellyn Vining

Warrant officers and senior NCOs on mobilisation included RSM Andrew Imlach (15982); 15th Battery - BSM Bert Avery (18958); BQMS Thomas Wallace Coles (30543); 48th Battery - BSM Arthur Frank Pilcher (11352); BQMS William Charles Smith (23664); 71st Battery - BSM David William Phillpotts (22245); BQMS Charles John Read (19995); 36th Brigade Ammunition Column - BSM Frederick Bradford (13922);
