= 68th (Durham) Regiment of Foot (Light Infantry) =

Infantry unit of the British Army

68th Regiment of Foot
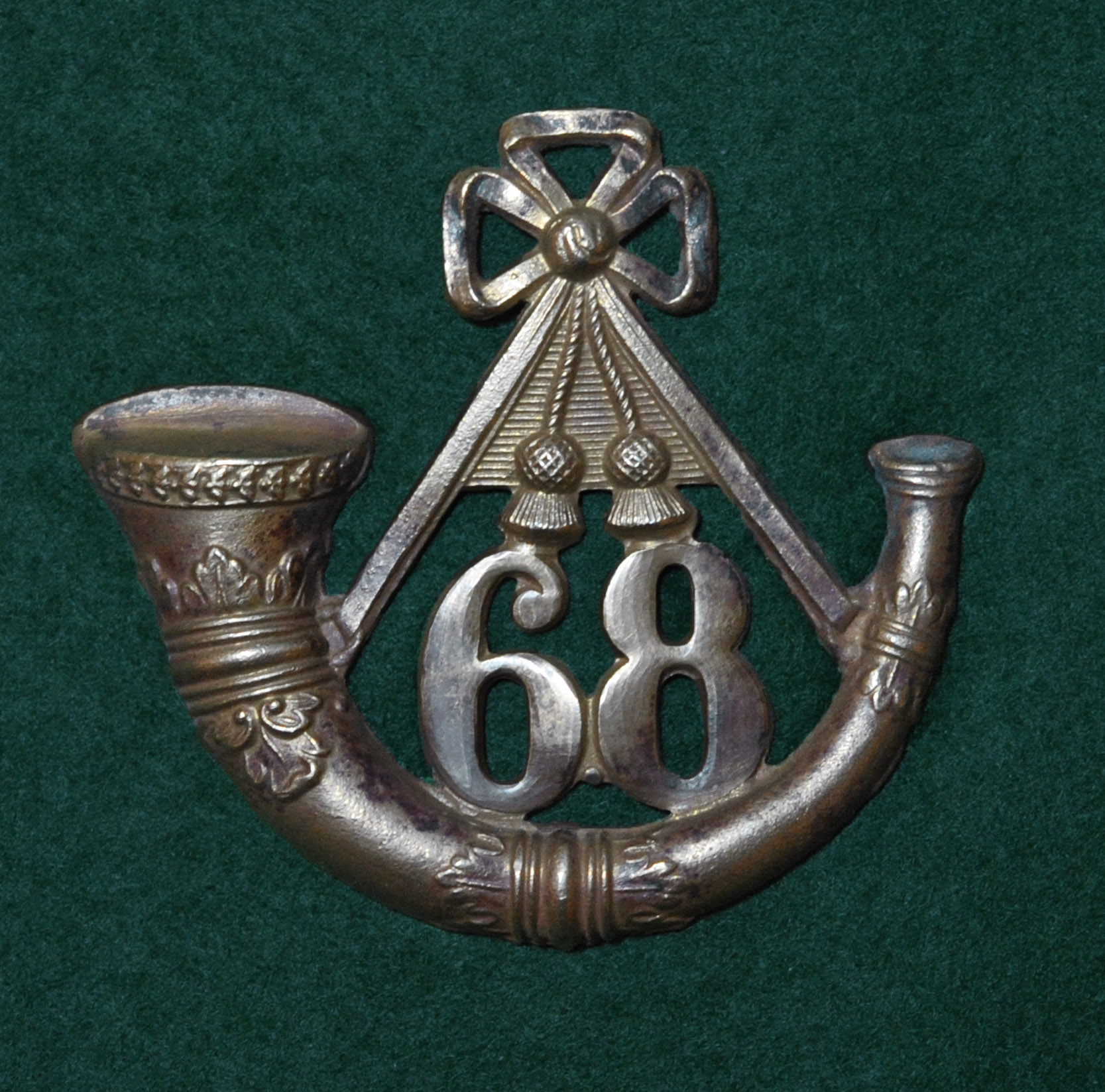
- Glengarry cap badge of the 68th (Durham) Regiment of Foot
- Active: 1756–1881
- Country: Kingdom of Great Britain (1756–1800); United Kingdom (1801–1881)
- Branch: British Army
- Type: Infantry, Light Infantry
- Size: One Battalion; Two between May 1800 and September 1802
- Garrison/HQ: Sunderland Barracks
- Motto: Faithful
- Colours: Facing colour: Dark Green up to 1816; Bottle Green up to 1834; Green up to 1861; Dark Green up to 1881
- March: I'm Ninety Five, (1856–1881)
- Anniversaries: Inkerman Day (5 November)
- Engagements: Seven Years' War; Peninsular War; Crimean War; New Zealand Wars

The 68th (Durham) Regiment of Foot (Light Infantry) was an infantry regiment of the British Army, raised in 1758. Under the Childers Reforms it amalgamated with the 106th Bombay Light Infantry to form the Durham Light Infantry in 1881, the 68th Regiment becoming the 1st Battalion, and the 106th Regiment becoming the 2nd Battalion in the regular Army. It saw action during the Seven Years' War before being converted to Light Infantry in 1808, fighting with distinction in the Peninsular Army under Arthur Wellesley. It would go on to fight with some distinction during the Crimean War, served during the Indian Mutiny and the New Zealand wars before returning to India between 1872 and 1888.

== Formation ==
In August 1756, after the loss of Minorca in the Seven Years' War, the 23rd Regiment of Foot, together with 14 other regiments was ordered to raise a 2nd Battalion, which it did while in Leicester. On 22 April 1758 the 2nd battalion was separated from the 23rd regiment as a new regiment and ranked as the 68th in order of precedence with the appointment of a new colonel as Lambton's Regiment of Foot or the 68th Regiment of foot. (The practice of referring to regiments by their colonel's name was gradually going out of fashion, being replaced by the regiments' order of precedence.)

== The Seven Years War ==
In May 1758 it marched to the Isle of Wight as part of the forces (14,000 soldiers in five brigades and 6,000 marines) stationed on the island at the request of Britain's ally Frederick the Great of Prussia. The intention was to conduct raids (descents as they were then called) on the French coast to disturb privateers in the area, distract the French army and relieve pressure on Britain's allies, the Prussians. The first expedition (3 Guards, 9 line regiments) anchored at Cancale Bay, near St Malo, on 5 May, the grenadier company being part of the forces that destroyed four King's ships, 60 merchantmen and several privateers in Paramé. The remainder of the regiment constructed fortifications around Cancale until taken off on 12 June. After threatening other ports in the region, the fleet returned to Britain on 6 July.

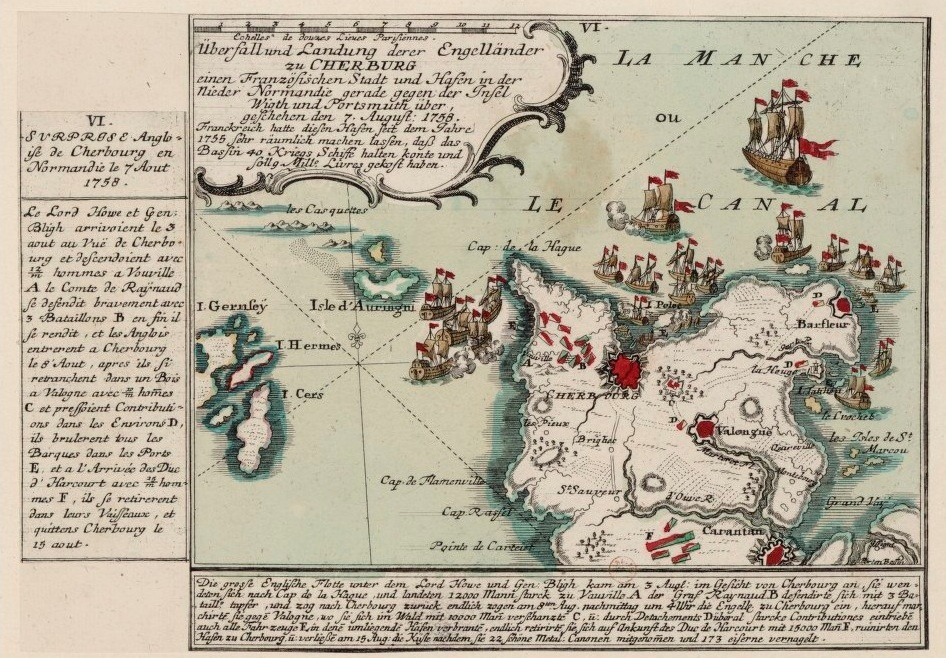
A contemporary map of the raid on Cherbourg with French and German notes

A second expedition involving the 68th on the French coast was landed on 7 August in the Bay of Ureville and marched for Cherbourg. The town was taken with little resistance from the local militia or the Régiment de Clare, and the fort and harbour were demolished. The troops left on 16 August but did not return to Britain. A third and final expedition was launched on 3 September; the 68th landed at Lunaire Bay, again near St Malo, but suffered severe defeat after the French concentrated their army and engaged the British army at St. Cast. The governor of Brittany, the Duc d'Aiguillon, led a force of 6,000 regulars, several squadrons of cavalry and the "Garde de Cote" militia against the British, who fought a rearguard action while evacuating the beach. The French claimed British casualties were 900 officers and men, with 600 taken prisoner. The 68th lost 70 men from Captain Revell's grenadiers company, who formed part of the rear guard with grenadiers from the other regiments left on the beach.

The 68th disembarked at Cowes on 19 September, and in October the regiment marched into winter quarters at Rochester. With losses in expeditions (mostly from the poor conditions aboard ship) and providing a draft of 173 men to the 61st regiment, it was very weak, and recruiting parties scoured the country to refill its ranks. On 2 June 1759, the regiment embarked for Jersey. It arrived on 21 June and remained there until February 1760, returning to England. In March, 600 men of the regiment, in three groups of 200, were drafted into the British regiments in the West Indies; this reduced the regiment to a mere 58 rank and file. The regiment was marched to Leeds, then Newcastle, and billeted at Tynemouth Barracks. At this point, recruiting had enabled it to muster nine (weak) companies consisting of 41 officers and 239 men.

There the 68th would remain through 1761, with a detachment sent to Durham to aid civil power and providing a draft of 95 men for the 70th Regiment. By May, the regiment was based at Hexham with its headquarters at Morpeth, with a strength of 42 officers and 289 men. In January 1762, the 68th had grown to 415 men and was ordered to march to Berwick, where it transferred to the command of Lord George Beauclerk, commanding in Scotland (North Britain as it was referred to since the 1745 rebellion). It was quartered at the newly built Fort George and remained throughout 1762, until July 1763 when to was shipped to Ireland.

== The West Indies ==
In 1764 the regiment left Ireland on 2 June with a strength of just over half the establishment (250 privates, establishment: 423) and sailed for the Caribbean, arriving in Antigua after a swift passage on 21 June. Eight uneventful (Note: In terms of fighting; the establishment strength was reduced twice, buttons with the regimental number were introduced in 1767 and a light infantry company was attached in June 1771.) years passed until mid 1772, when six companies were sent to St. Vincent to fight rebellious Caribs, where more men were sick with diseases (63) than were killed or wounded in fighting (36). It was during this fighting that the motto, 'Faithful' is supposed to have been gained and placed on the colours.

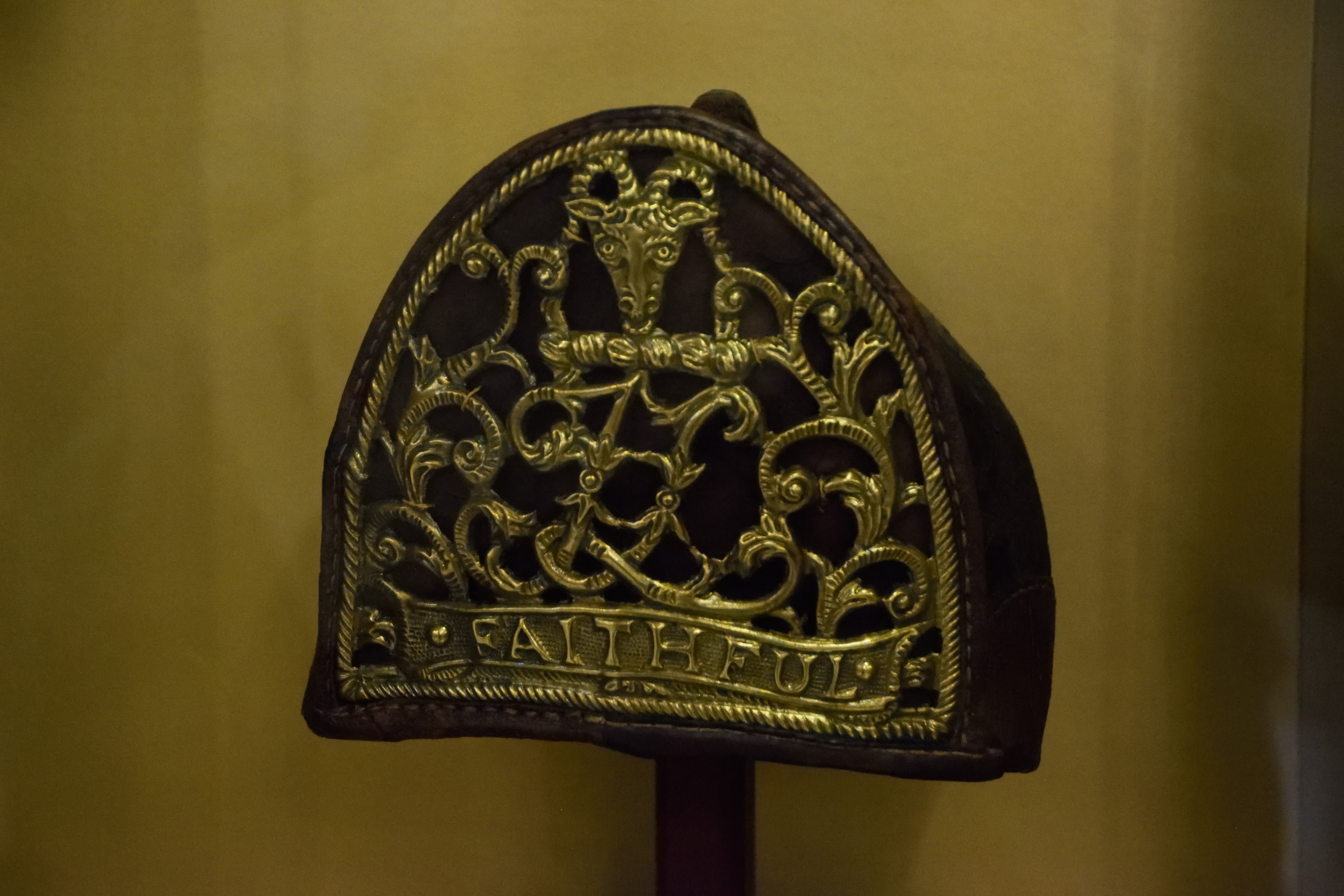
Leather cap worn by the 68th Regiment of Foot 1770s from the Durham Light Infantry museum

In March 1773 the regiment left the Caribbean for Britain, where it over-wintered in Tynemouth. In May 1774 it returned to Scotland and Fort George, staying until December 1775, when it moved once more to Ireland. It was while serving in Dublin that disputes with other regiments arose over the motto displayed on the colours (as it could imply that other regiments were less faithful), and the motto was not repeated on later colours. The regiment was to spend seven and a half years deployed around Ireland. Near the end of that time, August 1782, it was decided to attach counties to regiments to aid recruitment, and the 68th was allotted to County Durham, becoming the 68th (Durham) Regiment of Foot. (Note: This meant that only a recruiting party was to be stationed permanently in the county. The Regimental Depot would continue to follow the regiment while in the United Kingdom.)

In 1779, the regiment was in the news when one of its former officers, James Hackman, was hanged for the notorious murder of Martha Ray, mistress of the Earl of Sandwich.

It left Ireland in September, at nearly full strength (793 all ranks), for Portsmouth. In December the regiment was brought up to full strength (a war establishment of 847 all ranks) and was destined for service in Jamaica. News of the Peace of Paris caused a mutiny, especially among those men who had signed up only for 'three years service or the duration', and the regiment was put ashore from the transport ships it was in.

After guarding prisoners of war at Winchester, in October the regiment was sent to Jersey and Guernsey. It left, after a brief return to England (June–September 1784), in early October 1785 for Gibraltar, and being briefly threatened with disbandment during the reduction of the Army's size in 1784.

The regiment's stay in Gibraltar was uneventful, except for the reduction to the peacetime establishment, and in December 1794 it was shipped to the West Indies (with the 46th and 61st regiments) as reinforcements for the British forces there. The regiment was dispersed to the islands of Martinique, St. Lucia and Grenada, where they fought against Fédon's rebellion which was being supported by the French. The Brigands were defeated on 18 June 1796, but the 68th played no part, having been reduced by fighting and especially yellow fever to 61 fit men, and after a draft to the 63rd regiment, 10 officers and 27 other ranks returned to Britain in September. After officers' leave and discharges, only seven men marched away from Portsmouth.

Recruiting began around the Midlands, and by the time the regiment landed in Ireland in March 1797 it was 202 men strong. Its strength fell, and by April 1798 when the 68th were called out to guard the guns at Dublin against the rebels, it fielded 36 men; by the end of 1799 it had grown to only 120. In February 1800 while in Trim, the regiment received nearly 1,800 Irish volunteers from the Militia, and after it had returned to England in March, it was divided into two battalions in May.

In late November the two battalions separately embarked for the West Indies, arriving between late January 1801 and March, to be stationed on Martinique, Barbados, The Saints and Dominica. Yellow fever soon hit; by the end of the year, over one quarter of the officers had died. In April 1802, 360 men of 2/68th helped suppress a mutiny by the 8th West India Regiment on Dominica, caused by the unscrupulousness of their colonel. By September the losses from disease were such that the two battalions were merged on Barbados. The Treaty of Amiens was signed in 1802, returning St Lucia and Martinique to the French. However, war broke out again in May 1803, and in June the 68th was sent (with the Royal Scots and the 64th regiment) to retake St. Lucia. The 68th was in reserve for the fighting and remained as the island garrison. In February 1805, having lost 500 dead and 170 invalided to England, the regiment was moved to St. Vincent, and in April to Antigua. Here they stayed until June 1806, when it embarked for England with 140 men. (Note: While in the West Indies, all regiments were continually strengthened with drafts of men. One for the 68th was described as being composed of 'deserters, recruits and culprits'. The 'culprits' were mostly former Irish rebels of 1798, condemned to perpetual service in the West Indies, and passed from regiment to regiment as one went home.)

== Walcheren ==
The regiment spent the winter in Ripon, where by December 1807, after receiving recruits (Note: One of whom was John Green, the author of Vicissitudes of a Soldier's Life; or, A Series of Occurrences from 1806 to 1815) and drafts from militias from Ireland, Durham and West Yorkshire, it had a strength of 436 rank and file. It remained in and around Yorkshire, and while in Hull was ordered to convert to light infantry, as the 43rd and 52nd regiments had been, to form a light brigade. Marched to Brabourne Lees, Kent, it was to train with the 85th regiment under the master of light infantry training, Lt. Col. Franz von Rothenburg. After more recruiting, almost one quarter of the regiment's men were from County Durham by the time the regiment left for Walcheren in July 1809.

The invasion of Walcheren by an army of nearly 40,000 men in 15 brigades was an attempt to simultaneously destroy a French fleet together with the Antwerp shipyards and distract Napoleon from Austria. Landing on the island on 30 July, on 1 August together with the 85th they pursued defending forces to the walls of Flushing, which fell after a siege on 15 August. Malaria now began to infect the troops, and by 25 September it was reduced to 99 fit men, with 384 men eventually dying from the 'Walcheren fever' as opposed to only 15 in combat. The regiment left the island in December, landing at Deal.

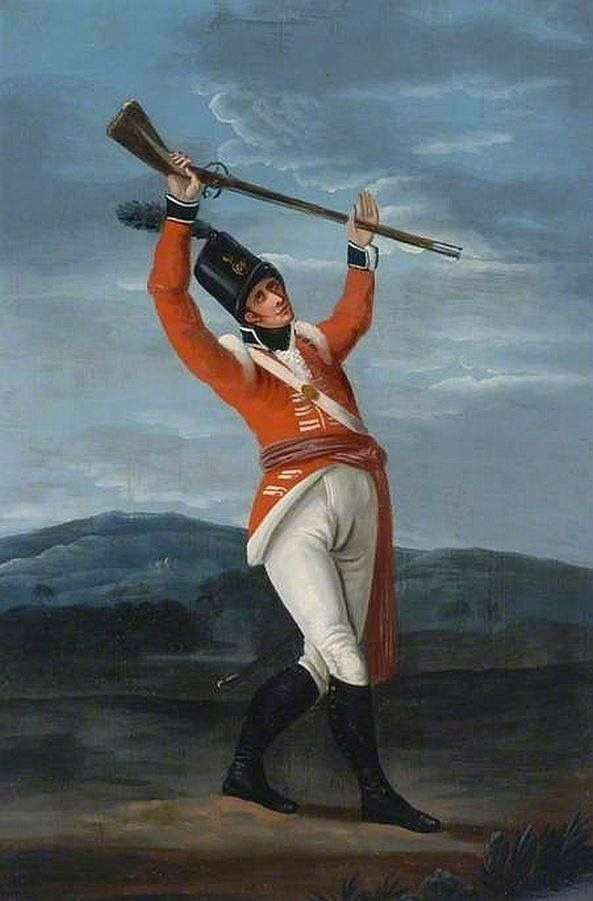
c. 1810 painting of a regimental sergeant

The regiment continued to suffer from the effects of malaria, and only by October 1810 was seen to be beginning to recover. In February 1811, while three companies were billeted in Arundel, a party of officers and men assaulted some of the townsmen in return for repeated insults aimed at the officers, resulting in the courts-martial of the officers, and two lieutenants becoming "prisoners of the civil power". In June 1811 the regiment sailed for Portugal.

== Peninsular War ==
Landing in Lisbon on 27 June 1811, by 17 July it had reached Arronches, where it joined the newly formed 7th Division (nicknamed the 'Mongrels' (Note: So called because of its diverse make up: (Germans (King's German Legion and Brunswick-Oels Light infantry), British, French (Chasseurs Britanniques) and Portuguese (Line Infantry and Caçadores)), and diverse uniform colours of: green and black (Germans), red (British and French) and blue and brown (Portuguese).)). For the rest of the year the regiment marched around Northern Portugal, entering Spain in September to aid in the masking of Ciudad Rodrigo, returning to Portugal by October. The effects of the Walcheren expedition were still with the regiment, with the marches increasing the sick-list and, until February 1812, 25 men dying every month. Throughout 1812, in spite of replacements the number fit for duty rarely rose above 270.

In January 1812 the regiment deployed with the 7th division as the reserve at Fuenteguinaldo during the capture of Ciudad Ridrigo. Returning to Portugal on 19 January the regiment set off South on 20 February, crossing into Spain on 16 March, and again formed a covering force during the siege and capture of Badajoz. The regiment returned to Portugal, where in May it was inspected by Major-General John de Bernewitz, resulting in uncomplimentary observations.

=== Salamanca ===
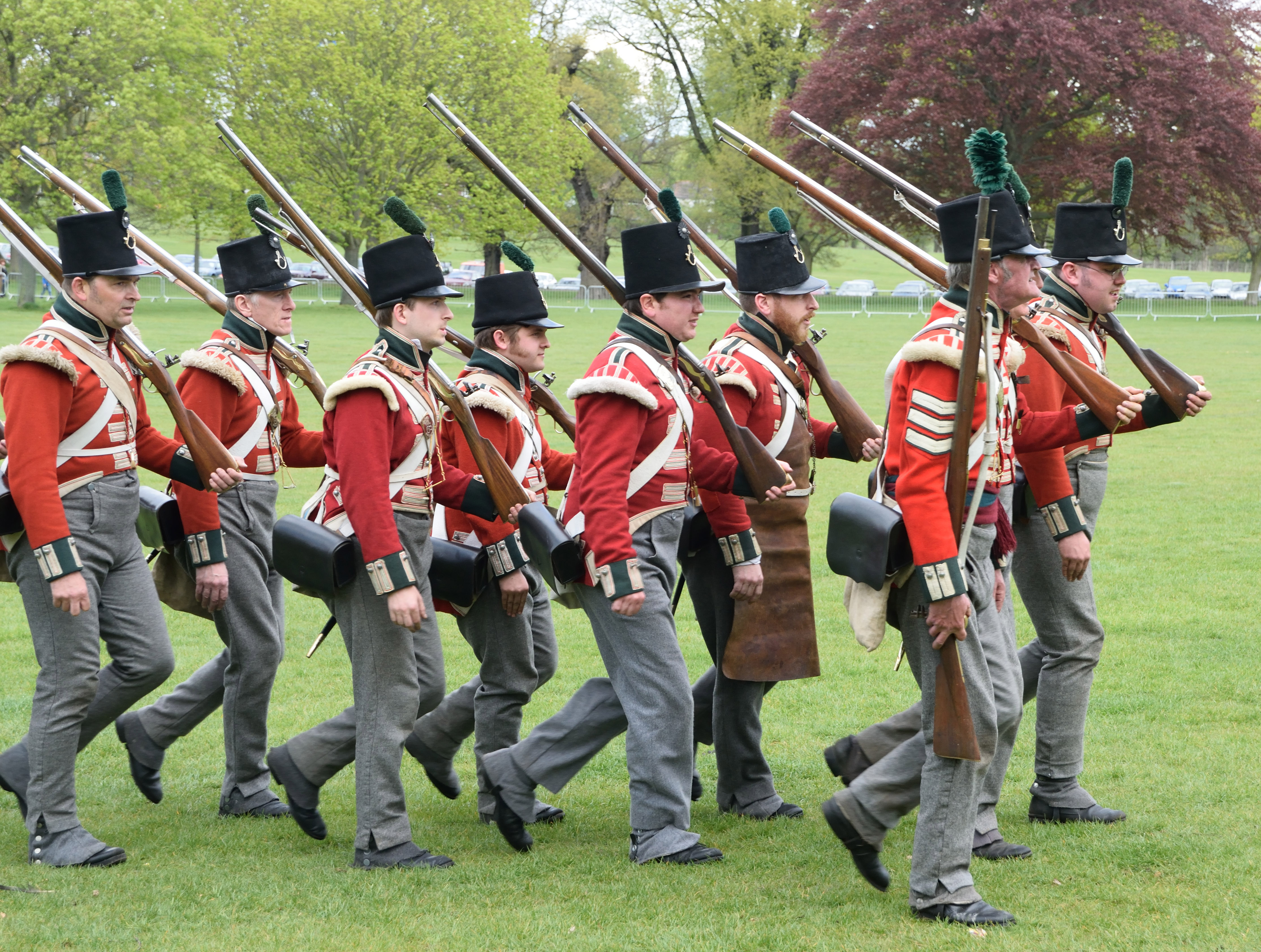
Re-enactors dressed in the regimental uniform of 1812–1816

The regiment marched back into Spain with the 7th Division on 2 June 1812, and on 20 June reached its position near Salamanca on the heights of Villares. Late in the day the regiment, reinforced with a company of Brunswick Oels (owing to its still weakened state), was ordered off the heights and down into the village of Moresco. With detachments blocking each street and lane, the regiment fought off French attempts to take the village until ordered to retire back up the hill at nightfall. One Captain W Mackay received 22 bayonet wounds but survived and later recovered. On 22 June an attempt by Marmont to take the heights above Moresco was halted by the 68th, the Chasseurs Britanniques and the 51st Regiment.

On 27 June the last of the Samalanca forts surrendered to the 6th Division, and by mid July Marmont's reinforced Army began to manoeuvre against Wellington's:

It was an extraordinary and grand sight to see two armies drawn up ready for battle, and manœuvring during a whole day without fighting.

— Pte John Green, 68th Regiment,

Early on 22 July the 68th and 2nd Caçadores skirmished with French Voltigeures probing for the flank of the Army. Retaining control of a hill, they were subject to artillery fire until relieved by the 95th Regiment in the afternoon. By 4 o'clock it was back with the 7th Division and advanced against the French in the general action ending in their defeat.

Following the retreating French, on 12 August the 51st and the 68th were the first regiments to march into Madrid, to great excitement from the population. Late the next day the 51st, 68th and the Chasseurs Britanniques assaulted fortified buildings in the Buen Retiro Park garrisoned by some 2,000 French troops who surrendered on the morning of 14 August.

Wellington's army continued its advance besieging Burgos in September, with the 68th at Olmos covering the siege and constructing breastworks in the valley at Monasterio de Rodilla in mid October. The French now showed signs of attacking, and attempting to out-flank the British forces around Madrid, and Wellington began another retreat back to Portugal in the rain and mud of autumn. The regiment went into winter quarters at Paços de Baixo and Paços de Cima in December. Due to its weakened state, 235 men fit for duty and 247 sick, it was briefly threatened with being combined with another weak regiment into a 'Provisional Battalion'. However the regiment shared in the recovery of Wellington's army as a whole and by April 1813 had 439 men fit with only 97 sick.

The advance into Spain began in early May, marching rapidly through the North of the country, with the troops suffering as they out-ran their supply train.

=== Vitoria ===
Wellington arrived in the area of Vitoria on 20 June 1813. The 7th division, together with the 3rd, formed the left centre column of the attack the next day, advancing south across the River Zadorra. Now advancing east, the regiment, with the 2nd Brigade, came under heavy cannon and musket fire:

I really thought that, if it lasted much longer, there would not have been a man left to relate the circumstance.

— Pte John Green, 68th Regiment,

The brigade took shelter in a ditch some 200 yards from the French guns. While the commander of the column, Lord Dalhousie hesitated, Vandeleur's brigade arrived and both brigades began the line advance into Vitoria, competing for the honour of their division. That night it camped among the remains of Joseph Bonaparte's baggage train, whom Napoleon had made King of Spain. (Note: When searched on 6th July the men of the Regiment were each relieved of an average of £32. 10s. 8¾d. of looted treasure.)

=== Pyrenees ===
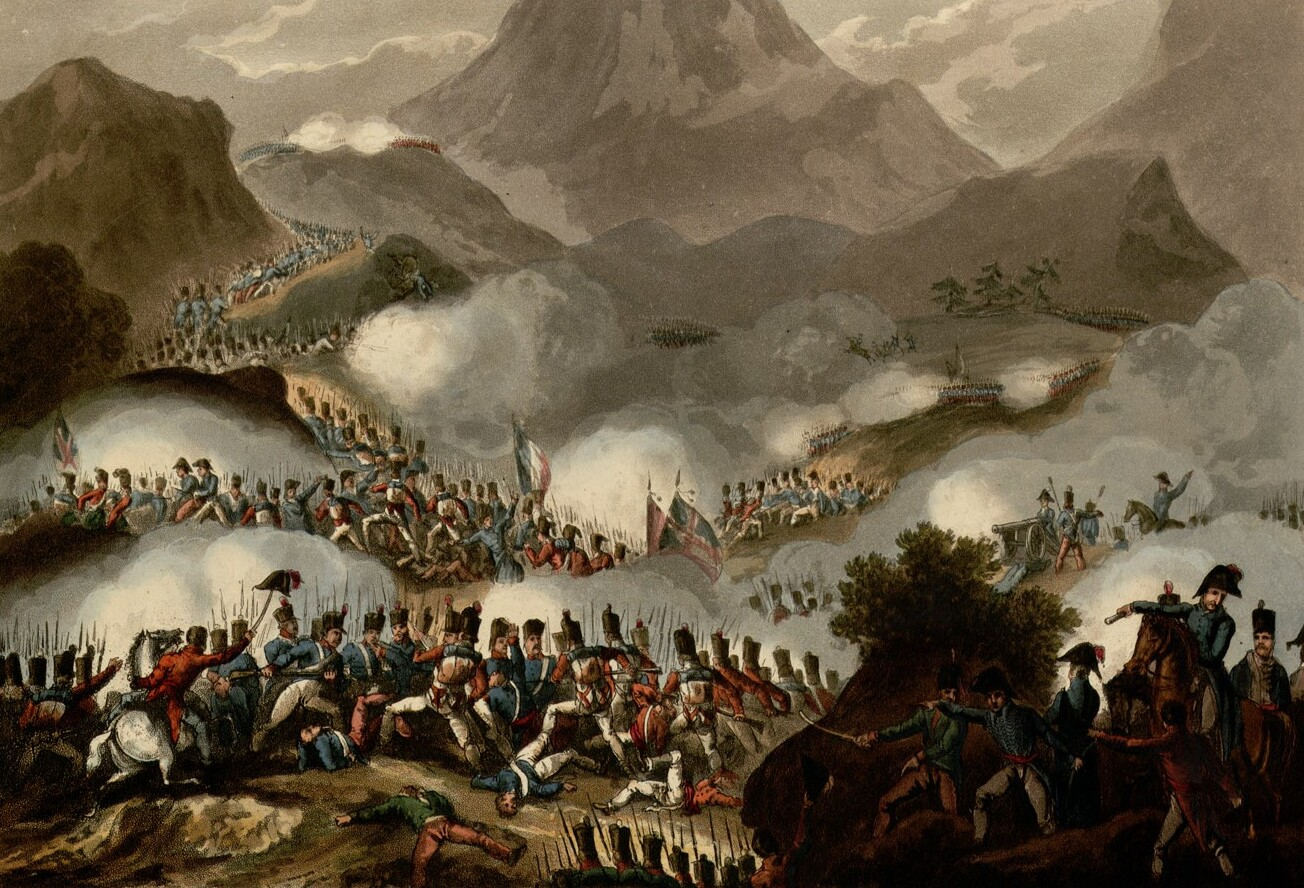
The Battle of the Pyrenees, which the regiment fought in

In July 1813 the British advance continued into the Pyrenees, with the French leaving garrisons at San Sebastián and Pamplona, and the bulk of the army retreating into France to be reorganized by Soult. Soult launched a double pronged attack into Spain on 25 July. After marching and counter-marching between Pamplona and Mt Achiola, the regiment, with the rest of the Inglis's brigade, attacked two battalions of Clausel's flank guard at Ostiz on 30 July, driving the French by bayonet down into the valley, as Soult attempted to join d'Erlon after being beaten off from Pamplona. The next day as Clausel continued north, the brigade attacked the French on a steep hill near Urroz. After sequential volleys from the 82nd and 51st, the 68th fired, and accompanied by the Chasseurs Britanniques, drove the French from the hill. On 2 August the 7th Division, with the 4th and part of the Light Division, had the luck to attack the weak centre of the remains of Soult's Corps on the heights above Etxalar. At the end of the month, Soult again attempted to relieve San Sebastián, using two divisions in a diversionary attack across the river Bidasoa around Vera. Inglis's brigade arrived on 31 August to be slowly pushed back up the side of the valley by the greater numbers of French, until learning of the failure of the main attack the French retired. (Note: In this battle Pte Green was wounded.... but Captain Glenstanes being near the spot, I said, "Sir, am I to be left in this condition, to be killed or taken by the enemy?" "No my man"... "I will assist you.", and...conducted me out of reach of the enemy...who were not more than two hundred yards from me. — Pte John Green, 68th Regiment,)

=== Nivelle ===
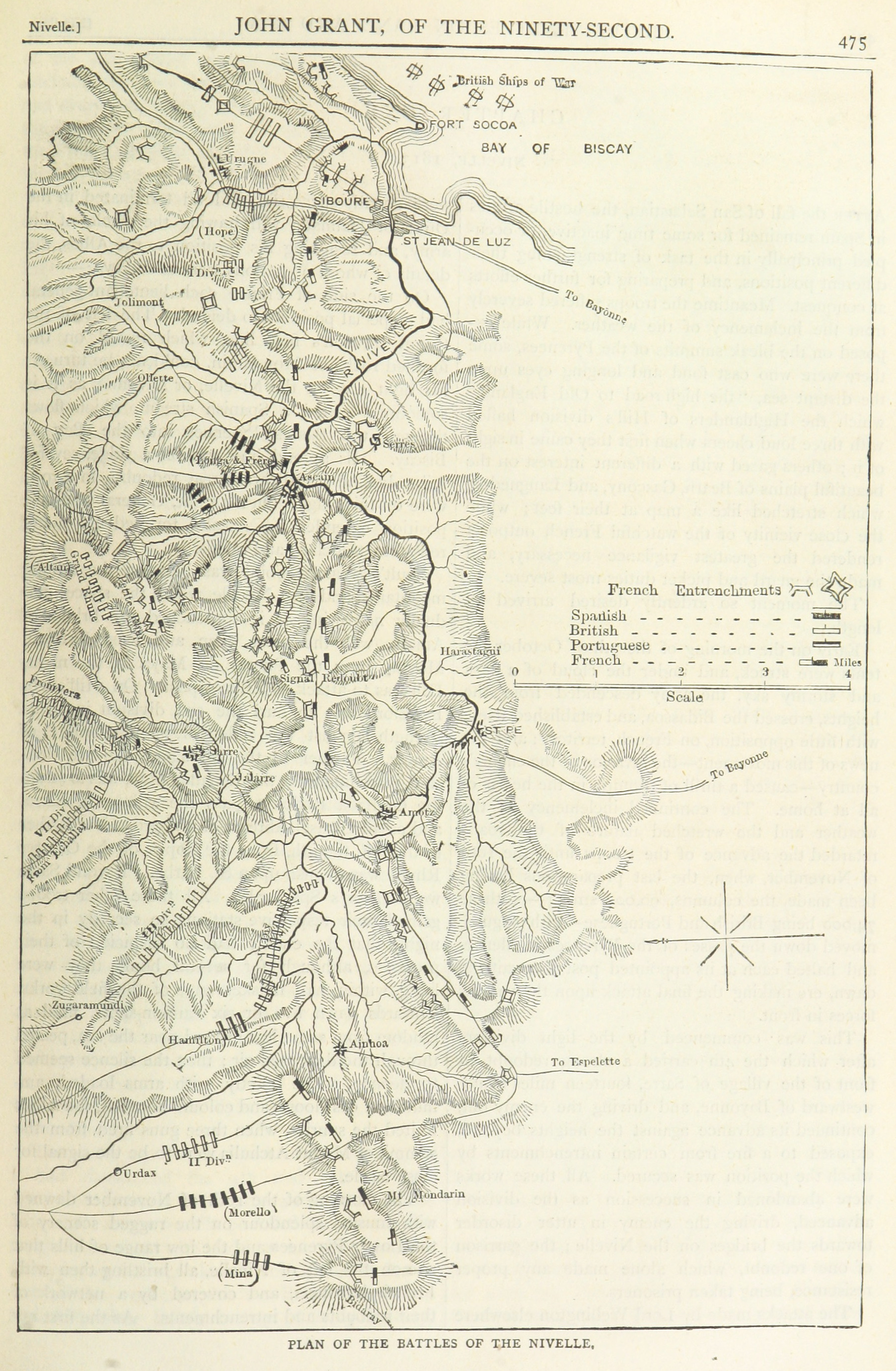
The Battle of Nivelle

In October 1813 Wellington crossed into France, and on 10 November attacked the formidable, but undermanned, position which Marshal Soult had been three months fortifying on the Nivelle. The 68th and the brigade took a number of redoubts at the rush, at Sare, and encountered some resistance taking those on the heights beyond Saint-Pée-sur-Nivelle. Col. Inglis wrote, 'The 68th made the attack with its usual vivacity...' As the army went into winter quarters the regiment numbered only 197 men.

By the beginning of the next offensive in February 1814, the regiment's strength had risen to 258 fit for duty.

=== Orthez ===
The 7th Division advanced across the Nive and took up positions south of the Adour, in order to distract Soult from Wellington's main effort to the west. From 23 February 1814 the division moved west across the river's tributaries, and by the 27th had reached Orthez. Attacking Soult's right, behind the 4th Division, which was checked after taking the village of Saint-Boès, the 68th, 82nd and Chasseurs Britanniques charged the heights that had held the 4th Division, and forced out the French Division there.

On 8 March the 4th and 7th Divisions were marched north and entered Bordeaux on 12 March without fighting, and where for the rest of the month Inglis's brigade shadowed French troops further up river. Napoleon abdicated on 12 April, and on 8 July the regiment embarked for Ireland, arriving on the 26th.

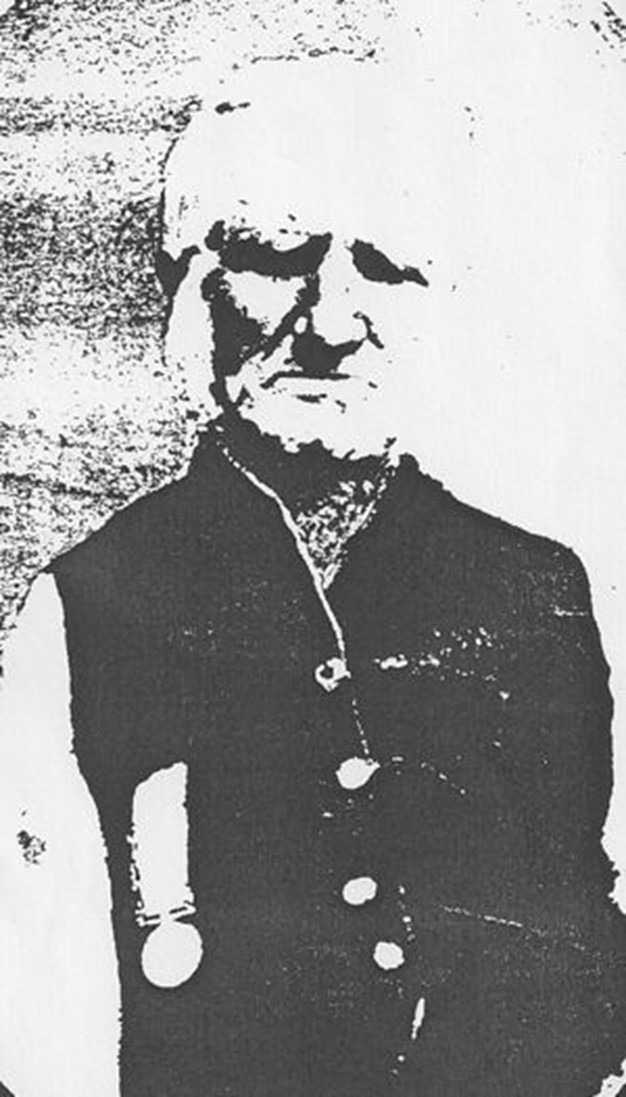
Private Thomas Kirkham, 68th Regiment, wounded at the Battle of Orthez and later settled in Canada. He wears the Military General Service Medal.

== 1814–1854 ==
The regiment would not see active service for forty years, spending the first four years in Ireland, where on 6 April 1815 it was awarded its first battle honour, Peninsular. In May 1818 the regiment embarked for Canada, where it remained until October 1829. While there the infantry was reorganised (in 1825) so that four of the ten companies in a regiment would remain in Britain with the depot when deployed overseas. When the regiment returned to Britain, its first inspection at Fermoy showed it had suffered from the peace, with many of the officers and sergeants too old and unfit for active service. By 1835, under new commanders, the regiment was revitalised, with increased application of the light infantry drill, and the issue of what were to become the regimental Standing Orders. In December 1833 the 68th left for Edinburgh, with a detachment suppressing riots in Glasgow in February 1834, and in September sailing for Portsmouth then Gibraltar.

The regiment's three years in Gibraltar were enlivened only by changes to the uniform. Sailing to Jamaica in January 1838, it was to receive favourable inspection reports, but was to lose 104 men to disease by the time it left in June 1841. Arriving in Canada in August, the regiment was deployed along territory forming part of the Maine border dispute, returning to normal stations in August 1842. Further positive inspection reports were received before the regiment left for England in May 1844. In November the regiment was reviewed by the Duke of Wellington.

During August 1846 the regiment was sent to Ireland where it helped in keeping the peace during the elections of 1847. It then spent the next three years dispersed in small detachments around central Ireland, until concentrating in Limerick in April 1850. In February 1851 the regiment embarked for Malta.

== Crimean War ==
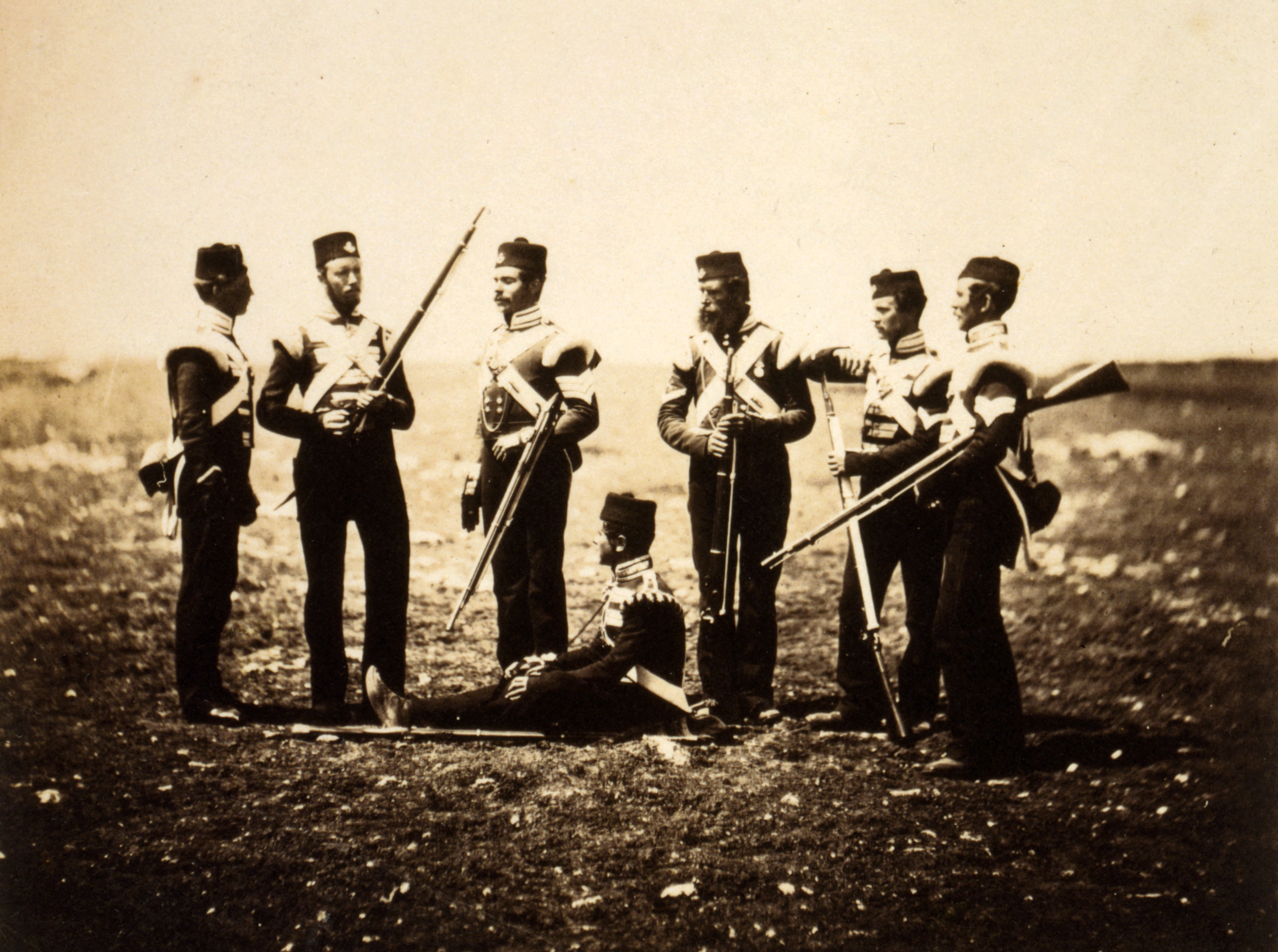
Soldiers of the 68th Regiment in ordinary dress, late April 1855. Henry Sladden, 4th man standing from the left, is wearing his D.C.M. This is possibly the first photograph of this medal.

While in Malta, in February 1854, the regiment was brought up to war establishment (~1240 other ranks), after losing men in drafts to other regiments preceding it to the Black Sea:

We are made up to our strength very hastily of odds and ends and young recruits.

— Lt. Col Henry Smyth,

On 7 August the regiment, still short of establishment at 867 all ranks, embarked for Beikos bay on the Bosphorus, arriving on 12 August, then Varna on 1 September, where it was posted to the 7th Brigade of the 4th Division, and finally near Eupatoria in the Crimea on 14 September. Two companies were detached to provide the escort to Lord Raglan; they were not to rejoin the regiment until April of the next year.

At the Battle of the Alma the division was in reserve, although the regiment briefly came under artillery fire. In late September the regiment arrived at the heights south of Sevastopol, after losing 44 men from cholera on the Alma battlefield and on the march south.

On 25 October the Russians attempted to take the port of Balaclava, used by the Allies as the port of supply. The 4th Division arrived late to the battle, its men having spent the night in the trenches before Sevastopol. Arriving as the Russians were retiring, only two companies of the 68th Regiment were present, losing one killed and one injured.

=== Inkerman ===
On 5 November 1854 the Russians launched an attack on the allies' right with ~42,000 men in three corps. With the arrival of the 4th Division, which had again spent the night in the trenches around Sevastopol, the British were able to go on the offensive. The 68th numbered only four companies (243 all ranks), two still being in the trenches, and as they wore their greatcoats over their ammunition pouches while on guard had taken these off and were (initially) the only British regiment in red coats.

On seeing the Russians attempting to outflank the Guards on Sandbag Battery, Cathcart sent Torrens' brigade of ten companies (four of the 20th Regiment, two of the 46th Regiment and the four of the 68th) against them, sending the three Russian battalions into the valley below. The 68th followed the Russians too far, and now were out of ammunition. On retiring along the valley they found more Russians on a ridge above their right:

The French Zouaves saved the 68th from being totally annihilated. The 'Light Bobs' having followed the Russians into the valley, whence ascending they found themselves confronted by the grey clad warriors.

— Capt Horatio Morant,

It was during this action that Pte. John Byrne and Sgt. Daniel Dwyer returned to this ravine to rescue wounded comrades, which would lead both to be recommended for the Victoria Cross, and Byrne to receive it. With this cover, the regiment was reorganised with the rest of the brigade and other stragglers, including Guardsmen, and were then deployed to 'The Barrier' in front of Home Hill for the rest of the battle. The losses for the day were 69 men killed, wounded or missing.

The regiment remained on trench duty in the siege of Sevastopol subject to the poor conditions caused by the poor supply situation, only made worse by the storm of the night of 13/14 November that blew down tents, scattered supplies and sank transport ships in Balaclava harbour. (Note: "It raged with the greatest fury, scarcely a tent was left standing and you saw property of every description flying – drums, shakos, water canteens, forage caps, all sorts of loose articles. And here and there a small weak Ensign was, without any joke, blown down." Capt Thomas Somerville) The regiment faced a sortie by the Russians from Sevastopol, on 12 January 1855 (the Orthodox New Year) which overran an outpost, resulting in 15 missing and 6 wounded.

By the end of February the regiment had been rearmed with the new Enfield rifle, replacing the smoothbore musket they had started the campaign with. A second, much larger sortie of some 2,000 men which took place on the night of 11 May was faced by detachments from the Rifle Brigade, 46th Foot and 250 men from the 68th. A party of Russians succeeded in spiking a gun but were driven off with the loss of six dead and 22 wounded. Pte John Byrne was again prominent, and Captain Hamilton was to win the Victoria Cross.

The regiment remained in the trenches, with the supply situation slowly improving, and was in reserve for the assault on the Redan both on 18 June and the final attack on 8 September. They remained in the Crimea while negotiations were conducted until May 1856 when the regiment embarked for Corfu. The casualties in the Crimea were 32 killed, 68 wounded in combat and 205 died from other causes, and the regiment was at a strength of 28 officers and 783 other ranks.

=== Awards ===
Besides the two V.C.s granted, a further nine were applied for but not approved, 15 D.C.M.s were awarded, seven awards of the French Legion of Honour, 13 of the Order of the Medjidie, six of the Sardinian Medal of Honour and seven of the Médaille militaire. Nine officers and men of the regiment, then in England, mostly returned as sick, received their Crimea Medal directly from Queen Victoria on 18 May 1855.

== India ==
Ground of the Calcutta Cricket Club, 15th Jan'y. 1861 H.M. 68th L.I. from Rangoon, versus the Calcutta Cricket Club, a lithograph after a watercolour by Percy Carpenter, depicting the Calcutta Cricket Club.

While in Corfu detachments were sent to Kythira, Zakynthos, Ithaca and Cephalonia, where they remained until returned to Britain in September 1857. The regiment was given new colours on 5 November by the Duke of Cambridge, and in December, with the suppression of the Indian Mutiny incomplete, it left for India, arriving at Rangoon on 30 March 1858. While in Burma it was to rotate three of four companies at Myede and Thayetmyo, with the rest in Rangoon.

Control of India passed from the East India Company to The Crown on 1 November; however, nothing was to change immediately for the regiment, its uneventful time in Burma passed with sports (Note: Contested by such teams as Old Sergeants vs. New Sergeants, The Ugly vs. The Handsome, left wing Privates vs. right wing Privates, The Heavy vs. The Light and The Tall vs. The Short.) and the first of a series of regimental journals The D.L.I. Gazette, or the Wanderer's Magazine, begun under the name Argo on 28 December 1857 while en route.

In Ireland, men from the Depot companies, then at Fermoy, assisted the civil power in keeping the peace in the elections of May 1859 in Limerick.

== New Zealand ==
In August 1863 the regiment was in line to return to Britain when the governor of New Zealand, Sir George Grey KCB, requested reinforcements to deal with a new outbreak of hostilities with the Māori. During October and November the regiment embarked on three ships from Rangoon with a strength of 974 officers and men. The three ships arrived in Auckland in mid January 1864. (Note: One ship with 500 men arrived on 10 January, 51 were charged with drunkenness two days later. Even so...we have a good name in the town for sobriety notwithstanding. — Lt. Col Horatio Morant, 68th Regiment,) Almost immediately detachments were sent to Tauranga, Rangiriri and Maketu after exchanging their red tunics for blue.

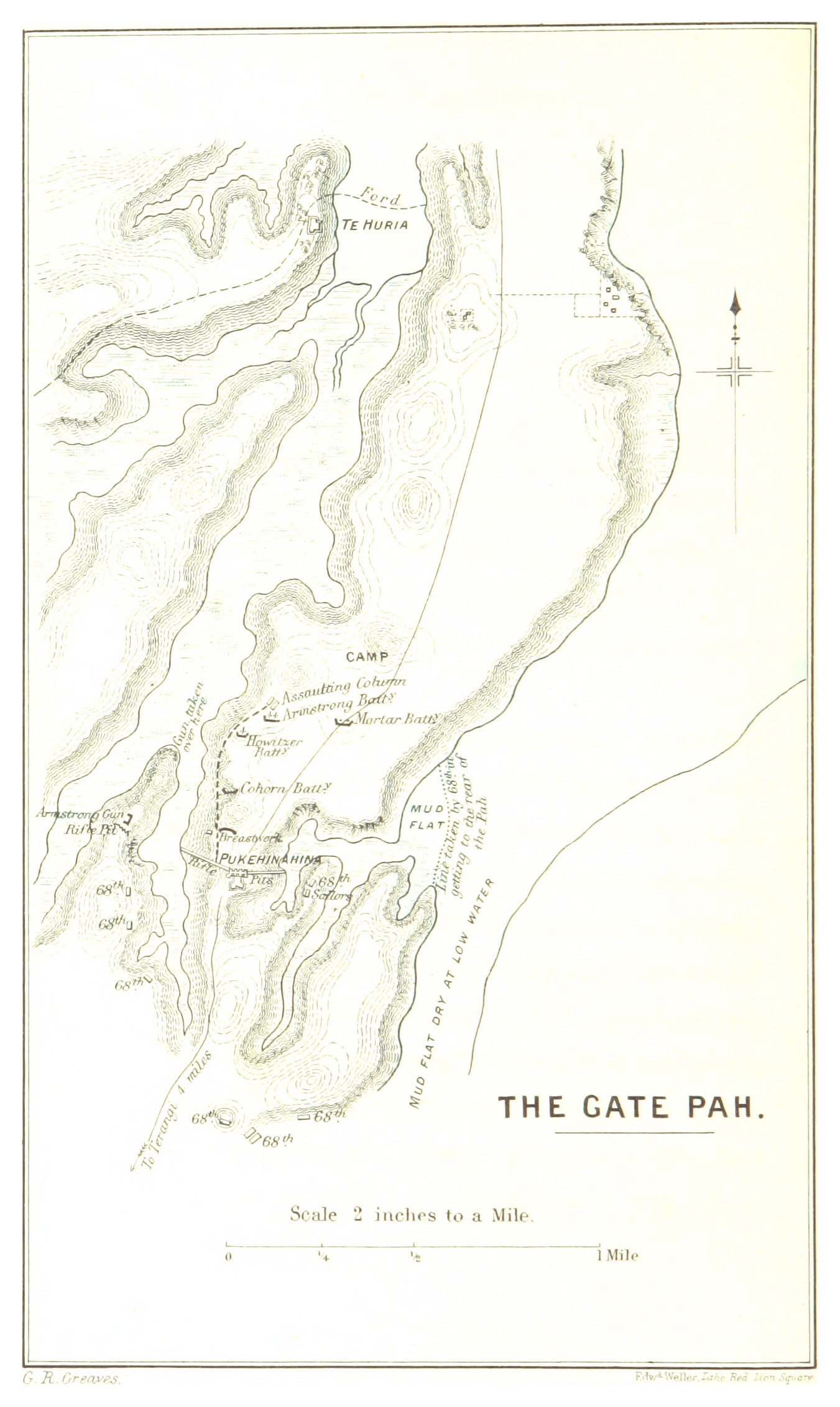
British and Māori positions at the Gate Pā, 29 April 1864

The Tauranga campaign began in April 1864, when the Māori of Te Ranga returned from the interior after assisting the Waikato and began to reoccupy pā sites in the area, including two on the neck of a peninsula housing the Te Papa mission in Tauranga Harbour. The 68th were concentrated in Auckland and sent to reinforce Tauranga accompanied by detachments from other regiments, arriving on 21 April. Two redoubts were built at Tauranga, Monmouth redoubt by the 43rd Regiment and Durham redoubt by the 68th, the latter's location commemorated by 'Durham Street' in the city today.

The commanding officer Maj. General Cameron wanted the Māori pā quickly reduced, so initiated the Battle of Gate Pā. On the evening of 28 April some 720 men of the 68th crossed to the rear of the Māori line via the mud flats of the harbour and deployed around the neck of the peninsula while another 700 men and artillery pieces prepared to assault from the front. At 7 the next morning a bombardment began with five guns and eight mortars, a few of which were 'overs' into the area occupied by the 68th. At about 4 in the evening a storming force of ~300 men, part 43rd Regiment, part naval brigade attacked. The companies of the 68th forced a body of Māori back into the pā at around 5 o'clock, and in a turn of events that is still unclear the attacking force was then routed from the pā. The 68th spent the night in their position at the rear of the pā, but were unable to form a close enough cordon to prevent the Māori escaping.

For six weeks the 68th and the other forces remained in the area around Te Papa, patrolling, with orders to prevent pā sites being established. On 21 June, after days of reports of movements of bodies of armed Māori, a patrol of ~600 men from the 68th, 43rd and a local regiment, the 1st Waikato Militia, led by Lt. Colonel Greer of the 68th, found a similarly sized body preparing rifle pits across a ridge some three miles from Te Papa. Greer sent for reinforcements, and for two hours until they arrived kept the Māori pinned down, then assaulted the position. The rifle pits were taken at a cost to the 68th of 5 killed and 24 wounded; Sgt. Murray was to be awarded the Victoria Cross. The next day a burial detail from the 68th interred 109 of the dead at the rifle pits.

The 68th remained in Te Papa until February 1865 when a detachment, 240 men strong, was sent to Wanganui when fighting flared up there. By now resentment was growing between the Regular Army soldiers and the local militias, and between their leaders, Cameron and Grey, over the use of the Army to expand the colonists' lands. The regiment remained split until both parts moved to Auckland in February 1866, and left New Zealand in March, reaching Portsmouth between mid-June and early July. During March 179 men (59 of whom were Crimea veterans) took their discharge and remained in New Zealand, either time served, or who purchased their remaining time or were given it free.

== 1866–1881 ==
The regiment spent three years in England with a gradual reduction in establishment to 640 men. In September 1869 the regiment was shipped to Ireland, where it was split into detachments and posted around the country. In September 1871 the establishment was raised to 1,032 all ranks prior to the regiment being sent to India in February of the next year. Arriving in March it was barracked in Pune.

In April 1873, as part of the Cardwell Reforms the regiment was linked with the 106th Regiment and assigned to district no. 3 at Sunderland Barracks in Sunderland, where it was brigaded together with the depot of the 106th Regiment, the district brigade depot and the Militia and Volunteers of County Durham.

The 68th Regiment were deployed in various parts of central, North and North West India, losing 37 men in cholera outbreaks in September 1878 and May 1879. During 1879 it received drafts of men from the 106th Regiment. It did not take part in the Second Anglo-Afghan War.

On 1 July 1881 as part of the Childers Reforms the 68th Regiment became the 1st Battalion of the Durham Light Infantry while stationed at Meerut.

== Victoria Cross ==
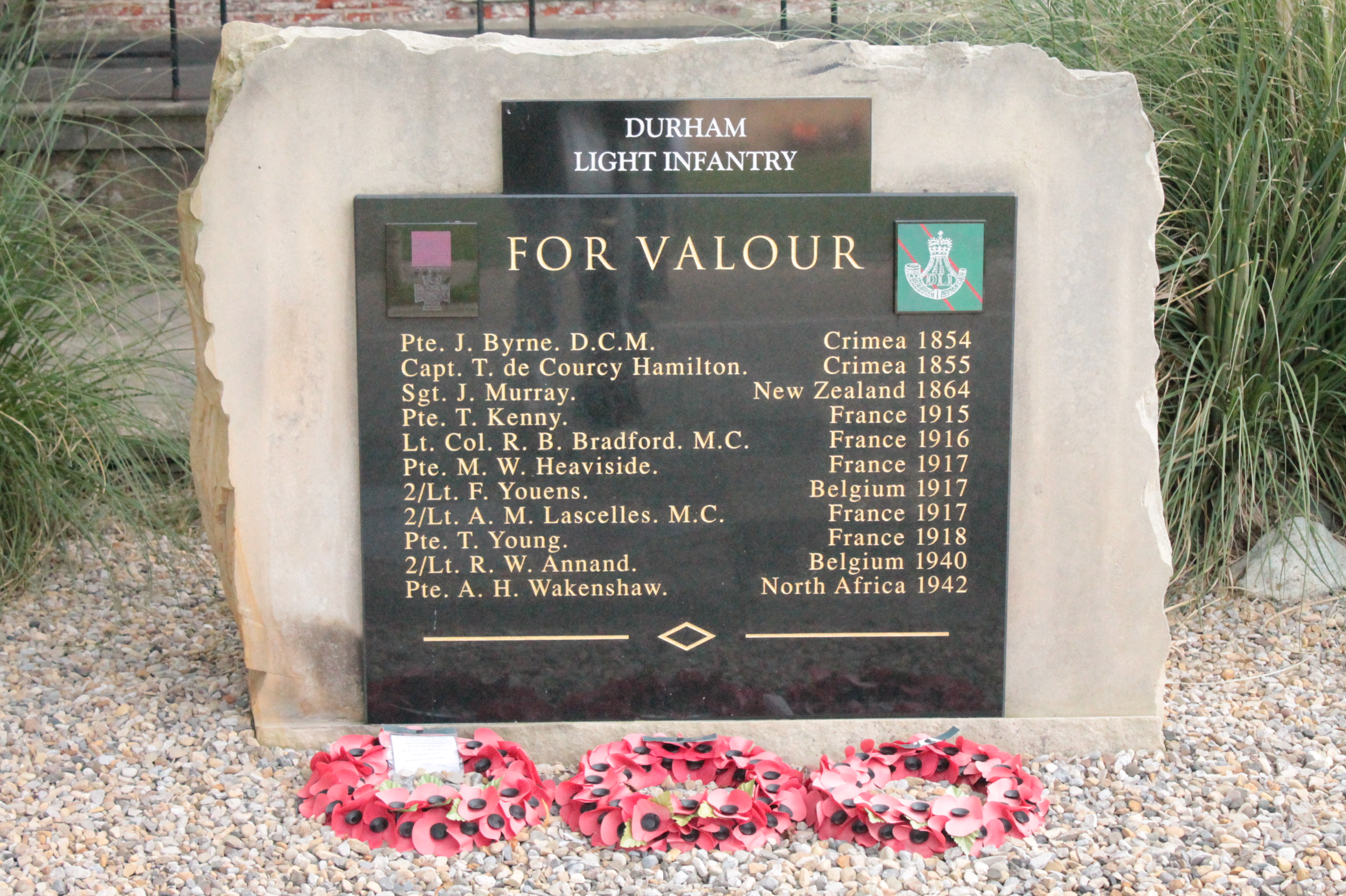
Monument to the Victoria Cross winners of the Durham Regiment, Durham Cathedral square

The following men of the 68th Regiment won the Victoria Cross.

=== Private John Byrne ===
"At the battle of Inkerman, when the regiment was ordered to retire, Private John Byrne went back towards the enemy, and, at the risk of his own life brought in a wounded soldier under fire. On 11 May 1855, he bravely engaged in hand to hand contest with one of the enemy on the parapet of the work he was defending, prevented the entrance of the enemy, killed his antagonist, and captured his arms."

=== Captain Thomas de Courcy Hamilton ===
Captain Thomas de Courcy Hamilton was 27 years old when the following deed took place for which he was awarded the VC.

"For having on the night of 11th May, 1855, during a most determined sortie, boldly charged the enemy with a small force from a battery, of which they had obtained possession in great numbers, thereby saving the works from falling into the hands of the enemy. He was conspicuous on this occasion for his gallantry and daring conduct."

=== Sgt John Murray ===
Born in Birr, County Offaly, Sgt John Murray was approximately 27 years old during the Waikato-Hauhau War, New Zealand.

"For his distinguished conduct at Te Ranga on the 21st June 1863 when the enemy's position was being stormed, in running up to a rifle-pit containing from eight to ten of the enemy, and, without any assistance, killing or wounding every one of them. He is stated to have afterwards proceeded up the works, fighting desperately and still continuing to bayonet the enemy." (Note: Saving the life of one Cpl. John Byrne V.C. in the process.)

== Battle honours ==
Salamanca, Vittoria, Pyrenees, Nivelle, Orthes, Peninsula

Alma, Inkerman, Sevastopol

New Zealand

== Colonels ==
From

68th Regiment of Foot

- April 1758 – March 1794: General John Lambton

68th (Durham) Regiment of Foot – (1782)

- March 1794 – April 1794: Major General John Mansel
- April 1794 – June 1794: Major General Thomas Dundas
- August 1794 – October 1794: Colonel Sir Alured Clarke, K.B.
- October 1794 – March 1795: Major General Hon. Charles Stuart K.B.
- March 1795 – May 1809: General Sir Thomas Trigge, K.B.

68th (Durham) Regiment of Foot (Light Infantry) – (1808)

- May 1809 – January 1813: Colonel Sir John Coape Sherbrooke G.C.B.
- January 1813 – April 1831: Major General Sir Henry Warde G.C.B.
- April 1831 – April 1838: Colonel Sir John Keane G.C.B., G.C.H.
- April 1838 – February 1844: Lieutenant General Sir William Johnston K.C.B.
- February 1844 – December 1844: Major General Sir Edward Gibbs C.B., K.C.H.
- December 1844 – January 1850: Lieutenant General Charles Nicol C.B.
- January 1850 – May 1854: Lieutenant General Douglas Mercer, C.B.
- May 1854 – June 1857: Lieutenant General Sir William Lewis Herries C.B., K.C.H.
- June 1857 – April 1864: Lieutenant General Robert Christopher Mansel, K.H.
- April 1864 – July 1881: General Lord William Paulet G.C.B.

== Bibliography ==
- Bilclife, John (1995). Well Done the 68th. The DURHAMS in the Crimea and New Zealand 1854 – 1866. Chippenham: Picton Publishing. ISBN 0948251751.
- Green, John (1827). The Vicissitudes of a Soldiers Life. Or a Series of Occurrences from 1806 to 1815. Louth: J & J Jackson.
- Reid, Stuart (2004). Wellington's Army in the Peninsula 1908–14. Oxford: Osprey Publishing. ISBN 9781841765174.
- Vane, Hon. W L (1914). The Durham Light Infantry. The United Red and White Rose. London: Gale & Polden. OCLC 7279713.
- Ward, S G P (2005) [1962]. Faithful. The Story of the Durham Light Infantry. Naval and Military Press. ISBN 978-1-84574-147-1.
