= 37th (Howitzer) Brigade Royal Field Artillery =

XXXVII (Howitzer) Brigade, Royal Field Artillery was a brigade (Note: The basic organic unit of the Royal Artillery was, and is, the Battery. When grouped together they formed brigades, in the same way that infantry battalions or cavalry regiments were grouped together in brigades. At the outbreak of World War I, a field artillery brigade of headquarters (4 officers, 37 other ranks), three batteries (5 and 193 each), and a brigade ammunition column (4 and 154) had a total strength just under 800 so was broadly comparable to an infantry battalion (just over 1,000) or a cavalry regiment (about 550). Like an infantry battalion, an artillery brigade was usually commanded by a Lieutenant-Colonel. Artillery brigades were redesignated as regiments in 1938.) of the Royal Field Artillery which served in the First World War.

It was originally formed with 31st, 35th and 55th (Howitzer) Batteries, each equipped with 4.5" howitzers, and attached to 4th Infantry Division. In August 1914 it mobilised and was sent to the Continent with the British Expeditionary Force, where it saw service with 4th Division until February 1915, when it was assigned to IV Corps. 55th Battery was withdrawn in May 1915, and assigned to 128th (Howitzer) Brigade. The Brigade joined the 7th Infantry Division in June 1915, and was broken up in May 1916.

On 20 August 1914 the Nominal Roll of Officers was: O.C. Brigade: Lt.Col. C. Battiscombe. Adjutant: Captain R.C. Dodgson. Orderly Officer: Lt R.B. Butler Stoney. Medical Officer: Captain Fraser RAMC. Veterinary Officer: Lt U.W.F. Walker AVC.

31st Battery: Major D.H. Gill. Captain M.C.J. Hartland-Mahon. Lt. A.G. Bates. 2Lt G.F. Simpson. 2Lt. Johnstone.

35th Battery: Major H.A. Koebel. Captain. E.A. Wallinger. Lt. M.A. Phillips. Lt. K.M. Agnew. Lt. L. Browning.

55th Battery. Major G.N. Cartwright. Captain J.R. Colville. Lt. P.H. Ferguson. 2Lt H.G. Hess. 2Lt S.H. Doake.

37th Brigade Ammunition Column: Captain H.M. Ballingall. Lt. F.H. Richards.

Officer i/c reinforcements: 2Lt H. W. Deacon.

In May 1916, the artillery brigades of infantry divisions were reorganised; the pure howitzer brigades were disbanded, and their batteries attached individually to field brigades, in order to produce mixed brigades of three field batteries and one howitzer battery. Accordingly, the brigade was broken up and the batteries dispersed; 31st (less one section) to 35th Brigade, and 35th (less one section) to 22nd Brigade. D (H) Battery was formed for XIV Brigade, Royal Horse Artillery on 17 May 1916 with one section (Note: A Subsection consisted of a single gun and limber drawn by six horses (with three drivers), eight gunners (riding on the limber or mounted on their own horses), and an ammunition wagon also drawn by six horses (with three drivers). Two Subsections formed a Section and in a six gun battery these would be designated as Left, Centre and Right Sections.) of 31st (H) Battery and one section of 35th (H) Battery.

A new XXVII Field Artillery Brigade was later formed in 75th Division in Egypt.

== Bibliography ==
- Becke, Archibald F. (1935). Order of Battle of Divisions Part 1–The Regular British Divisions. London: HMSO. OCLC 4405016.
- Clarke, W.G. (1993). Horse Gunners: The Royal Horse Artillery, 200 Years of Panache and Professionalism. Woolwich: The Royal Artillery Institution. ISBN 0-9520762-0-9.
