= 22nd Brigade (United Kingdom) =

Infantry brigade of the British Army in World War I and World War II

The 22nd Brigade was an infantry brigade formation of the British Army.

== First World War ==
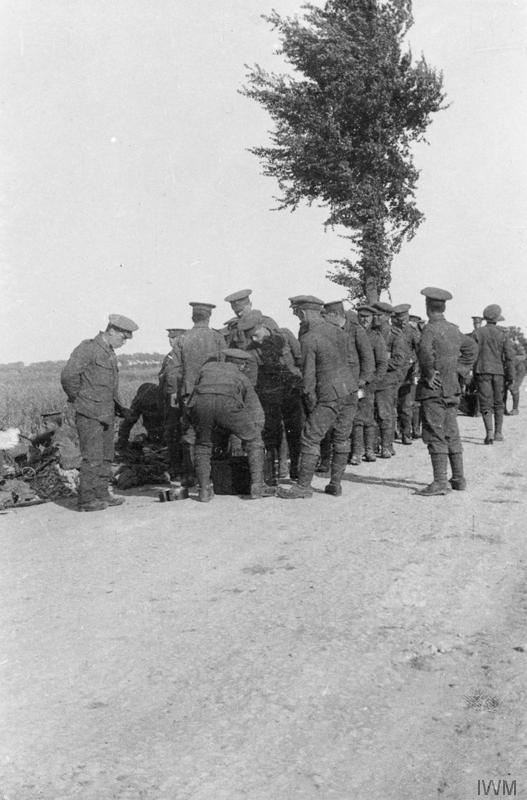
Men of the 2nd Battalion, Royal Warwickshire Regiment receiving rations while on the march in the Ypres Salient, 1915.

The brigade was a unit of the British Army during the First World War formed in September 1914, shortly after the outbreak of the Great War, from units of the Regular Army that had been serving overseas in the British Empire. The brigade was assigned to the 7th Division (nicknamed "The Immortal Seventh") and served on the Western Front and, later, on the Italian Front. After arrival in France in October 1914 the brigade fought in the First Battle of Ypres where, as most units involved in the battle, both British and German, sustained very heavy losses. As the war progressed and the more battles the brigade was involved in the composition of the brigade changed numerous times and the battalions were reinforced largely by volunteers for Lord Kitchener New Armies.

=== Order of battle ===
The infantry battalions assigned to the brigade, during the First World War, included:

- 2nd Battalion, Queen's Royal Regiment (West Surrey) (left December 1915)
- 2nd Battalion, Royal Warwickshire Regiment
- 1st Battalion, Royal Welch Fusiliers
- 1st Battalion, South Staffordshire Regiment (left December 1915)
- 1/8th Battalion, Royal Scots (from November 1914, left August 1915)
- 1/7th Battalion, King's Regiment (Liverpool) (from 15 November 1915, left 7 January 1916)
- 20th (Service) Battalion, Manchester Regiment
- 24th (Service) Battalion, Manchester Regiment
- 2nd Battalion, Royal Irish Regiment (from May 1916, left October 1916)
- 2/1st Battalion, Honourable Artillery Company (from October 1916)
- 22nd Machine Gun Company, Machine Gun Corps (formed 24 February 1916, moved to 7th Battalion, Machine Gun Corps 1 April 1918)
- 22nd Trench Mortar Battery (formed 14 April 1916)

=== Commanders ===
The following commanded the 22nd Brigade during the First World War:

- Brigadier-General S. T. B. Lawford (7 September 1914)
- Brigadier-General J. McC. Steele (27 August 1915)
- Lieutenant-Colonel B. Beauman (9 February 1918 - acting)
- Lieutenant-Colonel C. S. Burt (16 February 1918 - acting)
- Lieutenant-Colonel R. N. O'Connor (18 February 1918 - acting)
- Brigadier-General J. McC. Steele (16 March 1918)

== Second World War ==
The brigade was reformed, now designated the 22nd Infantry Brigade, during the Second World War, exactly a month after the opening of hostilities, by the redesignation of the 29th Infantry Brigade. As it was in the Great War, the brigade was composed entirely of troops of the Regular Army who had been serving in Egypt on the outbreak of war and was again assigned to the 7th Infantry Division until 3 November 1939 when it was redesignated as the 6th Infantry Division. The brigade left the 6th Division on 17 June 1940, coming under command of HQ Western Desert Force. On 2 September 1940 the 22nd Brigade was redesignated Headquarters Matruh Fortress and ceased to be an infantry brigade.

The number was subsequently reused to designate the 22nd Guards Brigade.

=== Order of battle in the Second World War ===
22nd Infantry Brigade

- 2nd Battalion, Scots Guards (left 18 March 1940)
- 1st Battalion, Buffs (Royal East Kent Regiment) (left 25 November 1939)
- 1st Battalion, Welch Regiment (from 28 November 1939, left 23 July 1940)
- 2nd Battalion, Highland Light Infantry (from 18 March, left 21 July 1940)
- 1st Battalion, South Staffordshire Regiment (from 21 July, left 1 September 1940)
- 1st Battalion, Durham Light Infantry (from 23 July, left 1 September 1940)
- 3rd Battalion, Coldstream Guards (from 25 July, left 1 September 1940)

=== Commanders ===
- Lieutenant-Colonel E.G. Earle (Acting, until 21 October 1939)
- Brigadier J.T. Leslie (from 21 October 1939 until 26 July 1940)
- Brigadier G. Dawes (from 26 July until 26 August 1940)
- Brigadier A.R. Selby (from 26 August 1940)
