= XIV Brigade, Royal Horse Artillery =

Former horse artillery brigade of the British Army

XIV Brigade, RHA
- Active: 1 March 1901 – 1 August 1913; September 1914 – May 1919
- Country: United Kingdom
- Branch: British Army
- Type: Artillery
- Size: Battalion
- Part of: 7th Division; Third Army
- Engagements: World War I Western Front Italian Front

XIV Brigade, Royal Horse Artillery was a brigade (Note: The basic organic unit of the Royal Artillery was, and is, the Battery. When grouped together they formed brigades, in the same way that infantry battalions or cavalry regiments were grouped together in brigades. At the outbreak of World War I, a field artillery brigade of headquarters (4 officers, 37 other ranks), three batteries (5 and 193 each), and a brigade ammunition column (4 and 154) had a total strength just under 800 so was broadly comparable to an infantry battalion (just over 1,000) or a cavalry regiment (about 550). Like an infantry battalion, an artillery brigade was usually commanded by a Lieutenant-Colonel. Artillery brigades were redesignated as regiments in 1938.) of the Royal Horse Artillery which existed in the early part of the 20th century. It had been dissolved before World War I but was reformed for the war. It served with 7th Division on the Western Front before becoming XIV Army Brigade, RHA in February 1917. It was disbanded at the end of the war.

== History ==
=== Formation ===
Royal Horse Artillery brigades did not exist as an organizational or operational grouping of batteries until 1 July 1859 when the Horse Brigade, Royal Artillery was formed. The brigade system was extended to five (later six) brigades when the horse artillery of the Honourable East India Company had been transferred to the British Army in 1861. These brigades were reduced to five in 1871, then to three (of 10 batteries each) in 1877 and to two (of 13 batteries each) in 1882. The brigade system was finally abolished in 1889.

As battery designations were tied to the brigade that the battery was assigned to, batteries were redesignated in a bewildering sequence as they were transferred between brigades. For example, E Battery of C Brigade (E/C Bty) might become N Battery of A Brigade (N/A Bty) upon transfer. Henceforth, batteries were designated in a single alphabetical sequence in order of seniority from date of formation.

The brigade system was revived in 1901. Each brigade now commanded just two batteries and a small staff (a Lieutenant-Colonel in command, an adjutant and a brigade sergeant major). Initially, batteries were not assigned to brigades in any particular order, but in 1906, at the insistence of Edward VII, brigades were redesignated so that batteries were roughly in order of seniority (hence I Brigade commanded A Battery and B Battery).

XIV Brigade, RHA was formed on 1 March 1901 as the IV Brigade-Division, RHA with Z Battery and AA Battery. (Note: From 1 July 1889, RHA batteries were lettered in a single alphabetical sequence in order of seniority from date of formation. When more than 26 batteries were needed, double letters were used, AA, BB, etc.) In 1903 it was redesignated as IV Brigade, RHA and was stationed at Woolwich. On 1 October 1906, it was redesignated as XIV Brigade, RHA and was dissolved on 1 August 1913. AA Battery had been disbanded on 1 May 1913 and Z battery was transferred to II Brigade, RHA at Canterbury. (Note: Frederick says I Brigade, RHA.)

=== World War I ===
==== Reformed ====
XIV Brigade, RHA was reformed in September 1914 with C Battery (from II Brigade, RHA), F Battery (from IV Brigade, RHA) and XIV RHA Brigade Ammunition Column. It joined 7th Division at Lyndhurst on formation. With 7th Division, it crossed to Belgium on 4 and 5 October 1914 (landing at Zeebrugge on 6 October) and served with the division on the Western Front until February 1917. While with the division, it saw considerable action serving at the Siege of Antwerp, the First Battle of Ypres, and in the battles of Neuve Chapelle, Aubers Ridge, Festubert, Loos, and of the Somme.

==== Changes in organization ====
On 19 October 1914, C Battery left the brigade to join XV (later IV) Brigade, RHA in 3rd Cavalry Division. It was not replaced until 21 December 1914 when T Battery joined from The Force in Egypt. On 19 June 1915, F and T batteries replaced their 13-pounders with six 18-pounders each.

57th (H) Battery, RFA joined from XXXVII (Howitzer) Brigade, RFA on 27 November 1914. It returned to XXXVII (H) Brigade on 2 March 1915.

D (H)/XIV Battery was formed on 17 May 1916 with one section (Note: A Subsection consisted of a single gun and limber drawn by six horses (with three drivers), eight gunners (riding on the limber or mounted on their own horses), and an ammunition wagon also drawn by six horses (with three drivers). Two Subsections formed a Section and in a six gun battery these would be designated as Left, Centre and Right Sections.) of 31st (H) Battery and one section of 35th (H) Battery (both of XXXVII (H) Brigade, RFA).

On 7 October 1916, 509th (H) Battery (four 4.5-inch howitzers) joined the brigade. On 13 February 1917 it was broken up to make up 31st (H) and 35th (H) batteries to six howitzers each. (Note: Surprisingly, D(H)/XIV Battery was not broken up and returned to its original batteries.)

==== Army brigade ====
On 10 February 1917, the brigade left 7th Division and became XIV Army Brigade, RHA. (Note: Army Brigades, RHA and RFA were artillery brigades that were excess to the needs of the divisions, withdrawn to form an artillery reserve.) On 13 February, B Battery of CLXIX Brigade, RFA (B/CLXIX Battery) joined as C/XIV and one section of C(H)/CLXIX Battery, RFA made up D(H)/XIV Battery to six 4.5-inch howitzers. C/XIV Battery was later redesignated as 400th Battery and D(H)/XIV as 401st (H) Battery.

The brigade moved to Italy in December 1917, before returning to the Western Front in March 1918. At the Armistice, it was serving as Army Troops with the Third Army with F Battery RHA, T Battery RHA, 400th Battery RFA and 401st (H) Battery RFA (eighteen 18-pounders and six 4.5-inch howitzers).

The brigade was disbanded in Germany in May 1919. 400th and 401st (H) batteries were disbanded, F Battery joined III Brigade, RHA and T Battery joined IX Brigade, RHA, both in the United Kingdom.

== See also ==
- 14th Regiment, Royal Horse Artillery for a similarly numbered regiment in World War II.

== Bibliography ==
- Becke, Archibald F. (1935). Order of Battle of Divisions Part 1–The Regular British Divisions. London: HMSO. OCLC 4405016.
- Clarke, W.G. (1993). Horse Gunners: The Royal Horse Artillery, 200 Years of Panache and Professionalism. Woolwich: The Royal Artillery Institution. ISBN 09520762-0-9.
- Frederick, J.B.M. (1984). Lineage Book of British Land Forces 1660–1978. Wakefield, Yorkshire: Microform Academic Publishers. ISBN 1-85117-009-X.
- Perry, F.W. (1993). Order of Battle of Divisions Part 5B. Indian Army Divisions. Newport: Ray Westlake Military Books. ISBN 1-871167-23-X.
- Order of Battle of the British Armies in France, November 11th, 1918. France: General Staff, GHQ. 1918.
