= Julian Steele (British Army officer) =

British Army officer

Major-General Julian Steele CB CMG DSO*
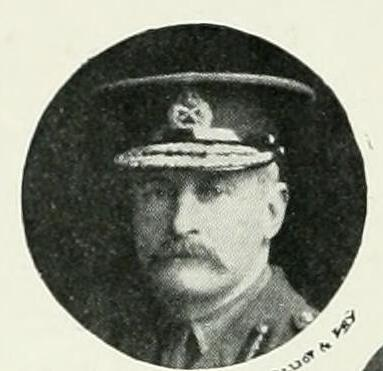
- Born: c. 1870
- Died: 13 March 1926 (aged 55−56)
- Military career
- Allegiance: United Kingdom
- Branch: British Army
- Service years: 1890–1924
- Rank: Major-General
- Unit: Coldstream Guards
- Commands: 22nd Brigade; 7th Division
- Conflicts: Second Boer War; First World War
- Awards: Companion of the Order of the Bath; Companion of the Order of St Michael and St George; Distinguished Service Order

Major-General Julian McCarty Steele, CB, CMG, DSO & Bar (c. 1870 – 13 March 1926) was a British Army officer who briefly commanded the 7th Infantry Division during the First World War.

== Military career ==
Educated at the Royal Military College, Sandhurst, Steele was commissioned into the Coldstream Guards on 29 October 1890. He served as adjutant of his regiment in the late 1890s, was promoted to lieutenant on 24 June 1896 and to captain on 1 April 1899. He subsequently saw action in the Second Boer War for which he received a brevet rank of major on 29 November 1900 and was appointed a Companion of the Distinguished Service Order (DSO) in October 1901.

After returning home from South Africa, he was posted to the Guards depôt at Caterham, Surrey, where he was appointed commanding officer 1 March 1903. He was promoted to major in October 1906.

After being promoted to the temporary rank of brigadier general in August 1915, commanded the 22nd Infantry Brigade during the First World War. He was appointed a Companion of the Order of the Bath in the 1918 New Year Honours and briefly commanded the 7th Division, the 22nd Brigade's parent formation, in Italy between 9 February 1918 and 22 March 1918. He was also awarded a bar to his Distinguished Service Order in January 1919.

After the war he served as commander of the 1st Guards Brigade at Aldershot Garrison from 1920 to 1924. He was promoted to major general on 1 January 1925.
