= John Sontag (British Army officer) =

British Army officer

Lieutenant-General John Sontag
- Born: 27 October 1747; The Hague, Netherlands
- Died: 4 May 1816 (aged 68); Earl's Court, United Kingdom
- Military career
- Allegiance: United Kingdom
- Branch: British Army
- Service years: 1780–1792; 1793–1816
- Rank: Lieutenant-General
- Nickname: General Ney
- Units: 12th Light Dragoons; The Guides
- Commands: Military Hospitals in the Netherlands; Military Hospitals in South Britain; Commandant of Lisbon; 4th Brigade; Commandant of Middleburg; 3rd Brigade, Cadiz; Brigade, 7th Division; 7th Division
- Conflicts: French Revolutionary Wars; Flanders campaign; Siege of Valenciennes; Battle of Lincelles; Siege of Dunkirk; West Indies campaign; Capture of St Lucia; Capture of St Vincent; Anglo-Russian invasion of Holland; Battle of Alkmaar (WIA); Napoleonic Wars; Battle of Eylau; Walcheren campaign; Peninsular War; Corunna campaign; Lines of Torres Vedras; Battle of Fuentes de Oñoro; Siege of Badajoz

Lieutenant-General John Salomon Balthasar Sontag was a British Army officer who briefly served as General Officer Commanding the 7th Division during the Peninsular War.

== Military career ==
Sontag was born the son of Johan Wilhelm Philip Sontag and his wife, Anna Hoek, in The Hague.

He joined the British Army in 1779 and was naturalised as a British citizen in February 1780. He became aide-de-camp to General Ralph Abercromby in 1795 and accompanied Abercromby during his expedition to the West Indies in 1796 and during the Anglo-Russian invasion of Holland in 1799. He also saw action during the Walcheren Campaign and became Military Governor of Middelburg in August 1809; General George Don then appointed him Head of the Provisional Government of Walcheren in November 1809. He left when the British Forces withdrew from Walcheren in December 1809.

He served as temporary General Officer Commanding the 7th Division in Spain during the Peninsular War from 1 August 1811 until relinquishing his position, due to ill health, in October 1811.
