= John Murray (Irish soldier) =

John Murray VC
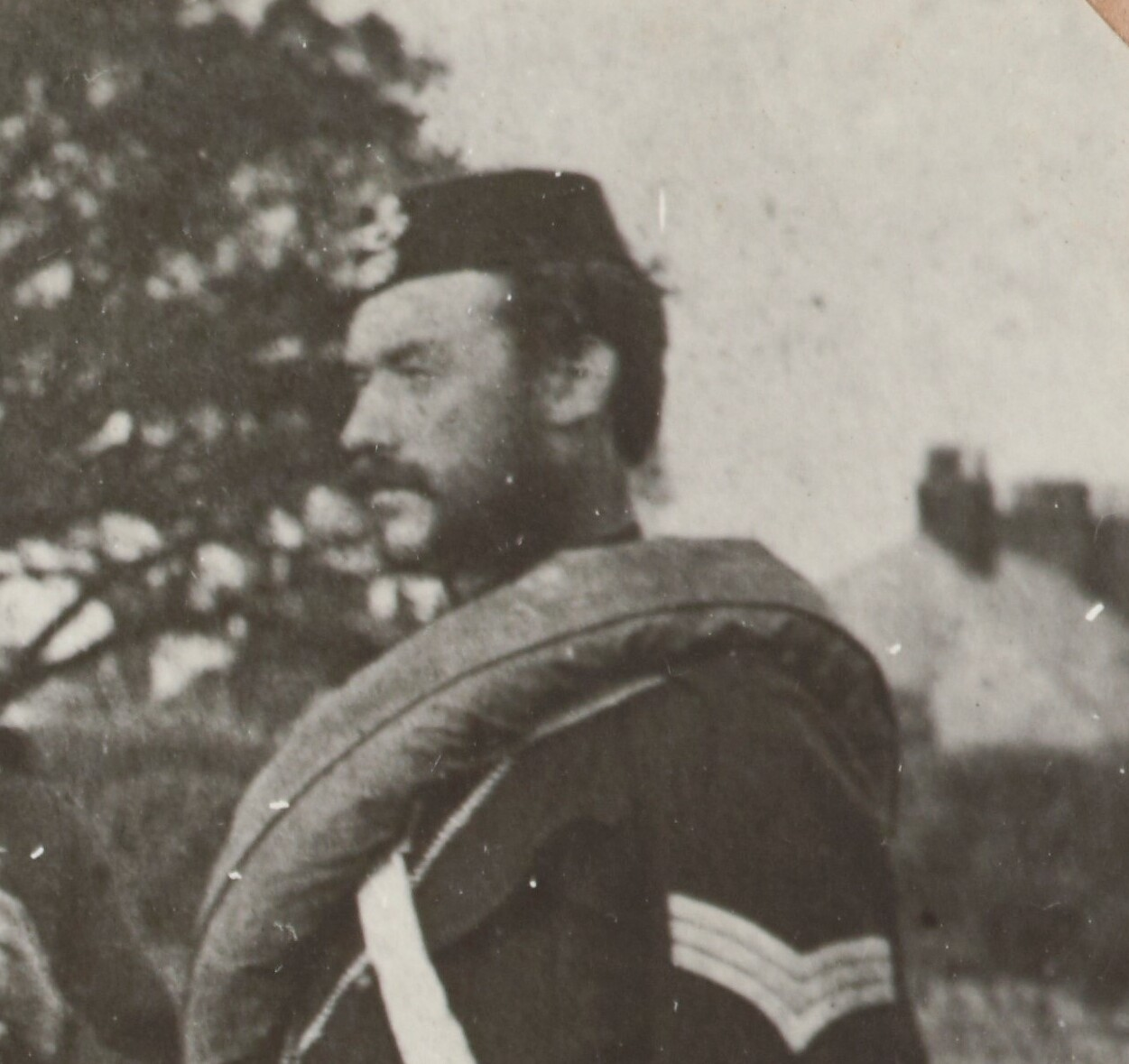
- Born: 1837; Birr, County Offaly
- Died: 7 November 1911 (aged 73–74); Derrinlogh, County Offaly
- Burial place: Eglish Churchyard, County Offaly
- Military career
- Allegiance: United Kingdom
- Branch: British Army
- Service years: 1852–1873
- Rank: Sergeant
- Units: 68th (Durham) Regiment of Foot (Light Infantry)
- Conflicts: Crimean War; New Zealand Wars
- Awards: Victoria Cross Crimea Medal, Sebastopol, Inkermann, Balaclava, Alma clasps Long Service & Good Conduct Medal; Turkish Crimea Medal Visit to Ireland Medal, 1900

John Murray VC (February 1837 – 7 November 1911) was a British Army soldier and an Irish recipient of the Victoria Cross, the highest award for gallantry in the face of the enemy that can be awarded to British and Commonwealth forces.

== Early life ==
Murray was born in Birr, County Offaly, in February 1837.

== Victoria Cross ==
Sergeant John Murray, 68th (Durham) Regiment of Foot (Light Infantry), was approximately 27 years old during the Waikato-Hauhau Maori War in New Zealand when the following deed took place on 21 June 1864 at Tauranga for which he was awarded the Victoria Cross (VC):

For his distinguished conduct during the engagement at Tauranga, on the 21st of June, when the Enemy's position was being stormed, in running up to a Rifle Pit containing from eight to ten of the enemy, and, without any assistance, killing or wounding every one of them.
He is stated to have afterwards proceeded up the works, fighting desperately, and still continuing to bayonet the Enemy.

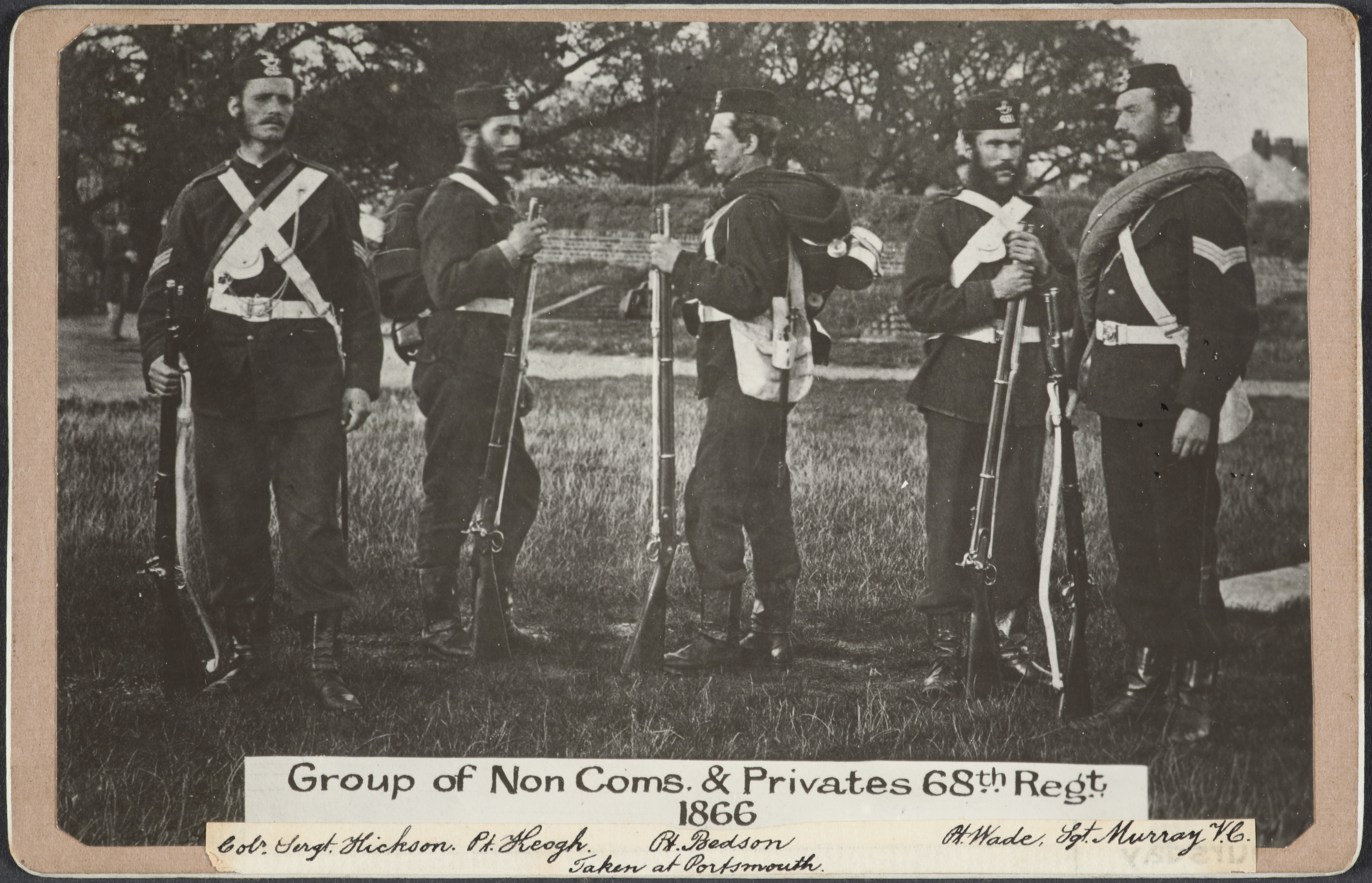
Sgt. Murray, VC and others from the 68th (Durham) Regiment of Foot, 1866

== Further information ==
Murray died at Derrinlogh in County Offaly on 7 November 1911.

== The medal ==
His Victoria Cross is displayed at the Durham Light Infantry Museum & Durham Art Gallery in Durham, England.
