= Chasseurs Britanniques =

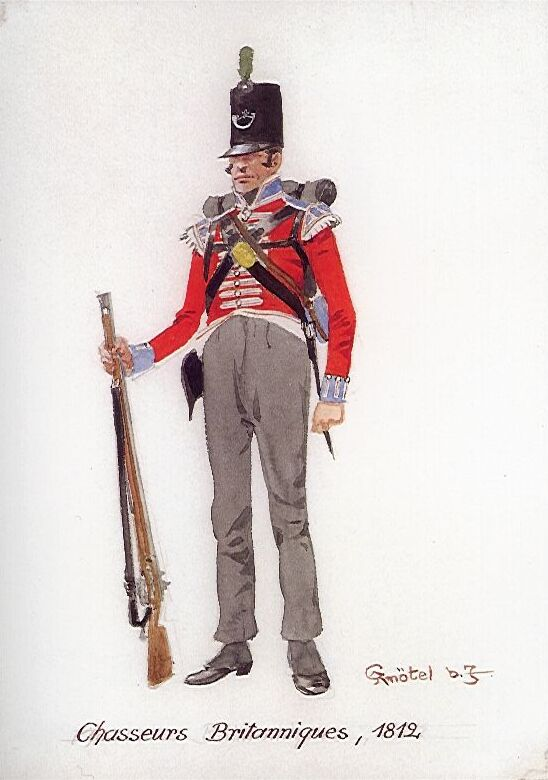
- A regimental private in 1812
- Active: 1801–1814
- Country: United Kingdom
- Branch: British Army
- Type: Light infantry
- Size: One battalion
- Colors: Scarlet with white facings and blue collars
- Engagements: French Revolutionary Wars; Napoleonic Wars; War of 1812

Commanders
- Colonel of the Regiment: Colonel John Ramsey

The Chasseurs Britanniques was a light infantry regiment of the British Army which served in the French Revolutionary and Napoleonic Wars. It was formed from remnants of the Army of Condé after the unit disbanded in 1800. The regiment was raised in 1801 and continued to exist until 1814, when it was disbanded after Napoleon's first abdication and exile to Elba.

== Origin of the Chasseurs Britanniques ==
With the start of the French Revolution, French Royalist forces were raised to fight the French Revolutionary Armies. Mostly, these were made up of émigrés returning to fight for the deposed monarch. Three small armies were formed. One of these, raised by Prince of Condé, operated on the Upper Rhine. Initially operating with the Austrians, the Army of Condé served under Russia before entering British service.

== In British service ==
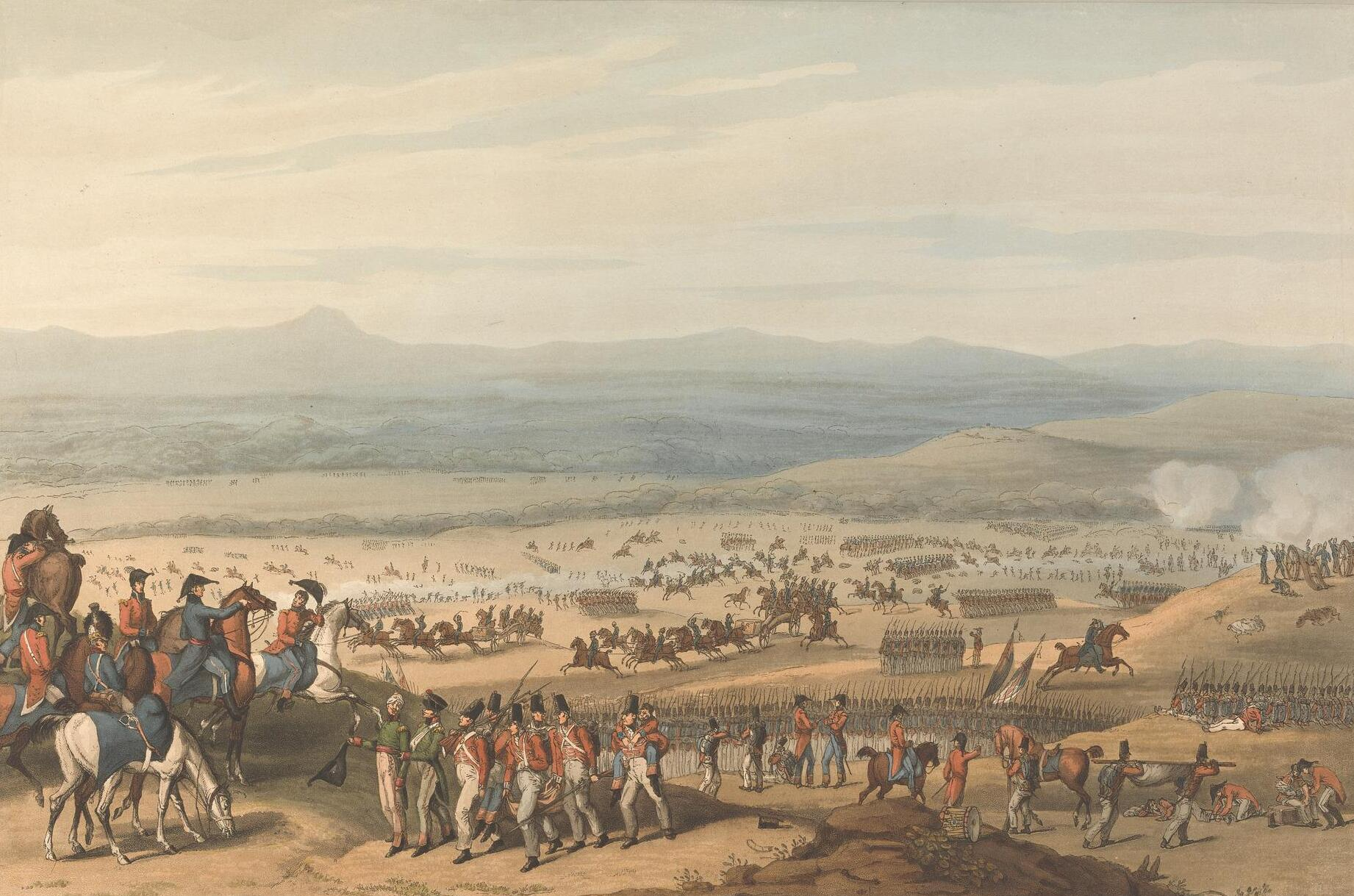
The Battle of Fuentes de Oñoro, which the Chasseurs Britanniques fought in

Initially, the Chasseurs were composed of French émigrés. As the Napoleonic wars continued, the ranks of the Chasseurs were replenished mainly from deserters from the French Army. In British service, the Chasseurs Britanniques earned a reputation for fighting well in battle. However, they had an equal reputation for desertion, so much so that they could not be trusted to act as picquets when in camp. In 1813 alone, the Chasseurs had 224 deserters from a total strength of approximately 1,740 men. Within three years of joining Wellington's army, nearly half of the Chasseurs had deserted.

After being accepted into British service, the royalists' first chance in battle as the Chasseurs Britanniques came in 1801 during the Egyptian campaign. Under the command of Colonel John Ramsey, they took part in the Siege of Alexandria. Following the Egyptian campaign, the Chasseurs were withdrawn, first to Malta and then to the Isle of Wight. Captain Thomas Pressland, HMS Regulus at Spithead reports to the Admiralty 10 March 1803, his arrival after 41 days from Alexandria with dispatches from Malta from Rear Admiral Sir Richard Bickerton and with the regiment of Chasseurs Britainniques, 570 persons “all in perfect health not having had a sick man in the ship since we sailed from thence”

In 1803, while on the Isle of Wight, the Chasseurs Britanniques were brought back up to war-strength with another influx of émigrés. From there, the Chasseurs were sent to Naples, before being withdrawn to Sicily with the rest of the British forces in 1806. The Chasseurs were assigned to Major General John Stuart's expedition to Italy in 1806. Although they were not present at the Battle of Maida, the Chasseurs took part in the capture of Reggio Calabria on 9 July 1806, where they were able to entice 300 French prisoners to join their ranks. In 1810, the Chasseurs Britanniques received orders to join Wellington's army in the Peninsula. Arriving in Lisbon in January 1811, the Chasseurs joined Wellington's command in March. They served in the 2nd Brigade of the Seventh Division. As part of Wellington's Army, they saw action in many of the major engagements of Peninsular campaign from 1811 to 1814, including the battles of Fuentes de Oñoro, Ciudad Rodrigo, Salamanca and Vitoria, as well as the fighting in the Pyrenees.

The Chasseurs' final major battle was Orthez. They were then assigned to escort the Duke of Angoulême to Bordeaux, where they discovered that the city had turned Royalist and welcomed the Duke and his escort. While most of the Chasseurs served as line infantry under Wellington, a detachment of the Chasseurs Britanniques received orders to report to the ship of the line HMS Ramillies. The detachment was present aboard ship for the Battle of Baltimore, but does not appear to have been part of the landing which culminated in the Burning of Washington. With the end of hostilities after Napoleon's first abdication and exile to Elba, the Chasseurs Britanniques were withdrawn from France and brought back to Great Britain. The corps was disbanded on 5 October 1814.

== Uniform and traditions ==
The Chasseurs Britanniques were originally uniformed in green coats with yellow facings, with grey trousers. Their equipment was all Russian in pattern as, prior to entering British service, the battalion had been in Russian service. The Chasseurs continued to wear this uniform until they were stationed on the Isle of Wight. There, the uniform was brought in line with the rest of the British Army. The green and yellow coats were replaced by red coats with light blue facings, and white trousers. Officers' uniforms included silver lace, while the other ranks had blue and white piping. The uniform was topped off with a black shako with a plume. Grenadier companies wore white plumes, while the light companies had a green plume. The officers wore bicorne hats. As with many light infantry battalions, the Chasseurs had no colours.

== Reenactement ==
The Chasseurs Britanniques are the unit that a group of French re-enactors based at Colmar in Eastern France represent since 2014.

== Books ==
- Chartrand, Rene (2000). Emigre and Foreign Troops In British Service (2): 1803–1815. Oxford: Osprey. p. 3.
- Nichols, Alistair (2005). Wellington's Mongrel Regiment. A History of the Chasseurs Britanniques Regiment 1801-1814. Spellmount.
