= 7th Infantry Division (United Kingdom) =

British Army unit

7th Division 7th Infantry Division
- The divisional insignia during the First World War (1916 onwards)
- Active: 1811 - 1814; 1900 - 1902; 1914 - 1919; 1938 - 1939
- Country: United Kingdom
- Branch: British Army
- Nicknames: The Mongrels (Peninsular War); The Immortal Seventh (First World War)
- Engagements: Napoleonic War; Peninsula War; Second Boer War; Battle of Poplar Grove; First World War; First Battle of Ypres; Battle of Neuve Chapelle; Battle of Aubers Ridge; Battle of Festubert; Battle of Loos; Battle of the Somme; Battle of Passchendaele; Battle of Vittorio Veneto; Siege of Antwerp; Arab revolt; Second World War

The 7th Infantry Division was an infantry division of the British Army, first established by The Duke of Wellington as part of the Anglo-Portuguese Army for service in the Peninsular War, and was active also during the First World War from 1914 to 1919, and briefly in the Second World War in 1939.

== Peninsular War ==
During the French Revolutionary Wars and early in the Napoleonic Wars, the largest permanent organised structure within the British Army was the brigade. The brigade, which consisted of two or more battalions grouped together under the command of a major-general, suited the small size of the army and the operations that it conducted. When needed, larger forces were organised on an ad hoc basis. This included multiple brigades grouped into 'lines' or 'columns'. As the army and its operations grew, it implemented divisions—a single formation of two or more brigades, usually commanded by a lieutenant-general. The division concept was not new and had been used by other European armies towards the end of the Seven Years' War (1756–1763). On 18 June 1809, Lieutenant-General Arthur Wellesley, commander of British forces in Spain and Portugal during the Peninsular War, reorganised his force into four divisions. The following year, with the further expansion of his force, Wellington created the 7th Division. It consisted of British, German, Portuguese, and French troops. Due to the mixture of nationalities as well as line and light regiments, the division had a multitude of uniforms. This coined the nickname of The Mongrels.

The division was present at the Battle of Fuentes de Oñoro the Battle of Vitoria the Battle of the Pyrenees the Battle of Nivelle the Battle of the Nive and the Battle of Orthez.

== Second Boer War ==
The 7th Division was re-activated during the Second Boer War. The division took part in the Battle of Poplar Grove (March 1900) and the following occupation of Bloemfontein, then took part in Lord Roberts′ march to Pretoria.

== First World War ==
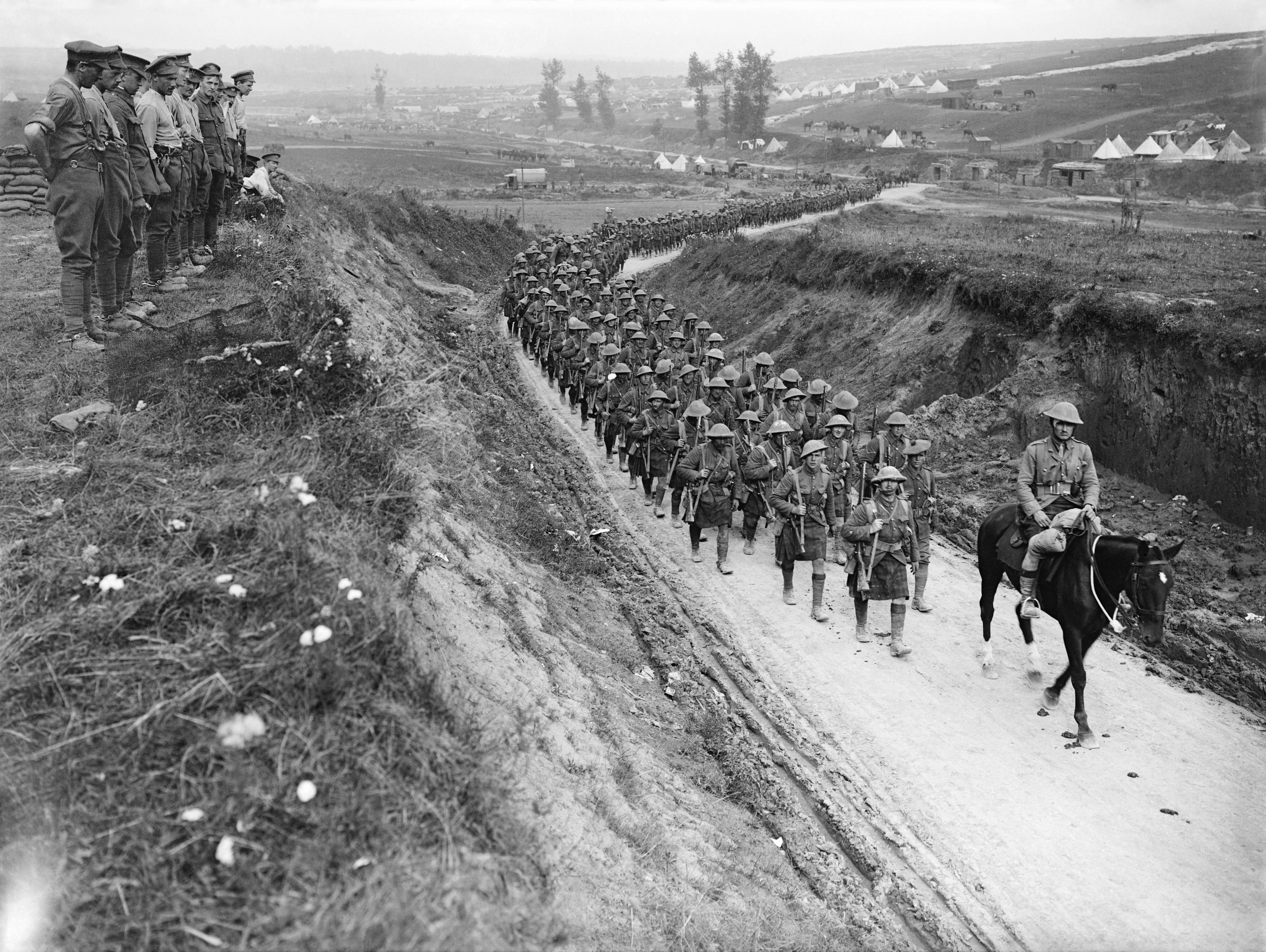
Column of the 2nd Battalion, Gordon Highlanders marching to the trenches along the Becordel–Fricourt road, France, October 1916.

The 7th Division was a Regular Army formation that was formed in September 1914 by combining units returning from garrison outposts in the British Empire at the outbreak of the First World War the previous month. During the war, the division fought in the First Battle of Ypres, the Battle of Neuve Chapelle, the Battle of Aubers Ridge, the Battle of Festubert, the Battle of Loos, the Battle of the Somme, the Battle of Passchendaele, and the Battle of Vittorio Veneto.

The division landed at Zeebrugge in Belgium on 6 October 1914 in an attempt to support the Belgian Army's defence of Antwerp, but was soon forced to retreat south-west as that city fell a few days later. It then played a crucial part in the stabilisation of the front during the First Battle of Ypres, preventing a German breakthrough, although at a high cost in terms of casualties. A floating division, the 7th was the first British Division to enter Ypres on 14 October. It was ordered to hold the line, while Field Marshal French brought up his remaining six divisions and redeployed them from the Aisne to the sea. The division held an 8 mile front for two weeks, opposite some 340,000 Germans. Some 18,000 soldiers strong on 15 October, the 7th left the line on 31 October, with just 2,000 troops remaining, mostly transport and supply.

The 7th Division fought in most of the major battles on the Western Front through to 1917 before being sent to the Italian Front for the remainder of the war. At the battle of Loos in late 1915, the division's General Officer Commanding (GOC), Major-General Thompson Capper, was killed in action at the height of the fighting. Unlike the first six regular divisions of the British Expeditionary Force (BEF), a third of whose strength was made up of regular reservists, the 7th Division was originally composed entirely of serving regular soldiers, which gave rise to the division's nickname, 'The Immortal Seventh'.

== Arab Revolt ==
In 1936, the Arab Revolt broke out in the British Mandate of Palestine. British troops were dispatched, ending the first phase of the war by the close of the year. Fighting soon resumed and reached its zenith during the summer of 1938. With rising tensions in Europe, the British began to withdraw troops from Palestine for use elsewhere. The conclusion of the Munich Agreement—on 30 September 1938—calmed the rising tensions in Europe and averted war, allowing the British to resume their military build-up in Palestine.

The 7th Division was reformed the following month, and placed under the command of Major-General Richard O'Connor. The division was deployed to Palestine on internal security duties as part of a build-up of 18,500 men in the region. This force then began to suppress the revolt. Meanwhile, Palestinian guerrillas had overrun the Old City of Jerusalem. O'Connor's men proceeded to sweep the area, declaring the Old City free of militants on 19 October. The same day, the division seized Acre and by the end of the month were clearing Jaffa of rebels. Many Palestinians were detained and rebel activity significantly dropped off in the area. In the north, the 8th Infantry Division, under Major-General Bernard Montgomery, and Special Night Squads engaged in counter-terror operations, with O'Connor writing that one brigadier "always encouraged his men to be brutal". General Officer Commanding (GOC) British Forces in Palestine and Trans-Jordan Robert Haining wrote in late 1938 that "unnecessary violence, vindictiveness ..., [and] killing in cold blood" had to be curbed. O'Connor was likewise opposed to the measures in the north, and wrote "harshness and unnecessary violence on the part of our soldiers" had to be curbed. During the operation in Jerusalem, only four to nineteen guerrillas were killed. In early 1939, the revolt finally came to an end. (Note: Montgomery's 8th Division launched a major operation that defeated the rebels on a military level. On a political level, the British Government drew up the White Paper of 1939 conceding to the demands of the Arab Higher Committee: "Self-government—an Arab-controlled Palestine—would be implemented within 10 years and in the meantime Jewish immigration would cease after five years.")

== Second World War ==
On 31 August, just prior to the war beginning, the headquarters of the 7th Infantry Division relinquished command of all its troops. O'Connor and the divisional staff then left Jerusalem bound for Cairo, Egypt. From Cairo, the men moved forward to Mersa Matruh arriving on 7 September. The headquarters was then assigned all troops based there, with the exception of the 7th Armoured Division. The British Official Historian, I. S. O. Playfair, comments that this decision was undertaken to relieve the burden on Lieutenant-General Henry Maitland Wilson, GOC British Troops in Egypt, of "direct control of operations which had been his in addition to the command of all troops in Egypt". Due to the logistical problems in maintaining substantial forces across the Western Desert and on the Libya–Egypt border, Mersa Matruh was the forward British base of operations and supplied by rail. Positioned 200 miles (320 km) west of Alexandria and 120 miles (190 km) from the border, the location had been chosen to shield forward Royal Air Force (RAF) landing strips behind it and to defend the Nile Delta. Mersa Matruh also offered the British the strategy of drawing Italian or other forces forward to them, to allow a counter-attack after they ran into supply difficulties. On 3 November, the division was renamed the 6th Infantry Division.

== General officers commanding ==
General officer commanding
Appointment date	Rank	General officer commanding	Notes	Source(s)
5 March 1811	Major-General	William Houston	The division was formed in Portugal, for service in the Peninsular War.	
1 August 1811	Major-General	John Sontag	Temporary commander; relinquished position due to ill health in October	
October 1811	Lieutenant-General	Carl von Alten		
2 May 1812	Major-General	John Hope		
23 September 1812	Major-General	John de Bernewitz		
25 October 1812	Lieutenant-General	George Ramsay		
9 October 1813	Major-General	Carlos Lecor		
18 November 1813	Major-General	George Walker	Temporary commander; relinquished position on 27 February 1814	
February/March 1814	Major-General	George Ramsay	At the conclusion of the Peninsular War, in 1814, the division was disbanded in France. The final troops departed in June.	
24 August 1815	Major-General	Sir Thomas Brisbane	The division was merged into the Army of Occupation in France on 30 November.	
December 1899	Lieutenant-General	Charles Tucker	The division was mobilized in the United Kingdom for service in the Second Boer War. Tucker maintained command through to the end of 1900 when, while still in southern Africa, the division was broken-up.	
23 June 1902	Major-General	Gerald Morton	The division was reformed in Ireland. Morton died in office	
30 April 1906	Major-General	Herbert Plumer	In 1907, the division was renumbered as the 5th Division	
27 August 1914	Major-General	Thompson Capper	The division was formed in Lyndhurst, Hampshire, for service in the First World War. Capper was wounded in action on 1 April 1915.	
6 April 1915	Brigadier-General	Sydney Lawford	Acting commander	
19 April 1915	Major-General	Hubert Gough		
14 July 1915	Brigadier-General	Sydney Lawford	Acting commander	
19 July 1915	Major-General	Thompson Capper	Capper died of his wounds on 27 September 1915	
26 September 1915	Brigadier-General	Herbert Watts	Acting commander	
27 September 1915	Major-General	Herbert Watts		
7 January 1917	Major-General	George Barrow		
1 April 1917	Major-General	Herbert Shoubridge	Left division on sick leave on 9 February 1918	
9 February 1918	Brigadier-General	Julian Steele	Acting commander	
22 March 1918	Major-General	Herbert Shoubridge	The division demobilised in Italy, following the conclusion of hostilities in 1919.	
29 September 1938	Major-General	Richard O'Connor	The division was reformed in Palestine, for service during the Arab revolt. The division was renumbered as the 6th Infantry Division on 3 November 1939.	

== Victoria Cross recipients ==
Date of action	Rank	Name	Unit	Place of action	Country of action	Sources +Victoria Cross recipients
23 October 1914	Drummer	William Kenny	Gordon Highlanders	Ypres	Belgium	
29 October 1914	Lieutenant	James Brooke	Gordon Highlanders	Gheluvelt	Belgium	
7 November 1914	Captain	John Vallentin	South Staffordshire Regiment	Zillebeke	Belgium	
19 December 1914	Private	James MacKenzie	Scots Guards	Rouges Bancs	France	
21 December 1914	Private	Abraham Acton	Border Regiment	Rouges Bancs	France	
21 December 1914	Private	James Smith	Border Regiment	Rouges Bancs	France	
12 March 1915	Captain	Charles Foss	Bedfordshire Regiment	Neuve Chapelle	France	
12 March 1915	Corporal	William Anderson	Green Howards	Neuve Chapelle	France	
12 March 1915	Private	Edward Barber	Grenadier Guards	Neuve Chapelle	France	
12 March 1915	Lance-Corporal	Wilfred Fuller	Grenadier Guards	Neuve Chapelle	France	
12 June 1915	Lance-Corporal	William Angus	Highland Light Infantry	Givenchy	France	(Note: The divisional history lists Angus as a private, whereas the Gazette states that he was a lance-corporal.)
16 May 1915	Company Sergeant-Major	Frederick Barter	Royal Welsh Fusiliers	Festubert	France	
25 September 1915	Private	Arthur Vickers	Royal Warwickshire Regiment	Hulloch	France	
20 July 1916	Private	Theodore Veale	Devonshire Regiment	High Wood	France	

== Orders of battle ==
=== Peninsular War ===
During this period, brigades were referred to by their commander's names. Due to changes in command, the brigade names fluctuated frequently.

7th Division (1811–1814)

Division's first brigade:

- 1st Light Battalion, King's German Legion (until 6 December 1812)
- 2nd Light Battalion, King's German Legion (until 6 December 1812)
- Brunswick Oels
- 1st Battalion, 6th (1st Warwickshire) Regiment (from 6 December 1812)
- 3rd Provisional Battalion (2nd Battalion, 24th Regiment of Foot and 2nd Battalion, 58th Regiment of Foot Regiments of Foot) (from December 1812)

Division's second brigade:

- 51st (2nd Yorkshire West Riding) Regiment of Foot (Light Infantry)
- 85th (Bucks Volunteers) Regiment of Foot (Light Infantry) (until October 1811)
- 68th (Durham) Regiment of Foot (Light Infantry) (from 19 July 1811)
- 1st Battalion, 82nd Regiment of Foot (Prince of Wales's Volunteers) (from 28 November 1812)
- Chasseurs Britanniques

Portuguese brigade (attached):

- 7th Line Regiment
- 19th Line Regiment
- 2nd Caçadores

Militia brigade (attached 1814, but arrived after the Peninsular War had drawn to a close) (Note: The 1st battalion was largely drawn from the Royal Buckinghamshire Militia (King's Own), but also contained detachments from the Northampton, Wiltshire, Worcester, and the 1st and 2nd Surrey Militias. The 2nd Battalion drew from the Royal West Middlesex Militia, and the third from the Royal Denbigh Rifles.)

- 1st Provisional Battalion
- 2nd Provisional Battalion
- 3rd Provisional Battalion

=== Second Boer War ===
7th Division (1899–1900)

14th Brigade

- 2nd Battalion, Norfolk Regiment
- 2nd Battalion, Lincolnshire Regiment
- 1st Battalion, King's Own Scottish Borderers
- 2nd Battalion, Hampshire Regiment
- 26th Transport Company, Army Service Corps (partial)
- 14th Brigade Bearer Company
- 14th Brigade Field Hospital

15th Brigade

- 2nd Battalion, Cheshire Regiment
- 2nd Battalion, South Wales Borderers
- 1st Battalion, East Lancashire Regiment
- 2nd Battalion, North Staffordshire Regiment
- 26th Transport Company, Army Service Corps (partial)
- 15th Brigade Bearer Company
- 15th Brigade Field Hospital

Divisional artillery, Royal Field Artillery

- 18th Field Battery
- 62nd Field Battery
- 75th Field Battery
- Ammunition column
- 83rd Field Battery (during the course of 1900, the above three batteries were replaced by these three)
- 84th Field Battery
- 85th Field Battery

Divisional Cavalry

- 1st Company, City of London Imperial volunteers Mounted Infantry (by April 1900)

Royal Engineers

- 9th Field Company (left before April 1900)
- 26th Field Company (by April 1900)

=== First World War ===
7th Division (1914–1918)

20th Brigade

- 1st Battalion, Grenadier Guards (until 4 August 1915)
- 2nd Battalion, Scots Guards (until 8 August 1915)
- 2nd Battalion, Border Regiment
- 2nd Battalion, Gordon Highlanders
- 1/6th Battalion, Gordon Highlanders (from 5 December 1914, until 5 January 1916)
- 8th (Service) Battalion, Devonshire Regiment (from 4 August 1915)
- 9th (Service) Battalion, Devonshire Regiment (from 8 August 1915, until 13 September 1918)
- 6th Battalion, Cheshire Regiment (joined 9 January 1916, until 25 February 1916)
- 20th Brigade Machine Gun Company (formed 10 February 1916, until 1 April 1918)
- 20th Trench Mortar Battery (formed 14 February 1916)

21st Brigade (until 19 December 1915)

- 2nd Battalion, Bedfordshire Regiment
- 2nd Battalion, Green Howards
- 2nd Battalion, Royal Scots Fusiliers
- 2nd Battalion, Duke of Edinburgh's (Wiltshire Regiment)
- 1/4th Battalion, Queen's Own Cameron Highlanders (from 8 April 1915)

22nd Brigade

- 2nd Battalion, The Queen's (Royal West Surrey) Regiment (left December 1915)
- 2nd Battalion, Royal Warwickshire Regiment
- 1st Battalion, Royal Welch Fusiliers
- 1st Battalion, South Staffordshire Regiment (left December 1915)
- 1/8th Battalion, Royal Scots (Lothian Regiment) (from 12 November 1914, until 19 August 1915)
- 1/7th Battalion, King's (Liverpool Regiment) (from 11 November 1915, until 7 January 1916)
- 20th (Service) Battalion (5th City), Manchester Regiment (from 20 December 1915, until 13 September 1918)
- 2nd Battalion, The Royal Irish Regiment (from 22 May 1916, until 14 October 1916)
- 22nd Brigade Machine Gun Company (formed 24 February 1916, until 1 April 1918)
- 22nd Trench Mortar Battery (formed 14 April 1916)
- 24th (Service) Battalion (Oldham), Manchester Regiment (from 20 December 1915, until 22 May 1916)
- 2/1st Battalion, Honourable Artillery Company (from 6 October 1916)

91st Brigade (from 20 December 1915)

- 2nd Battalion, Queen's (Royal West Surrey Regiment)
- 1st Battalion, South Staffordshire Regiment
- 21st (Service) Battalion (6th City), Manchester Regiment (until 13 September 1918)
- 22nd (Service) Battalion (7th City), Manchester Regiment
- 91st Brigade Machine Gun Company (from 14 March 1916, until 1 April 1918)
- 91st Trench Mortar Battery (joined May 1916)

Divisional Mounted Troops

- 1st Northumberland Hussars (On 12 April 1915, two of the three squadrons were transferred to other formations leaving the 7th Division with just A Squadron. A Squadron left on 13 May 1916)
- 7th Cyclist Company (until 11 May 1916)

Divisional Artillery

- XIV Brigade, Royal Horse Artillery (left 10 February 1917)
  - C Battery (until 19 October 1914)
  - F Battery
  - T Battery (from 21 December 1914)
  - XIV RHA Brigade Ammunition Column
  - D (Howitzer) Battery, Royal Field Artillery (RFA) (from 24 June 1915, until 20 December 1915)
  - 509th (Howitzer) Battery, RFA (from 7 October 1916, until 13 February 1917)
- XXII Brigade, RFA
  - 104th Battery
  - 105th Battery
  - 106th Battery
  - XXII Brigade Ammunition Column
  - 35th (Howitzer) Battery (from 17 May 1916)
- XXXV Brigade, RFA
  - 12th Battery
  - 25th Battery
  - 58th Battery
  - XXXV Brigade Ammunition Column
  - 31st (Howitzer) Battery (from 17 May 1916)
- XXXVII (Howitzer) Brigade, RFA (from 24 June 1915, broken up 17 May 1916)
  - 31st (Howitzer) Battery
  - 35th (Howitzer) Battery
  - XXVII (Howitzer) Brigade Ammunition Column
- III Heavy Brigade, Royal Garrison Artillery (until 4 March 1915)
  - 111 Heavy Battery
  - 112 Heavy Battery
  - Heavy Battery ammunition columns
- 7th divisional ammunition column (until 16 May 1916)
- No. 7 Pom-Pom Section (A.–A.) (from 25 September 1914, until 20 December 1914)
- 5th Mountain Battery (from 26 March 1915, until 20 April 1915)
- Medium Trench Mortars, Royal Field Artillery
  - X Battery (formed 25 February 1916)
  - Y Battery (formed March 1916)
  - Z Battery (formed March 1916, until 22 February 1918 when it was dispersed to X and Y batteries)
- Heavy Trench Mortars, Royal Field Artillery
  - V Battery (formed June 1916, disbanded 12 November 1917)

Divisional Engineers, Royal Engineers

- 54th Field Company
- 55th Field Company (until 1 September 1915)
- 95th Field Company (from 30 August 1915)
- 2nd Highland Field Company (from 17 January 1915, until 24 January 1916)
- 3rd Durham Field Company (from 30 January 1916; later renumbered 528th (3rd Durham) Field Company, and then 528th Field Company)
- 7th Divisional Signal Company

Pioneers

- 24th (Service) Battalion, Manchester Regiment (from 22 May 1916)

Divisional Machine Guns

- 220th Machine Gun Company (from 25 March 1917)
- No. 7 Battery, Machine Gun Corps (formed on 1 April 1918 by merger of brigade and the 220th Machine Gun Companies)

Divisional Medical Services, Royal Army Medical Corps

- 21st Field Ambulance
- 22nd Field Ambulance
- 23rd Field Ambulance

Divisional Veterinary Services, Army Veterinary Corps

- 12th Mobile Veterinary Section (from 16 September 1914, although did not move to France until 7 October 1914)

Divisional Services

- 7th Divisional Train, Army Service Corps
  - 39th Company
  - 40th Company
  - 42nd Company
  - 86th Company
- 12th Divisional Employment Company, Labour Corps (from 21 May 1917, renumbered 210th in June 1917)

=== Arab Revolt ===
7th Division (1938–1939)

18th Infantry Brigade

- 2nd Battalion, King's Own Royal Regiment (Lancaster)
- 2nd Battalion, West Yorkshire Regiment
- 1st Battalion, Worcestershire Regiment
- 2nd Battalion, Black Watch

19th Infantry Brigade

- 1st Battalion, Buffs (Royal East Kent Regiment)
- 1st Battalion, Royal Northumberland Fusiliers
- 1st Battalion, Bedfordshire and Hertfordshire Regiment
- 2nd Battalion, Highland Light Infantry

Divisional troops

- 3rd Battalion, Coldstream Guards
- Royal Scots Greys
- Royal Engineers
  - 54th Field Company
  - 56th Field Company
- Royal Army Service Corps
  - 14th Company
  - 58th Company
  - 67th Company
  - 68th Company

== See also ==
- List of British divisions in the First World War
- List of British divisions in World War II
- Structure of the British Army in 1939
- W. N. Hodgson, poet who served with the division and was killed during the Battle of the Somme

== Notes ==
Footnotes

Citations

== External sources ==
- The British Army in the Great War: The Long, Long Trail Archived 15 October 2015 at the Wayback Machine
- BritishMilitaryHistory, Palestine & Trans-Jordan 1930 - 1948
- Hughes, Richard M. (2014). Tommy Capper's "Immortals": How effective was the 7th Division at the 1st Battle of Ypres? (Masters thesis). Birmingham: University of Birmingham.
