= John de Bernewitz =

German military officer and mercenary

Major-General John de Bernewitz KCH
- Johann Heinrich Karl von Bernewitz
- Born: 27 December 1760; Dresden, Saxony
- Died: 12 December 1821 (aged 60); Brunswick
- Military career
- Allegiance: Duchy of Brunswick-Lüneburg; United Kingdom
- Branch: Brunswick Army; British Army
- Service years: 1775–1821 (Brunswick); 1811–1821 (Britain)
- Rank: Lieutenant-General (Brunswick); Major-General (Britain)
- Commands: Black Brunswickers; Brunswick Oels Infantry; Brigade, 7th Division; 7th Division; Commandant of Brunswick
- Conflicts: American Revolutionary War; Battles of Saratoga (POW); Napoleonic Wars; Battle of Jena (POW); Battle of Halberstadt; Battle of Ölper; Peninsular War; Battle of Salamanca; Siege of Burgos
- Awards: Army Gold Medal; Knight Commander of the Royal Guelphic Order

Major-General Johann Heinrich Karl von Bernewitz (27 December 1760 – 13 December 1821), styled John de Bernewitz when in British service, was a British Army officer who served as General Officer Commanding the 7th Division during the Peninsular War.

== Early life ==
John de Bernewitz was born Johan Heirich Karl von Bernewitz in Dresden, Saxony, on 27 December 1760. He was the first child born to Karl and Elisabeth von Bernewitz. The couple would go on to have six more children.

== Military career ==
De Bernewitz was commissioned into the Army of the Electorate of Brunswick-Lüneburg in 1775. He refused to join the Army of the Kingdom of Westphalia when Brunswick-Lüneburg was annexed by Westphalia in 1807. He then commanded the forces of Brunswick-Lüneburg during the rebellion by Frederick William, Duke of Brunswick-Wolfenbüttel in 1809. He served under British command during the Peninsular War and commanded a British brigade at the Battle of Salamanca on 22 July 1812. He also briefly served as General Officer Commanding the 7th Division in Spain from 23 September 1812 to 25 October 1812.
