= 22nd Brigade Royal Field Artillery =

British brigade in the First World War

XXII Brigade, Royal Field Artillery was a brigade (Note: The basic organic unit of the Royal Artillery was, and is, the Battery. When grouped together they formed brigades, in the same way that infantry battalions or cavalry regiments were grouped together in brigades. At the outbreak of World War I, a field artillery brigade of headquarters (4 officers, 37 other ranks), three batteries (5 and 193 each), and a brigade ammunition column (4 and 154) had a total strength just under 800 so was broadly comparable to an infantry battalion (just over 1,000) or a cavalry regiment (about 550). Like an infantry battalion, an artillery brigade was usually commanded by a Lieutenant-Colonel. Artillery brigades were redesignated as regiments in 1938.) of the Royal Field Artillery which served in the First World War.

It was composed of the 104th, 105th, and 106th Batteries, and on mobilisation in August 1914, it was stationed in South Africa. It returned to the United Kingdom and was attached to the 7th Infantry Division in October. It saw service with the 7th Division throughout the war.

35th (Howitzer) Battery joined the Brigade in July 1916.
