= 35th Brigade Royal Field Artillery =

XXXV Brigade, Royal Field Artillery was a brigade (Note: The basic organic unit of the Royal Artillery was, and is, the Battery. When grouped together they formed brigades, in the same way that infantry battalions or cavalry regiments were grouped together in brigades. At the outbreak of World War I, a field artillery brigade of headquarters (4 officers, 37 other ranks), three batteries (5 and 193 each), and a brigade ammunition column (4 and 154) had a total strength just under 800 so was broadly comparable to an infantry battalion (just over 1,000) or a cavalry regiment (about 550). Like an infantry battalion, an artillery brigade was usually commanded by a Lieutenant-Colonel. Artillery brigades were redesignated as regiments in 1938.) of the Royal Field Artillery which served in the First World War.

It was stationed in Eastern Command in the United Kingdom on mobilisation in August 1914, and was attached to 7th Division and sent to the Continent in September. It saw service with the division on the Western Front throughout the war.

It was originally formed with 12th, 25th and 58th Batteries, with 31st (Howitzer) Battery joining in May 1916.
