= Urroz, Navarre =

Town and municipality in Navarre, Spain

Coordinates: 42°47′N 1°27′W

Urroz
- Urroz-Villa
- Flag Coat of arms

- Map of Navarre

Urroz (official name: Urroz-Villa; basque: Urrotz) is a town and municipality located in the province and autonomous community of Navarre, northern Spain. The town has a small cemetery, and a "pelota" court, a church, and two or three small bars around a little plaza.

Urroz was very important due to its character as crossroads where the roads from north to south are the one from Erro to Campanas and from east to east the one from Pamplona to Aoiz and Lumbier. It was an important for market for many people around the area. In addition, a cattle fair was held annually every November 13-14 (Saint Martin's Day) .

The town has a square in its center. It was initially assigned to the non-Basque-speaking zone by the Foral Law 18/1986.

In June 2017 the Navarre Parliament approved the passage of Urroz-Villa to the Mixed Zone of Navarra by means of the Foral Law 9 / 2017.2
