= Darwan Singh Negi =

Indian recipient of the Victoria Cross

Darwan Singh Negi VC
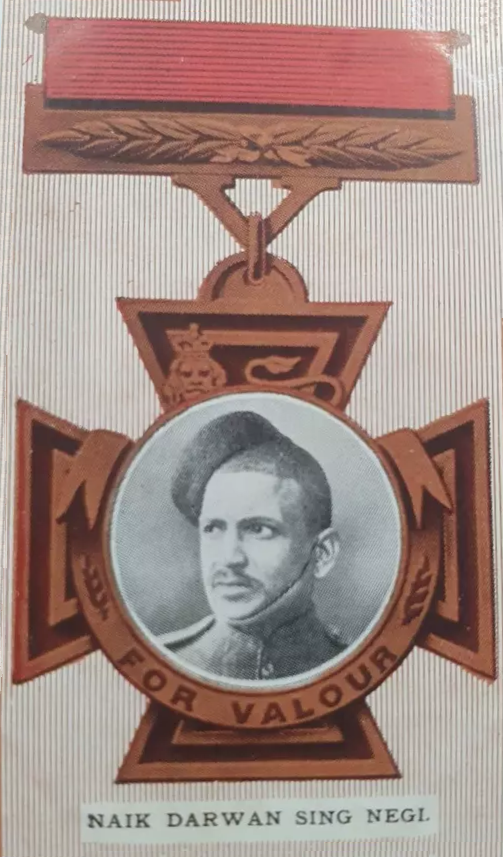
- Negi depicted on a cigarette card
- Born: 4 March 1883; Kafarteer, Garhwal District, North-Western Provinces, British Raj (present-day Chamoli district, Uttarakhand, India)
- Died: 24 June 1950 (aged 67); Kafarteer, Chamoli district, Uttar Pradesh, India
- Military career
- Allegiance: British India
- Branch: British Indian Army
- Rank: Subedar
- Units: 39th Garhwal Rifles
- Conflicts: World War I
- Awards: Victoria Cross

The injured Negi carried into the Royal Pavilion, Brighton, used as a military hospital (Illustrated War News, 23 December 1914)

Darwan Singh Negi VC (4 March 1883 – 24 June 1950) was one of the first Indian soldiers to be awarded the Victoria Cross (VC), the highest and most prestigious award for gallantry in the face of the enemy that can be awarded to British and Commonwealth forces.

== Early life ==
Negi was born to a farming family in Kafarteer village in the Garhwal District of the North-Western Provinces in India. In 1902, at the age of 19, he joined the 39th Garhwal Rifles, Indian Army.

== World War I ==
When the First World War broke out in 1914, the regiment travelled to France as part of the 7th (Meerut) Division of the Indian Corps. Negi was a 31 year old naik (equivalent to corporal) in the 1st Battalion, 39th Garhwal Rifles, British Indian Army during the First World War when he performed the deed during the Defence of Festubert for which he was awarded the VC.

== Victoria Cross ==
The citation of the VC reads:

His Majesty the KING-EMPEROR has been graciously pleased to approve of the grant of the Victoria Cross to the undermentioned soldier of the Indian Army for conspicuous bravery whilst serving with the Indian Army Corps, British Expeditionary Force: —

1909, Naik Darwan Singh [sic] Negi, 1st Battalion, 39th Garhwal Rifles.

For great gallantry on the night of the 23rd–24th November, near Festubert, France, when the regiment was engaged in retaking and clearing the enemy out of our trenches, and, although wounded in two places in the head, and also in the arm, being one of the first to push round each successive traverse, in the face of severe fire from bombs and rifles at the closest range.

— London Gazette, 7 December 1914.

He was awarded the medal on the same day as Khudadad Khan's VC; but Khan's VC action was of earlier date, so that he is regarded as the first Indian recipient.

Negi returned to India in January 1915 and undertook recruiting duty. After the First World War he served in Iraq, He retired in May 1926 with the rank of subedar, equivalent to a British captain. In the Second World War he again acted as a recruiting officer within India. He died on 24 June 1950 and was cremated in his home village of Kafarteer in the Garhwal division, India.

Negi's son Balbir served in the Garhwal Rifles of the Indian Army; and achieved the rank of colonel and Balbir's son is still serving as a Brigadier in the Indian Army. The Victoria Cross is held by the family. The regimental museum of the Garhwal Rifles in Lansdowne, Uttarakhand is named the Darwan Singh Museum in his honour.

== Awards and decorations ==

Victoria Cross	1914 Star (5th AUG.–22nd NOV. 1914)	British War Medal	Victory Medal
India General Service Medal (Malabar 1921–22)	General Service Medal (Kurdistan) (Iraq)	King George V Silver Jubilee Medal	King George VI Coronation Medal

== See also ==
- Gabar Singh Negi, another World War I Victoria Cross recipient from Uttarakhand
