= Gabar Singh Negi =

Indian Victoria Cross recipient (1895–1915)

Gabar Singh Negi VC
- Born: 21 April 1895; Manjaur, Tehri Garhwal State, British India (Present-day Tehri Garhwal district, Uttarakhand, India)
- Died: 10 March 1915 (aged 19) †; Neuve Chapelle, France
- Military career
- Allegiance: British India
- Branch: British Indian Army
- Service years: 1913–1915
- Rank: Rifleman
- Unit: 39th Garhwal Rifles
- Conflicts: First World War; Battle of Neuve Chapelle †
- Awards: Victoria Cross

Gabar Singh Negi VC (21 April 1895 – 10 March 1915) was a soldier in the British Indian Army during the First World War and a recipient of the Victoria Cross, the highest and most prestigious award for gallantry in the face of the enemy that can be awarded to British and Commonwealth forces.

== Early life ==
Gabar Singh Negi, was born on 21 April 1895 at Manjaur village near Chamba, Tehri Garhwal State (present-day Tehri Garhwal district, Uttarakhand). The area is in the Himalayas and was part of the original Garhwal Kingdom, Uttarakhand. He joined the 2nd Battalion of the Garhwal Rifles, a regiment of the British Indian Army, in October 1913; the personnel of the regiment were mainly from the Garhwali people of Uttarakhand

== First World War ==
On the outbreak of the First World War, the 39th Garhwal Rifles was among the regiments selected for the Indian Expeditionary Force A, destined for the Western Front in France. By October 1914, the regiment, as part of the 7th (Meerut) Division, was in the frontlines during the First Battle of Ypres and later in the Pas-de-Calais sector where it would remain until going into reserve at the end of that year.

In March 1915, the 7th Division was selected to be involved in the Battle of Neuve Chapelle, which called for an assault on the German lines at Neuve Chapelle. The 7th Division was to help force a gap for the Cavalry Corps to exploit. On 10 March 1915, during the battle, Negi's 2nd Battalion was attacking to the southwest of Neuve Chappelle; an artillery barrage that preceded the attack was not effective and the German trenches were well defended. Parties with bombs had to clear the trenches; one such party included Negi. When the commander of his party was killed, he took over, leading from the front as the party took control of the German trenches. He was later killed. His actions on 10 March led to him being posthumously awarded the Victoria Cross (VC). The VC, instituted in 1856, was the highest award for valour that could be bestowed on a soldier of the British Empire. The citation for his VC read as follows:

For most conspicuous bravery on 10th March, 1915, at Neuve Chapelle. During our attack on the German position he was one of a bayonet party with bombs who entered their main trench, and was the first man to go round each traverse, driving back the enemy until they were eventually forced to surrender. He was killed during this engagement.

— London Gazette, 28 April 1915

Negi has no known grave; his name is recorded on the Neuve-Chapelle Memorial, as Gabar Sing [sic] Negi. His name was one of those included on the dome of the Memorial Gates in London, unveiled in 2002.

== Victoria Cross ==
Negi's VC was sent to the India Office to be forwarded to his next of kin, Satoori Devi, his wife. The VC was acquired by his regiment, which arranged for a replica to be sent to Devi. A letter of condolences from Queen Mary was also sent to Devi. The medal was a source of pride for Negi's widow, who would wear it until her death in 1981.

== Legacy ==
Descendants of Negi have organised the Gabar Singh Negi Fair annually at Chamba in his memory, held every 20 or 21 April since 1925, depending on the Hindu calendar. His regiment, the Garhwal Rifles, have maintained a presence since 1971. A recruitment rally, stalls and army bands provide entertainment and many villagers, particularly the youths, attend the fair because of the drawcard of the recruitment rally.

== Awards and decorations ==

Victoria Cross	1914–15 Star	British War Medal	Victory Medal

== See also ==
- Darwan Singh Negi, another World War I Victoria Cross recipient from Uttarakhand

== Bibliography ==
- Ashcroft, Michael (2007) [2006]. Victoria Cross Heroes. London, United Kingdom: Headline Review. ISBN 978-0-7553-1633-5.
- Batchelor, Peter; Matson, Christopher (2011). The Western Front 1915. VCs of the First World War. Stroud, Gloucestershire: The History Press. ISBN 978-0-7524-6057-4.
- Buzzell, Nora, ed. (1997). The Register of the Victoria Cross. Cheltenham, Gloucestershire: This England Alma House. ISBN 0-906324-27-0.
- Morton-Jack, George (2018). The Indian Empire at War: From Jihad to Victory, the Untold Story of the Indian Army in the First World War. London: Little, Brown. ISBN 978-1-4087-0769-2.
