= Defence of Festubert =

First World War engagement on Western Front

- Part of Winter operations 1914–1915, Western Front, First World War
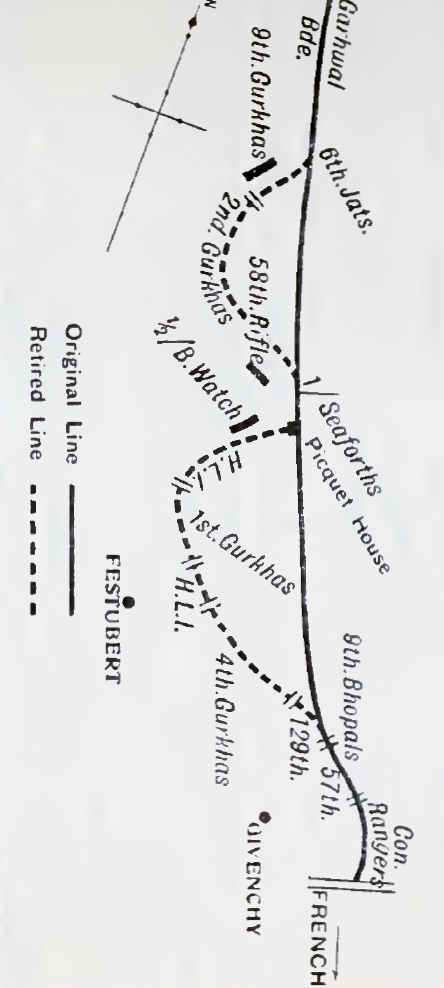
- Defence of Festubert 23–24 November 1914
Date	23–24 November 1914
Location	Festubert 50°32′39″N 02°44′15″E

Belligerents
German Empire	United Kingdom: India

Commanders and leaders
	Charles Anderson; Henry Keary; Claud Jacob

Units involved
Infantry Regiment 112	7th (Meerut) Division
- Festubert, commune in the Pas-de-Calais department and Nord-Pas-de-Calais region of France

The Defence of Festubert (23–24 November 1914) was an engagement on the Western Front early in the First World War when Indian and British battalions of the 7th (Meerut) Division of the Indian Army defended the village of Festubert against a German attack. It was one of the first actions in the war in which an operation was conducted against a prepared defensive position. The British and Indian regiments that took part were awarded the battle honour Festubert 1914.

== Battle ==
=== 23–24 November ===
The fighting around Ypres subsided in mutual exhaustion by 22 November and for about three weeks bad weather also inhibited operations apart from artillery-fire, bombing and sniping. At the end of the month the British made several night raids and on 23 November, the German Infantry Regiment 112 captured 800 yd (730 m) of trench east of Festubert in the Indian Corps area. The Indians counter-attacked through the night and recovered the trenches. The Defence of Festubert was one of the first attacks on an organised trench system. Most notably a night attack also occurred, involving mainly the 129th Duke of Connaught's Own Baluchis and the Mazhabi Sikhs of the 34th Royal Sikh Pioneers Regiment and the 1st Battalion Manchester Regiment. The battle was a costly British victory, the lost trench was recaptured but there were many casualties in the 129th Baluchis battalion and the 1st Manchesters.

== Order of battle ==
October 1914, 7th (Meerut) Division (Note: All data from Edmonds, Military Operations, 1914, Part II, 1925.)

GOC: Lieutenant-General Charles Alexander Anderson
GSO1: Colonel Claud Jacob

Dehra Dun Brigade GOC: Brigadier-General C. E. Johnson

- 1st Battalion Seaforth Highlanders
- 6th Jat Light Infantry
- 129th Baluchis
- 2/2nd King Edward’s Own Gurkha Rifles (The Sirmoor Regiment)
- 1/9th Gurkha Rifles

Garhwal Brigade GOC: Major-General Henry Keary

- 2nd Battalion Leicestershire Regiment
- 1/39th Garhwal Rifles
- 2/39th Garhwal Rifles
- 2/3rd Gurkha Rifles

Bareilly Brigade GOC: Major-General F. Macbean

- 2nd Battalion Black Watch
- 41st Dogras
- 58th Vaughan's Rifles (Frontier Force)
- 2/8th Gurkha Rifles

Divisional Mounted Troops

- 4th Cavalry

Divisional Artillery

- IV Brigade, Royal Field Artillery (replaced V Brigade, transferred to 3rd (Lahore) Division 17 October 1914)
  - 7th, 14th and 66th Batteries, IV Brigade Ammunition Column
- IX Brigade, RFA
  - 19th, 20th and 28th Batteries, IX Brigade Ammunition Column
- XIII Brigade, RFA (replaced XI Brigade, transferred to 3rd (Lahore) Division 17 October 1914)
  - 2nd, 8th and 44th Batteries, XIII Brigade Ammunition Column
- 110th Heavy Battery, Royal Garrison Artillery
  - Heavy Battery Ammunition Column
- Meerut Divisional Ammunition Column

Engineers

- 3rd and 4th Companies, 1st King George’s Own Sappers and Miners

Signals Service

- Meerut Signal Company

Divisional Pioneers

- 107th Pioneers

Supply and Transport:

- Meerut Divisional train

Medical Units:

- 19th and 20th British Field Ambulances
- 128th, 129th and 130th Indian Field Ambulances
