= Edward Barber (VC) =

Recipient of the Victoria Cross

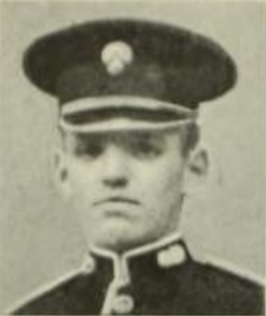
- Born: 10 June 1893; Tring, Hertfordshire
- Died: 12 March 1915 (aged 21); Neuve Chapelle, France
- Burial place: Remembered on the Le Touret Memorial
- Military career
- Allegiance: United Kingdom
- Branch: British Army
- Service years: -1915 †
- Rank: Private
- Service number: 15518
- Units: Grenadier Guards
- Conflicts: World War I: Western Front; Battle of Neuve Chapelle †
- Awards: Victoria Cross

Edward Barber VC (10 June 1893 – 12 March 1915) was an recipient of the Victoria Cross, the highest and most prestigious award for gallantry in the face of the enemy that can be awarded to and Commonwealth forces.

Barber was born on 10 June 1893 to William and Sarah Ann Barber, who resided at Miswell Lane, Tring, Hertfordshire.

He was 21 years old, and a Private in the 1st Battalion, Grenadier Guards, British Army during the First World War, and was awarded the Victoria Cross for his actions on 12 March 1915 at Neuve Chapelle, France, which led to his death.

== Citation ==
For most conspicuous bravery on 12th March, 1915, at Neuve Chapelle. He ran speedily in front of the grenade company to which he belonged, and threw bombs on the enemy with such effect that a very great number of them at once surrendered. When the grenade party reached Private Barber they found him quite alone and unsupported, with the enemy surrendering all about him.

— The London Gazette, 19 April 1915

His Victoria Cross is displayed at The Guards Regimental Headquarters (Grenadier Guards RHQ), Wellington Barracks, London.

== Bibliography ==
- Monuments to Courage (David Harvey, 1999)
- Batchelor, Peter; Matson, Christopher (2011). The Western Front 1915. VCs of the First World War. Stroud, Gloucestershire: The History Press. ISBN 978-0-7524-6057-4.
- Buzzell, Nora, ed. (1997). The Register of the Victoria Cross. Cheltenham: This England Alma House. ISBN 0-906324-27-0.
