= 3rd Gorkha Rifles =

Regiment of the Indian Army

3rd Gorkha Rifles (1950 onwards) 3rd Queen Alexandra's Own Gurkha Rifles (1908-1950)
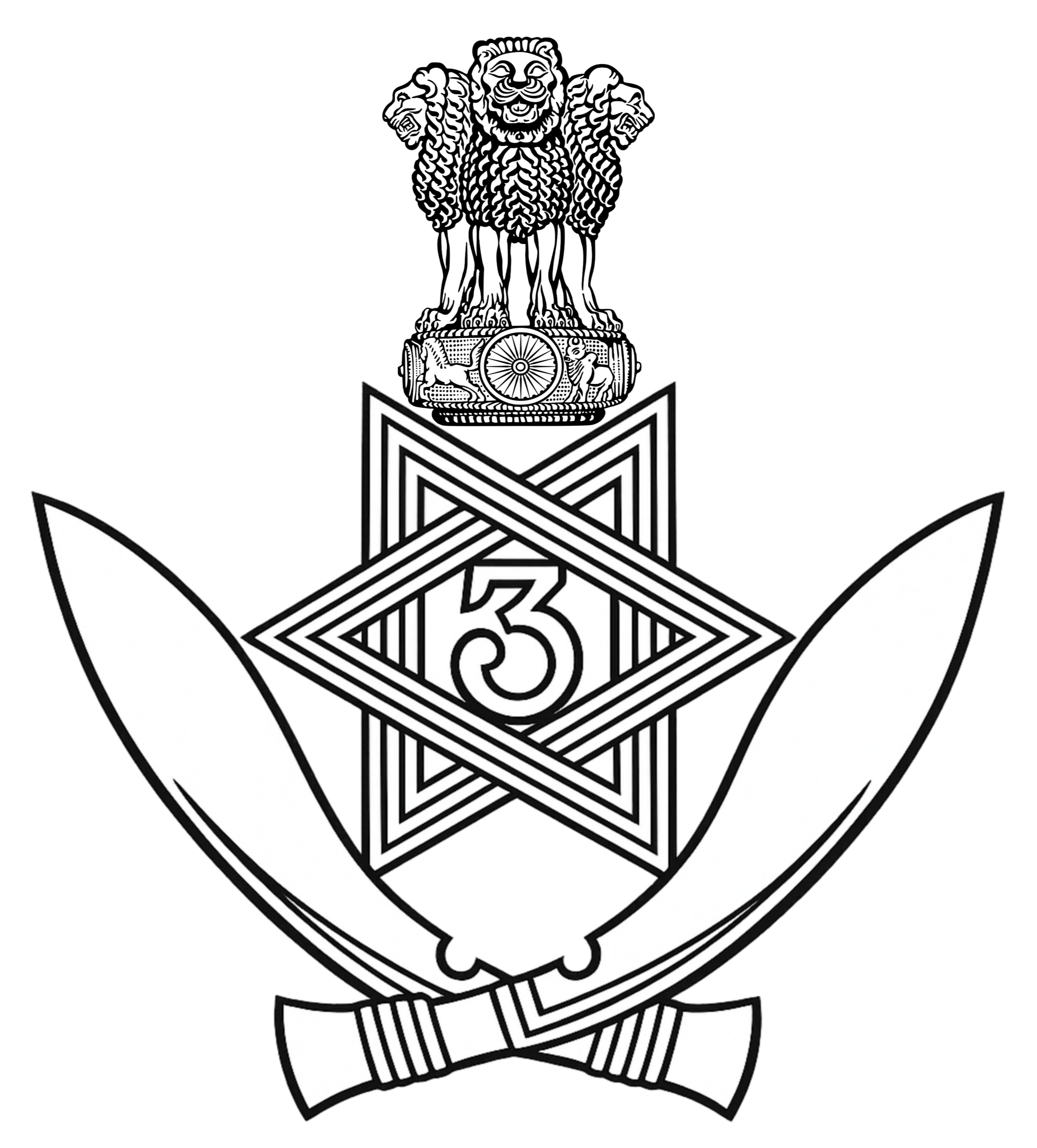
- Active: 1815 – Present
- Country: India
- Branch: Indian Army
- Type: Rifles
- Size: 5 Battalions
- Regimental Centre: Varanasi, Uttar Pradesh
- Mottos: Kayar Hunu Bhanda Marnu Ramro "Better to die than live like a coward"
- Colors: Green; faced black
- March: War Cry:Jai Maha Kali, Ayo Gorkhali (Hail Goddess Kali, The Gorkhas are here)
- Decorations: 2 Victoria Cross; 1 Ashoka Chakra; 1 Kirti Chakra; 5 Vir Chakras; 5 Shaurya Chakras; 1 Yudh Seva Medal; 19 Sena Medals; 1 Bar to Sena Medal; 4 Param Vishist Seva Medals; 5 Ati Vishist Seva Medals; 9 Vishist Seva Medals; 2 McGregor Medals; 26 Mentioned-in-Despatches; 46 COAS' Commendation Cards; 19 GOC-in-C's Commendation Cards
- Battle honours: Delhi 1857, Ahmad Khel, Afghanistan 1878–80; Burma 1885–87, Chitral; Tirah; Punjab Frontier; First World War; La Bassée 1914, Armentières 1914, Festubert 1914 '15, Givenchy 1914 Neuve Chapelle; Aubers; France and Flanders 1914–15 Egypt 1915–16; Gaza, El Mughar, Nebi Samwil; Jerusalem; Tell 'Asur, Megiddo; Sharon; Palestine 1917–18, Sharqat, Mesopotamia 1917–18, Afghanistan 1919; Second World War; Deir el Shein; North Africa 1940–43 Monte della Gorgace Il Castello; Monte Farneto; Monte Cavallo; Italy 1943–45; Sittang 1942; Kyaukse 1942; Imphal; Tuitum, Sakawng Shenam Pass, Bishenpur, Tengnoupal; Meiktila; Defence of Meiktila Rangoon Road, Pyawbwy; Pegu 1945; Burma 1942–45; Post 1947; Uri, Jammu and Kashmir 1947–48; Shingo River Valley; Jammu and Kashmir 1971

Commanders
- Colonel of the Regiment: Major General K Mahesh

Insignia
- Regimental Insignia: A pair of crossed khukris, with a star in-between and the numeral 3 within
- Tartan: Colqhuon (pipes and drums)

The 3rd Gorkha Rifles or Third Gorkha Rifles, abbreviated as 3 GR is an Indian Army infantry regiment. It was originally a Gurkha regiment of the British Indian Army formed in 1815. This regiment recruit mainly Magars and Gurung tribes. They were present at a number of actions and wars including the siege of Delhi in 1857 to the First and Second World Wars. After the Partition of India in 1947 the regiment was one of the six Gorkha regiments transferred to the Indian Army as part of the Tripartite Agreement signed between India, Nepal and Britain at the time of Indian independence. Prior to independence, the regiment was known as the 3rd Queen Alexandra's Own Gurkha Rifles. In 1950 the regiment's title was changed to 3rd Gorkha Rifles. Since 1947 the regiment has participated in a number of conflicts including the 1947 and 1971 wars against Pakistan.

== History ==
=== Formation to 1885 ===
The regiment was raised during the Gurkha War by Sir Robert Colquhoun on 24 April 1815 as the Kemaoon Battalion. It did not consist entirely of Gurkhas but of men from Kumaon and Garhwal. The regiment adopted the tartan of the Clan Colquhoun.

The regiment was primarily used to police the border with Nepal, doing so for many decades until the Indian Mutiny began in 1857. The battalion was actively involved in the efforts to quell it. During the siege of Delhi—which lasted from March to September 1857—the regiment, part of Colonel Colin Campbell's Third Column, took part in the storming of Kashmiri Gate and gained the Battle Honour "Delhi 1857". The mutiny was quelled by July 1858.

The regiment, having been brought into the line of the Bengal Army, was briefly titled the 18th Bengal Native Infantry in 1861 before the regiment gained its present numeral designation when it became the 3rd Gurkha (The Kumaon) Regiment. The regiment saw service in an expedition to Bhutan shortly after the name change.

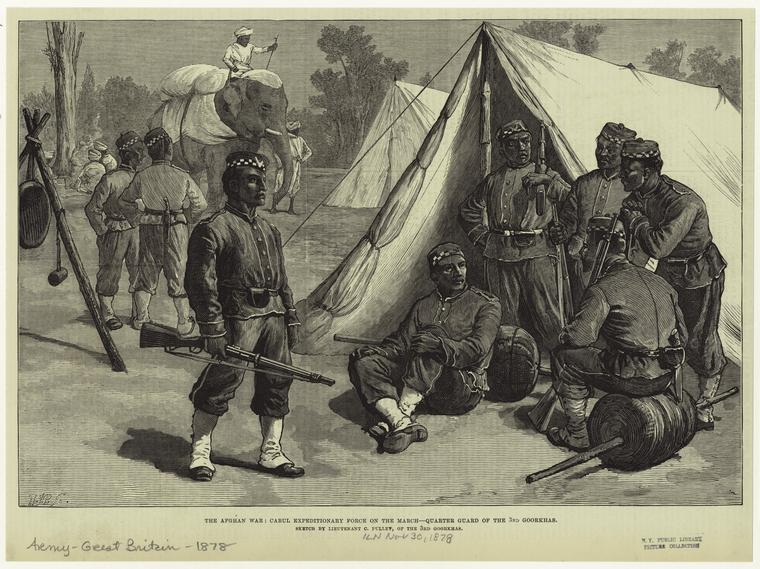
3rd Gurkha during the march to Kabul.

In 1878 the Second Afghan War began and the regiment, as part of the 2nd Infantry Brigade of the Kandahar Field Force, took part in the march to seize Kandahar. The field force successfully captured the city on 8 January 1879, having experienced great hardship on the march there. The following year the Kandahar Force began the march towards the Afghan capital Kabul to join Major-General Roberts force in an attempt to consolidate their situation in the country. During the journey, near Ghaziri, the force were attacked by a large force of Afghan tribesmen at Ahmad Khel on 19 April 1880. The fighting that ensued was intense and the field force's situation was in the balance until the Afghan forces were successfully repulsed when the 3rd Gurkha formed an infantry square.

=== 1885–1914 ===
The regiment took part in the Third Burmese War after it began in 1885 and operations concluded by the following year under First Brigade. In 1887 the 2nd Battalion was formed, consisting entirely of Garhwalis, but this was separated from the regiment in 1890 to form the 39th (The Garhwal) Regiment of Bengal Light Infantry. A new 2nd Battalion for the 3rd Gurkha was raised that same year and in 1891 the regiment was designated a rifle regiment, becoming the 3rd Gurkha (Rifle) Regiment.

The 3rd Gurkhas took part in numerous campaigns in the volatile North-West Frontier, including the 1st Battalion's participation in the storming of the Dargai Heights on 20 October 1897 during the Tirah Campaign. The battalion was part of the Tirah Field Force intended to put down a large tribal revolt by the Afridi and Orakzais, orchestrated by Afghanistan. The 3rd Gurkhas took part in the advance into the Tirah Region, meeting resistance from tribal forces before moving on to help relieve Fort Lockheart and Fort Gulistan. After this was done the force marched on Dargai where they intended to take the heights above Dargai, controlled by tribal forces.

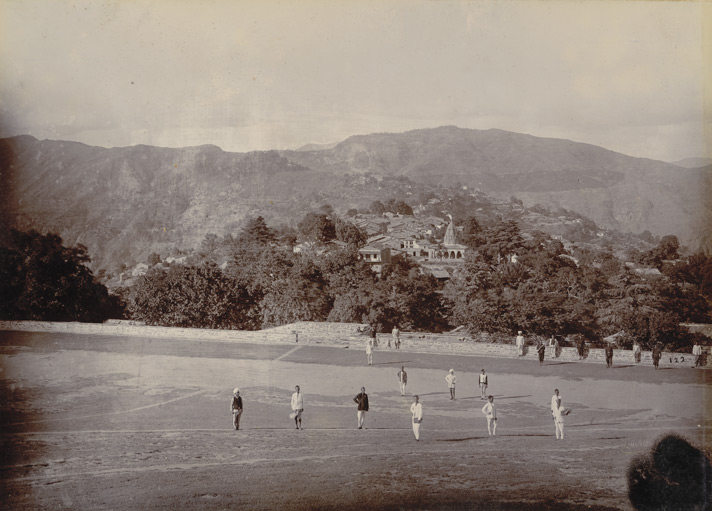
View of Almora, with soldiers of 3rd Gurkha Rifles, 1895.

The heights had originally been taken by the Tirah force on 18 October but they were ordered to withdraw, coming under attack as they did so and allowing the tribal force to return to the heights and strengthen their positions. The operation to retake the heights began with an artillery bombardment at 10:00 am on 20 October. The regiment took part in the initial assault, positioned at the forefront of the attack with the 2nd Gurkha Rifles and the 1st Dorsets. They advanced methodically, moving up the slopes until they charged towards the enemy but sustained heavy casualties and became pinned down. The battle raged on for hours until, after the tribal positions were subject to an artillery bombardment, a final charge was made by the 1st Gordons, followed by the Gurkhas and 3rd Sikhs. The tribal defenders wilted in the face of the charge and the heights were taken later that day.

In 1907 the title was changed to become the 3rd The Queen's Own Gurkha Rifles in honour of Alexandra of Denmark, queen consort of King Edward VII, and the following year the title became more specific when it became the 3rd Queen Alexandra's Own Gurkha Rifles.

=== First World War ===
In August 1914 the First World War began and the regiment's battalions actively participated on the Western Front and in the Middle East.

In 1916, a clerical error gave the regiment a 4th Battalion when 4/3rd, instead of 3/4th, was written on the order for the raising of a battalion for the 4th Gurkha Rifles. The following year a 3rd Battalion for the 3rd Gurkhas was formed.

==== Western Front ====
The 2nd Battalion, as part of the 20th (Garhwal) Brigade of the 7th (Meerut) Division, was sent to France a few months after the declaration of war in 1914.

The battalion's first large-scale action came at La Bassée that had commenced on 12 October as part of a period known as the "Race to the Sea". The battalion was involved in the defence of Festubert in November and Givenchy in December, during a bitter winter that the Gurkhas were no doubt unaccustomed to having spent the pre-war period on the sub-continent.

The battalion remained on the Western Front until late 1915. At the Battle of Neuve Chapelle (10–13 March) the Garhwal Brigade advanced successfully during the initial offensive and the 2nd Battalion took part in fierce fighting during the battle. In May it was involved in the battles of Festubert and Aubers. In September the battalion took part in the Battle of Loos which saw the regiment awarded its first Victoria Cross. The VC action took place on 25 September when Rifleman Kulbir Thapa of the 2nd Battalion performed with distinction near the village of Fauquissart, becoming the first Gurkha recipient of the award.

The Battle of Loos was the battalion's last action on the Western Front and it left the 7th Division with the rest of the Garhwal Brigade for Egypt in December 1915 after the brigade became an independent unit.

==== Middle East ====
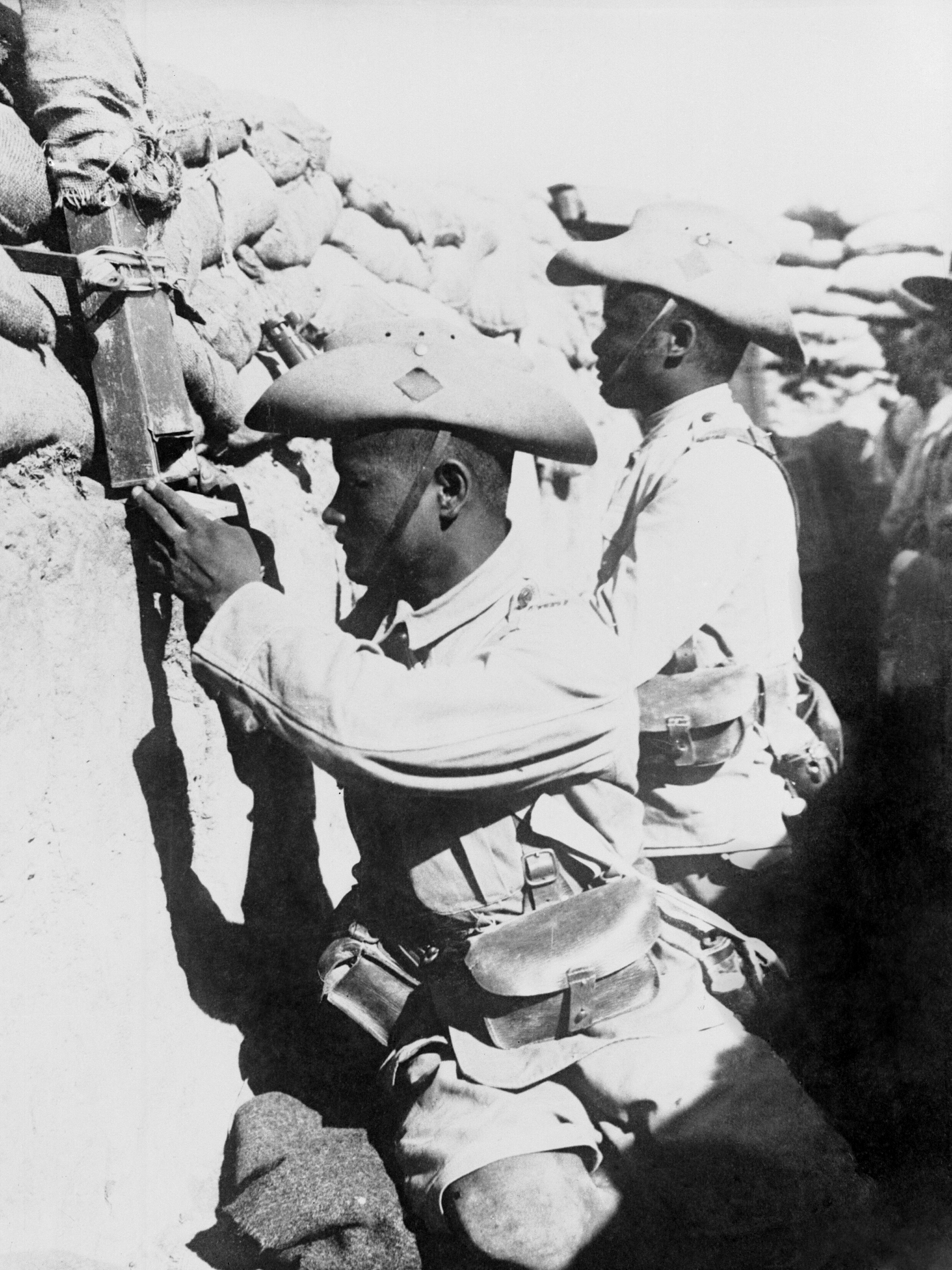
The Gurkha Rifles in front line trenches at the Battle of Mughar Ridge, Palestine, November 1917

After its arrival in Egypt the 2nd Battalion saw active service against the Ottoman Empire and later took part in the Palestine campaign, the second largest campaign by force totals during the First World War. It fought in the Autumn Offensive, seeing their first action during the Battles of Gaza. It was involved in many other actions during the campaign, including the Battle of Mughar Ridge in November 1917 and the capture of Jerusalem in December. On 19 September 1918, just a few months before the conclusion of the war, the Megiddo Offensive, began and the battalion was involved in the capture of Sharon. For its part in the campaign the 3rd Gurkhas gained seven Battle Honours and the Theatre Honour "Palestine 1917–18" after such honours were granted to units in the 1920s.

On 10 April 1918 at El Kefr in Egypt, Karanbahadur Rana of the 2nd Battalion became the regiment's second VC recipient after distinguishing himself in an encounter with Ottoman forces, and was the last VC recipient of the regiment.

Elsewhere the 1st Battalion, from 1917, took part in the Mesopotamian Campaign (now Iraq), gaining only a single Battle Honour in the process. It was achieved at the last battle of the campaign, at the Battle of Sharqat (28–30 October 1918).

=== Interwar period ===
The First World War concluded with the signing of the Armistice on 11 November 1918 but this gave the regiment no respite. It took part in the Third Afghan War in 1919 and spent much of their inter-war years in the North West Frontier and Burma. The post-war reductions saw the regiment reduced to its pre-war establishment. The 3rd Battalion was disbanded in 1920 and the mistakenly raised 4th Battalion followed in 1922.

=== Second World War ===
The regiment was actively involved in Second World War and, as had happened during the First World War, the regiment was expanded to meet its commitments. The 3rd Battalion was re-raised in 1940, followed by the 4th Battalion in 1941. During the conflict, the regiment fought in a number of theatres, including North Africa, Italy and Burma. During the North African campaign, the 2nd Battalion fought at Tobruk, where they were brought in as reinforcements at the height of the battle and suffered misfortune almost immediately, when they were partially overrun by the Germans, losing almost two hundred men as prisoners of war, although many of these managed to escape later.

=== Post Independence ===
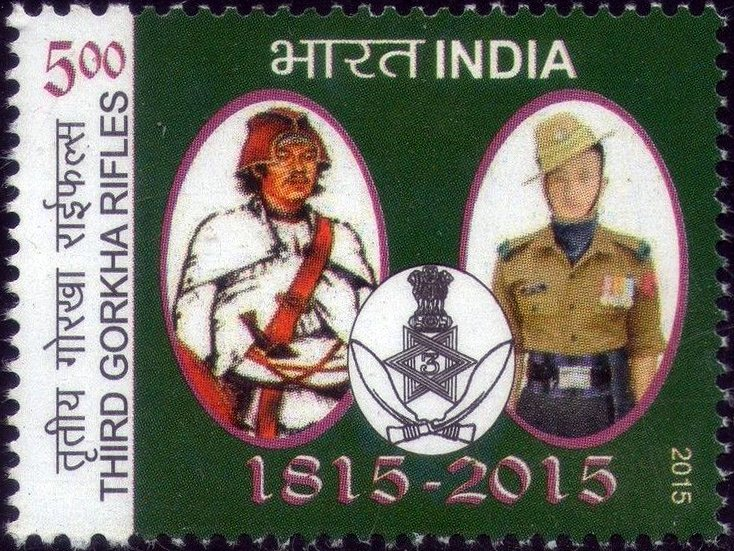
3rd Gorkha Rifles Bicentenary postal stamp issued in 2015

India gained its independence in 1947 and the regiment was one of six Gurkha regiments (out of 10) to be allocated to the Indian Army as part of the Tripartite Agreement between Britain, India and Nepal. The regiment retained its title until 1950 when India was proclaimed a Republic and the regiment became the 3rd Gorkha Rifles. It remains in existence and consists of five battalions.

The Regiment won the Battle Honour 'Pir Kanthi' in the Uri Sector in the war of 1948 and 'Shingo' in the Kargil Sector in war of 1971. 1/3 GR has the distinction of being the first battalion in the post-independence period to carry out amphibious operations during the 1971 Indo-Pak War. Colonel J.R. Chitnis, CO 1/3 GR, was honoured with the Ashoka Chakra posthumously—India's highest peacetime medal for valour—in Nagaland in 1956.

On 3 December 1997, a statue was unveiled in London in honour of the Gurkhas. A quote from Sir Ralph Turner, a former officer in the 3rd Gurkhas, was inscribed on the memorial: "Bravest of the brave, most generous of the generous, never had country more faithful friends than you."

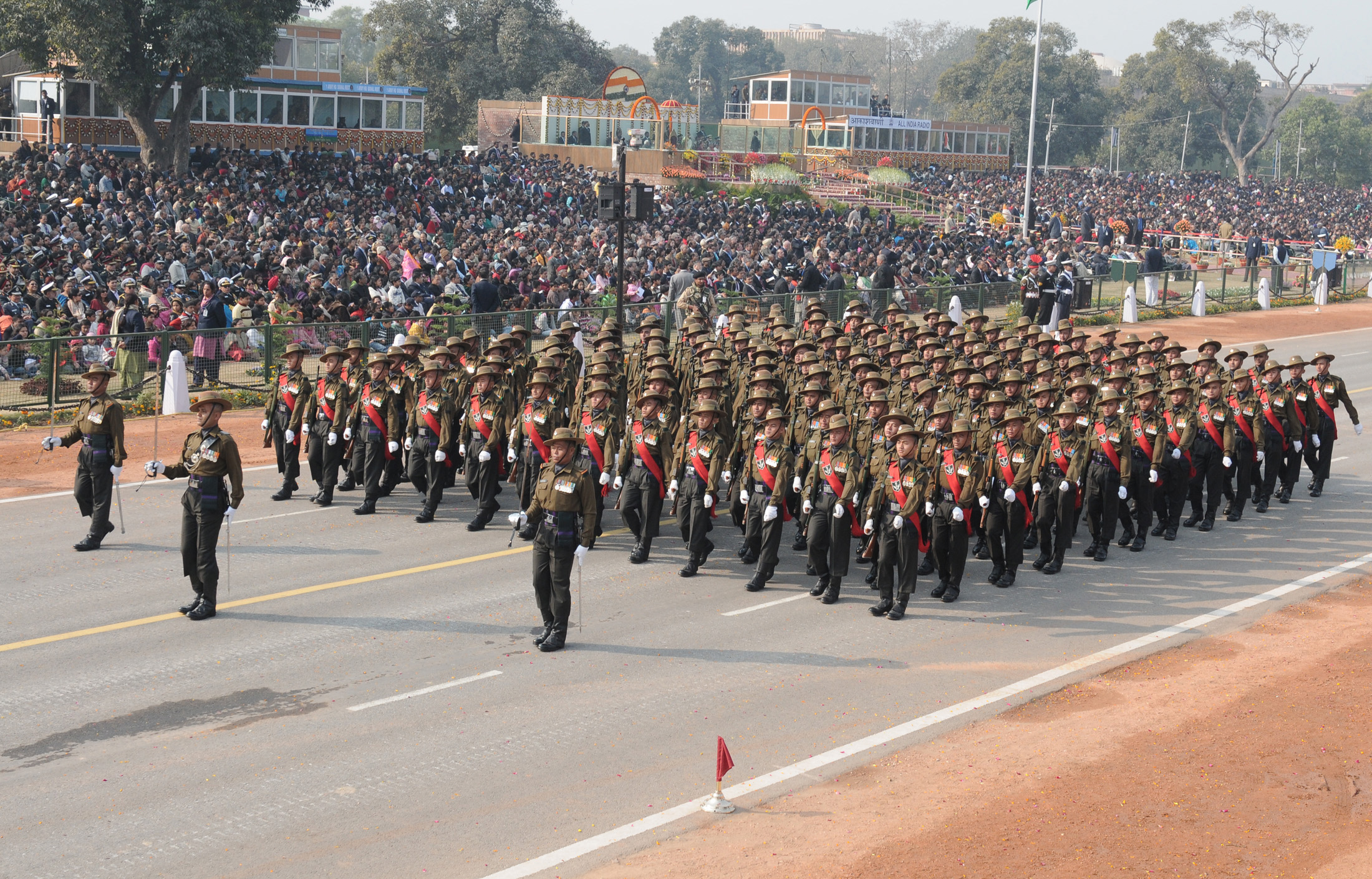
3 Gorkha Rifles marching contingent passes through the Rajpath during the 62nd Republic Day Parade-2011

== Uniforms ==
In its early years as the Kemaoon Battalion, the regiment wore green uniforms with white (after 1828 black) facings. As the 3rd Gurkhas from 1861, rifle green uniforms with black cuff facings were adopted to be worn with the round peakless Kilmarnock cap common to all Gurkha regiments. As was the practice with all Gurkha rifle regiments, black metal buttons and insignia were to remain features of the dress uniforms of the 3rd GR. Khaki drill was worn for active service and hot-weather dress from 1878 on. Shorts were adopted by the 3rd GR in 1900, at the same time as the wide brimmed "Kashmir" slouch hat came into general use. The latter had a green edged "pugri" (wide khaki band) as a regimental distinction. While the historic dark green ceased to be worn after World War I, except as part of officers' mess uniforms and a few other limited categories, the Kilmanock cap survived as a dress item until modern times.
