= Jacob Rivers =

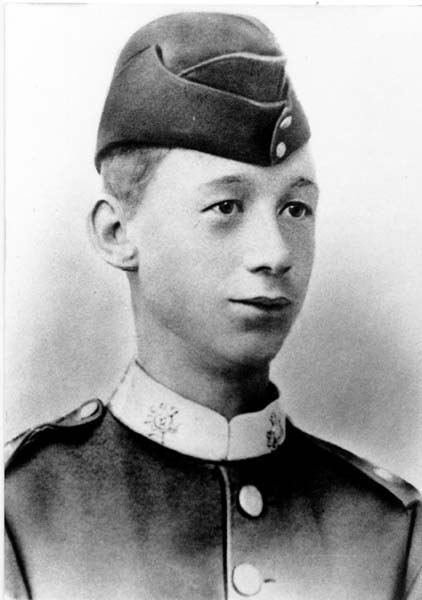
- Born: 17 November 1881; Derby, Derbyshire, England
- Died: 12 March 1915 (aged 33) †; Neuve Chapelle, France
- Military career
- Allegiance: United Kingdom
- Branch: British Army
- Service years: 1899–1907; 1914–1915
- Rank: Private
- Service number: 6016
- Units: Sherwood Foresters
- Conflicts: First World War †
- Awards: Victoria Cross

Private Jacob Rivers VC (17 November 1881 – 12 March 1915) was a British Army soldier and an English recipient of the Victoria Cross (VC), the highest and most prestigious award for gallantry in the face of the enemy that can be awarded to British and Commonwealth forces. He was posthumously awarded the VC during the First World War for his actions during the Battle of Neuve Chapelle in March 1915.

== Early life ==
Jacob Rivers' was born at Bridgegate in Derby, England, on 17 November 1881. Other than that he was one of seven children of Adeline Rivers, little is known of his formative years. He joined the British Army in June 1899, and was posted to the Royal Scots Fusiliers. A period of seven years service followed, mainly in British India and Burma. He was discharged in 1907 and was placed on the military reserve.

After service in the army, Rivers worked for the Midland Railway between/June 1911 and August 1914.

== First World War ==
At the start of the First World War, which began for Britain in August 1914, Rivers was employed by the Midland Railway Company in Derby, working as labourer on a ballast train. He volunteered for the British Army and was posted to the 1st Battalion of The Sherwood Foresters (The Nottinghamshire and Derbyshire Regiment). The regiment was serving on the Western Front by the end of the year as part of the 8th Division.

In early 1915, the division was assigned to an offensive designed to breach the German lines at Neuve Chapelle in France. For the start of the offensive, on 10 March 1915, Rivers' battalion was in reserve but was brought into action the following day when it had to advance towards the village of Pietre. The movement of the battalion was halted by machine-gun posts and they had to dig in. During a German counterattack the next day, the battalion was under considerable pressure on its right flank. Rivers cautiously approached the German position and threw several bombs on them, forcing the withdrawal of the garrison. Later in the day, he repeated the effort on another position but was killed. For his actions, he was awarded the Victoria Cross (VC). The VC, instituted in 1856, was the highest award for valour that could be bestowed on a soldier of the British Empire. The citation reads as follows:

For most conspicuous bravery at Neuve-Chapelle on 12th March, 1915, when he, on his own initiative, crept to within a few yards of a very large number of the enemy who were massed on the flank of an advanced company of his battalion, and hurled bombs on them. His action caused the enemy to retire, and so relieved the situation. Pte. Rivers performed a second act of great bravery on the same day, similar to the first mentioned, again causing the enemy to retire. He was killed on this occasion.

— London Gazette, 28 April 1915

He was buried in a battlefield grave which was later lost. He is commemorated on the Le Touret Memorial.

== The medal ==
King George V presented Rivers' VC to his mother on 29 November 1916, in a ceremony at Buckingham Palace. On his mother's death in 1937, his VC was donated to his regiment. The VC is displayed at the Sherwood Foresters Museum in Nottingham.

In 2010, The Nottingham Castle Victoria Cross Memorial, which lists Rivers among the 20 VC recipients from Nottinghamshire, was unveiled at Nottingham Castle. On 12 March 2017, the 102nd anniversary of his death, a plaque commemorating Rivers was unveiled at platform 1 of Derby railway station.
