= William Buckingham (VC) =

Recipient of the Victoria Cross

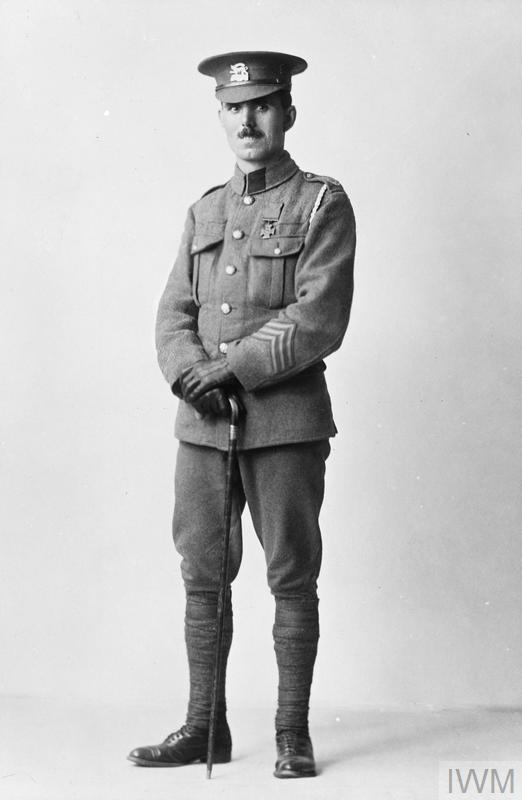
- Private William Buckingham
- Born: February 1886; Bedford, England
- Died: 5 September 1916 (aged 30); Thiepval, France
- Military career
- Allegiance: United Kingdom
- Branch: British Army
- Service years: 1901–1916 †
- Rank: Private
- Service number: 6276
- Units: Leicestershire Regiment
- Conflicts: First World War: Battle of Neuve Chapelle; Battle of the Somme †
- Awards: Victoria Cross

Private William Buckingham VC (February 1886 – 15 September 1916) was an English recipient of the Victoria Cross (VC), the highest and most prestigious award for gallantry in the face of the enemy that can be awarded to British and Commonwealth forces. He received the VC during the First World War, for his actions during the Battle of Neuve Chapelle in March 1915. He was killed the following year at Thiepval.

== Early life ==
The exact date of William Buckingham's birth is not known, but he was born in February 1886 in Bedford, England. He was the oldest child of William Henry Billington and his wife, Annie Billington. His father died in 1888, and his mother remarried in 1891, to Thomas Buckingham. A couple of years later, when William was six, he and his brother was placed in the Countesthorpe Cottage Homes, near Leicester, where he would spend most of his youth.

== Military career ==
Buckingham joined the British Army in November 1901, when he was nearly 16, and was posted to the 2nd Battalion of the Leicestershire Regiment. With the regiment, he served on Guernsey and in British India.

== First World War ==
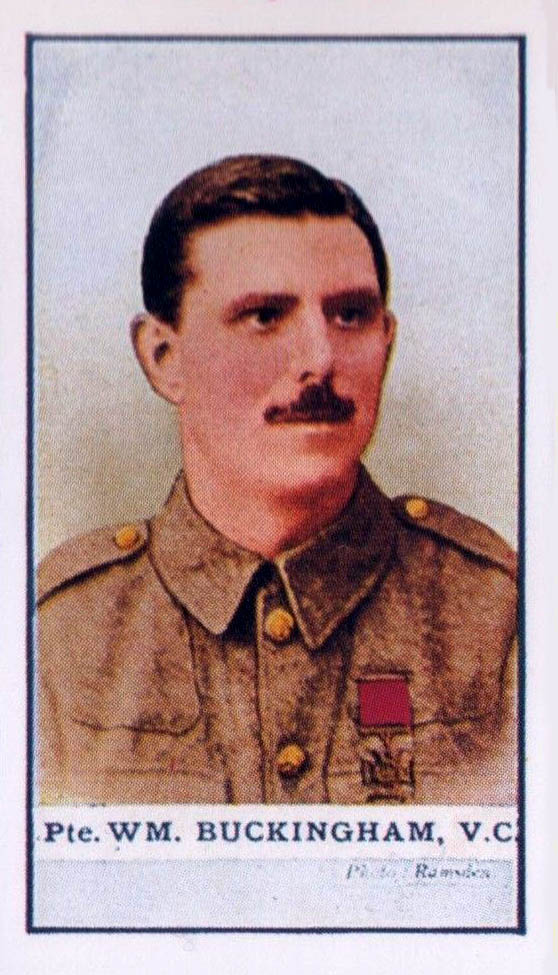
A newspaper drawing of Buckingham

On the outbreak of the First World War in the summer of 1914, Buckingham was still in India with the 2nd Battalion. It was attached to the 20th Indian Brigade, 7th (Meerut) Division, and sent to the Western Front with the Indian Corps. He fought at the Defence of Givenchy, with his name being forwarded to Lieutenant General James Willcocks, the commander of the Indian Corps, for special mention.

In March 1915, the Meerut Division was selected to be involved in the Battle of Neuve Chapelle, which called for an assault on the German lines at Neuve Chapelle. The Meerut Division was to help force a gap for the Cavalry Corps to exploit. His battalion was on the right of the division's sector and proceeded to capture a section of German trenches that had been overlooked for a preliminary artillery barrage. Over the next two days, until relieved, the battalion resisted German counterattacks and artillery. During this time, Buckingham carried out several sorties to recover men who had been wounded. For his actions, he was awarded the Victoria Cross (VC). The VC, instituted in 1856, was the highest award for valour that could be bestowed on a serviceman of the British Empire. The citation reads as follows:

For conspicuous acts of bravery and devotion to duty in rescuing and rendering aid to the wounded whilst exposed to heavy fire, especially at Neuve-Chapelle on 10th and 12th March 1915.

— London Gazette, 28 April 1915

Buckingham was wounded in the chest during the fighting, and was sent to England for recovery. He was unaware of the award of the VC until an acquaintance showed him a newspaper reporting it. King George V presented him with the VC on 4 June 1915, in a ceremony at Buckingham Palace. His caregivers from the Countesthorpe Cottage Homes were present for the investiture. It was later discovered that his mother was still alive, his stepfather having apparently abandoned the family many years previously. His hometown of Leicester took some pride in the award, gifting him £100 in war loan stock and a purse of gold.

Rather than immediately returning to his battalion, Buckingham was used in recruitment drives for the war effort. He remained in England until April 1916, at which time he was posted to the 1st Battalion of the Leicestershire Regiment. He was promoted to acting corporal for a time but requested a return to his previous rank of private. He was killed at Thiepval on 15 September 1916, during the later stages of the Battle of the Somme. He has no known grave and his name is recorded on the Thiepval Memorial to the Missing of the Somme.

== Medals ==
His medals, which in addition to the VC, included the 1914 Star, British War Medal, and the Victory Medal, were in the care of Countesthorpe Cottage Homes until 1958, at which time the facility was closed. They were then transferred to the care of the Child Welfare Department in Leicester. Since 1966, the medals have been displayed at the Royal Leicestershire Regiment Museum Collection in the Newarke Houses Museum, Leicester.

== See also ==
- Robert Gee VC, who also passed through the Countesthorpe Cottage Homes

== Bibliography ==
- Ashcroft, Michael (2007) [2006]. Victoria Cross Heroes. London: Headline Review. ISBN 978-0-7553-1633-5.
- Batchelor, Peter; Matson, Christopher (2011). The Western Front 1915. VCs of the First World War. Stroud, Gloucestershire: The History Press. ISBN 978-0-7524-6057-4.
- Buzzell, Nora, ed. (1997). The Register of the Victoria Cross. Cheltenham, Gloucestershire: This England Alma House. ISBN 0-906324-27-0.
