= William Anderson (VC) =

Recipient of the Victoria Cross

- William Anderson
- Born: 28 December 1882; Dallas, Moray, Scotland
- Died: 13 March 1915 (aged 32); Neuve-Chapelle, France
- Military career
- Allegiance: United Kingdom
- Branch: British Army
- Service years: 1905–1912; 1914–1915
- Rank: Corporal
- Units: Green Howards
- Conflicts: First World War: Western Front; Battle of Neuve Chapelle †
- Awards: Victoria Cross

William Anderson VC (28 December 1882 – 13 March 1915) was a recipient of the Victoria Cross, the highest and most prestigious award for gallantry in the face of the enemy that can be awarded to and Commonwealth forces. He was posthumously awarded the VC during the First World War for his actions during the Battle of Neuve Chapelle in March 1915.

== Early life ==
Anderson was born in Dallas, Moray in Scotland on 28 December 1882 to Alexander and Bella Anderson. The family later moved to Forres, where he was educated at Forres Academy. After completing his education, he moved to Glasgow and was employed as a car conductor with the Corporation Tramways for several years.

In 1905, Anderson enlisted in the British Army, joining the 2nd Battalion, Yorkshire Regiment, also known as the Green Howards, for a seven-year period of service; his brother James was already serving with the battalion. William would spend time in Egypt, South Africa, and British India, on the North West Frontier. After his period of service ended, Anderson returned to Glasgow and was employed in the Elder Hospital in Govan. By this stage, he was engaged and planned to emigrate to South Africa.

== First World War ==
Anderson was still living in England, having not yet completed his move to South Africa, when the First World War broke out. As he was a reservist, he was soon called up to the British Army. In November 1914, he rejoined the 2nd Battalion, Yorkshire Regiment, the battalion that he had previously served with, which was now on the Western Front in France as part of the 7th Division. By this stage, he was an acting corporal.

In March 1915, the 7th Division was involved in the Battle of Neuve Chapelle. It entered the fighting on 11 March, during which time Anderson was one of a group of men involved in a bombing raid. He was involved in another bombing raid the next day, when his company tried to retake ground lost to the Germans the previous day. It was for this action that he was awarded the Victoria Cross (VC). The VC, instituted in 1856, was the highest award for valour that could be bestowed on a soldier of the British Empire. The citation read as follows:

For most conspicuous bravery at Neuve-Chapelle on 12th March 1915, when he led three men with bombs against a large party of the enemy who had entered our trenches, and by his prompt and determined action saved, what might otherwise have become, a serious situation. Cpl. Anderson first threw his own bombs, then those in possession of his three men (who had been wounded) amongst the Germans, after which he opened rapid rifle fire upon them with great effect, notwithstanding that he was at the time quite alone.

His VC award was gazetted in May 1915, but by then Anderson was dead, having been killed in action on 13 March 1915. His remains were never found, and he is commemorated on the Le Touret Memorial.

== Medal ==
As Anderson's parents were deceased, his brother Alexander was presented with Anderson's VC by Lieutenant General Francis Davies, the former commander of the 7th Division, in a ceremony at Edinburgh Castle on 19 May 1920. Several years later, the VC was donated to the Green Howards Regimental Museum in Richmond, Yorkshire. He is remembered on the Forres War Memorial and on 15 March 2015, a commemorative tablet in Anderson's honour was laid at the war memorial at Dallas, where he was born.

== Bibliography ==
- Ashcroft, Michael (2007) [2006]. Victoria Cross Heroes. London, United Kingdom: Headline Review. ISBN 978-0-7553-1633-5.
- Batchelor, Peter; Matson, Christopher (2011). The Western Front 1915. VCs of the First World War. Stroud, Gloucestershire: The History Press. ISBN 978-0-7524-6057-4.
- Buzzell, Nora, ed. (1997). The Register of the Victoria Cross. Cheltenham, Gloucestershire: This England Alma House. ISBN 0-906324-27-0.
