= Henry Keary =

British Indian Army general (1857–1937)

Lieutenant-General Sir Henry Keary KCB KCIE DSO
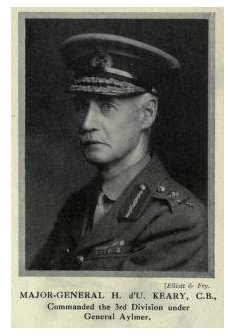
- Born: Henry D'Urban Keary; 28 April 1857
- Died: 12 August 1937 (aged 80)

Lieutenant-General Sir Henry D'Urban Keary KCB KCIE DSO (28 April 1857 – 12 August 1937) was a British Indian Army officer, who served in a number of colonial conflicts before commanding an Indian division on the Western Front during the First World War.

== Early life ==
Henry D'Urban Keary was born on 28 April 1857, the fourth son of William Keary, the manager and agent of the Holkham Hall estate in Norfolk, and his wife Anna (née Anna D'Urban Rodwell). He was educated at Marlborough College before attending the Royal Military College, Sandhurst; on passing out from Sandhurst in 1876, he was commissioned into the 2nd Battalion of the Suffolk Regiment as a second lieutenant. Later the same year, he was transferred to the Staff Corps and posted to India, where he took up a commission in the 1st Madras Native Infantry.

== Indian service ==
Keary was promoted to lieutenant shortly after his arrival, in 1877, and served with his regiment in the Second Anglo-Afghan War in 1879-8 and the Third Anglo-Burmese War in 1885. From 1887 to 1892, with a promotion to captain, he raised and then commanded a battalion of military police in Burma, as part of the operations to secure British control in the newly annexed country. During this time, he was involved in the operations against Wuntho in 1891, for which he was awarded the Distinguished Service Order as well as being mentioned in despatches.

In 1892, he was given a brevet promotion to major and appointed to command the 31st Madras Light Infantry, which was involved in suppressing a rebellion in the northern Chin Hills in 1892–93. It later served in China (renamed the 31st Burma Light Infantry) as part of the Western relief force during the Boxer Rebellion, where Keary was again mentioned in despatches.

His brevet promotion was confirmed in 1897, and he was subsequently promoted to lieutenant-colonel in 1903 and brevet colonel in September 1906. He relinquished command of the regiment (now named as the 91st Punjabis) in 1909, when he was appointed to command the 2nd Infantry Brigade of the 9th (Secunderabad) Division; in 1910, after being promoted to temporary brigadier general, he transferred to the Garhwal Brigade of 7th (Meerut) Division in November 1911. From February 1907 to 1912 he served as a personal aide-de-camp to the King, and was made a colonel on the staff and a temporary brigadier general while employed in this role.

He was awarded the Companion of the Order of the Bath in the 1911 Birthday Honours in June 1911. In December he was promoted to major general.

== First World War ==
Keary was in command of the Garhwal Brigade at the outbreak of the First World War in August 1914, when it was mobilised for service in France as part of the Meerut Division. The brigade had one British battalion (the 2nd Leicestershire Regiment) and three Indian (the 1st and 2nd battalions of the 39th Garhwal Rifles, and the 2nd/3rd Gurkha Rifles). It sailed for France in September, and was disembarking in Marseilles by 11 October, moving to the Western Front by the end of the month.

He commanded the brigade during its first months on the Western Front with "good initiative and tactical judgment", leading to his promotion to take command of the 3rd (Lahore) Division in January 1915. At the Second Battle of Ypres that year he commanded the division in a series of unsuccessful counter-attacks.

The division was withdrawn from the front line in November 1915, and after resting in France arrived in the Mesopotamian theatre in April 1916.

Keary was promoted to lieutenant-general in 1917, and given command of the 7th Meerut Divisional Area in India in October 1917. He was later given command of the Burma Division in August 1918.

== Later career ==
During the Anglo-Kuki War, in January 1919, there was a sudden uprising by the Kukis in Assam and Burma. Under the leadership of Lieutenant-General Sir Henry D'Urban Keary, sanctions were implemented, such as a ban on cultivation. The Kuki leaders were apprehended, and the local rebels were disarmed.

He retired from the Indian Army on 21 December 1919.

Keary died at the age of 80 on 12 August 1937, at his home in Surbiton Court, Surbiton, Surrey, leaving an estate of £191. His wife survived him, dying in 1940.

He was awarded Order of the White Eagle.
