= Le Touret Memorial =

- Commonwealth War Graves Commission
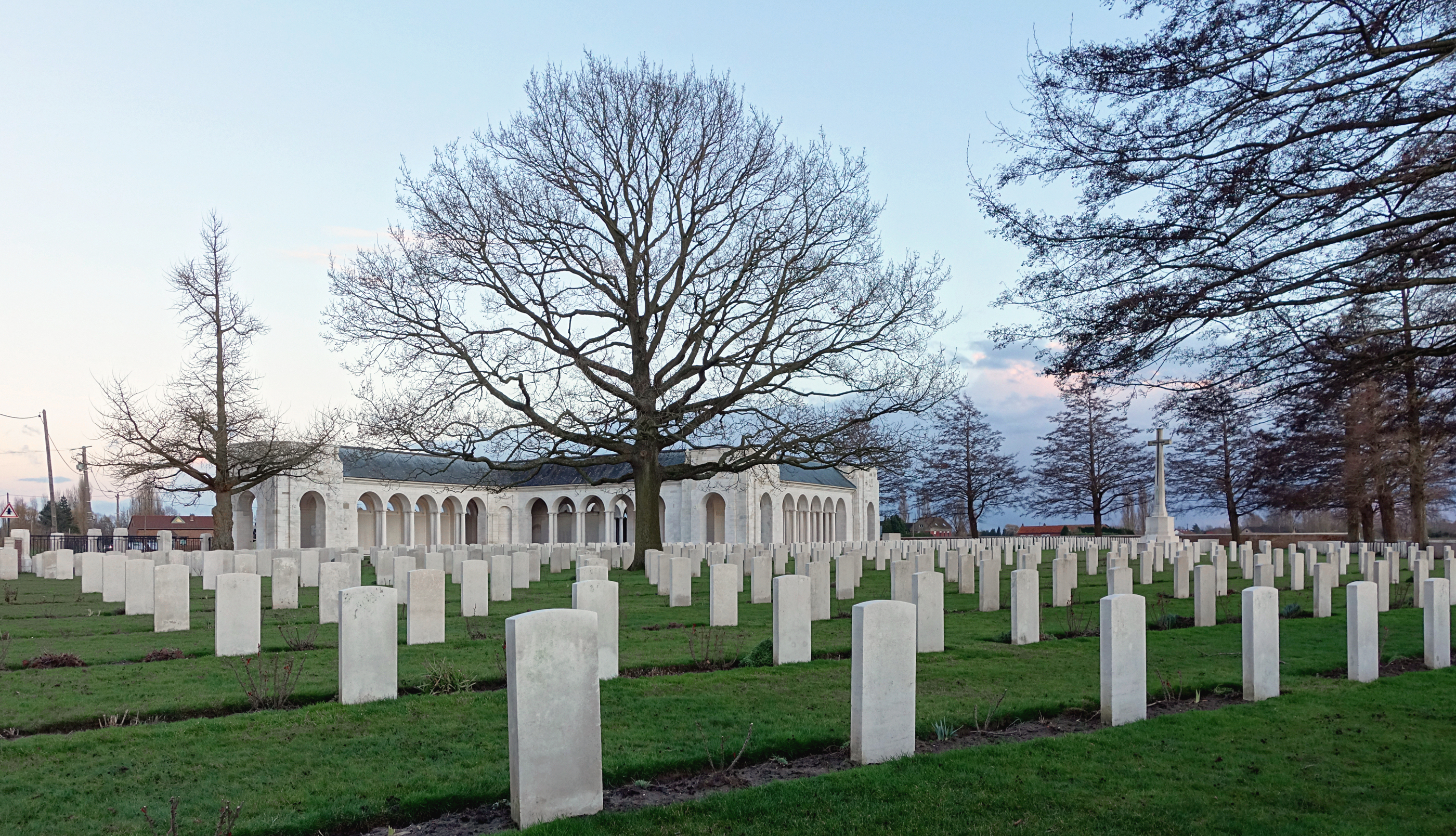
- For British and Commonwealth forces
- Unveiled: 22 March 1930
- Location: 50°33′36.16″N 02°43′22.01″E
- Designed by: J. R. Truelove
- To the Glory of God and in Memory of 13,482 British officers and men who fell fighting in this neighbourhood from October 1914 to September 1915 whose names are here recorded but to whom the fortune of war denied the known and honoured burial given to their comrades in death

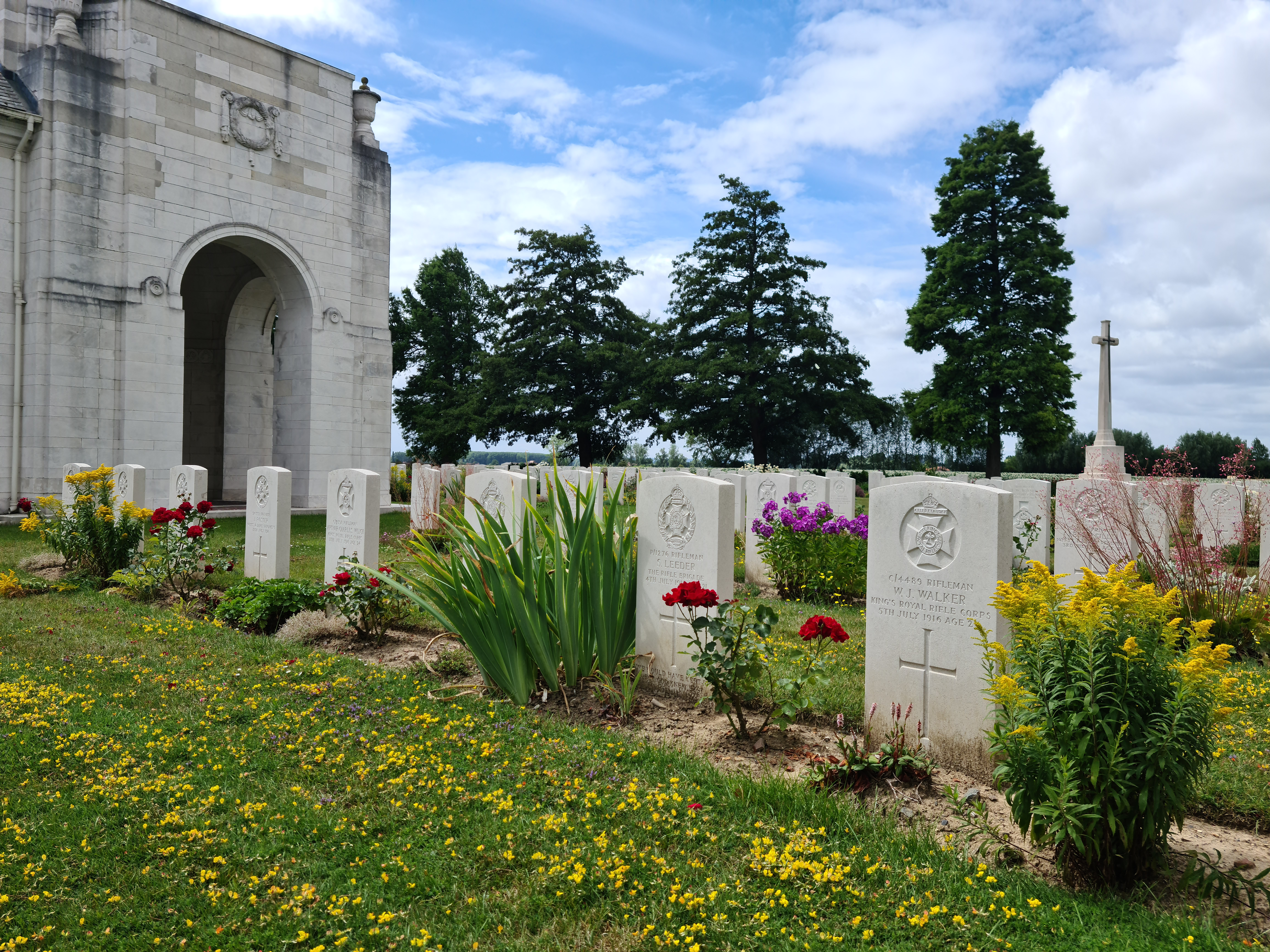
Touret Memorial

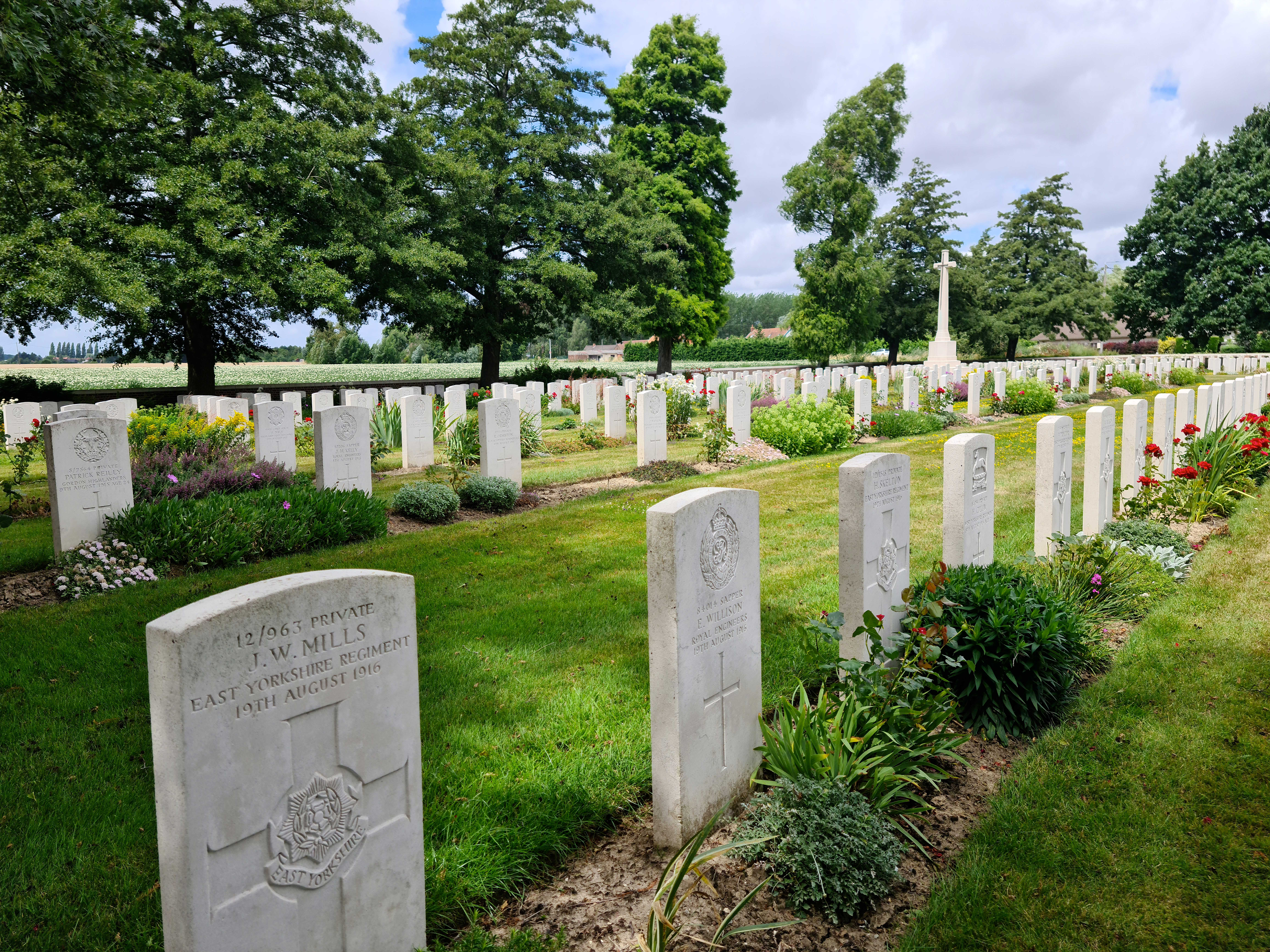
The cemetery at Touret Memorial

The Le Touret Memorial is a World War I memorial, located near the former commune of Richebourg-l'Avoué, in the Pas-de-Calais region of France. The memorial lists 13,389 names of British and Commonwealth soldiers with no known grave who were killed in the area prior to the start of the Battle of Loos on 25 September 1915. The exceptions are Canadian soldiers, whose names are commemorated at the Vimy Memorial, and Indian Army soldiers, whose names appear on the Neuve-Chapelle Memorial. Those commemorated on this memorial include the Victoria Cross recipients Abraham Acton, William Anderson, Jacob Rivers, and Edward Barber. Also commemorated here are Clive and Arnold Baxter, brothers who were killed on the same day, 25 January 1915, in the Brickstacks area of Cuinchy.

Designed by J. R. Truelove, the memorial is a loggia surrounding an open rectangular court. The inscription is over the entrance, and given in both French and English. The memorial was unveiled on 22 March 1930 by Lord Tyrrell, a diplomat who was present in his role as British Ambassador to France.
