= Robert Colquhoun (East India Company officer) =

British East India Company Army officer

Sir Robert David Colquhoun, 12th Baronet (15 May 1786 – 2 June 1838) served in the British Indian Army. In 1815 in present-day Almora, holding the rank of lieutenant, he organized the Kemaoon Battalion, predecessor of the 3rd Gorkha Rifles, to fight in what became known as the Gurkha War.

Colquhoun was a plant collector and early patron of the Calcutta Botanical Gardens. The evergreen genus Colquhounia was named in his honor.

There is a memorial to Colquhoun in the Holy Ghost cemetery in Basingstoke. Its headstone says that he died at sea aboard the ship Reliance.
