= Dallas, Moray =

Coordinates: 57.553°N 3.467°W

Dallas: Scottish Gaelic: Dalais
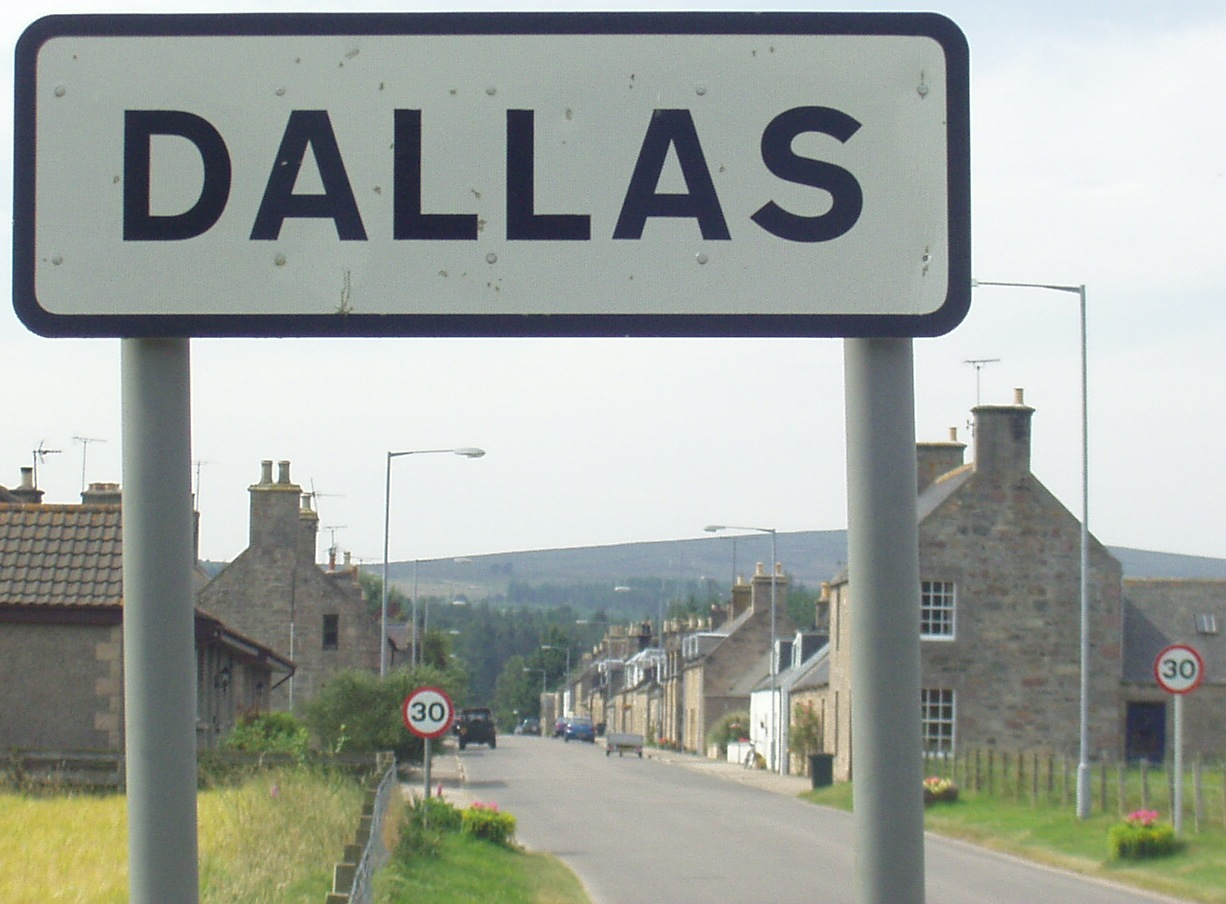
- Dallas Village looking South West along the central road, with the hill of Mill Buie in the background

- Location within Moray
- Population: 138 (1971 census)
- OS grid reference: NJ124523
- Council area: Moray
- Country: Scotland
- Sovereign state: United Kingdom
- Post town: Forres
- Postcode district: IV36
- Dialling code: 01343
- Police: Scotland
- Fire: Scottish
- Ambulance: Scottish
- UK Parliament: Moray West, Nairn and Strathspey
- Scottish Parliament: Moray

Dallas (Scottish Gaelic: Dalais [ˈt̪al̪ˠɪʃ]) is a small village in Moray, Scotland. It is located 12 miles (19 km) south west of Elgin just off the B9010 road. It has a population of between 150 and 200.

== Etymology ==
The name Dallas was first recorded in 1226 as Dolays Mychel, and may be of Pictish origin. It is likely to involve the element dol, meaning "water haugh, meadow". The second element may be equivalent to the Brittonic gwas meaning "an abode".

== Community ==
Dallas is known locally as having a good community spirit. It holds a village gala every July in which local girls are picked to be the Gala Queen and her attendants. The village will hold events daily including a games day that involves a race through the village in wheelbarrows or prams followed by "It's a knockout"-style team games. The gala is a bigger event than might be expected for such a small village, and attracts many visitors from surrounding areas.

== Features ==
There is a lot of forestry in the region. The gardens of Dallas Lodge are often open to the public.

The Church of St Michael in the village dates from 1793 but is built on the site of an earlier church known from records to have been in existence in 1226. Located in the churchyard is the Market Cross (also known as St Michael's Cross), possibly dating from the 15th century.

== Notable persons ==
William Anderson VC (November 1885 – 13 March 1915), a World War I recipient of the Victoria Cross, was born in Dallas.

Also, Jane Cumming, who was involved in a libel suit, died in Dallas.

== Dallas Castle ==
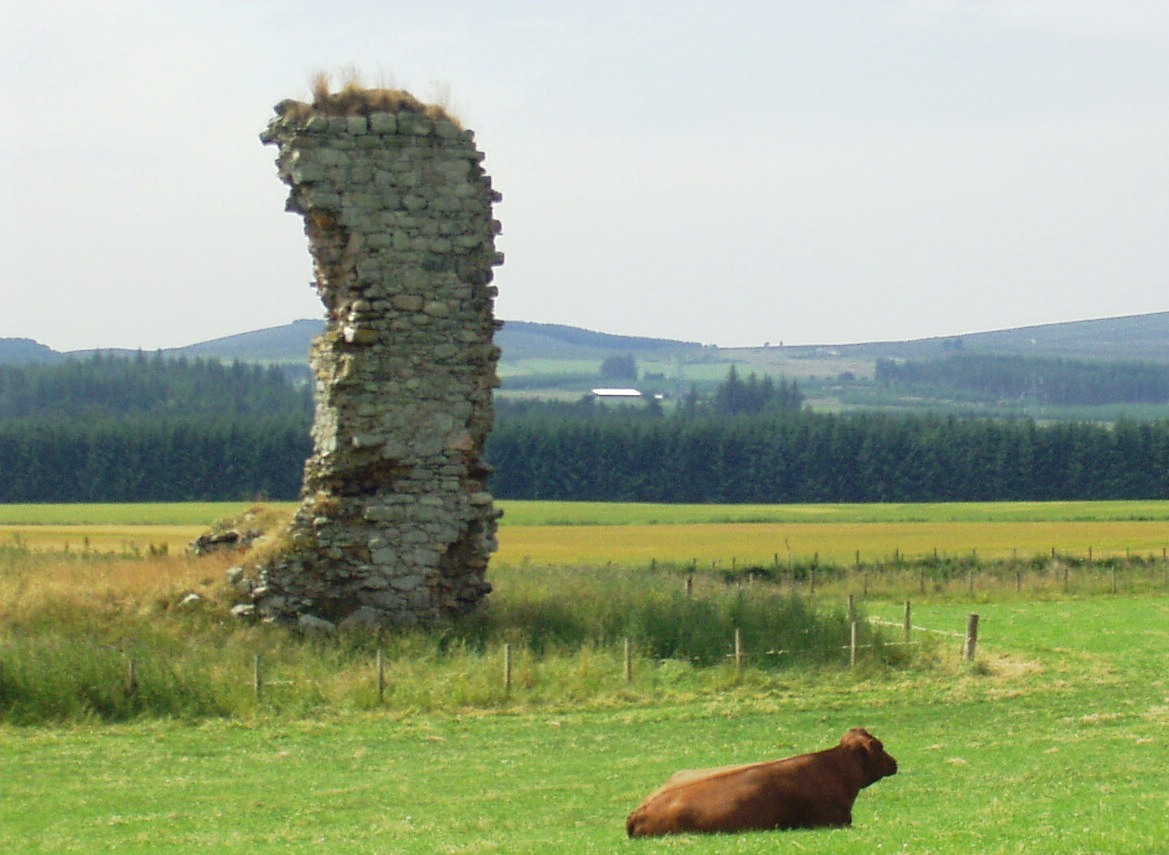
Ruins of Dallas Castle

Dallas Castle is barely standing, with only one small wall remaining. Tradition says it was used by the Wolf of Badenoch as a storehouse.

== Education ==
Secondary students are in the catchment zone of Forres Academy in Forres.
