= 49th Garhwal Rifles =

- Active: 1901
- Country: Indian Empire
- Branch: Army
- Type: Infantry
- Part of: Bengal Army

This was formed in 1901 as a regiment of the Bengal light Infantry and re designated as 2nd battalion of 39th Garhwal Rifles.
