= Battle of Neuve-Chapelle =

1915 battle in the First World War

- Part of the Western Front of the First World War
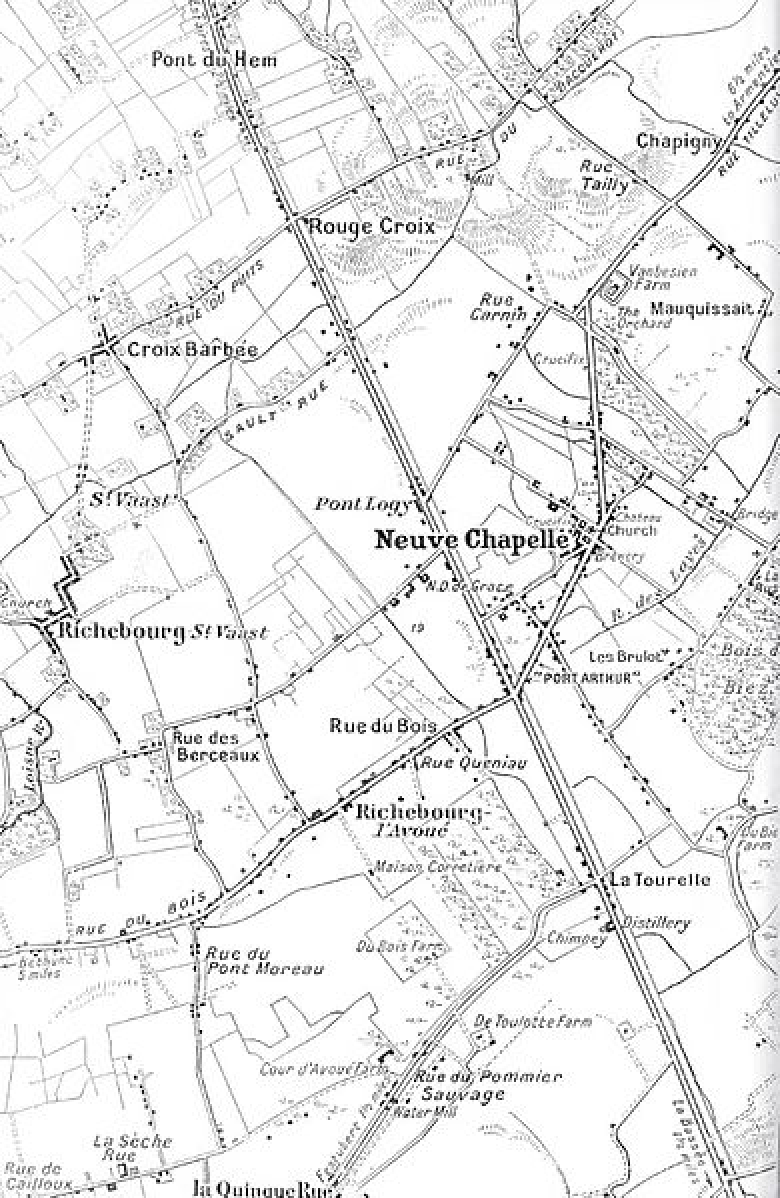
- Neuve Chapelle area, 1914–1915
| Date | 10–13 March 1915 |
| Location | Artois region, France 50°35′06″N 02°46′39″E |
| Result | See Analysis section |
| Territorial changes | Capture of Neuve-Chapelle village |

Belligerents
| British Empire: Canada; India; United Kingdom | German Empire |

Commanders and leaders
| John French; Douglas Haig | Crown Prince Rupprecht |

Strength
| 4 divisions | 2 divisions |

Casualties and losses
| 12,892; British: c. 7,000; Raj: c. 4,200 | 9–20 March: 8,500–10,000 |

The Battle of Neuve-Chapelle (10–13 March 1915) took place in the First World War in Artois in France. The attack was intended to cause a rupture in the German lines, which would then be exploited with a rush to the Aubers Ridge and possibly Lille. A French assault at Vimy Ridge on the Artois plateau was also planned to threaten the road, rail and canal junctions at La Bassée from the south as the British attacked from the north. The British attackers broke through German defences in a salient at the village of Neuve-Chapelle but the success could not be exploited.

If the French Tenth Army captured Vimy Ridge and the north end of the Artois plateau, from Lens to La Bassée, as the First Army took Aubers Ridge from La Bassée to Lille, a further advance of 10–15 mi (16–24 km) would cut the roads and railways used by the Germans, to supply the troops in the Noyon Salient from Arras south to Rheims. The French part of the offensive was cancelled when the British were unable to relieve the French IX Corps north of Ypres, which had been intended to move south for the attack and the Tenth Army contribution was reduced to support from its heavy artillery.

The Royal Flying Corps (RFC) carried out aerial photography, despite poor weather, which enabled the attack front to be mapped to a depth of 1,500 yd (1,400 m) for the first time and for 1,500 copies of 1:5,000 scale maps to be distributed to each corps. The battle was the first deliberately planned British offensive and showed the form which position warfare took for the rest of the war on the Western Front. Tactical surprise and a break-in were achieved, after the First Army prepared the attack with great attention to detail. After the first set-piece attack, unexpected delays slowed the tempo of operations and command was undermined by communication failures. Infantry-artillery co-operation broke down when the telephone system ceased to work and the Germans had time to send in reinforcements and dig a new line.

The British attempted to renew the advance, by attacking where the original assault had failed, instead of reinforcing success, and a fresh attack with the same detailed preparation as that on the first day became necessary. A big German counter-attack by twenty infantry battalions (c. 16,000 men) early on 12 March was a costly failure. Sir Douglas Haig, the First Army commander, cancelled further attacks and ordered the captured ground to be consolidated, preparatory to a new attack further north. An acute shortage of artillery ammunition made another attack impossible, apart from a local effort by the 7th Division, which was another costly failure. The Germans strengthened the defences opposite the British and increased the number of troops in the area. One consequence of the battle was that the French became cautiously optimistic that British forces could be reliable in offensive operations.

== Battle ==
British Artillery Neuve Chapelle (10–13 March 1915)
| Gun | No | shells |
|---|---|---|
| 13-pdr gun | 60 | 600 |
| 18-pdr gun | 324 | 410 |
| 4.5-inch how | 54 | 212 |
| 60-pdr gun | 12 | 450 |
| 4.7-inch gun | 32 | 437 |
| 6-inch how | 28 | 285 |
| 6-inch gun | 4 | 400 |
| 9.2-inch how | 3 | 333 |
| 2.75-inch gun | 12 | 500 |
| 15-inch how | 1 | 40 |

Despite poor weather, the early stages of the battle went extremely well for the British. The RFC quickly secured aerial dominance and set about bombarding railways and German reserves en route. At 7:30 a.m. on 10 March, the British began a thirty-five-minute artillery bombardment by ninety 18-pounder field guns of the Indian Corps and IV Corps, on the German wire which was destroyed within ten minutes. The remaining fifteen 18-pounder field gun batteries, six 6-inch howitzer siege batteries and six QF 4.5-inch howitzer batteries, with sixty howitzers, fired on the German front-line trenches. The trenches were 3 ft (0.91 m) deep, with breastworks 4 ft (1.2 m) high but were unable to withstand a howitzer bombardment. The 1st Canadian Division at Fleurbaix, several kilometres north-east of Neuve Chapelle, provided artillery support and machine-gun fire as a diversion to prevent the Germans from reinforcing the sector. The artillery bombardment was followed by an infantry assault at 8:05 a.m.

The Garhwal Brigade of the Meerut Division, Indian Corps attacked with all four battalions on a 600 yd (550 m) front, from Port Arthur to Pont Logy. On the right the attack quickly collapsed, both companies losing direction and veering to the right. The attack confronted a part of the German defences that had not been bombarded by the artillery and before the mistake was realised the two support companies followed suit. The Indian troops forced their way through the German wire and took 200 yd (180 m) of the German front trench, despite many casualties. The three Lahore battalions to the left advanced in lines of platoon fifty paces apart, swiftly crossing the 200 yd (180 m) of no man's land, overran the German infantry and pressed on to the German support trench, the attack taking only fifteen minutes. The leading companies then advanced beyond the Port Arthur–Neuve Chapelle road without waiting for the planned thirty-minute artillery preparation and took the village by 9:00 a.m. along with 200 prisoners and five machine-guns.

A gap of 250 yd (230 m) had been created by the loss of direction on the right, where the German garrison had been severely bombarded but the survivors, about two platoons of the 10th Company, Infantry Regiment 16, fought on. A fresh British attack was arranged from the north, in which the Garhwal Brigade were to join in with a frontal assault. German troops infiltrated northwards before being forced back by bombers (the Grenadier Guards had objected to specialist grenade throwers usurping their name) and bayonet charges but the Indian attack was stopped by the Germans, 200 yd (180 m) south of the Port Arthur–Neuve Chapelle road. Haig ordered more attacks that day, with similarly disappointing results.

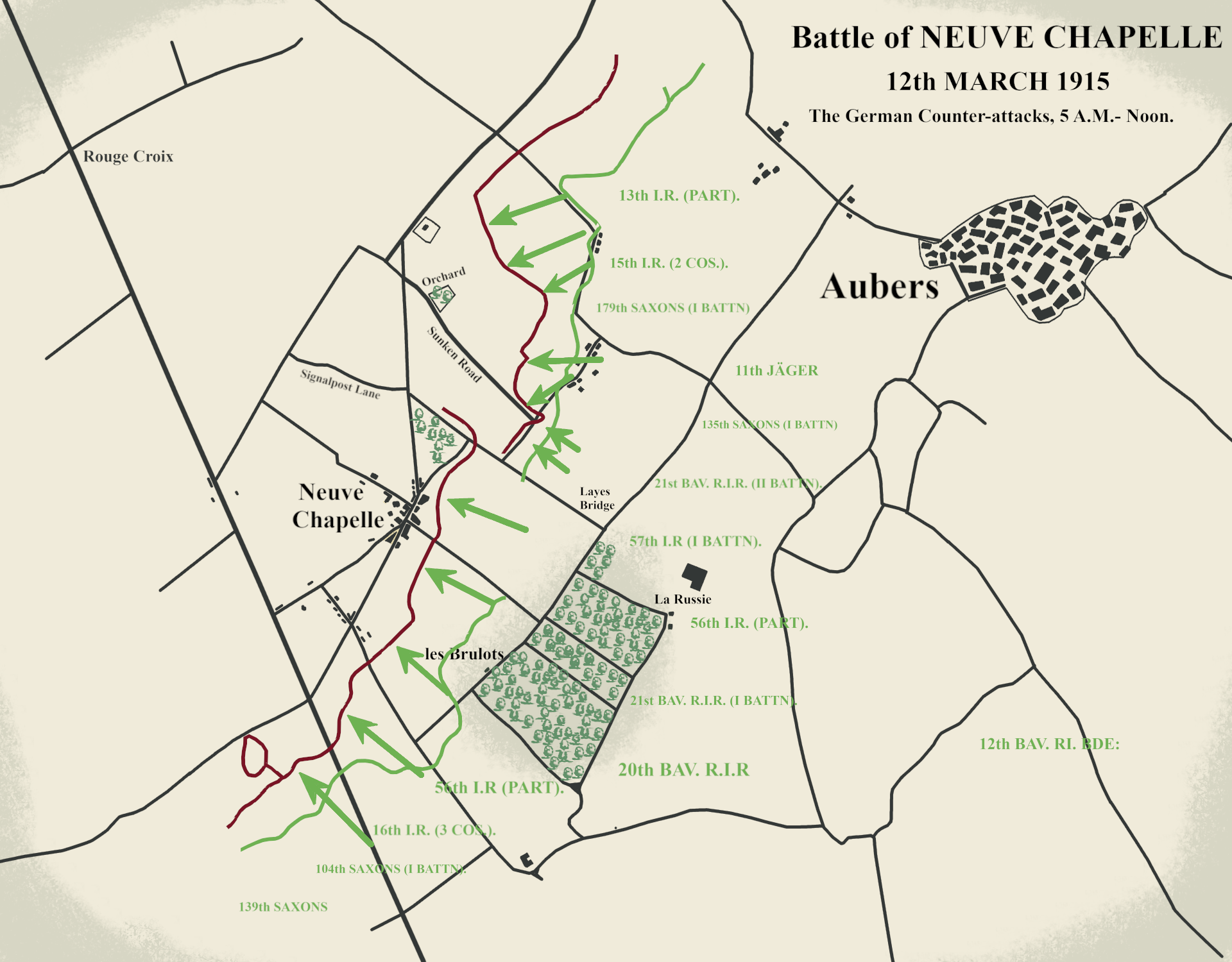
German counter-attacks, 12 March 1915

The German defences in the centre were quickly overrun on a 1,600 yd (1,500 m) front and Neuve Chapelle was captured by 10:00 a.m. At Haig's request, the British Commander-in-Chief, Field Marshal Sir John French, released the 5th Cavalry Brigade to exploit the expected breakthrough. On the left of the attack, two companies of Jäger Battalion 11 (with c. 200 men and a machine-gun) delayed the advance for more than six hours until forced to retreat, which left no time to resume the advance. Although aerial photography had been useful, it was not sufficient to identify efficiently German strong points. Primitive communications also meant that the British commanders had been unable to keep in touch with each other, the battle became uncoordinated and this disrupted the delivery of supplies. On 12 March, the 6th Army (Crown Prince Rupprecht) counter-attacked; the attempt failed but forced the British to use most of their artillery ammunition; the British offensive was postponed on 13 March and abandoned two days later.

== Aftermath ==
=== Analysis ===
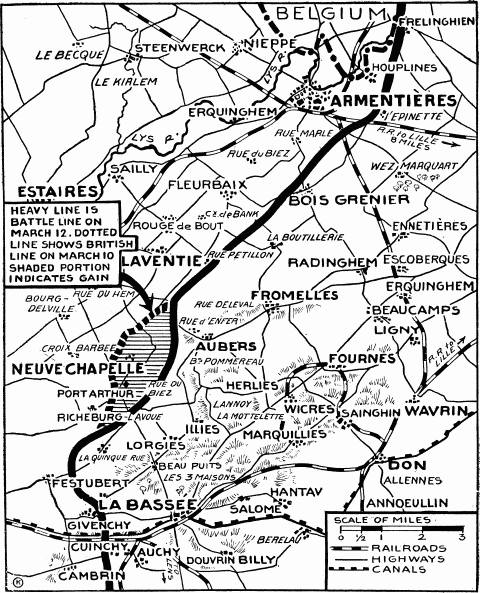
Positions following the battle, New York Times, May 1915

The battle at Neuve-Chapelle showed that trench defences could be breached if the attack was carefully prepared and disguised to achieve at least local surprise. After the initial shock, the German defenders recovered, just as the attackers were beset by delays, loss of communication and disorganisation. In his report at the end of March, Major-General John Du Cane wrote that the First Army command system disintegrated after the capture of Neuve-Chapelle. Although Haig claimed he had made his intent plain to his subordinates, he felt they had not grasped the "spirit" of the plan and had failed to press on when initial objectives had been captured. One of the subordinates later claimed that pressing on was pointless, due to the lack of ammunition.

The British telephone system proved vulnerable to German artillery-fire and the movement of troops along communication trenches was delayed by far more than the most pessimistic expectations. Equilibrium between attack and defence quickly resumed, which could only be upset by another set-piece attack, after a delay for preparation which gave the defenders just as much time to reorganise. The attack front was found to have been wide enough to overcome the small number of German reserves but the attackers had not been ordered to assist units which had been held up. British reinforcements were sent to renew failed attacks rather than reinforce success. Small numbers of German troops in strong-points and isolated trenches, had been able to maintain a volume of small-arms fire sufficient to stop the advance of far greater numbers of attackers.

The battle had no strategic effect but showed that the British were capable of mounting an organised attack, after several winter months of static warfare. They recaptured about 2 km (1.2 mi) of ground. In 1961 Alan Clark wrote that relations with the French improved, because British commanders had shown themselves willing to order attacks regardless of loss and quoted Brigadier-General John Charteris that

... England will have to accustom herself to far greater losses than those of Neuve Chapelle before we finally crush the German army.

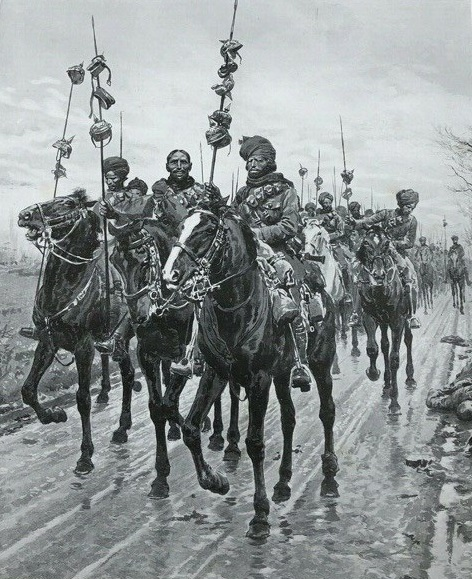
Fortunino Matania illustration of Bengal Lancers returning from Port Arthur after the capture of Neuve-Chapelle

In 2004, George Cassar called the battle a British tactical success but that the strategic intentions had not been met. Jack Sheldon was less complimentary and wrote that although the attack had shocked the 6th Army, it quickly amended its defensive tactics and that the British had also been shocked that such a carefully planned attack had collapsed after the first day. Sheldon called the British analysis of the battle "bluster" and wrote that Joseph Joffre, the French commander, praised the results of the first day, then dismissed the significance of the attack "Mais ce fut un succès sans lendemain" (But it was a success which led to nothing.). The German and French armies began to revise their low opinion of the BEF, the Germans having assumed that the British would remain on the defensive to release French troops and had risked keeping as few troops as possible opposite the British. The German defences were hurriedly strengthened and more troops brought in to garrison them. The French had also expected that the British troops would only release French soldiers from quiet areas and that British participation in French attacks would be a secondary activity. After the battle French commanders made more effort to co-operate with the BEF and plan a combined attack from Arras to Armentières.

The expenditure of artillery ammunition on the first day had consumed about 30 per cent of the field-gun ammunition in the First Army, which was equivalent to 17 days' shell production per gun. After the battle, French reported to Field Marshal Lord Kitchener, the British Secretary of State for War, that fatigue and the shortage of ammunition had forced a suspension of the offensive. On 15 March French abandoned the offensive as the supply of field-gun ammunition was inadequate. News of the ammunition shortage led to the Shell Crisis of 1915 which, along with the resignation of Admiral Fisher over the naval attack on the Dardanelles, brought down the Liberal government. The Prime Minister H. H. Asquith formed a new coalition government and appointed David Lloyd George as Minister of Munitions. It was a recognition that the whole economy would have to be adapted for war, if the Allies were to prevail on the Western Front. The battle also affected British tactical thinking with the idea that infantry offensives accompanied by artillery barrages could break the trench warfare stalemate.

=== Casualties ===
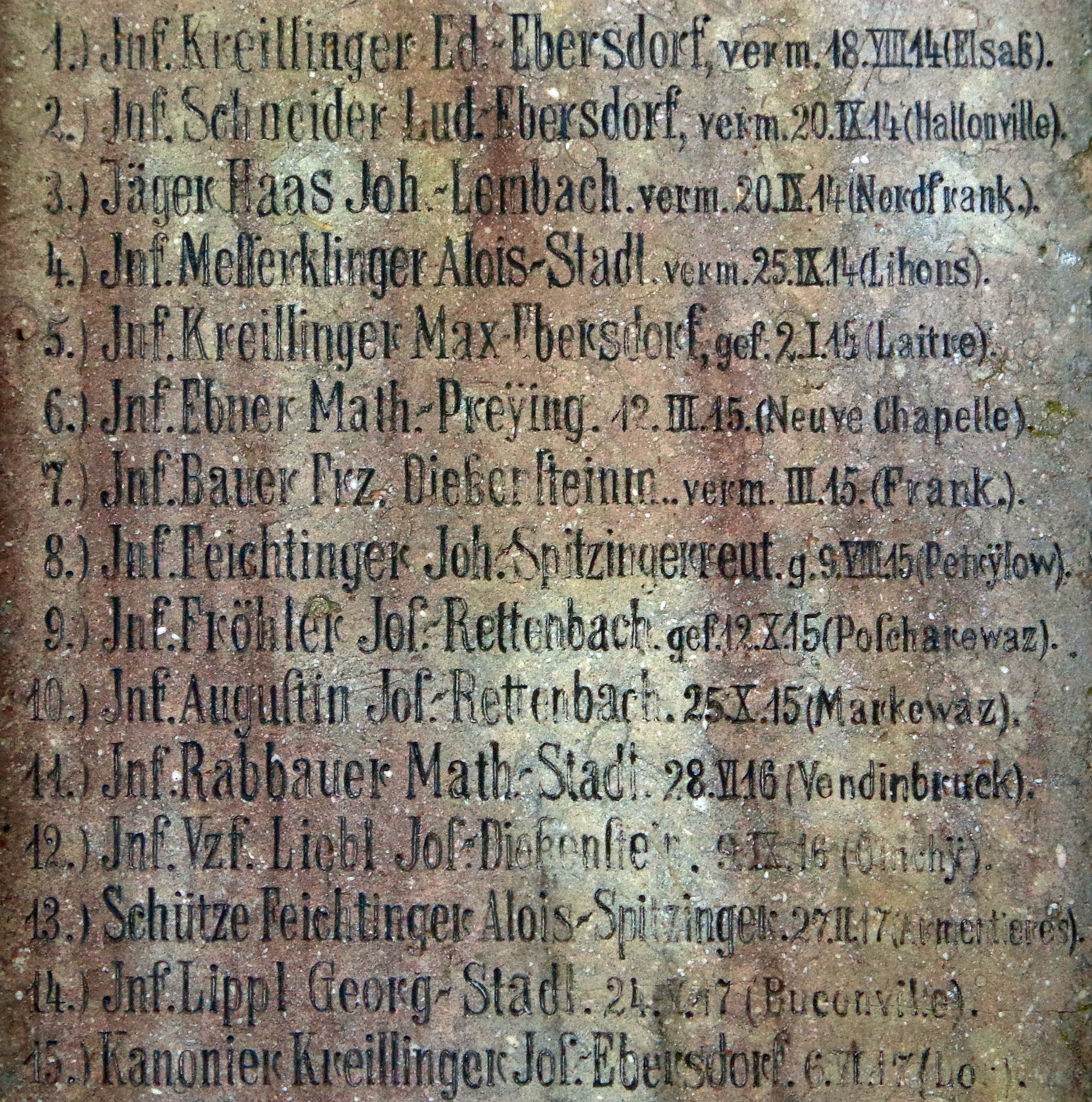
Detail of the war memorial in the village of Preying (Saldenburg, Bavaria) naming Infantryman Mathias Ebner, killed during the Battle of Neuve Chapelle, 12 March 1915

The British suffered 7,000 casualties and the Indian Corps 4,200 of the 40,000 troops in the offensive. The 7th Division suffered 2,791 casualties, the 8th Division 4,814, the Meerut Division 2,353 and the Lahore Division 1,694. In 2010 Humphries and Maker recorded German casualties from 9 to 20 March as c. 10,000 men; in 2018, Jonathan Boff wrote that the British suffered 12,592 casualties and that the German official history estimate of "almost 10,000 men", was closer to 8,500, according to the records of the 6th Army and the diary kept by Crown Prince Rupprecht. The 6th Bavarian Reserve Division suffered 6,017 casualties from 11 to 13 March, Bavarian Reserve Infantry Regiment 21 1,665 casualties, Infantry Regiment 14 of VII Corps suffered 666 casualties from 7 to 12 March and Infantry Regiment 13 1,322 casualties from 6 to 27 March. During its diversionary assault in support of the main offensive, the 1st Canadian Division suffered 300 casualties, nearly 100 fatal.

== Commemoration and legacy ==
The Neuve-Chapelle Indian Memorial commemorates 4,700 Indian soldiers and labourers who died on the Western Front during the First World War and have no known graves; the location was chosen because it was at the Battle of Neuve-Chapelle that the Indian Corps fought its first big offensive action. War graves of the Indian Corps and the Indian Labour Corps are found at Ayette, Etaples, Souchez and Neuve-Chapelle. Along with the Indian Corps, the battle was the first big battle of the Canadian Expeditionary Force. (Note: The first action by the Canadian Expeditionary Force occurred on 28 February 1915, when the Princess Patricia's Canadian Light Infantry conducted a trench raid along with a larger British brigade.)

== Victoria Cross ==
- Corporal William Anderson, 2nd Battalion, The Green Howards.
- Private Edward Barber, 1st Battalion, The Grenadier Guards.
- Private William Buckingham, 2nd Battalion, Leicestershire Regiment.
- Company Sergeant-Major Harry Daniels, 2nd Battalion, The Rifle Brigade.
- Captain Charles Calveley Foss, 2nd Battalion, Bedfordshire Regiment.
- Lance Corporal Wilfred Dolby Fuller, 1st Battalion, The Grenadier Guards.
- Lieutenant Cyril Gordon Martin, 56th Field Company R. E. (3rd Division).
- Rifleman Gabbar Singh Negi, 2nd Battalion, 39th Garhwal Rifles.
- Corporal Cecil Noble, 2nd Battalion, The Rifle Brigade.
- Private Jacob Rivers, 1st Battalion, Sherwood Foresters.

== See also ==
- Indian Army during World War I
- Battle of Hill 60 (Western Front)
