= 39th Garhwal Rifles =

- Active: 1887–1922
- Country: British India
- Branch: British Indian Army
- Type: Infantry
- Part of: Bengal Army (to 1895); Bengal Command
- Uniform: Green; faced black
- Engagements: World War I Waziristan campaign 1919–1920

The 39th Garhwal Rifles was an infantry regiment of the British Indian Army.

== History ==
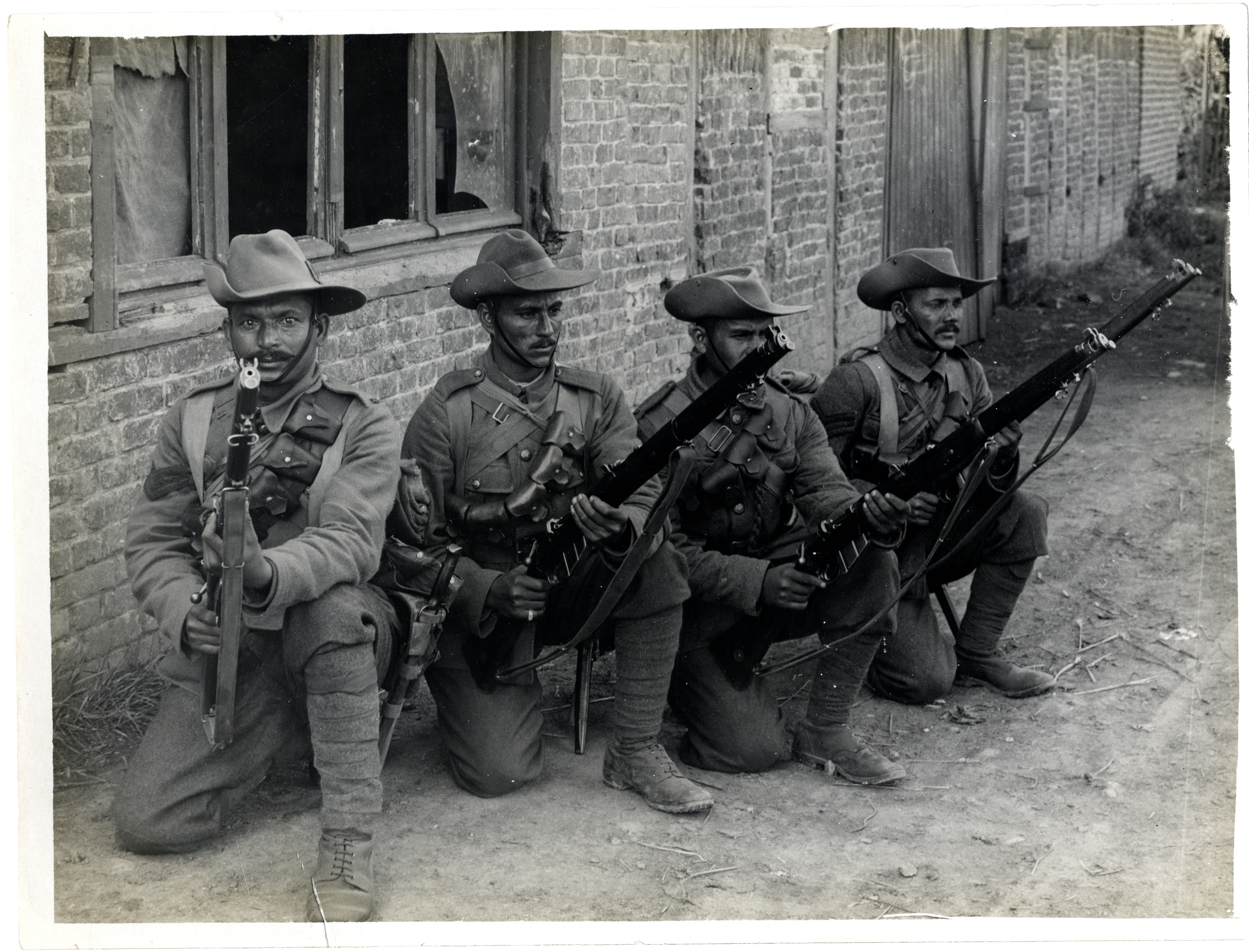
Typical Garhwal riflemen (Estaire La Bassée Road, France). Photographer- H. D. Girdwood. (13875264813)

The first proposal to raise a separate Regiment of the Garhwali's was originated by HE Field Marshal The Hon’ble Sir FS Roberts, VC, KG, KP, GCB, OM, GCSI, GCIE, C-in-C, India in January 1886. In April 1887, orders were issued for raising of the 2nd Battalion of the Third (Kumaon) Gorkha Regiment to be composed of Garhwali's from Upper Garhwal. The initial class composition of the battalion was to consist of six companies of Garhwali's and two companies of Gorkhas. The nucleus with its British officers assembled under Lt Col EP Mainwaring of the Fourth Gorkhas at Almora in May 1887. The date of raising of the battalion was 5 May 1887. Later that year, the battalion marched to Kaludanda (Lansdowne), where it arrived on 4 November 1887. On 1 March 1901, the Second Battalion was raised at Lansdowne by Lt Col JHT Evatt, DSO and was designated as the 49th (The Garhwal Rifles) Regiment of the Bengal Infantry. In November 1901, both the battalions were redesignated as the 1st and 2nd Battalions of The 39th Garhwal Rifles.

== Victoria Cross recipients ==
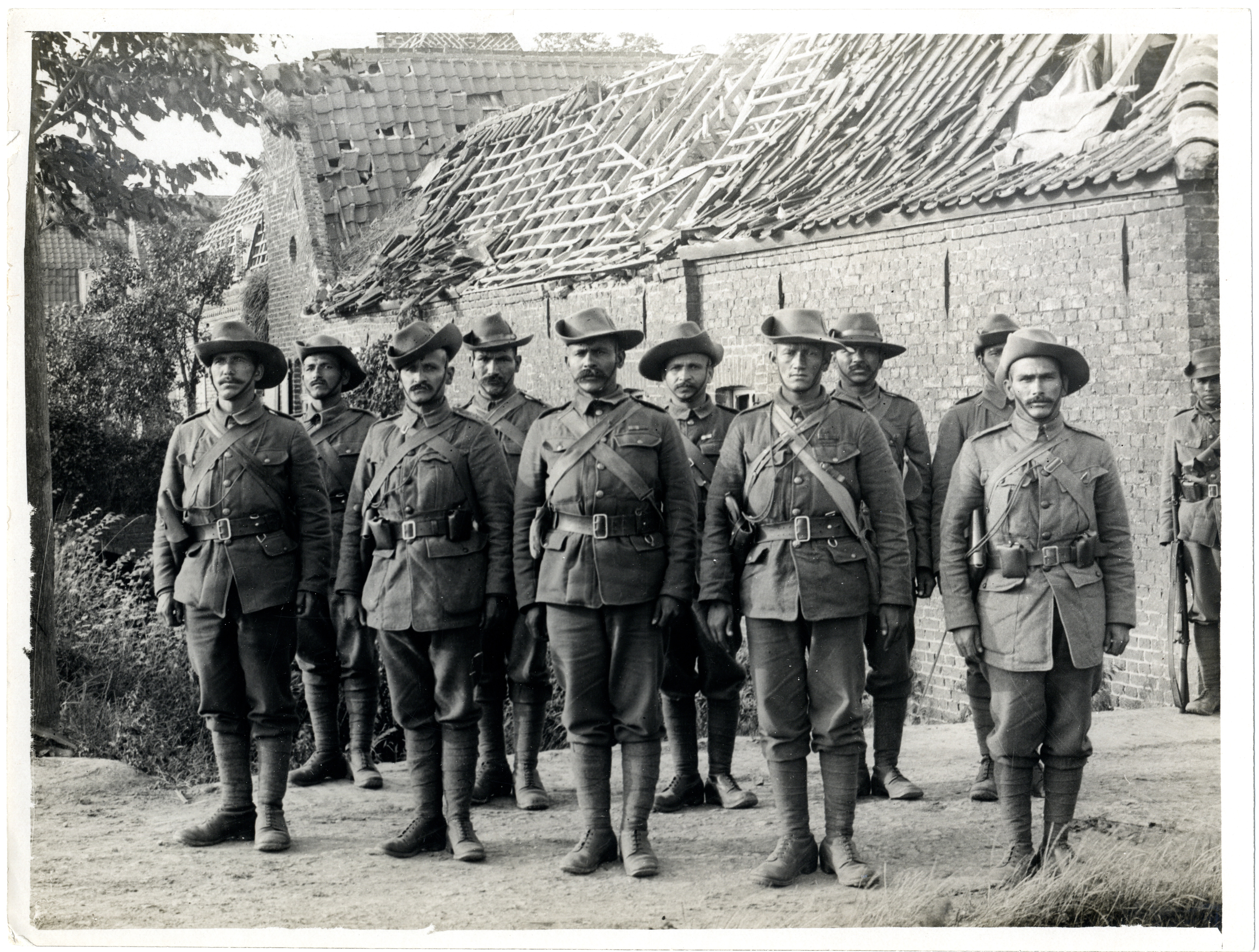
Indian officers, 39th Garhwalis (Estaire La Bassée Road, France). Photographer- H. D. Girdwood. (13875608644)

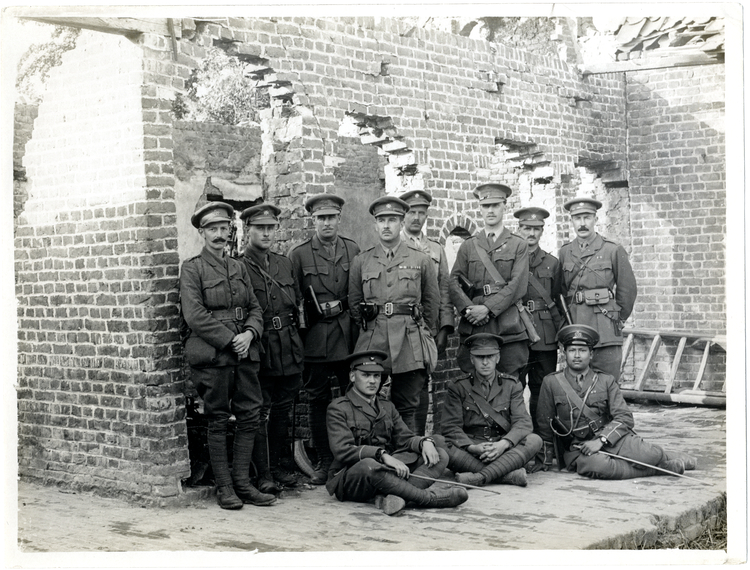
Officers of the 39th Garhwalis (Photo 24-241)

The Victoria Cross (VC) is the highest and most prestigious award for gallantry in the face of the enemy that can be awarded to British and Commonwealth forces. Indian troops only became eligible for the award in 1911. Three members of the regiment won the award:

- Darwan Singh Negi was among the earliest Indian recipients of the Victoria Cross. A Naik in the 1st Battalion, 39th Garhwal Rifles during World War I when the following deed took place for which he was awarded the VC, the citation was published in a supplement to The London Gazette of 4 December 1914 (dated 7 December 1914) and read:

For great gallantry on the night of the 23rd–24th November, near Festubert, France, when the regiment was engaged in retaking and clearing the enemy out of our trenches, and, although wounded in two places in the head, and also in the arm, being one of the first to push round each successive traverse, in the face of severe fire from bombs and rifles at the closest range.

His award was gazetted on the same date as that of Sepoy Khudadad Khan, but Negi is considered the first Indian VC winner.

- Gabar Singh Negi was a Rifleman in the 2nd Battalion, 39th Garhwal Rifles, during World War I and was awarded the Victoria Cross for his actions on 10 March 1915 at the Battle of Neuve Chapelle, France.

During an attack on the German position Rifleman Gabar Singh Negi was one of a bayonet party with bombs who entered their main trench, and was the first man to go round each traverse, driving back the enemy until they were eventually forced to surrender. He was killed during this engagement.

- William David Kenny was a lieutenant in the 4th Battalion, 39th Garhwal Rifles during the Waziristan Campaign when the following deed took place for which he was awarded the VC. The citation was published in a supplement to the London Gazette of 7 September 1920 (dated 9 September 1920):

For most conspicuous bravery and devotion to duty near Kot Kai (Waziristan), on 2 January 1920, when in command of a company holding an advanced covering position, which was repeatedly attacked by the Mahsuds in greatly superior numbers.

For over four hours this officer maintained his position, repulsing three determined attacks, being foremost in the hand-to-hand fighting which took place, and repeatedly engaging the enemy with bomb and bayonet. His gallant leadership undoubtedly saved the situation and kept intact the right flank, on which depended the success of the operation and the safety of the troops in rear.

In the subsequent withdrawal, recognising that a diversion was necessary to enable the withdrawal of the company, which was impeded by their wounded, with a handful of his men he turned back and counter-attacked the pursuing enemy, and, with the rest of his party, was killed fighting to the last.

This very gallant act of self-sacrifice not only enabled the wounded to be withdrawn, but also averted a situation which must have resulted in considerable loss of life.

== Predecessor names ==
- 2nd Battalion, 3rd (Kamaon) Gurkha Regiment – 1887
- 39th (Garhwali) Bengal Infantry – 1890
- 39th (Garhwal Rifles) Bengal Infantry – 1892
- 39th Garhwal Rifles – 1903

== See also ==
- 49th Garhwal Rifles

== Sources ==
- Barthorp, Michael; Burn, Jeffrey (1979). Indian Infantry Regiments 1860–1914. Osprey. ISBN 0-85045-307-0.
- Edmonds, J. E.; Wynne, G. C. (1995) [1927]. Military Operations France and Belgium, 1915: Winter 1914–15 Battle of Neuve Chapelle: Battles of Ypres. History of the Great War Based on Official Documents by Direction of the Historical Section of the Committee of Imperial Defence. Vol. I (IWM and Battery Press reprint ed.). London: Macmillan. ISBN 0-89839-218-7.
- Haythornthwaite, Philip J. (1996). The World War One Source Book. London: Arms and Armour Press. ISBN 1-85409-351-7.
- Moberly, F. J. (1997a) [1923]. The Campaign in Mesopotamia 1914–1918, Outbreak of Hostilities: Campaign in Lower Mesopotamia. History of the Great War Based on Official Documents, Compiled at the Request of the Government of India, under the Direction of the Historical Section of the Committee of Imperial Defence. Vol. I (Imperial War Museum & Battery Press repr. ed.). HMSO. ISBN 1-870423-30-5.
- Moberly, F. J. (1997b) [1927]. The Campaign in Mesopotamia 1914–1918. History of the Great War Based on Official Documents, Compiled at the Request of the Government of India, under the Direction of the Historical Section of the Committee of Imperial Defence. Vol. IV. Part V: The Campaign in Upper Mesopotamia, 1917–18, North-West Persia and the Caspian, 1918 (Imperial War Museum and Battery Press repr. ed.). London: HMSO. ISBN 0-89839-290-X.
- Sumner, Ian (2001). The Indian Army 1914–1947. Osprey. ISBN 1-84176-196-6.
