= Neuve-Chapelle Indian Memorial =

WW1 memorial in Pas-de-Calais, France

- Commonwealth War Graves Commission
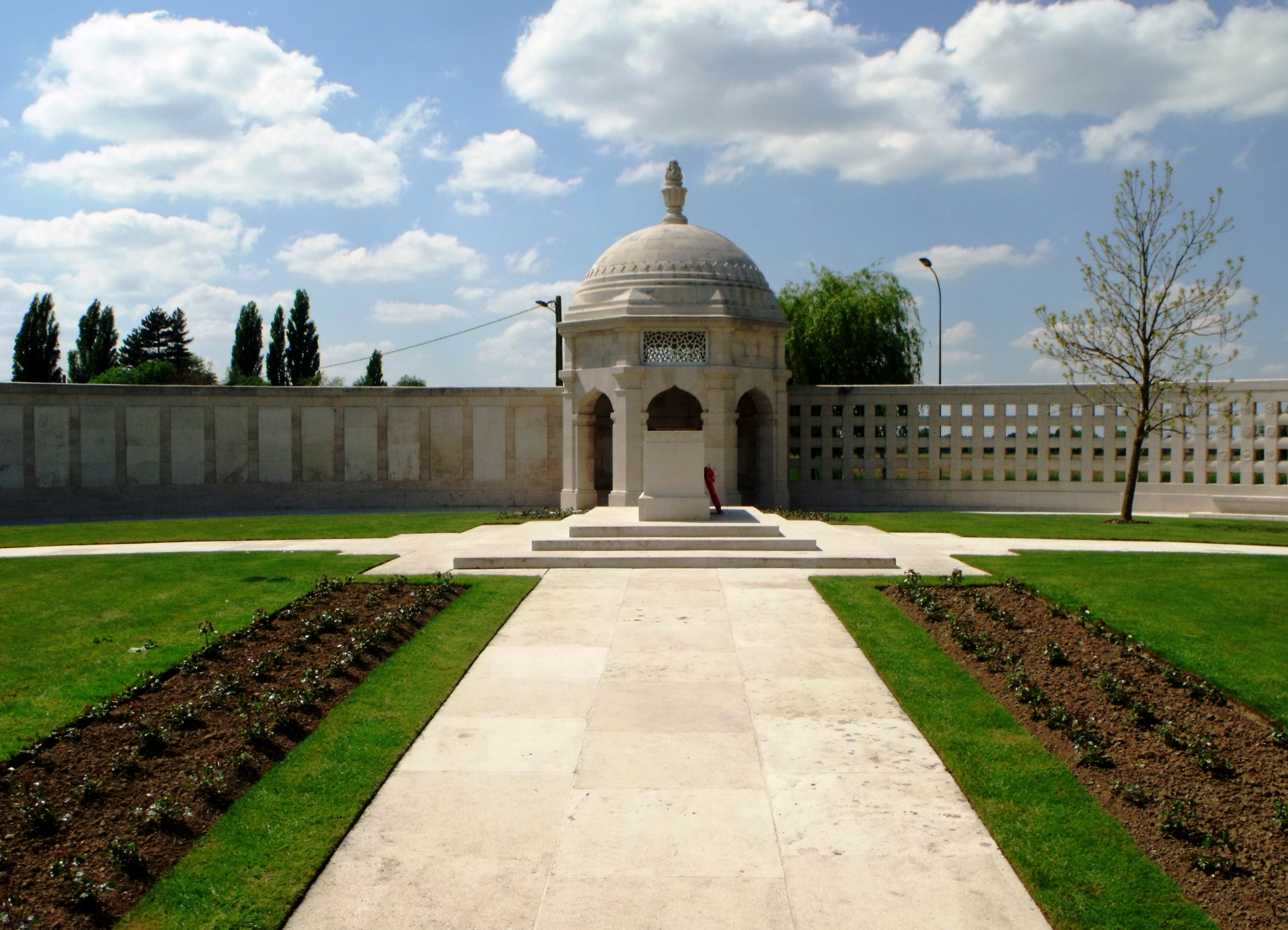
- View from inside the Neuve-Chapelle Indian Memorial
- For Army of India
- Unveiled: 7 October 1927
- Location: 50°34′31.31″N 02°46′29.21″E
- Designed by: Sir Herbert Baker and Charles Wheeler
- English: To the honour of the Army of India which fought in France and Belgium, 1914–1918, and in perpetual remembrance of those of their dead whose names are here recorded and who have no known grave French: En honneur de l'Armée de l'Inde qui a combattu en France et en Belgique 1914–1918, et pour perpétuer le souvenir de ses morts aux tombes inconnues dont les noms sont ici gravés.

UNESCO World Heritage Site
- Official name: Funerary and memory sites of the First World War (Western Front)
- Type: Cultural
- Criteria: i, ii, vi
- Designated: 2023 (45th session)
- Reference no.: 1567-PC01

The Neuve-Chapelle Indian Memorial is a World War I memorial in France, located on the outskirts of the commune of Neuve-Chapelle, in the département of Pas-de-Calais. The memorial commemorates some 4,742 Indian soldiers (including Nepal) with no known grave, who fell in battle while fighting for the British Indian Army in the First World War. The location of the memorial was chosen because of the participation by Indian troops at the Battle of Neuve-Chapelle.

== History ==
The memorial, designed by Sir Herbert Baker, with sculpture by Charles Wheeler, is a circular enclosure centred on a tall pillar that is topped by a lotus capital, and carved representations of the Star of India and the Imperial Crown. One half of the circular enclosure consists of the panels of names of the dead, while the other half is open. Other architectural and sculptural features of the memorial include carved stone tigers, and two small domed chattris. At the foot of the pillar is a Stone of Remembrance inscribed with the words: "Their name liveth for evermore." The main inscription is in both English and French, while the column also bears an inscription in English, Arabic, Devanagari and Gurmukhi: "God is One, His is the Victory".

The memorial was unveiled by F. E. Smith, 1st Earl of Birkenhead, on 7 October 1927. The Earl of Birkenhead, who was present in his role as Secretary of State for India, had served in France in World War I from 1914 to 1915 as a staff officer with the Indian Corps, and later co-wrote an official history titled The Indian Corps in France (1917, revised edition 1919). Also present at the unveiling ceremony was Marshal Ferdinand Foch, who gave a speech in French. Attending the ceremony was a contingent of troops from India to represent the units that fought in France, including Sikhs, Dogras, and Garhwalis. Foch's speech included the following addressed to them:

Return to your homes in the distant, sun-bathed East and proclaim how your countrymen drenched with their blood the cold northern land of France and Flanders, how they delivered it by their ardent spirit from the firm grip of a determined enemy; tell all India that we shall watch over their graves with the devotion due to all our dead. We shall cherish above all the memory of their example. They showed us the way, they made the first steps towards the final victory.

— Marshal Ferdinand Foch, 7 October 1927

Later additions to the memorials commemorated other Indian Army dead of both World Wars.

There are two recipients of the Victoria Cross who are commemorated on the Neuve-Chapelle Memorial: Gabar Singh Negi and William Arthur McCrae Bruce.

== Prime ministerial visit ==
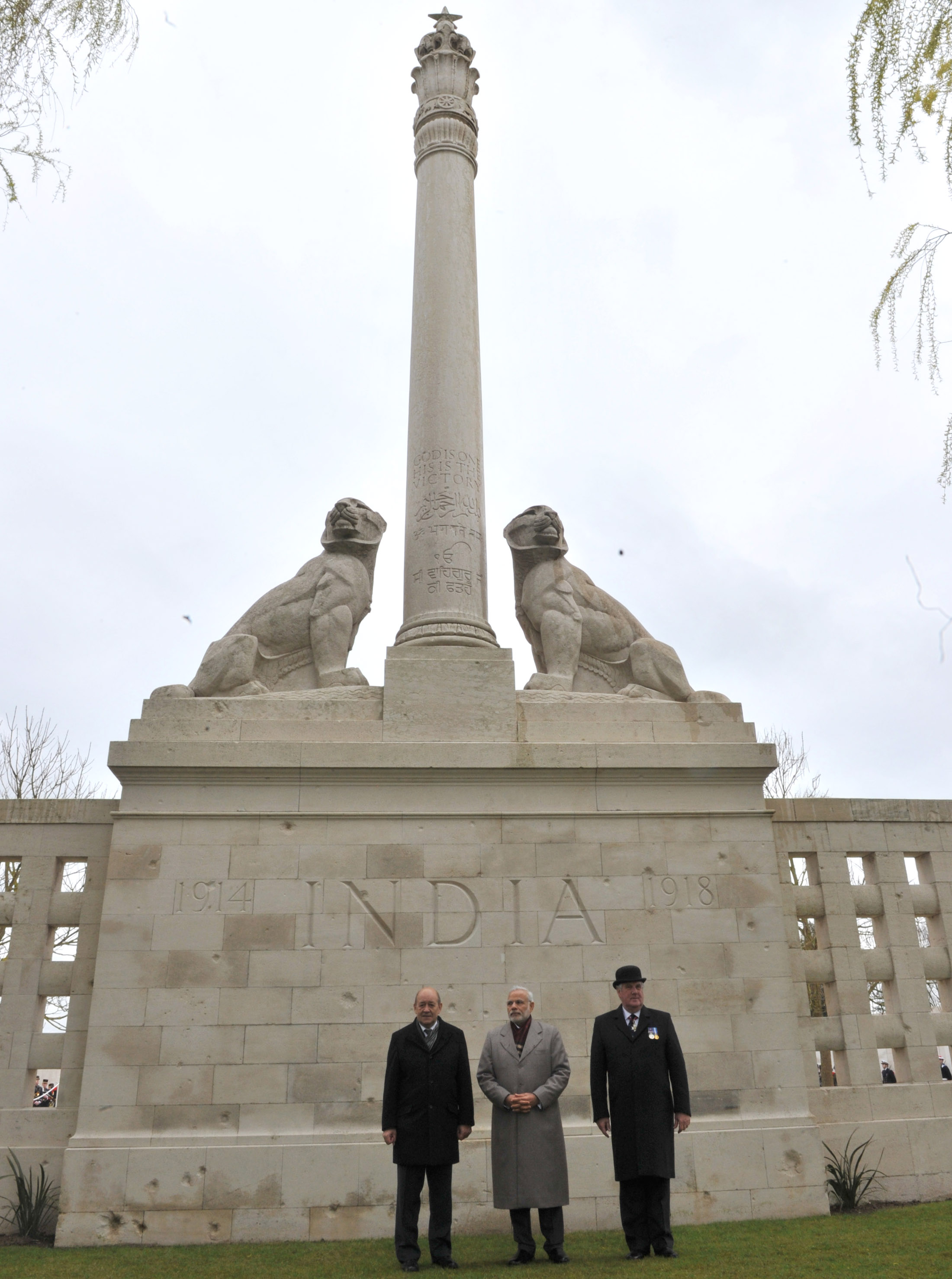
Narendra Modi at Neuve-Chapelle, 2015

The memorial was the site for commemorations during the First World War centenary years, including a visit in April 2015 by the Prime Minister of India Narendra Modi. The Indian national anthem was played, a silence held, and a wreath laid. Modi wrote in the visitor's book:

I am honoured to pay homage to the Indian soldiers here at the Indian Memorial at Neuve Chapelle. Our soldiers who fought in foreign lands in the Great War, have won the admiration of the world for dedication, loyalty, courage and sacrifice. I salute them.

— Prime Minister Narendra Modi, 11 April 2015
