= Festubert =

- Commune
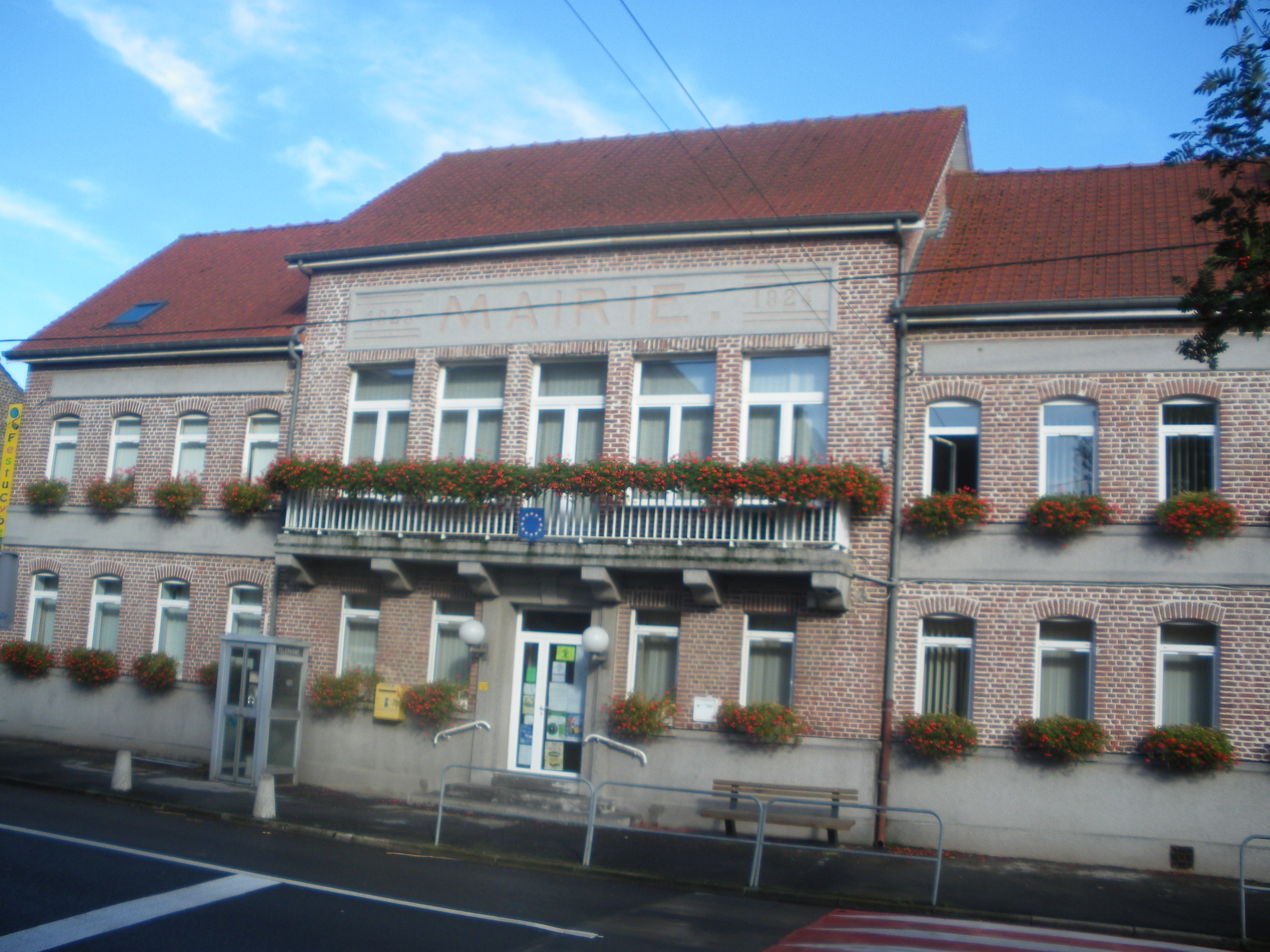
- The town hall of Festubert

- Coat of arms
- Location of Festubert
- Location within France Location within Hauts-de-France
- Coordinates: 50°32′39″N 2°44′15″E
- Country: France
- Region: Hauts-de-France
- Department: Pas-de-Calais
- Arrondissement: Béthune
- Canton: Douvrin
- Intercommunality: CA Béthune-Bruay, Artois-Lys Romane

Government
  - Mayor (2020–2026): Jean-Marie Douvry
- Area^{1}: 7.64 km^{2} (2.95 sq mi)
- Elevation: 20 m (66 ft)
- Highest elevation: 21 m (69 ft)
- Lowest elevation: 18 m (59 ft)
- Population (2023): 1,242
  - Density: 163/km^{2} (421/sq mi)
- Time zone: UTC+01:00 (CET)
  - Summer (DST): UTC+02:00 (CEST)
- INSEE/Postal code: 62330 /62149
- ^{1} French Land Register data, which excludes lakes, ponds, glaciers > 1 km^{2} (0.386 sq mi or 247 acres) and river estuaries.

Festubert (French pronunciation: [fɛstybɛʁ]) is a commune in the Pas-de-Calais department in the Hauts-de-France region of France 21 miles (34 km) southwest of Lille. The village was on the Western Front during the First World War and was largely destroyed in the May 1915 Battle of Festubert.

== Population ==
Historical population
Year	Pop.	±% p.a.
1968	679	—
1975	670	−0.19%
1982	770	+2.01%
1990	1,046	+3.90%
1999	1,120	+0.76%
2007	1,238	+1.26%
2012	1,325	+1.37%
2017	1,313	−0.18%
2023	1,242	−0.92%
Source: INSEE

== See also ==
- Communes of the Pas-de-Calais department
- Defence of Festubert (November 1914)
- Battle of Festubert (May 1915)
- Battle of the Lys (1918) (Festubert was on the southern extremity of this battle)
