= Traverse (trench warfare) =

Development in trench design

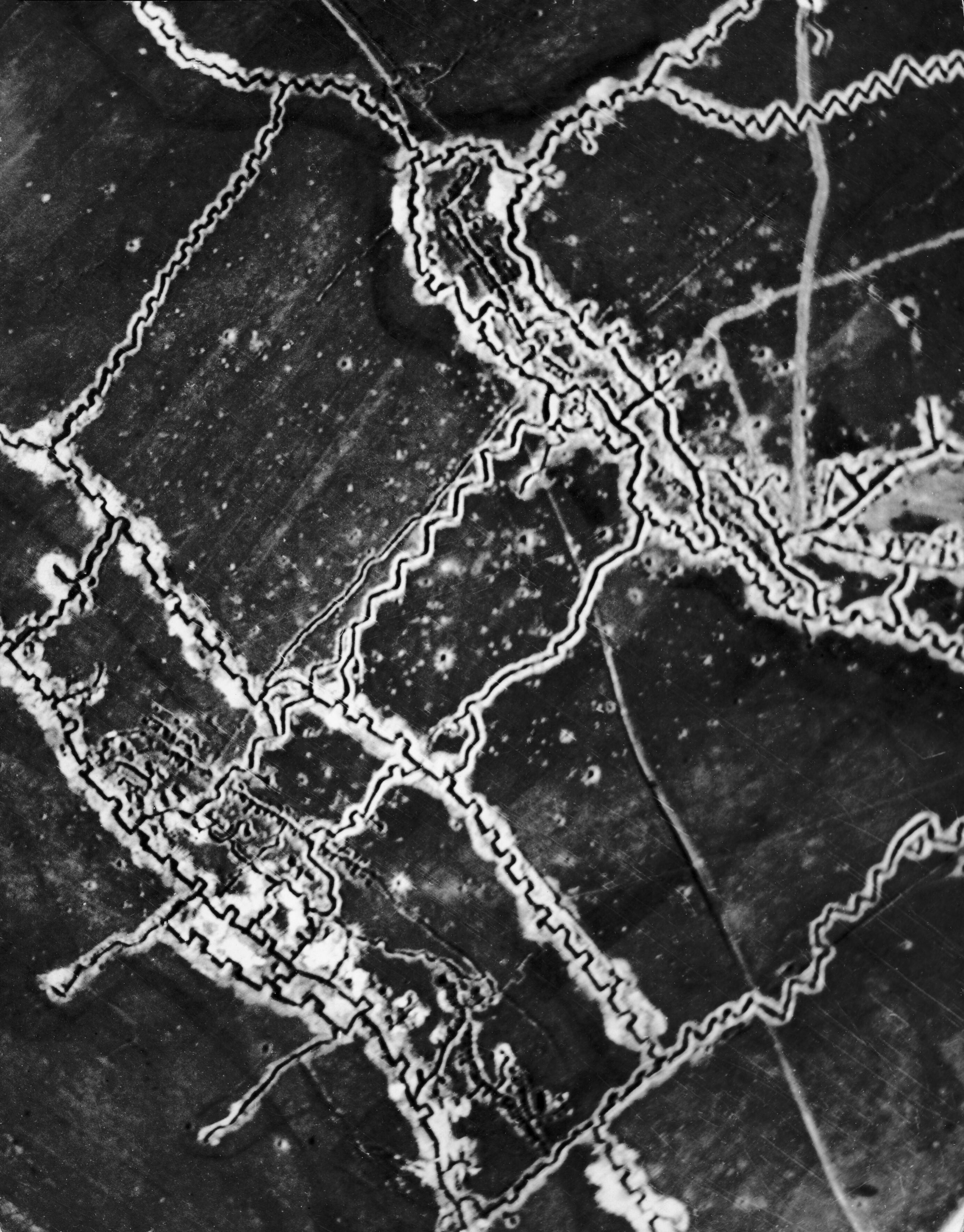
British aerial photograph of German trenches north of Thiepval, France taken during World War I on 10 May 1916; the crenelated appearance of the trenches is due to the presence of traverses

In trench warfare, a traverse is an adaptation to reduce casualties to defenders occupying a trench. One form of traverse is a U-shaped detour in the trench with the trench going around a protrusion formed of earth and sandbags. The fragments or shrapnel, or shockwave from a shell landing and exploding within a trench then cannot spread horizontally past the obstacle the traverse interposes. Also, an enemy that has entered a trench is unable to fire down the length at the defenders, or otherwise enfilade the trench.

A traverse trench is a trench dug perpendicular to a trench line, but extending away from the enemy. It has two functions. One function is to provide an entry into the main trench. A second function is to provide a place for defenders to shelter and regroup should the enemy have penetrated into the main trench and be able to fire down the main trench's length.

On an approach trench, that is, a trench leading from the rear to the frontline or firing trench, defenders may construct an island traverse. With an island traverse, the approach trench splits to go around both sides of a traverse before coming together again.

Lastly, a flying or bridge traverse is a sandbagged covering for a stretch of trench to block shrapnel or shell fragments from entering the trench.
