= Neuve-Chapelle =

Neuve-Chapelle Nieuwkappel
- Commune
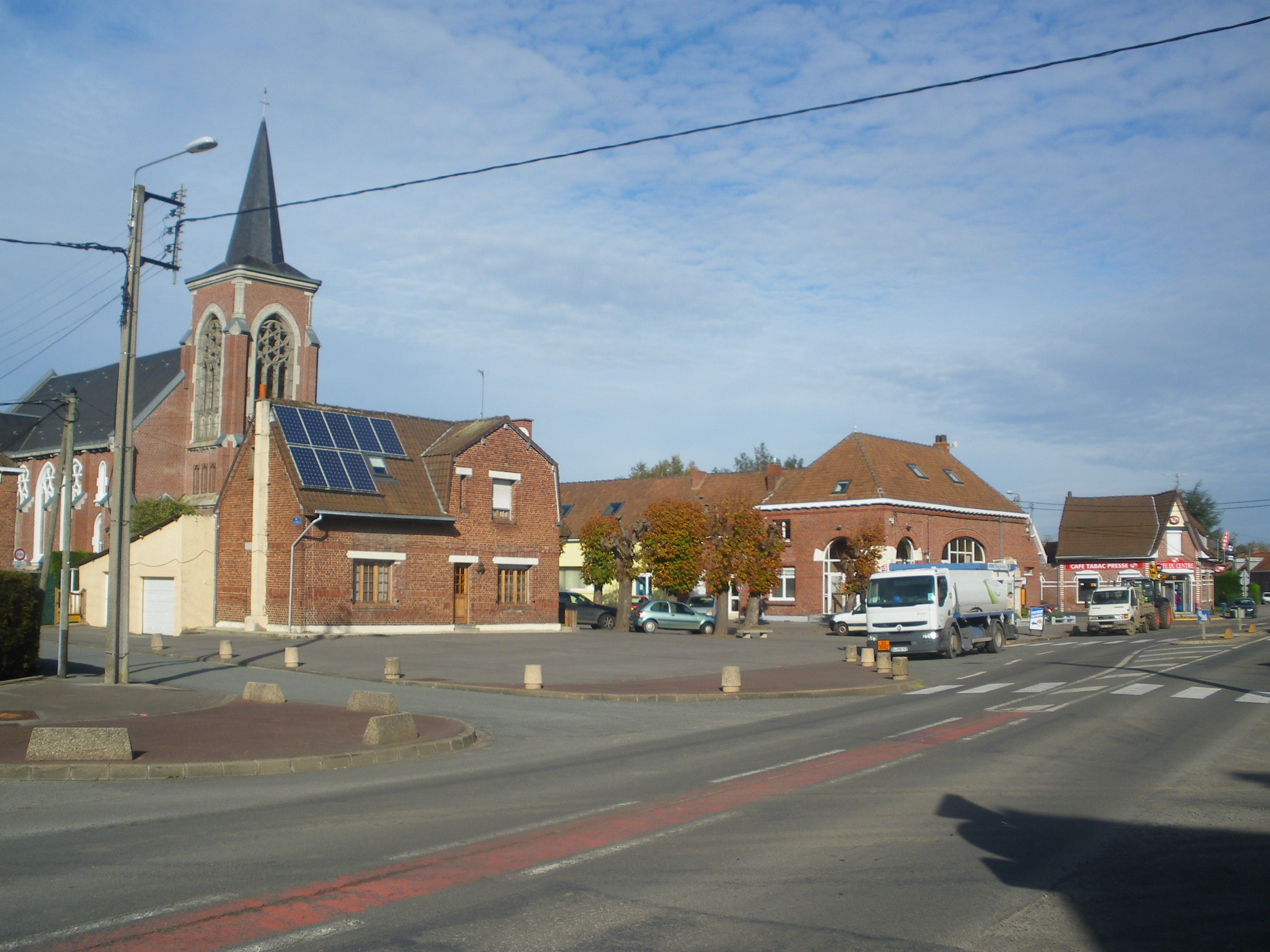
- The centre of Neuve-Chapelle

- Coat of arms
- Location of Neuve-Chapelle
- Location within France Location within Hauts-de-France
- Coordinates: 50°35′04″N 2°46′52″E
- Country: France
- Region: Hauts-de-France
- Department: Pas-de-Calais
- Arrondissement: Béthune
- Canton: Beuvry
- Intercommunality: CA Béthune-Bruay, Artois-Lys Romane

Government
  - Mayor (2020–2026): Tanguy Robiquet
- Area^{1}: 1.86 km^{2} (0.72 sq mi)
- Elevation: 19 m (62 ft)
- Highest elevation: 20 m (66 ft)
- Lowest elevation: 17 m (56 ft)
- Population (2023): 1,409
  - Density: 758/km^{2} (1,960/sq mi)
- Time zone: UTC+01:00 (CET)
  - Summer (DST): UTC+02:00 (CEST)
- INSEE/Postal code: 62606 /62840
- ^{1} French Land Register data, which excludes lakes, ponds, glaciers > 1 km^{2} (0.386 sq mi or 247 acres) and river estuaries.

Neuve-Chapelle (West Flemish: Nieuwkappel) is a commune in the Pas-de-Calais department in the Hauts-de-France region of France It was the site of a World War I battle in 1915 about 8 miles (13 km) northeast of Béthune and 16 miles (26 km) southwest of Lille.

== History ==
In the Battle of Neuve-Chapelle, which began on 10 March 1915, it was captured.by the IV and I Indian Corps.

== Population ==
Historical population
Year	Pop.	±% p.a.
1968	462	—
1975	471	+0.28%
1982	548	+2.19%
1990	864	+5.86%
1999	958	+1.15%
2007	1,373	+4.60%
2012	1,319	−0.80%
2017	1,440	+1.77%
2023	1,409	−0.36%
Source: INSEE

== Places of interest ==
- The Neuve-Chapelle Indian Memorial of the British Indian Army

== See also ==
- Communes of the Pas-de-Calais department
