= 20th Lancers (Pakistan) =

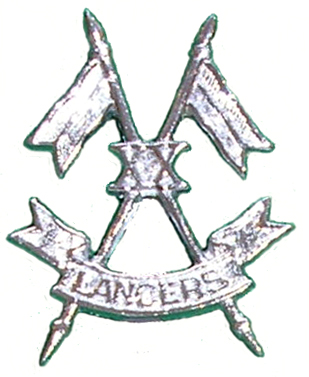
- Active: 1922–1937; 20 June 1956 – Present
- Country: British India; Pakistan
- Branch: British Indian Army; Pakistan Army
- Type: Armoured Regiment
- Size: Regiment
- Nickname: Haideri
- Engagements: Indian Mutiny of 1857; Bhutan War 1864–65; Second Afghan War 1878–80; First World War 1914–18; Indo-Pakistani War of 1965; Indo-Pakistani War of 1971
- Battle honours: Charasiah, Kabul 1879, Afghanistan 1878–80, Neuve Chapelle, France and Flanders 1914–15, Kut al Amara 1917, Sharqat, Mesopotamia 1916–18, Persia 1916–19, NW Frontier, India 1915, Sialkot 1965, Shakargarh 1971.

The 20th Lancers is an armoured regiment in the Armoured Corps of the Pakistan Army. It is considered to be the successor of the old 20th Lancers of the British Indian Army. As part of a reorganization of the British Indian Army, the original 20th Lancers was formed in 1922 by the amalgamation of the 14th Murray's Jat Lancers and the 15th Lancers (Cureton's Multanis).

The modern regiment was formed in 1956 from Pakistan Punjab Regiment. 20 Lancers is also affiliated with Punjab Regiment and sometimes also called as 20 Lancers (Punjab)

== Predecessor ==
After the First World War, the cavalry regiments of the British Indian Army were reduced in number from thirty-nine to twenty-one. Rather than being disbanded, the surplus units were amalgamated in pairs. This resulted in the renumbering and renaming of the entire cavalry line. The 20th Lancers was formed in 1922, after amalgamation of the 14th Murray's Jat Lancers and the 15th Lancers (Cureton's Multanis) on 21 September 1920, at Sialkot.

The 14th Murray's Jat Lancers was originally raised at Aligarh as the Jat Horse Yeomanry in 1857, during the Indian Mutiny, and was composed entirely of Hindu Jats. The 15th Lancers (Cureton's Multanis) was formed at Lahore in 1858 from Multani Pathans, and had originally been raised in 1857 as The Multani Regiment of Cavalry. The new 20th Lancers regiment formed by their amalgamation comprised one squadron each of Punjabi Muslims, Jat Sikhs, and Hindu Jats.

The uniform of the 20th Lancers was dark blue with scarlet facings. Its badge consisted of crossed silver lances bearing pennons, with a crown at the intersection above "XX" and a scroll below. In 1937, the 20th Lancers became the training regiment of the 3rd Indian Cavalry Group at Lucknow. It was converted into a training centre in 1940, and transferred to India after Partition of India and Pakistan.

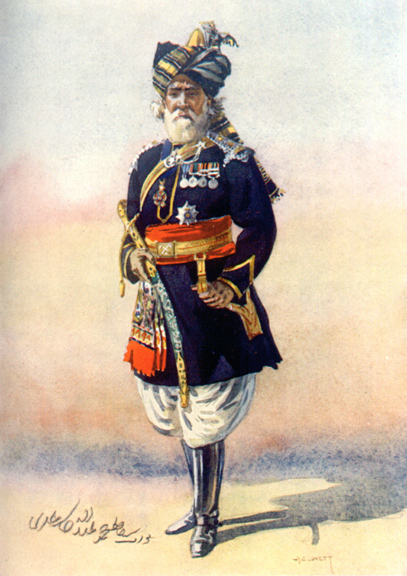
An officer of the 15th Lancers (Cureton's Multanis). Watercolour by AC Lovett, 1910.

== Reformation ==
On 20 June 1956, the 20th Lancers was re-raised by the Pakistan Army as a reconnaissance regiment of the Pakistan Armoured Corps. The regiment was initially issued with M36B2s that were transferred from the Guides Cavalry, and were showing their age. However, in 1959, it was re-equipped with M24 Chaffee light tanks. The same year, the Indian Army also raised an armoured regiment, the 20 Lancers, as the successor of the pre-independence 20th Lancers.

Major Syed Azmat Ali Bokhari was given responsibility for raising the 20th Lancers for the Armoured Corps. Major Bokhari also commanded a squadron of the regiment during the 1965 war against India, serving on the Sialkot front. The regiment's original badge was retained when it was re-raised in 1956, with the exception of the crown.

== Operations ==
During the Indo-Pakistani War of 1965, the regiment, equipped with M36B2 tank destroyers, served under the 15th Infantry Division in the Sialkot Sector. The regiment took part in the defence of the Sialkot Cantonment and Dallowali Railway Station, losing fifteen men. For its role in this action, the regiment was awarded the battle honour "Sialkot 1965".

During the Indo-Pakistani War of 1971, the 20th Lancers was part of the 8th Infantry Division in the Shakargarh-Zafarwal Sector, and formed part of a delaying force tasked with preventing an intrusion of Indian forces between Deg Nadi and River Bein for 48 hours. The regiment held up the invading Indian divisions for two weeks against repeated attacks, with the loss of sixteen men. The 20th Lancers was subsequently awarded the battle honour "Shakargarh 1971". Sowar Muhammad Hussain was awarded a posthumous Nishan-i-Haider for outstanding gallantry, the only occasion on which this award was won by the Armoured Corps.

== Affiliations & Alliances ==
(Pakistan) The Punjab Regiment

In 1990, the 20th Lancers was given permission to add the suffix Haidri to its title. It was also affiliated with the Punjab Regiment, as a mark of recognition of the battlefield camaraderie between the 13th Battalion, Punjab Regiment and the 20th Lancers in Shakargarh in 1971. The 20th Lancers now bears the extended title of 20th Lancers (Haidri) (Punjab).
