= 4th Cavalry (Pakistan) =

- char risale
- Founded: 1 November 1956
- Country: Pakistan
- Branch: Pakistan Army
- Role: Armoured
- Size: Regiment
- Part of: Pakistan Armoured Corps
- Regimental centre: Nowshera, Khyber Pakhtunkhwa
- Nicknames: The Valiant Fourth; The Valiants
- Motto: VALOUR IS NOT SUBSERVIENT TO TIME
- Colours: green, white & black
- Anniversaries: 01 NOVEMBER
- Battle honours: Asal Uttar

The 4th Cavalry is an armoured regiment of the Pakistan Army. It was previously a regular cavalry regiment of the British Indian Army.The regiment was raised again after partition on 01 November 1956 . The regiment has the honour of fighting both battles of 1965 and 1971 in enemery territory. The regiment suffered heavy losses as part of the 1st Armoured Division in the Battle of Asal Uttar during the Indo-Pakistani War of 1965.The regiment is famous for its old history and war achievements.The regiment plays a vital and pivotal role In Pakistan Armoured corp as it has the honour of being the first regiment that was raised by the Pakistan army itself post partition. The slogan of regiment is “VALOUR IS NOT SUBSERVIENT TO TIME” Which were the words of the first commanding officer of the regiment Lt Col Muhammad Nawaz Khan. The regiment has many battle honours and is highly decorated.

Originally called the 4th Risala, the unit’s name was later changed to 4th Cavalry to align with the standard cavalry and lancer designations. Raised in 1956 at Nowshera by Muhammad Nawaz Khan, renowned for his role in the Kashmir War, its badge was designed by Sikander (Sikku) Khan. The regiment began with outdated Sherman Mark V and III tanks brought out of storage. Over the next five years, while rotating between Nowshera, Peshawar, and Mansar Camp, it was rearmed with two squadrons of the newer Sherman M4A1s and one squadron of M36B2s. Eventually, the unit transitioned to M47 tanks and became part of the 1st Armoured Division at Kharian. Currently, the unit is equipped with T-80UD tanks.

== Battles ==
- Battle of Asal Uttar, Indo-Pakistani War of 1965

== See also ==
- 4th Cavalry (India), a former regiment of the British Indian Army
- 4th Horse (Hodson's Horse), an armoured regiment of the Indian Army
