= 15th Lancers =

Pakistan Army unit

15th Lancers (Baloch)
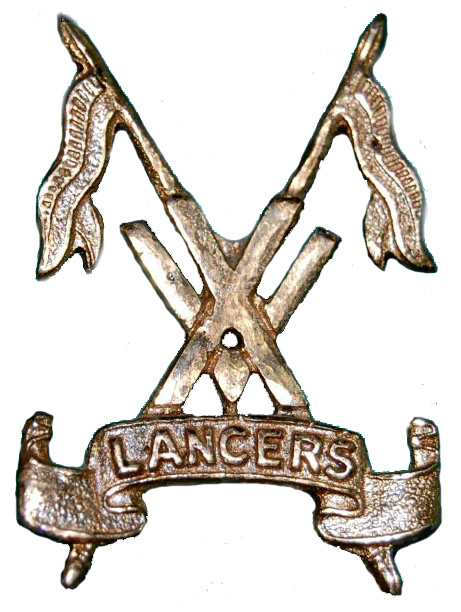
- Active: 1922 - 1937; 15 January 1955 - Present
- Country: (British Raj) British India; Pakistan
- Branch: British Indian Army; Pakistan Army
- Type: Armoured Regiment
- Nickname: Baluch Horse
- Uniform: Dark blue; faced buff
- Engagements: Bhutan War 1864-65; Second Afghan War 1878-80; First World War 1914-18; Third Afghan War 1919; Indo-Pakistani War of 1965
- Battle honours: Afghanistan 1879-80, Afghanistan 1919, Khem Karan 1965.

The 15th Lancers (Baloch) is an armoured regiment of the Pakistan Army. It was formed in 1922 by the amalgamation of the 17th Cavalry and the 37th Lancers (Baluch Horse).

== Predecessor regiments ==
=== 17th Cavalry ===
The 17th Cavalry was raised in 1857 at Muttra by Colonel CJ Robarts and was composed entirely of Afghans. Throughout its existence, the regiment remained an exclusively Muslim unit. In 1861, after several changes in nomenclature, it was designated the 17th Regiment of Bengal Cavalry. In 1865, it saw action as part of the Bhutan Field Force, while in 1879–80, the regiment operated on lines of communication during the Second Afghan War as part of the Kabul Field Force. During the First World War, it dispatched a squadron to Africa where it took part in the East African Campaign. In 1919, the regiment fought in the Third Afghan War. The regiment maintained a mounted pipe band from 1895 to 1902. The uniform of the 17th Cavalry was blue with white facings. The regimental badge consisted of a silver star and crescent over "XVII" with a title scroll below.

- 1857 Muttra Horse
- 1857 Muttra Police Corps
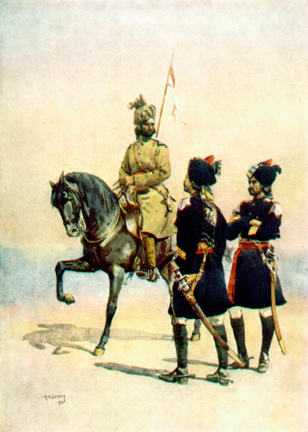
  37th Lancers (Baluch Horse) (left). Watercolour by Maj AC Lovett, 1910.
- 1858 Rohilkhand Auxiliary Police Levy
- 1859 Robarts’ Horse
- 1861 17th Regiment of Bengal Cavalry
- 1882 Disbanded
- 1885 Re-raised
- 1900 17th Regiment of Bengal Lancers
- 1901 17th Bengal Lancers
- 1903 17th Cavalry

=== 37th Lancers (Baluch Horse) ===
The 37th Lancers (Baluch Horse) was raised in 1885 as the 7th Bombay Cavalry (Jacob-ka-Risallah) from the manpower of the 3rd Scinde Horse (Belooch Horse), which had been disbanded in 1882. This regiment was also an all-Muslim unit made up of Pathans and Baluchis. Their first chance of active service came in 1919, when they served in the Third Afghan War, although one of their squadrons operated in Persia during the First World War. Prior to 1914 the regiment's dress uniform was dark blue (khaki drill for hot-weather parade and field dress), with buff facings. The badge consisted of crossed lances and pennons with "37" over crossed lances.

- 1885 7th Bombay Cavalry (Jacob-ka-Risallah)
- 1886 7th Bombay Cavalry (Belooch Horse)
- 1890 7th Bombay Lancers (Belooch Horse)
- 1903 37th Lancers (Baluch Horse)

== 15th Lancers ==
After the First World War, the number of Indian cavalry regiments was reduced from thirty-nine to twenty-one. However, instead of disbanding the surplus units, it was decided to amalgamate them in pairs. This resulted in renumbering and renaming of the entire cavalry line. The 17th Cavalry and 37th Lancers (Baluch Horse) were amalgamated at Lucknow in 1922 to form the 15th Lancers. Meanwhile, an existing 15th Lancers (Cureton's Multanis) joined the 14th Murray's Jat Lancers to form the 20th Lancers.

The uniform of the new 15th Lancers was dark blue with buff facings, while the badge consisted of crossed silver lances bearing pennons with "XV" at the crossing and a scroll below. The same uniform and badges are still in use by the regiment.

In 1937, the 15th Lancers became the training regiment of the 1st Indian Cavalry Group. It was converted into a training centre in 1940 by amalgamating it with the 12th Cavalry (Frontier Force). However, the next year, the centre was disbanded. In 1955, the 15th Lancers was re-raised by the Pakistani Army as a Reconnaissance Regiment of the Pakistan Armoured Corps and equipped with M24 Chaffee light tanks. During the Indo-Pakistani War of 1965, the regiment served with distinction in the Kasur Sector and was awarded the Battle Honour 'Khem Karan 1965.' In 1969, the 15th Lancers was affiliated with the Baluch Regiment (now called the Baloch Regiment) due to the old link with the 37th Lancers (Baluch Horse). It added the title of 'Baluch' to its designation in 1989.

- 1922 17th/37th Cavalry (amalgamation of 17th Cavalry and 37th Lancers)
- 1922 15th Lancers
- 1940 1st Indian Armoured Corps Centre (amalgamation of 15th Lancers and 12th Cavalry)
- 1941 Disbanded
- 1955 15th Lancers (re-raised)
- 1989 15th Lancers (Baluch)
- 1991 15th Lancers (Baloch)

== Affiliations and alliances ==
- (Pakistan) The Baloch Regiment
- (United Kingdom) The Royal Dragoon Guards
