= Derajat Brigade =

The Derajat Brigade was formed after the 1903 reforms of the British Indian Army by Herbert Kitchener when he was Commander-in-Chief, India. The brigade was part of the Northern Army and deployed along the North West Frontier. The Derajat Brigade had its winter headquarters at Dera Ismail Khan, and the garrison consisted of a mountain battery, an Indian Army cavalry regiment and three Indian Army infantry regiments. Detachments from these regiments helped to garrison the outposts of Drazinda, Jandola, and Jatta.

In August 1914, at the start of World War I, the brigade formation was:

- Commander Major General George Younghusband.
  - 35th Scinde Horse
  - 18th Infantry
  - 27th Punjabis
  - 45th Rattray's Sikhs
  - 57th Wilde's Rifles (Frontier Force)
  - 32nd Mountain Battery

Major General George Younghusband was shortly afterwards (October 1914) succeeded by Brigadier-General Francis John Fowler. In February 1916 he was in turn succeeded by Brigadier-General Guy Melfort Baldwin who left to command the 10th Indian Cavalry Brigade in May 1917. In June 1918 Major General N. G. Woodyatt was appointed to command the brigade.

== Bibliography ==
- Sumner, Ian (2001). The Indian Army 1914-1947. Osprey Publishing. ISBN 1-84176-196-6.
