= 10th Indian Cavalry Brigade =

- Active: May 1917 –
- Country: British India
- Allegiance: British Crown
- Branch: British Indian Army
- Type: Cavalry
- Size: Brigade
- Part of: 1st (Peshawar) Division
- Service: First World War

Commanders
- Notable commanders: Br.-Gen. G.M. Baldwin

The 10th Indian Cavalry Brigade was a cavalry brigade of the British Indian Army that formed part of the Indian Army during the First World War. It remained in India throughout the war.

== History ==
The Headquarters 10th Indian Cavalry Brigade was formed under 1st (Peshawar) Division in May 1917, presumably to command some of the units assigned to the 1st (Risalpur) Cavalry Brigade at this time. (Note: Units assigned to the 1st (Risalpur) Cavalry Brigade from May 1917 included: 21st (Empress of India's) Lancers; 1st Duke of York's Own Lancers (Skinner's Horse); Guides Cavalry; 30th Lancers (Gordon's Horse); 5th Cavalry; two squadrons, 17th Cavalry; 33rd Queen Victoria's Own Light Cavalry; 4th Cavalry; M Battery, RHA; 1st Battalion, Guides Infantry; 2nd Battalion, Guides Infantry; 55th Coke's Rifles (Frontier Force); 54th Sikhs (Frontier Force); 3rd Battalion, Guides Infantry; 1st (King's) Dragoon Guards; 22nd Machine Gun Squadron; 1st Field Troop, 1st King George's Own Sappers and Miners) In the event, only the 30th Lancers (Gordon's Horse) was assigned to the brigade, from December 1917 to July 1918. The brigade remained with the division throughout the First World War.

Under mobilization plans drawn up in July 1918, IV Corps with 1st (Peshawar) Division under command would have included 1st and 10th Cavalry brigades with:

- 4th Cavalry
- 30th Lancers (Gordon's Horse)
- 3rd Gwalior Lancers (I.S.)
- 24th Machine Gun Squadron
- 4th Field Troop, 3rd Bombay Sappers and Miners

== Commander ==
The brigade was commanded from 10 May 1917 by Brigadier-General G.M. Baldwin.

== See also ==
- 10th Cavalry Brigade (British Indian Army) existed at the same time but was unrelated other than having the same number

== Bibliography ==
- Perry, F.W. (1993). Order of Battle of Divisions Part 5B. Indian Army Divisions. Newport: Ray Westlake Military Books. ISBN 1-871167-23-X.
