= General Baldwin =

General Baldwin may refer to:

- Charles C. Baldwin (born 1947), U.S. Air Force major general
- Frank Baldwin (1842–1923), U.S. Army major general
- Guy Melfort Baldwin (1865–1945), British Indian Army brigadier general
- James L. Baldwin (1921–1979), U.S. Army major general
- Theodore Anderson Baldwin (1839–1925), U.S. Army brigadier general
- William Edwin Baldwin (1827–1864), Confederate States Army brigadier general
