= Muhammad Hussain (soldier) =

Gallantry Legend War Hero of Pakistan

Sowar Muhammad Hussain Janjua NH
- محمد حسین جنجوعہ
- Born: 18 June 1949; Dhok Pir Bakhsh, Rawalpindi District, West Punjab, Dominion of Pakistan
- Died: 10 December 1971 (aged 22); Harar Khurd, Shakargarh, Narowal District, Punjab, Pakistan
- Burial place: Rawalpindi District, Punjab, Pakistan
- Spouse: Arzan Bibi (m. 1967)
- Children: 2, including Munawar Hussain
- Military career
- Allegiance: Pakistan
- Branch: Pakistan Army
- Service years: 1966–1971
- Rank: Sowar
- Service number: 1028148
- Unit: 20 Lancers
- Conflicts: Indo-Pakistani War of 1971 †
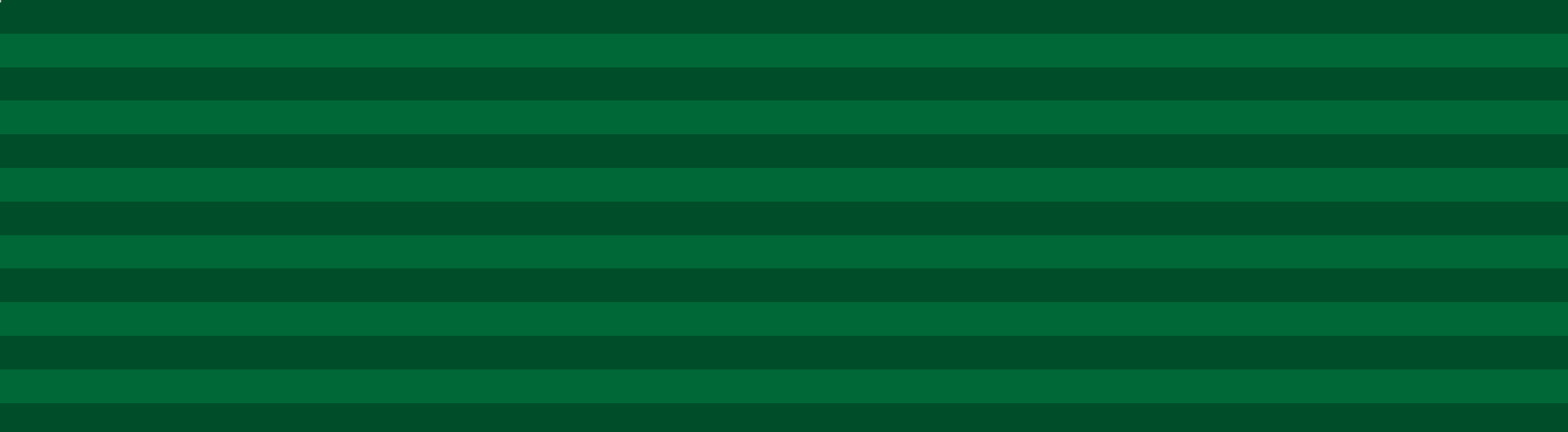
- Awards: Nishan-e-Haider
- Memorials: Dhok Pir Bakhsh village renamed to Dhok Muhammad Husain Janjua; Sawar Muhamad Hussain Shaheed (N.H) Boys Hostel
- Website: https://pakistanarmy.gov.pk/Sowar-Mohammad-Hussain.php

Sowar Muhammad Hussain Janjua NH, (Punjabi, Urdu: سوار محمد حسین جنجوعہ; 18 June 1949 – 10 December 1971) was a Pakistani soldier and the 8th recipient of Pakistan's highest military award, the Nishan-e-Haider (Mark of the Lion), and the only soldier of the Pakistan Armoured Corps to be given this award.

He is known for helping his Pakistan Army unit destroy 16 tanks with recoilless rifle attacks in the Indo-Pakistan War of 1971.

== Early life ==
Mihammad Hussain was born on 18 June 1949 in the village of Dhok Pir Bakhsh, Rawalpindi District into a Janjua Rajput family on 18 June 1949 to Roz Ali, a farmer.

== Personal life ==
Hussain was married to Arzan Bibi and had two children. At the time of his death, his daughter was a little over two years old and his son Munawar Hussain, was three months old. Sowar Hussain did not have a chance to see his son due to not getting leave and Hussain died before his son's birth.

== Military career ==
He enlisted into the Pakistan Armoured Corps as a Driver on 3 September 1966 at the age of 17 and later joined the 20th Lancers on 23 May 1967.

Although he had a rank of a Driver in the Armoured Corps. Sowar is a low rank in the Pakistan Armoured Corps, equivalent to a Sepoy. He would take part in every battle his unit got engaged in during the Indo-Pakistani war of 1971. He was assigned his military duties on the frontlines in what was then called West Pakistan. On 5 December 1971, in the Zafarwal-Shakargarh area of Punjab, Pakistan, he crawled from trench to trench under heavy enemy fire to deliver ammunition, and he skillfully evaded all enemy attacks for some time.

== Death ==
On 10 December 1971, he took part in a dangerous mission and went out for reconnaissance and to fight enemy patrols. During reconnaissance, near the village Harar Khurd, he spotted enemy tanks and on his own initiative, directed a recoil-less rifle crew towards the enemy and destroyed 16 enemy tanks. He was hit in the chest by a burst of machine-gun fire and killed while directing fire from recoilless rifles. After his death, his father proudly said, "My son received bullets on his chest like a lion".

Naib Risaldar Ali Nawab and Lance daffadar Abdur Rehman picked up his body from the battlefield.

=== Burial ===
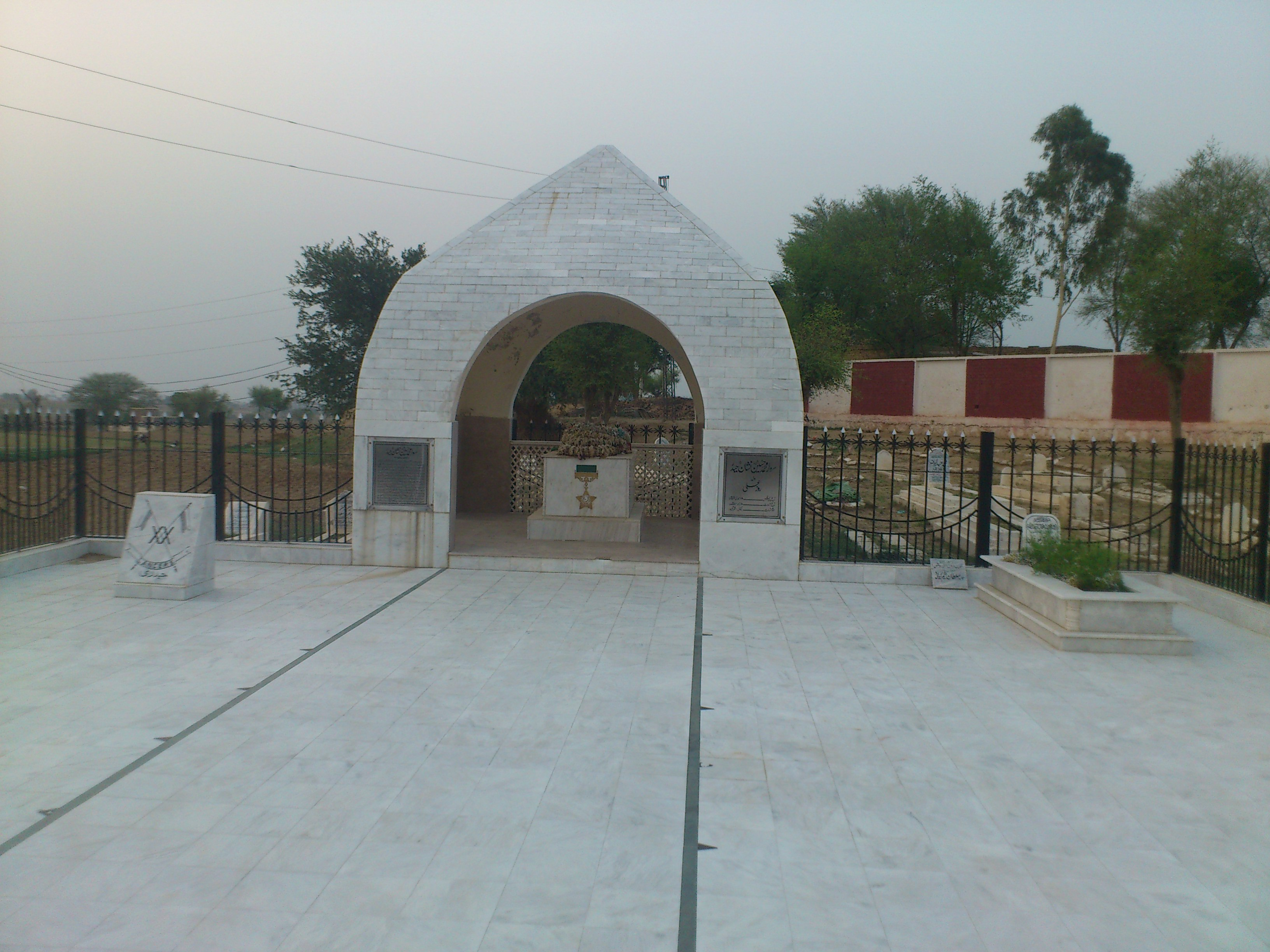
The tomb of Hussain Janjua

Hussain was buried in a makeshift military graveyard in Shakargarh but his body was later excavated and buried in his native village of Dhok Pir Bakhsh.

=== Memorials ===
After Sawar Hussain's death, his village Dhok Pir Bakhsh was renamed Dhok Muhammad Hussain to commemorate his sacrifice. It is also referred to as Dhok Nishan-e-Haider due to Hussain being a receiver of the award.

Sawar Muhamad Hussain Shaheed (N.H) Boys Hostel was established in October 1992 to give free education to male children of Shaheed, deceased, war wounded and retired/serving junior commissioned officers and soldiers of the Pakistan Armoured Corps who were appointed on merit. When the school was established, the number of students was 40 and rose to 82. Students from year six to intermediate are eligible for admission into the hostel. All expenses such as boarding, lodging, medical treatment, books, stationery, school and extra coaching fee are paid by the Armoured Corps Centre.

== Awards and decorations ==
Nishan-e-Haider (NH)
