= 20 Lancers (India) =

Indian Army regiment

20th Lancers
- Active: 1857–1937, 1956–present
- Country: British India; India
- Branch: British Indian Army; Indian Army
- Type: Armour
- Size: Regiment
- Equipment: T-72
- Engagements: Indo-Pakistani War of 1965; Indo-Pakistani War of 1971; Battle of Longewala

Commanders
- Colonel of the Regiment: Lieutenant General Devendra Sharma
- Notable commanders: General Shankar Roy Chowdhury, PVSM, ADC; Lt Gen Gurbachan Singh (Buch) PVSM; Lt Gen Pradeep Khanna, PVSM, AVSM, ADC

Insignia
- Abbreviation: 20 L

20th Lancers is an armoured regiment in the Armoured Corps of the Indian Army. The regiment distinguished itself in operations with its defence of Chhamb in Jammu and Kashmir during the 1965 Indo-Pakistan War and won one Maha Vir Chakra. It has provided one Chief of Army Staff and two Army Commanders.

== History ==
The 20th Lancers regiment of the British Indian Army was formed in 1921 by 14th Murray's Jat Lancers (raised 1857) with 15th Lancers (Cureton's Multanis) (raised 1858). This regiment was de-activated in 1937 and converted into a training regiment of the 3rd Indian Cavalry group with a permanent station in Lucknow which would eventually evolve into the Indian Armoured Corps Training Centre.

Following the Partition of India in 1947, the training regiment was allotted to India. The Lucknow training centre moved in 1948 to Ahmednagar and merged with other establishments to become the Armoured Corps Centre and School.

On 20 June 1956, the Pakistan Army raised its own 20th Lancers regiment as a successor unit to the 20th Lancers of the British Indian Army. On 10 July 1956, the Indian Army also re-raised the 20th Lancers at Jodhpur in Rajasthan. The unit's first commanding officer was Lieutenant Colonel Umrao Singh. and was equipped with AMX-13 tanks. When the regiment was re-raised, the Officer's Mess Silver of the old 20th Lancers was handed over to it.

The troops on raising were from the Sikhs of the 6th DCO Lancers which were transferred to 8th Light Cavalry and half of the squadron of the Jodhpur Lancers which were transferred to the 7th Light Cavalry. The present class composition is Jats and Rajputs.

== Regimental Insignia ==
The Regimental insignia consists of crossed lances with pennons in red and white, overlaid with the Ashoka Lion Capital above and the Roman numeral "XX" below and a scroll at the base with the words ‘Lancers’.

== Operations ==
=== Sino-Indian War ===
To counter the Chinese offensive against Indian forces in the western sector, the Indian Army sent six AMX-13 tanks (two troops) of the 20 Lancers to Chushul in south-eastern Ladakh using Antonov An-12 transport aircraft. The first batch of tanks were loaded on to An-12 aircraft in Chandigarh on the intervening night of 24 and 25 October 1962 and landed in Chushul — 15,000 feet above the sea level — on the morning of 25 October 1962. The second batch was loaded the following night and airlifted to Chushul on 26 October. The troops were part of the 114 Infantry Brigade.

The army deployed tanks at the base of Gurung Hill, a towering feature on one side of the Spanggur Gap to deny the approach of the advancing Chinese Army and secure the crucial approaches leading to Chushul and Leh. The effectiveness of the Indian tanks prevented the Chinese advance towards the Chushul airfield, located between Chushul village and Gurung Hill.

=== Indo-Pakistani War of 1965 ===
The regiment saw action in Chhamb-Jourian in Jammu & Kashmir. 20 Lancers was under command of the 10th Infantry Division during the 1965 operations. Pakistan's surprise attack on 1 September, 1965 fell on 191 Infantry Brigade, which was supported by 'C' Squadron of the regiment under Maj Bhaskar Roy. The armoured attack comprised two regiments of medium tanks, M-48 Pattons and M-36 Sherman B-2 tank destroyers. The attack began at 0805 hours and was strongly resisted. During the initial phases of the attack, Roy destroyed 6 Pattons, 3 recoil-less guns and captured a jeep. A second attack was launched by Pakistani armour at 1100 hours and contested by the AMX-13s of 20 Lancers, which despite being outgunned and outnumbered, destroyed a total 13 tanks that day and prevented the encirclement of 191 Infantry Brigade. The regiment later fought in the defence of Jaurian under 41 Infantry Brigade. For the defense of Chhamb-Jaurian, the regiment was awarded a theatre honour and Maj Bhaskar Roy was awarded Maha Vir Chakra for his leadership in this action.

=== Indo-Pakistani War of 1971 ===
The regiment had moved from Akhnoor to Jaisalmer in 1967. It was commanded by Lieutenant Colonel Bawa Guruvachan Singh and was under 12 Infantry Division of Southern Command and equipped with AMX -13 tanks. The regiment took part in the Battle of Longewala, which began on night of 4th December 1971, halting the Pakistani attack and then advanced into Pakistani territory.

== Battle honours ==
The battle honours of the regiment are:

Pre-World War I (Note: Pre-World War I and World War I battle honours awarded to the 14th Murray's Jat Lancers and 15th Lancers (Cureton's Multanis) and inherited by the unit.)

Charasiah — Kabul 1879 — Afghanistan 1878-80

World War I

Neuve Chapelle — France and Flanders 1914-15 — Kut al Amara 1917 — Sharqat - Mesopotamia 1916-18 - Persia 1916-19 - NW Frontier India - 1915

Indo-Pak Conflict 1965 (Note: Awarded to the regiment after re-raising.) (Note: Theatre honours are shown in italics.)

Jammu and Kashmir 1965

== Other awards and honours ==
President's Standards

The regiment was presented the President's Standards on at Sangrur, Punjab 1978 by the then President of India, Neelam Sanjiva Reddy.

Maha Vir Chakra
Major Bhaskar Roy
Vir Chakra
Captain Ashwani Kumar Dewan, Daffedar Harbir Singh (Note: Troop Daffedar of 20 Lancers AMX troop of 80 Armoured Delivery Regiment.)
Sena Medal
Acting Lance Daffadar Pritam Singh, Naib Risaldar Richhapal Singh
Mentioned in dispatches
Lieutenant Kuldeep Singh, Lance Daffadar Bhanwar Singh, Sowar Kushal Singh, Sowar Mohan Singh
Republic Day parade
The regiment with its T-72 tanks took part in the parade in 1990.

== Notable personnel ==
- Lieutenant General Gurbachan Singh, PVSM – Commanding Officer during the 1962 war, GOC-in-C Northern Command between 1 August 1978 and 31 December 1979.
- Major General A K Dewan, AVSM, VrC
- General Shankar Roychowdhury, PVSM, ADC - Commanding Officer of the Regiment between 1974-1976, GOC-in-C, Army Training Command, Chief of Army Staff of the Indian Army, and a former member of the Indian Parliament.
- Lieutenant General Pradeep Khanna PVSM, AVSM, ADC - GOC-in-C Southern Command
