= Second Battle of Charasiab =

1880 battle of the Second Anglo-Afghan War

Second battle of Charasiab
- Part of the Second Anglo-Afghan War
Date	25 April 1880
Location	Charasiab, Afghanistan 34°23′55″N 69°10′3″E
Result	British Victory

Belligerents
British Empire	Afghans

Commanders and leaders
(British Empire) Herbert Macpherson VC (British Empire) Colonel Jenkins	Unknown

Strength
Unknown	c. 4,000

Casualties and losses
4 killed, 34 wounded	c. 100–200 killed

The Second Battle of Charasiab was fought on 25 April 1880 between the United Kingdom and Afghan tribesmen, during the Second Anglo-Afghan War.

== Background ==
Charasiab is a small town 12 kilometres (7.5 mi) south of Kabul. In April 1880 a 1,200 strong force under Colonel Jenkins, including a half-battalion of the 92nd Highlanders, was sent from Kabul to Charasiab, to protect a supply column sent there to meet Lieutenant-General Stewart's division travelling from Kandahar to Kabul.

== Battle ==
On the evening of the 24 April, Jenkins saw that his Charasiab position was about to be attacked by a large force of Logar tribesmen. In response, an additional force under Brigadier-General Macpherson was sent from Kabul, consisting of six guns, a troop of the 3rd Punjab Cavalry and 962 Infantry, while Brigadier-General Hugh Gough, with four guns and a cavalry brigade, took up a position half-way between Kabul and Charasiab.

On the morning of the 25 April, Colonel Jenkins' force was surrounded by attacking tribesmen – around 4,000 by British estimates – kept at bay by steady fire. At 1:00 p.m. Macpherson’s force arrived and immediately attacked the Afghans who were routed, and then pursued by the cavalry and horse artillery for four miles. The battle was over by 4:00 p.m.

== Order of battle ==
Units present included:

- 9th Lancers (1 squadron)
- 92nd Highlanders (half-battalion)
- 3rd Punjab Cavalry (one troop)
- 2nd Gurkhas (1 company)

== See also ==
- Battle of Charasiab, 6 October 1879
