= William Vousden =

Recipient of the Victoria Cross

William Vousden VC, CB
- Born: 20 September 1848; Perth, Scotland
- Died: 12 November 1902 (aged 54); Lahore, British India
- Burial place: Lahore Cemetery, Pakistan
- Military career
- Allegiance: United Kingdom
- Branch: British Indian Army
- Service years: 1864 – 1902
- Rank: Major General
- Units: Bengal Staff Corps; Indian Staff Corps
- Commands: Inspector-General of Cavalry in India
- Conflicts: Second Anglo-Afghan War; Tirah Campaign
- Awards: Victoria Cross; Order of the Bath

Major-General William John Vousden, VC, CB (20 September 1848 – 12 November 1902) was a Scottish officer in the Indian Army, and recipient of the Victoria Cross, the highest and most prestigious award for gallantry in the face of the enemy that can be awarded to British and Commonwealth forces.

== Military career ==
Vousden was born in Perth, Scotland the son of Captain Vousden, and was educated at Kings School Canterbury.

He trained at the Royal Military College, Sandhurst, and was commissioned into the 35th (Royal Sussex) Regiment of Foot in 1864. Promoted to lieutenant in 1867, and to captain in 1876, he transferred to the 5th Punjab Cavalry where he served in the Jowaki Expedition 1877–78.

=== Victoria cross ===
He was 34 years old, and a captain in the 5th Punjab Cavalry, during the Second Anglo-Afghan War when the following deed took place on 14 December 1879 on the Koh Asmai Heights, near Kabul, Afghanistan, for which he was awarded the Victoria Cross:

For the exceptional gallantry displayed by him on the 14th December, 1879, on the Koh Asmai Heights, near Kabul, in charging, with a small party, into the centre of the line of the retreating Kohistani force, by whom they were greatly outnumbered, and who did their utmost to close round them. After rapidly charging through and through the enemy, backwards and forwards, several times, they swept off round the opposite side of the village and joined the rest of the Troop.

=== Further military service ===
He continued to serve in the 5th Punjab Cavalry, was promoted to major in 1884, and took part in further fighting on the North-West Frontier region, for which he was mentioned in despatches on 8 June 1891 and 26 January 1898. He was promoted to the brevet rank of colonel in July 1894 and the substantive rank of Colonel of the Indian Staff Corps in January 1899. He was appointed a Companion of the Order of the Bath (CB) in 1900.

In April 1901 he took a command in the Punjab Frontier Force with the temporary rank of brigadier-general, and shortly thereafter he was granted the local rank of major general.

He was appointed to act as Inspector General of Cavalry in India from October 1901, in the absence in South Africa of Colonel Edward Locke Elliot, and received the temporary rank of major general while officiating as such. Following the end of the war in South Africa, Elliott returned in late 1902, and Vousden stepped down.

He retired from the army on 1 November 1902, and died in India of dysentery only two weeks later, on 12 November 1902 at the age of 54.

== Family ==
Vousden married, in 1891, a daughter of Major-General Drummond.
