= 12th Cavalry (Frontier Force) =

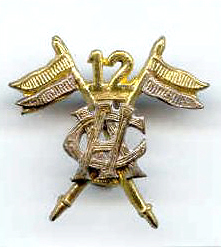
- Active: 1849 – 1937; 15 January 1955 – Present
- Country: (British Raj) British India; Pakistan
- Branch: British Indian Army; Pakistan Army
- Type: Armoured Regiment
- Nickname: Sam Browne's Cavalry
- Engagements: North West Frontier of India; Indian Mutiny of 1857; Second Afghan War 1878–80; First World War 1914–18; Third Afghan War 1919; Indo-Pakistani War of 1965; Indo-Pakistani War of 1971
- Battle honours: Delhi 1857, Lucknow, Charasiah, Kabul 1879, Ahmad Khel, Afghanistan 1878–80, Kut al Amara 1917, Baghdad, Mesopotamia 1916–18, North West Frontier, India 1914–15, East Africa 1917, Afghanistan 1919, Khem Karan 1965.

Commanders
- Notable commanders: Sam Browne; Dighton Probyn; William Vousden; Guy Melfort Baldwin

The 12th Cavalry Sam Browne's Cavalry (Frontier Force) is an armoured regiment of Pakistan Army. It was formed in the British Indian army in 1922 by the amalgamation of 22nd Sam Browne's Cavalry (Frontier Force) and 25th Cavalry (Frontier Force).

== 22nd Sam Browne's Cavalry (Frontier Force) ==
The 22nd Sam Browne's Cavalry (Frontier Force) was raised in 1849 at Lahore by Lieutenant Samuel J. Browne as the 2nd Punjab Irregular Cavalry. It was one of five regiments of Punjab Cavalry raised to guard the North West Frontier of India, soon part of the Punjab Frontier Force or the "Piffers". Over the next decades, the regiment saw extensive service on the Frontier. During the Indian Mutiny of 1857, the regiment was engaged in the Siege of Delhi, Relief of Lucknow, the Battle of Agra and the Campaign in Rohilkhand. In one of the actions, their commandant, Captain Sam Browne was awarded the Victoria Cross. His citation reads:

In an engagement with the rebels, Captain Browne, whilst advancing upon the enemy's position, pushed on with one orderly sowar upon a 9-pounder gun and attacked the gunners, preventing them from re-loading and attacking the infantry who were advancing to the attack. In the conflict which ensued, Captain Browne received two sword cuts, one on the left knee and one which severed his left arm at the shoulder, but not before he had cut down one of his assailants. The gun was eventually captured and the gunner killed.

It was the loss of his arm that caused Browne to invent the famous Sam Browne belt, still in the use of many of today's armies. The original belt is on display in the India Room at the Royal Military Academy Sandhurst.

Meanwhile, Captain Dighton Probyn was also awarded the Victoria Cross for gallantry, while serving with the 2nd Punjab Cavalry. His citation reads:

On many occasions during the period 1857–1858 in India, Captain Probyn performed gallant and daring acts. On one occasion, at the Battle of Agra, when his squadron charged the rebel infantry, he was sometimes separated from his men and surrounded by five or six sepoys. He defended himself and, before his own men had joined him, had cut down two of his assailants.

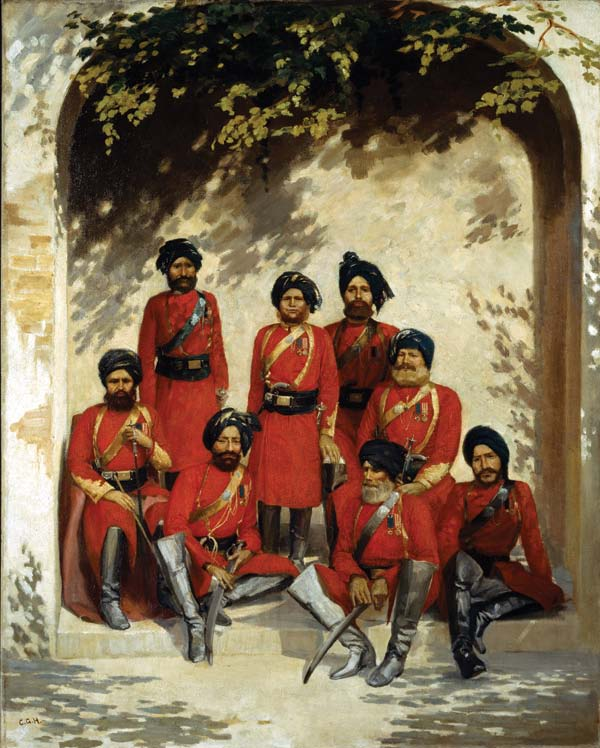
Officers of the 2nd Punjab Cavalry, 1880.

During the Second Anglo-Afghan War of 1878–80, the 2nd Punjab Cavalry was with the Kandahar Field Force, and fought at the Battle of Ahmed Khel in April 1880. During the First World War, the regiment served in the Mesopotamia Campaign.

=== Name changes ===
- 1849 2nd Punjab Irregular Cavalry
- 1851 2nd Regiment of Cavalry, Punjab Irregular Force
- 1861 2nd Regiment of Punjab Cavalry, Punjab Frontier Force
- 1901 2nd Punjab Cavalry
- 1903 22nd Cavalry (Frontier Force)
- 1904 22nd Sam Browne's Cavalry (Frontier Force)

== 25th Cavalry (Frontier Force) ==
The 25th Cavalry (Frontier Force) was raised by Captain Robert Fitzgerald as the 5th Punjab Irregular Cavalry at Multan in 1849, with Risaldar Gurmukh Singh Dhillon of Bahmaniwala village, Patti Sub Division of Amritsar district of the Punjab, as the first native Commandant of 5th Punjab Irregular Cavalry. The troops of the Sikh Squadron were mostly taken from the disbanded Khalsa Army which was recently defeated by the British in the Second Anglo-Sikh War of 1848. During the Indian Mutiny they were part of the besieging army at Delhi and took part in the Relief of Lucknow. The troops of 5th Punjab Irregular Cavalry were now avenging themselves on the mutinous Bengal Army for the defeat of the Khalsa's Sikh Army in the Anglo Sikh Wars. One squadron fought at Bareilly, where two of its Indian officers won the Order of British India and nine other ranks received the Indian Order of Merit. The regiment was involved in a number of small actions on the North West Frontier with the Punjab Frontier Force. In March 1860, 150 men under an Indian officer attacked a 3,000 strong armed force of Mahsuds and Waziris at Tank, killing 300 and dispersing the others. In January 1867, an Indian officer with 27 sowars charged a body of 1,000 tribesmen, killed 150 and captured most of the rest. During the Second Afghan War, the 5th Punjab Cavalry were present at the capture of Charasiah and Frederick Roberts the Commanding General ordered that they and the 9th Lancers should have the honour of escorting him into Kabul. During the attack on the Asmai Heights in December 1879, near Kabul, Captain William John Vousden made repeated charges with a small body of men of the 5th Punjab Cavalry, passing through the ranks of an overwhelming force again and again until the enemy fled. Vousden received a Victoria Cross and his ten surviving men the Indian Order of Merit.

For their excellent record in the Indian Mutiny and the Second Afghan War, the 5th Punjab Cavalry was among the units honoured during the Diamond Jubilee of Queen Victoria's celebrations in London in June and July 1897. Risaldar-Major Kesar Singh Dhillon of Bahmaniwala Dhillons represented the 5th Punjab Cavalry as part of Indian Native Cavalry. For the acts of valour during the Indian Mutiny and during the Second Afghan War, the troops of 5th Punjab Cavalry were awarded grants of agricultural land in Lyallpur District in 1904. Most of the Sikh troops of Kanhayia Misl shifted from Amritsar District to Lyallpur on being granted lands there. During the First World War, it served in German East Africa, followed by service in the Third Afghan War of 1919.

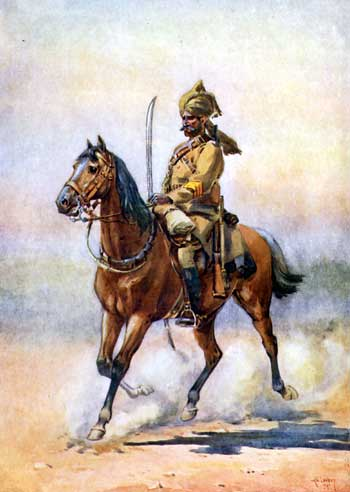
A Pathan Daffadar of 25th Cavalry (Frontier Force). Watercolour by AC Lovett, 1910.

=== Name changes ===
- 1849 5th Punjab Irregular Cavalry
- 1851 5th Regiment of Cavalry, Punjab Irregular Force
- 1861 5th Regiment of Punjab Cavalry, Punjab Frontier Force
- 1901 5th Punjab Cavalry
- 1903 25th Cavalry (Frontier Force)

== 12th Cavalry (Frontier Force) ==
After the First World War, the number of Indian cavalry regiments was reduced from thirty-nine to twenty-one. However, instead of disbanding the surplus units, it was decided to amalgamate them in pairs. This resulted in renumbering and renaming of the entire cavalry line. The 22nd Sam Browne's Cavalry (Frontier Force) and 25th Cavalry (Frontier Force) were amalgamated in 1921 to form 12th Cavalry. The uniform of 12th Cavalry was scarlet with blue facings. The badge showed a mounted figure within a circle carrying the title 'Sam Browne's Cavalry XII FF' with a crown above. Its class composition was one squadron each of Punjabi Muslims, Sikhs and Dogras. In 1937, 12th Cavalry became the training regiment of 2nd Indian Cavalry Group at Ferozepur. It was converted into a training centre in 1940 by amalgamating it with 15th Lancers.

On the partition of India in 1947, this training centre was transferred to Pakistan. On 15 January 1955, 12th Cavalry (Frontier Force) was re-raised at Rawalpindi as a Reconnaissance Regiment of Pakistan Armoured Corps. The regiment served with distinction during the 1965 and 1971 Indo-Pakistani Wars. During the 1965 War, the regiment fought in four different sectors simultaneously when all four squadrons of the regiment operated independently at Chawinda, Bedian, Khemkaran and Sialkot. Lt.Col Muhammad Asaf Hussain Khan was awarded the Sitara-e-Jurat for outstanding gallantry in the Khemkaran sector during the 1965 war.

Captains Ahmed Arsalan Asaf and Nadeem Ahmad Raja were the Siachin Warriors of 12th Cavalary, Asaf participating in Operation Naveed Top during the Siachen conflict in April 1989.

Captain Mearaj Muhammad of the 12th Cavalary was killed on 4 June 2009 while fighting with Taliban militants in Buner District. He was awarded the Sitara-e-Basalat by the Government of Pakistan for his bravery and sacrifice.

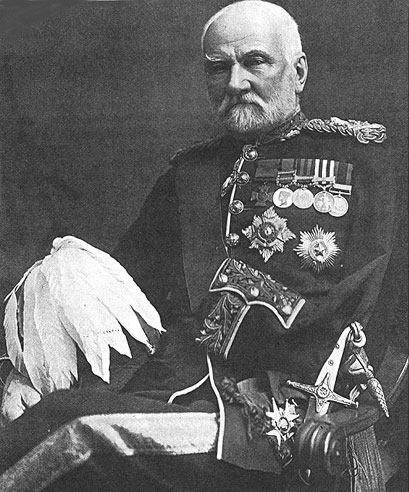
General Sir Sam Browne, VC, GCB, KCSI, 1897.

=== Name changes ===
- 1921 22nd/25th Cavalry (amalgamation)
- 1922 12th Cavalry (Frontier Force)
- 1927 Sam Browne's Cavalry (12th Frontier Force)
- 1940 1st Indian Armoured Corps Centre
- 1947 Pakistan Armoured Corps Centre
- 1955 12th Cavalry (Frontier Force) (re-raised)

== Affiliations & Alliances ==
- (Pakistan) The Frontier Force Regiment
- (United Kingdom) 9th/12th Royal Lancers
