= Battle of Charasiab =

1879 battle of the Second Anglo-Afghan War

- Part of the Second Anglo-Afghan War
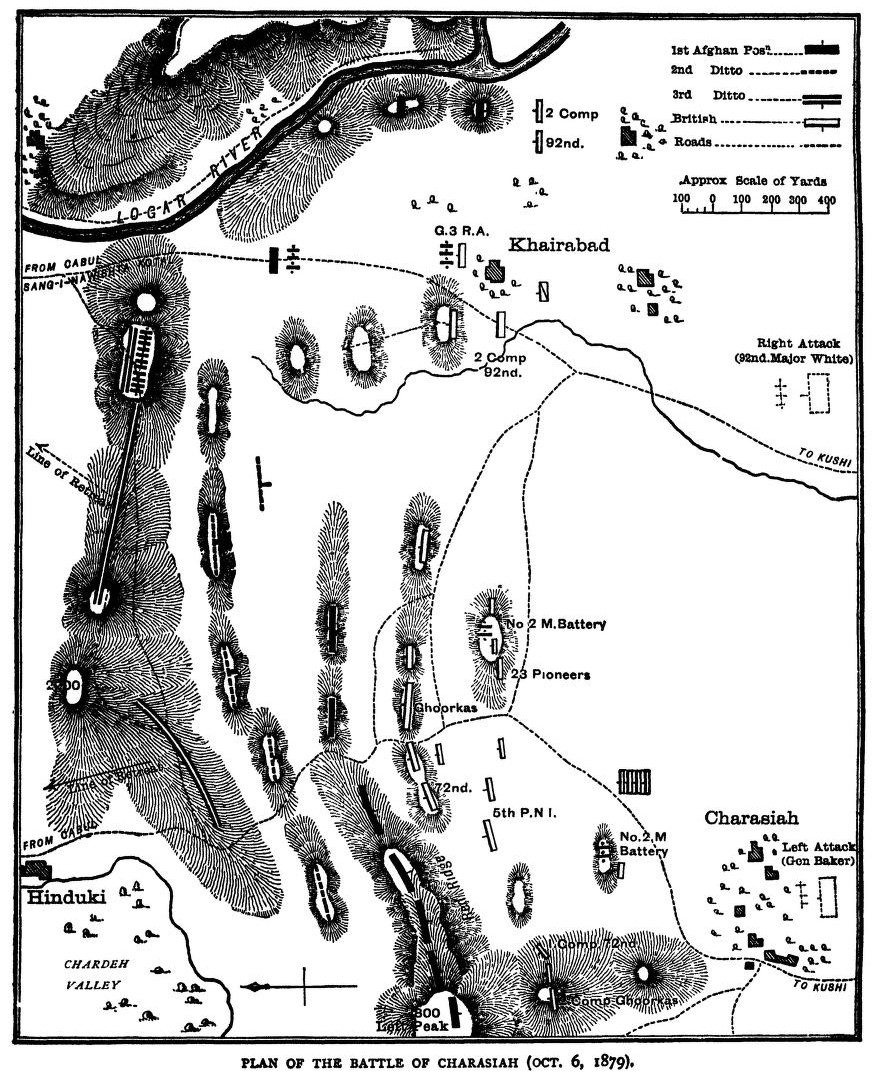
- Plan of the battle of Charasiab (Recent British Battles on Land and Sea, 1884)
Date	6 October 1879
Location	Char Asiab, Afghanistan 34°23′55″N 69°10′3″E
Result	British victory

Belligerents
(United Kingdom of Great Britain and Ireland) British Empire: India	(Emirate of Afghanistan) Afghans

Commanders and leaders
(United Kingdom of Great Britain and Ireland) Major-General Frederick Roberts	Nek Mohammed Khan

Strength
3,800 men	12,000 Afghan army troops and tribesmen

Casualties and losses
18 killed, 70 wounded	Over 300 killed

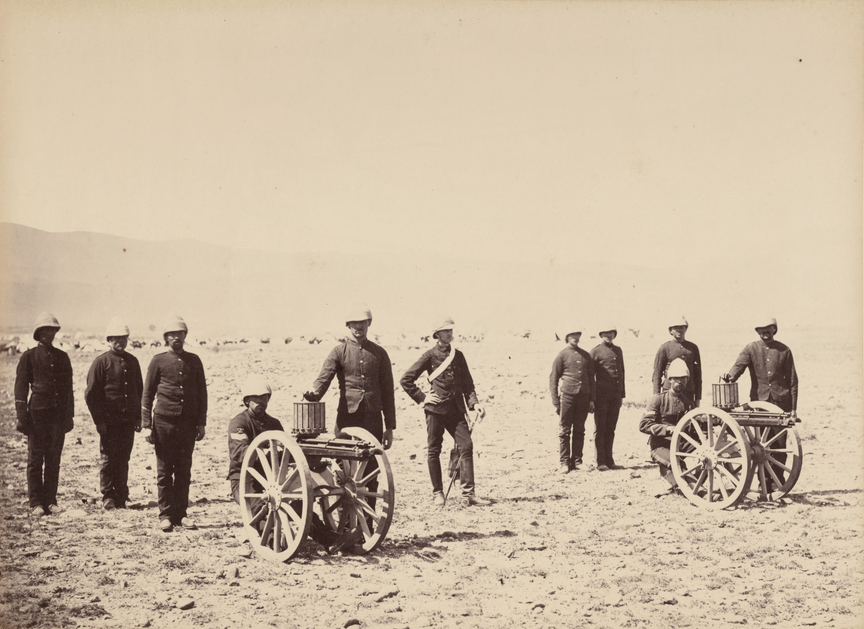
Gatling guns with British forces during the Afghan War

The Battle of Charasiab was fought on 6 October 1879 during the Second Anglo-Afghan War between British and Indian troops against Afghan regular forces and tribesmen.

== The battle ==
The first phase of the Afghan War ended in May 1879 with the Treaty of Gandamak. However, when in September 1879 the British envoy in Kabul was murdered, the war recommenced. A Kabul Field Force was created, commanded by Major-General Sir Frederick Roberts, which advanced on Kabul. On the evening of 5 October 1879, Roberts reached Charasiab, a small town 12 kilometres (7.5 mi) south of Kabul, where he camped overnight, awaiting the arrival of his force's baggage. The next morning, 6 October, saw a large force of regular Afghan soldiers, equipped with artillery and reinforced by local tribesmen, on the ridge of the hills ahead. It was led by Nek Mohammed Khan, Governor of Kabul and uncle of former Amir Yakub Khan, who intended to attack the British.

Attacking first, Roberts' force feinted to the left of the Afghan line, before launching his main attack to the right. The fighting lasted several hours, but eventually the Afghan army was pushed back, and by 3:45 pm the British-led force had opened the route to Kabul. After this, Roberts resumed his advance and occupied Kabul on 13 October.

British casualties amounted to 18 killed and 70 wounded, while Afghans deaths exceeded 300. Twenty Afghan field guns were captured, including an eight-inch brass howitzer previously presented to the Afghan government by the British; as was a large proportion of the small arms and ammunition used during the battle.

The British force was equipped with two Gatling guns, with Charasiab the first time these rapid fire guns were used in action.

The spelling of the battle varied. The formal dispatch published in The London Gazette stated 'Charasiab', the regiments present received the battle honour 'Charasiah', while General Roberts' memoirs and the clasp authorised for the Afghanistan Medal referred to 'Charasia'.

== Order of battle ==
The following regiments participated in the battle:

=== British Army ===
- 9th Lancers (1 squadron)
- Royal Horse Artillery (F/A Brigade)
- Royal Artillery (G/3 Battery)
- 67th Foot
- 72nd Highlanders
- 92nd Highlanders

=== Indian Army ===
- 5th Cavalry, Punjab Frontier Force
- 12th Bengal Cavalry
- 14th Bengal Lancers
- 2nd Derajat Mountain Battery
- Bengal Sappers and Miners
- 23rd Bengal Native Infantry (Pioneers)
- 3rd Sikh Infantry
- 5th Punjabis (Vaughan’s Rifles)
- 28th Bengal Native Infantry (Punjabis)
- 5th Gurkha Rifles
