= 14th Murray's Jat Lancers =

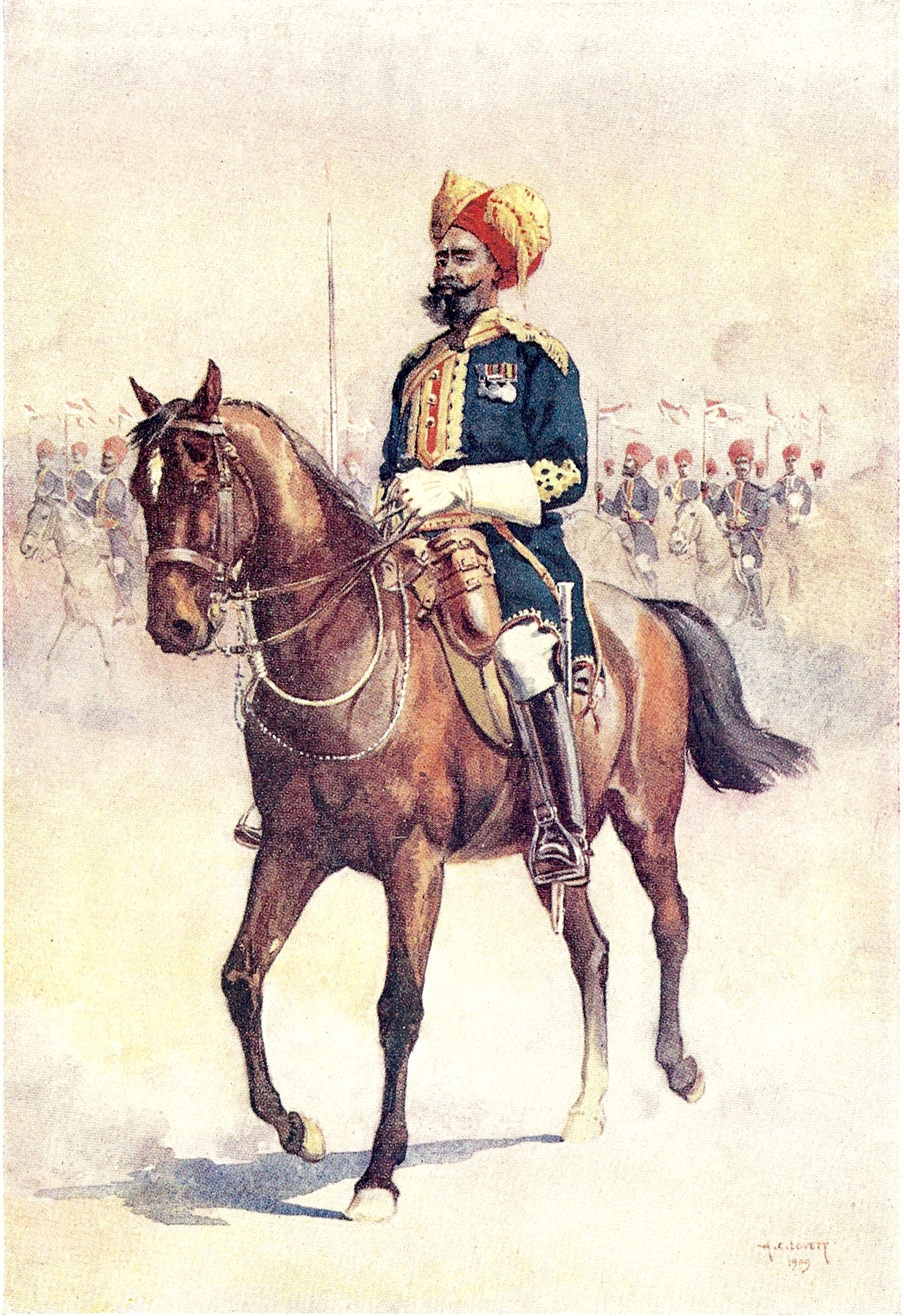
- Risaldar Major Ramji Lal of 14th Murray's Jat Lancers, c. 1909, by AC Lovett (1862-1919)
- Active: 1857-1921
- Country: (East India Company) Company ruled India; British India
- Allegiance: East India Company (1857-1858); British India (1858-1921)
- Branch: Bengal Army (1857-1895); British Indian Army (1895-1921)
- Type: Cavalry
- Size: Regiment
- Engagements: Indian Rebellion of 1857
- Battle honours: Charasiah; Kabul 1879; Afghanistan 1897-80; Northwest Frontier India 1915; Kut-al-Amara 1917; Sharqat; Mesopotamia 1916–18

The 14th Murray's Jat Lancers, also sometimes known as the Murray's Jat Horse, was a cavalry regiment of the British Indian Army. In 1921 it was renamed as 20th Lancers, and after Partition of India in 1947 it eventually became 20 Lancers (India) as an armoured regiment of the Indian Army. Its Muslim soldiers were retained in the regiment which is now known as the 20th Lancers (Pakistan).

== History ==
The regiment was first raised at Aligarh as an irregular cavalry unit in 1857 as the Jat Horse Yeomanry, for the East India Company by Captain John Irvine Murray then serving with the Gwalior Contingent. It was raised from 250 sepoys and 120 sowars (cavalrymen) recruited from the Jats of the rural areas of Hathras, Mathura, Bulandshahr, Aligarh, and Khurja in present Uttar Pradesh, and Palwal and Hodal in present Haryana, who were offered by Thakur Gobind Singh, a Jat chieftain of Khair in Aligarh, to combat the 1857 uprising, and thus became the first regiment to be manned completely with Jat troops in the British Indian Army.

Until 1861, the regiment was paid for by private funds of the British officers and Indian Risaldars. Later the Regimental Centre and Officers' Mess was established at Palwal. The regiment participated in a number of actions in 1857–58, especially at Meerut, the Siege of Delhi and the Siege of Lucknow, but did not qualify for any battle honour. Subedar Pratap Singh was the first Subedar of the HQ Squadron of the regiment in 1857–61.

Murray's Lancers subsequently served in the Bhutan Field Force during the Duar War (1864–65).

The regiment formed part of the cavalry brigade of the Kabul Field Force during the Second Anglo-Afghan War (1878–790. The regiment participated in a difficult cavalry charge over extremely difficult ground and routed the Afghan line at the Battle of Charasiab, 15 km from Kabul, on 6 October 1879 for which the regiment was awarded the battle honour "Charasiah" and the theatre honour "Afghanistan 1878–79".

The regiment was mentioned in despatches by General Frederick Roberts, 1st Earl Roberts, who wrote:

I always remember the good work done by the regiment (14th Jat Lancers) when we were hard pressed by the Afghans in the Chardeh valley on the 11th December 1879. The retirement by squadrons was carried out as if on parade.

In 1921, the regiment was merged with the 15th Lancers (Cureton's Multanis) to form the to form 14th/15th Cavalry. This unit was renamed 20th Lancers in 1922 and transferred to the Indian Army after Partition of India in 1947.

=== Designations ===
Like all regiments of the Indian Army the 14th Murray's Jat Lancers underwent many name changes in the various reorganisations:

- 1857 The Jat Horse Yeomanry
- 1859 Murray's Jat Horse
- 1861 14th Regiment of Bengal Cavalry
- 1864 14th Bengal Cavalry (Lancers)
- 1874 14th Bengal Lancers
- 1901 14th Bengal Lancers (Murray's Jat Horse)
- 1903 14th Murray's Jat Lancers
- 1921 Amalgamated with 15th Lancers (Cureton's Multanis) to form 14th/15th Cavalry.
- 1922 20th Lancers

== Battle honours ==
The regiment has the following battle honours :

- Charasiah
- Kabul 1879
- Afghanistan 1878–80
- Northwest Frontier India 1915
- Kut-al-Amara 1917
- Sharqat
- Mesopotamia 1916–18

== In popular culture ==
The 14th Murray's Jat Lancers appear as (Jat Lancer) in the computer game Age of Empires III: The Asian Dynasties.

== See also ==
- Sikh Regiment
