= M36 tank destroyer =

90 mm Gun Motor Carriage M36
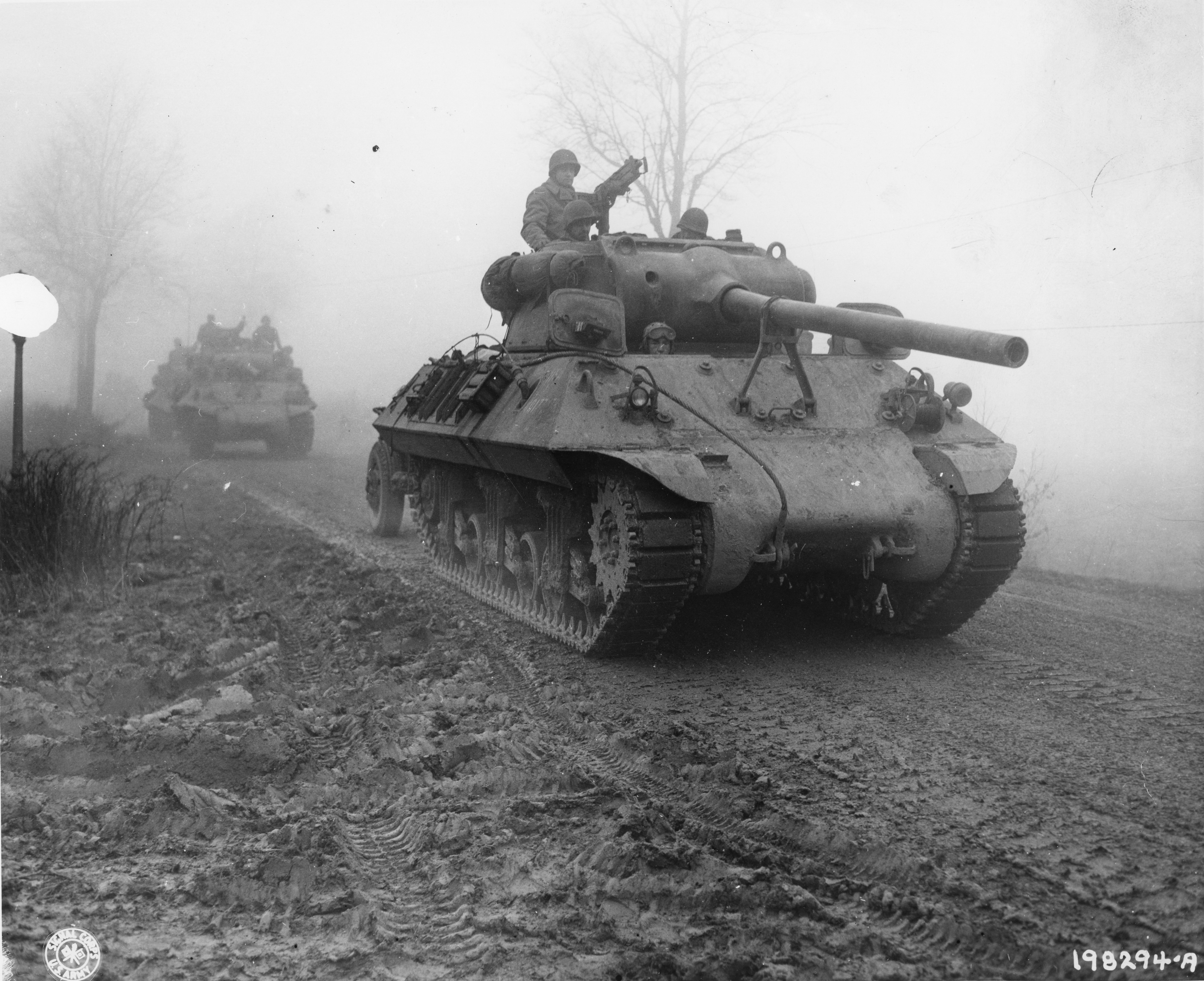
- M36 tank destroyer moving in heavy fog on 20 December 1944 during the Battle of the Bulge, Belgium.
- Type: Self-propelled anti-tank gun
- Place of origin: United States

Service history
- Wars: World War II; First Indochina War; Korean War; Second Taiwan Strait Crisis; Indo-Pakistani War of 1965; Indo-Pakistani War of 1971; Iran–Iraq War; Slovenian War 1991; Croatian War 1991-95; Bosnian War; Kosovo War

Production history
- Designer: U.S. Army Ordnance Department
- Designed: 1943
- Manufacturer: General Motors; Massey-Harris; American Locomotive Company; Montreal Locomotive Works
- Unit cost: US$51,290 (equivalent to $938,054 in 2025) (M36)
- Produced: April–August 1944; October–December 1944; May 1945
- No. built: 2,324 (all models)
- Variants: See Variants

Specifications (90 mm Gun Motor Carriage M36)
- Mass: 63,000 lb (32 short tons; 29 t)
- Length: 19 ft 7 in (5.97 m) hull; 24 ft 6 in (7.47 m) including gun
- Width: 10 ft 0 in (3.05 m)
- Height: 10 ft 9 in (3.28 m) over antiaircraft machine gun
- Crew: 5 (Commander, gunner, loader, driver, assistant driver)
- Armor: 0.375 to 2 in (9.5 to 50.8 mm)
- Main armament: 90 mm gun M3; 47 rounds
- Secondary armament: .50 caliber (12.7 mm) Browning M2HB machine gun 1,000 rounds
- Engine: M36, M36B1:Ford GAA V8 gasoline engine; 450 hp (340 kW) at 2,600 rpm; M36B2:General Motors 6046 twin inline diesel engine; 375 hp (280 kW) at 2,100 rpm
- Power/weight: 15.2 hp (11.3 kW)/metric ton
- Transmission: Synchromesh; 5 speeds forward, 1 reverse
- Suspension: Vertical volute spring suspension (VVSS)
- Fuel capacity: 192 US gallons (727 litres)
- Operational range: 150 mi (240 km)
- Maximum speed: 26 mph (42 km/h) on road

The M36 tank destroyer, formally 90 mm Gun Motor Carriage, M36, was an American tank destroyer used during World War II. The M36 combined the hull of the M10 tank destroyer, which used the M4 Sherman's reliable chassis and drivetrain combined with sloped armor, and a new turret mounting the 90 mm gun M3. Conceived in 1943, the M36 first served in combat in Europe in October 1944, where it partially replaced the M10 tank destroyer. It also saw use in the Korean War, where it was able to defeat any of the Soviet tanks used in that conflict. Some were supplied to South Korea as part of the Military Assistance Program and served for years, as did re-engined examples found in Yugoslavia, which operated into the 1990s. Two remained in service with the Republic of China Army at least until 2001. In 2010, the last Taiwanese M36 was preserved at Kinmen National Park.

The vehicle is also known by the nickname General Jackson, or just Jackson, named after Confederate general Stonewall Jackson, which was originally assigned to the vehicle by the Ordnance Department in November 1944 for publicity purposes, such as in newspapers, but does not appear to have been used by troops in the field during the war.

== Doctrine ==
U.S. combined arms doctrine on the eve of World War II held that tanks should be designed to fulfill the role of forcing a breakthrough into enemy rear areas. Separate GHQ tank battalions would support infantry in destroying fixed enemy defenses, and armored divisions would then exploit the breakthrough to rush into the enemy's vulnerable rear areas. U.S. tanks were expected to fight any hostile tanks they encountered in their attack, but the mission of defeating massed enemy armored counterattacks was assigned to a new branch, the Tank Destroyer Force. Tank destroyer units were meant to counter German blitzkrieg tactics. They were to be held as a reserve at the corps or army level, and were to move quickly to the site of any massed enemy tank breakthrough, maneuvering aggressively and using ambush tactics (charging or chasing enemy tanks was explicitly prohibited) to destroy enemy tanks. This led to a requirement for fast, well-armed vehicles. Though equipped with turrets (unlike most self-propelled anti-tank guns of the day), the typical American design was more heavily gunned, but more lightly armored, and thus more maneuverable, than a contemporary tank. The idea was to use speed and agility to bring a powerful self-propelled anti-tank gun into action against enemy tanks.

== Design ==
With the advent of heavy German tanks such as the Panther and Tiger, the standard U.S. tank destroyer, the M10, was rapidly becoming obsolete, because its main armament, the 3-inch gun M7, had difficulty defeating the thick frontal armor of the newer tanks past several hundred yards. In late summer 1942 American engineers had begun examining the potential of a new tank destroyer armed with a 90mm gun, and produced the prototype 90 mm Gun Motor Carriage T53, which placed the 90 mm gun in an open mounting at the rear of an M4 Sherman chassis. In August 1942, it was agreed to immediately produce 500 vehicles, with 3,500 more later. The Tank Destroyer Force objected, arguing that the design of the T53 was too rushed. The 90 mm Gun Motor Carriage T53E1 proved to be even worse, and the contract was canceled.

In October 1942, the Ordnance Department tested mounting the experimental 90 mm gun T7 into the turret of an M10 tank destroyer. General Andrew Bruce, head of the Tank Destroyer Force, objected to the project, favoring the lighter Gun Motor Carriage M18 'Hellcat', but was ignored. Mounting the 90 mm gun was straightforward, but the gun proved too heavy for the M10's turret, and a new turret was designed with power traverse, and a massive counterweight to balance the gun. The first two M36 prototypes, designated 90 mm Gun Motor Carriage T71 were completed in September 1943. Initially, a request for full production was denied as 90 mm guns were already being studied for use on tanks, but Army Ground Forces approved the project in October 1943, and tests began. The ring mount on the left side of the turret for the .50 caliber Browning M2HB antiaircraft machine gun was changed to a pintle mount at the rear. It was decided that production vehicles would use the chassis of the M10A1 tank destroyer, as the M10A1 had superior automotive characteristics, and significant numbers were available. After testing, an initial order for 300 vehicles was issued. The T71 was designated upon standardization on 1 June 1944 as the 90 mm Gun Motor Carriage M36.

== Production ==
Production of M36, M36B1, and M36B2
Month	M36	M36B1	M36B2
April 1944	25		
May 1944	100		
June 1944	120		
July 1944	155		
August 1944	100		
October 1944	75	50	
November 1944	290	93	
December 1944	348	44	
May 1945	10		50
Post-war	190		674
Total	1,413	187	724

After July 1943, the appliqué armor (add on armor) bosses on the hull side of later M10A1s were omitted as the armor kits were never manufactured. The M36 initially retained the M10A1's "stirrup" gun rest on the rear hull; crews were unhappy about the lack of a travel lock to hold the 90 mm gun in a fixed position when in motion, and many improvised their own from travel locks taken from tanks. A double-baffle muzzle brake was fitted to all vehicles after the first 600, beginning in early November 1944. A folding travel lock better-suited to the 90 mm gun was added to the rear hull at about this time. The gun itself was also modified with a better equilibrator and more powerful elevating mechanism.

As the initial contract was for 300 vehicles, General Motors' Fisher Tank Arsenal produced the last 300 M10A1 tank destroyers in January 1944 without turrets for immediate conversion to M36s, which took place from April to July 1944. The contract was later increased to 500 vehicles, as it was decided that existing M10A1s were also to be converted to M36s. The requirement was later increased to 600 vehicles on 15 May 1944. As it was found that the M10 tank destroyer had struggled against German tanks like the Panther and especially the Tiger during the Normandy campaign, the contract was increased to 1,400 vehicles on 29 July 1944. This caused problems, as only 913 of the 1,413 M10A1s that had been completed could be requisitioned from training units. Due to the lack of M10A1 hulls, it was decided to finish up the initial production run by mounting M36 turrets onto M4A3 Sherman hulls (which had the same engine as the M10A1) with the necessary internal changes; these were designated M36B1. The production of 187 90 mm Gun Motor Carriage M36B1 ran from October to December 1944. From June to December 1944, Massey-Harris converted 500 M10A1s into M36s. From October to December 1944, American Locomotive Company converted 413 M10A1s into M36s. The Army reduced the 1,400-vehicle objective for 1944 to 1,342 vehicles. 350 more conversions were scheduled for 1945; this number was increased to 584. A final batch of 200 M10A1s was converted by the Montreal Locomotive Works in May 1945.

The supply of M10A1s eventually ran out, so it was decided in January 1945 that M10 hulls would be used for all further conversions. American Locomotive Company converted 672 M10 hulls into the 90 mm Gun Motor Carriage M36B2 beginning in May 1945. A further batch of 52 M36B2s was completed by the Montreal Locomotive Works in May 1945.

== Combat use ==
=== World War II ===
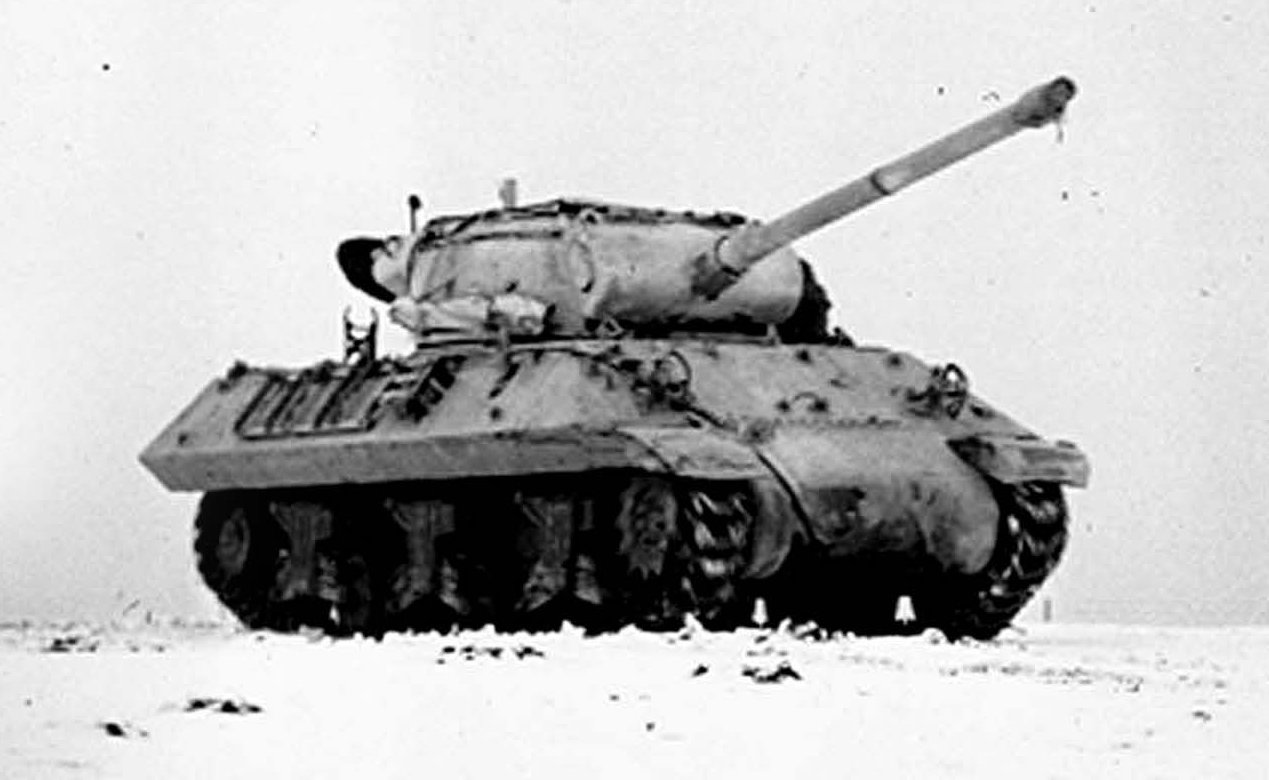
90 mm GMC M36 during the Battle of the Bulge in January 1945

The first 40 M36s were not shipped overseas until September 1944, and entered combat in October 1944. The US First and Ninth Armies used M36s to re-equip tank destroyer battalions attached to armored divisions. The 703rd Tank Destroyer Battalion began re-equipping on 30 September 1944. The Third US Army used them to re-equip towed battalions. The 610th Tank Destroyer Battalion (Towed) began retraining on 25 September 1944. The first tank destroyer battalion to receive the M36 in early September, the 776th, was in transit from Italy at the time and did not use them in combat until October 1944. By the end of 1944, seven tank destroyer battalions had converted to the M36; the M36 had mostly replaced the M10 by the end of the war.

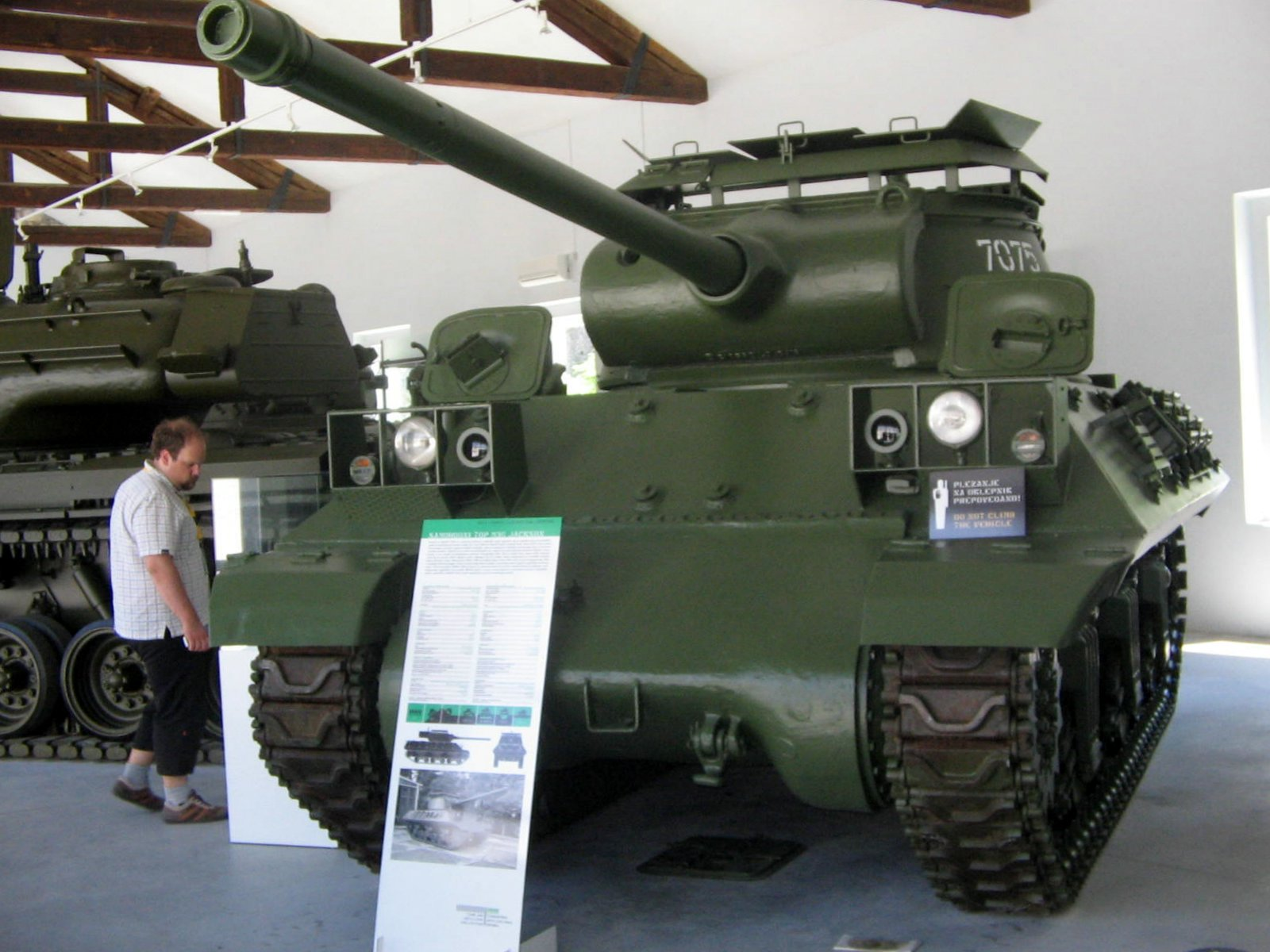
Yugoslav M36 Jackson in Pivka - retrofitted with 500 hp diesel, 1991

The M36 was well-liked by its crews, being one of the few armored fighting vehicles available to US forces that could destroy heavy German tanks from a distance. An 814th gunner, Lt Alfred Rose, scored a kill against a Panther at 4,600 yards (4200 meters), the maximum range of the telescopic sight. However, the Panther's 82 to 85mm thick glacis plate could deflect shots at certain angles from the 90 mm gun at just 150 yards (137 meters). Testing done in December 1944 by the 703rd Tank Destroyer Battalion concluded that the M36's 90mm Gun would theoretically not be able to penetrate the frontal armor of a Tiger II at any range with the ammunition that was available to them. It was tactically viable to engage Panther tanks from the side.

=== Korean War ===
The M36 was used by the US Army in the Korean War. It could destroy any Soviet-made AFV encountered there. One postwar modification was the addition of a ball-mounted machine gun on the co-driver's side, as in many other armored fighting vehicles of the time. Due to the shortage of M26 and M46 tanks, the M36 became one of the preferred armored vehicles for U.S. Military Assistance Program transfers.

The M36 was classified as a tank by the Republic of Korea Army despite being a self-propelled gun. The South Korean army, which began the war without having a single tank, pushed for the creation of an armored unit and acquired the first six M36s for training in late October 1950. During the war, the South Korean Army received about 200 M36/M36B2s from the US, and operated 9 tank companies. Each company was assigned to the frontline infantry division, and each tank platoon, consisting of five M36s, was attached to an infantry regiment for fire support missions. South Korean M36s retained the latest updates such as the M3A1 main gun and turret top armor. These Korean War GMCs also installed machine gun ball mount for the assistant driver to fight against infantry. The M36 played a powerful role by direct firing at the enemy's position during the battle for high ground. Since it was operated by Koreans, command and communication between infantry and armored units were smooth, and it had a significant effect on boosting morale.

During the Battle of White Horse during 6–15 October 1952, the 53rd Tank Company, assigned to the 9th Infantry Division, contributed to the victory by bombarding the side of the enemy's offensive force and suppressing heavy weapons deployed on the enemy-occupied highlands. In the Battle of Betty Hill on 15–16 July 1953, the 57th Tank Company of the 3rd Tank Battalion provided direct fire support for a platoon defending the highlands overnight, which claimed the lives of 300 communist soldiers. However, the M36 had limitations for large-scale operations due to the equipment already being retired from the U.S. military: spare parts were scarce, and it was difficult to obtain further fully functional vehicles. Servicing became even harder because units were scattered around infantry units. Therefore, the Korean Army began operating in large numbers, forming three armored battalions in early 1953.

=== Indo-Pakistani Wars ===
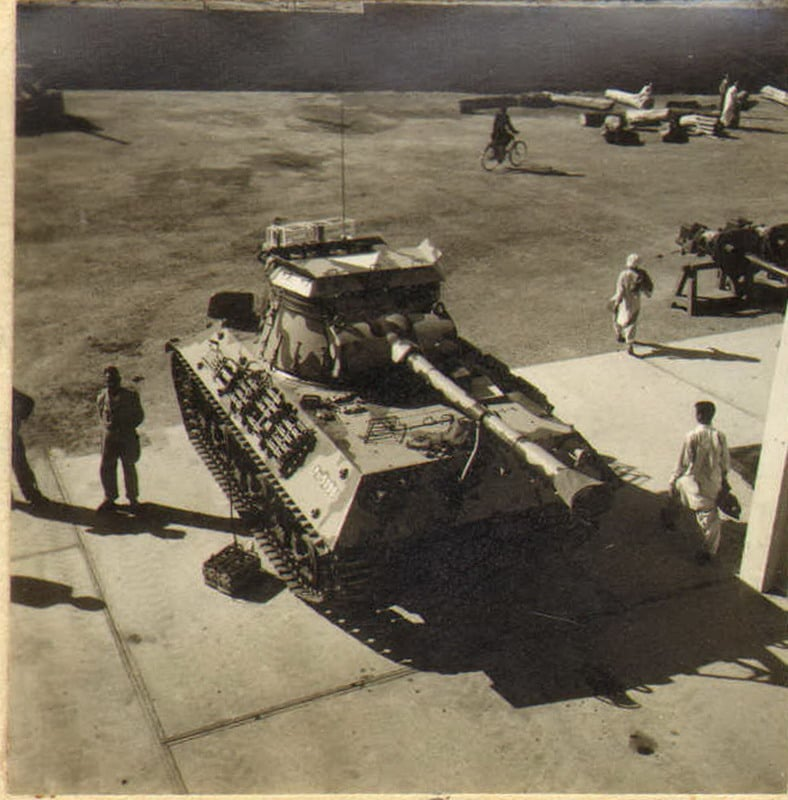
A Pakistani M36B2 at an operational base in the 1960s.

Pakistan procured between 25 and 75 M36B2s in 1956, which were refurbished second-hand units from US stocks. Its 90 mm gun had better performance than the 76 mm M4A1E6 Shermans used by the Pakistani Armoured Corps. The M36s were called "Tank Busters" in the Pakistan Army they were disliked by soldiers of the Pakistani Armoured Corps., primarily due to its complexity and unforgiving nature for new and inexperienced operators. Colonel M. Yahya Effendi who served with the 11th Cavalry in the 1965 war recollects that:

It was an awkward fighting vehicle in every sense. The synchronization of the engines was a nuisance for the mechanics, and while driving, an inexperienced or flappy driver could smash the single plate clutch by sudden release, thus immobilizing the vehicle.

Their first combat use by the Pakistan Army was in early September 1965 during Operation Grand Slam at Chumb when 11 M36B2s under the command of Major Mian Raza Shah of the 11th Cavalry fought against AMX-13s of the Indian 20 Lancers. Despite winning the battle, the M36s had performed poorly; only two M36s were in fighting condition after the confrontation; most had broken down in the early hours of the battle, with a few (including the CO's M36) being knocked out by Indian fire.

The M36s saw more action on the Lahore Front. In the Battle of Phillora, the Pakistani 11th Cavalry, which had twelve M36B2s along with its main force of M48s, fought an intense five-day battle against Centurion MBTs of the Indian Poona Horse and Hodson's Horse. At one instance on 11 September, mechanic Daffadar Haq Nawaz took command of an M36B2 whose commander had been injured, and destroyed two Indian Centurions before his M36B2 was fatally hit. At the Chawinda, the Guides Cavalry was equipped with a squadron of M36B2s, deployed to guard the artillery units. The M36B2 was phased out of the Armoured Corps after the war.

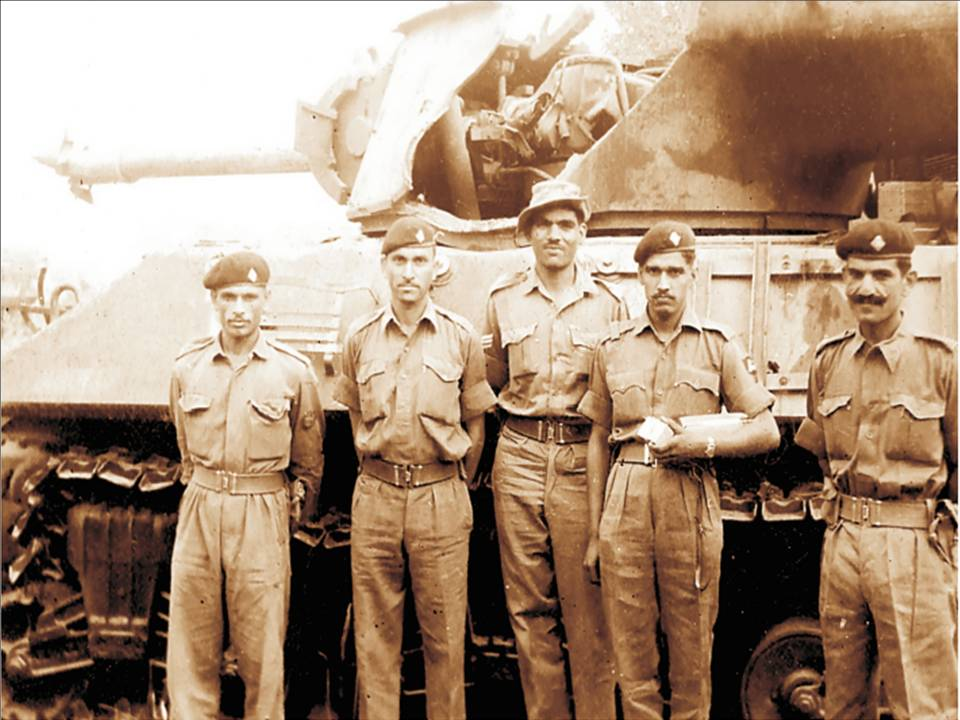
Indian soldiers stand beside a knocked out Pakistani M36B2.

Despite being obsolete by the time of the 1971 War, some independent squadrons of the Pakistani Armored Corps received a number of M36B2s. A depleted squadron of M36B2s of "Manto Force" saw action during the Battle of Chumb while 14th Independent Armored Squadron took part in the Battle of Barapind.

=== Other wars ===
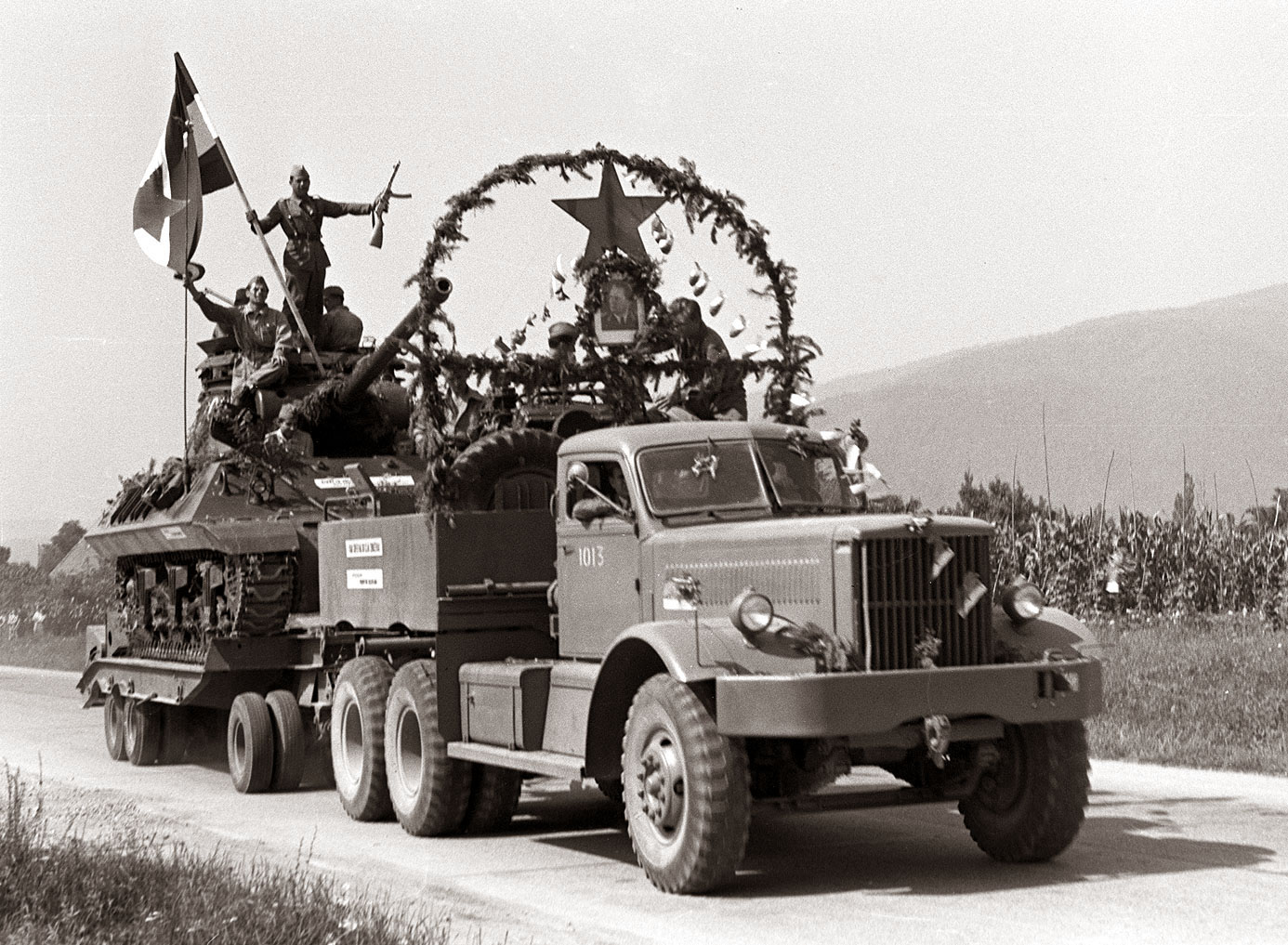
Yugoslav M36 in Maribor, 1958

M36s were also exported after World War II to various countries. They were used by the French army during the First Indochina War. The Republic of China Army acquired eight ex-French examples in 1955. They were stationed in Kinmen Island group, and saw combat during the Second Taiwan Strait Crisis in 1958. They were deemed more maneuverable than the bigger M48A3 and later CM11/12 MBTs, while being more powerful than M24 and M41 light tanks. As of April 2001, at least two still remained in service with troops in Lieyu Township.

Another recipient was Yugoslavia, which received 399. The engine was later replaced by the 500 hp Soviet-made diesel engine used in T-55 main battle tanks. Yugoslavian M36s participated in the Slovenian War of Independence (1991) and Croatian War of Independence (1991–1995), but they were withdrawn immediately from service with the Croatian Armed Forces after the war. M36s were also used by Serbian forces in Bosnia and Croatia, and they were used during the Kosovo War as decoys for NATO air strikes.

== Armor ==
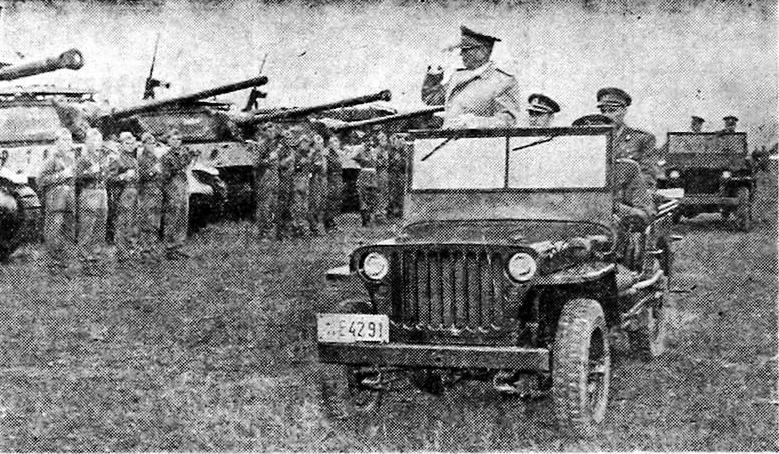
Tito inspects an M36 armored unit

American tank destroyer doctrine emphasized speed and gun power over armor. As the M10 and M36 were not purpose-built tank destroyers (they were based on tank chassis) they were not as fast as the Tank Destroyer Force wanted. General Andrew Bruce criticized the M36 due to it being too slow. The armor configuration of the M36 was identical to that of the M10A1, save the turret. The thickness of the M36's armor ranged from 0.375 to 5.0 in (9.5 to 127.0 mm).

The lower hull had 1 in (25 mm) thick armor on the sides and rear. The rounded, cast transmission cover was 2 in (51 mm) thick. Like the M10, the M36 did not have an extra 0.5 in (13 mm) floor plate under the driver's and assistant driver's stations to provide additional protection against mines. The glacis plate was 1.5 in (38 mm) thick, sloped at 55 degrees from the vertical, and had eight large bosses on it to attach appliqué armor plates. The sides and rear of the upper hull were 0.75 in (19 mm) thick, sloped at 38 degrees from the vertical. Earlier M10s converted to M36s had 12 appliqué armor bosses on each side of the M36's upper hull. The rear upper hull plate was used for storage of the vehicle's pioneer tools; an axe, a crowbar, a mattock handle and head, a double-sided 10 lb (4.5 kg) sledgehammer, and a track tensioning wrench, so no appliqué armor bosses could be fitted there. The sides and rear of the upper hull had angled extensions or covers over the upper run of track. These extensions often got in the way of fitting duckbill extended end connectors, used to reduce ground pressure on soft ground, and were often removed, along with the front fenders, by maintenance units. The hull roof plate ranged from 0.75 in (19 mm) thick over the driver's and assistant driver's stations and turret ring, to 0.5 in (13 mm) thick over the engine compartment.

The M36B1 had the hull armor configuration of the late production M4A3 Sherman tank.

The sides of the M36's rounded turret were made of rolled armor plate 1.25 in (32 mm) thick. A massive hollow cast counterweight was welded to the rear of the turret to balance the heavy gun. The top was 0.38 to 1 in (9.7 to 25.4 mm) thick, the sides were 1.25 in (32 mm) thick, and the rear was 1.75 to 5 in (44 to 127 mm) thick. The rounded cast gun shield was 3 in (76 mm) thick.

== Armament ==
=== Primary ===
The M36 tank destroyer used an M10A1 chassis (the M36B1 used an M4A3 Sherman chassis, while the M36B2 used an M10 chassis) mounting a large, open-topped turret mounting a 90 mm gun M3. The gunner aimed the gun using the M76F telescope. The 90 mm gun M3 was the standardized version of the experimental T7, a derivative of the 90 mm gun developed as a vehicle-mounted antitank weapon. The M36 carried 47 rounds of main gun ammunition, 11 of which were stowed in the hollow counterweight, while 36 rounds were stowed in the sponsons. For combat use, the 90mm gun M3 could fire five types of ammunition:

- M77 AP-T shot
- T33 APCBC-T shot
- M82 APC/HE-T shell
- M71 HE shell
- T30E16 (M304) HVAP-T shot

The M82 armor-piercing capped shot was the main round used for engaging enemy tanks. It had a large explosive filler to increase damage after penetration. It was capable of penetrating 129 mm (5.1 in) of armor angled at 30 degrees from the vertical at 500 yd (0.28 mi; 0.46 km) and 122 mm (4.8 in) of armor at 1,000 yd (0.57 mi; 0.91 km). The T30E16 HVAP shot was capable of penetrating 221 mm (8.7 in) of armor angled at 30 degrees from the vertical at 500 yd (0.28 mi; 0.46 km), and 199 mm (7.8 in) of armor at 1,000 yd (0.57 mi; 0.91 km). The T30E16 HVAP round had difficulty with the highly sloped glacis plate of the German Panther tank, so the T33 AP shot was developed to solve this problem. The T33 shot was a normal substitute standard M77 armor piercing shot that was heat-treated to improve its hardness and fitted with a ballistic windshield to improve its drag characteristics. The T33 and T30E16 were only issued in very small numbers towards the end of World War II. The M71 high explosive shell was used for indirect fire, or engaging enemy infantry, antitank guns, light vehicles, or other soft targets.

=== Secondary ===
The M36 tank destroyer was equipped with a single .50 caliber (12.7 mm) Browning M2HB machine gun for anti-aircraft or anti-personnel use, with 1,000 rounds of ammunition. Due to the difficulty in firing the .50 caliber machine gun directly to the front, the pintle was often repositioned to the front of the turret, or a .30 caliber (7.62 mm) Browning M1919A4 machine gun mounted there. The M36B1 retained the bow machine gun of the M4A3 Sherman tank, and had 2,000 rounds of ammunition for it. The crew had their personal weapons for self-defense.

== Variants ==
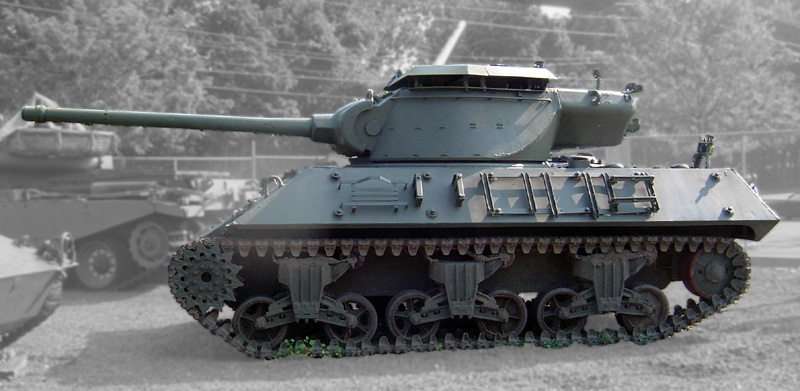
90 mm Gun Motor Carriage M36B2 on display at the former Military Museum of Southern New England in Danbury, Connecticut

90 mm Gun Motor Carriage T71
Prototype 90 mm gun turret on 3-inch GMC M10A1 hull. Turret redesigned and standardized as M36
90 mm Gun Motor Carriage M36
90 mm gun turret on M10A1 GMC hull. 300 built at Grand Blanc from April–July 1944 with 413 at American Loco Co Oct-Dec 1944 and 500 at Massey-Harris June-Dec 1944 by converting M10A1. Montreal Loco Works built 85 in May–June 1945.
90 mm Gun Motor Carriage M36B1
90 mm gun turret on M4A3 Sherman hull and chassis. 187 built at Grand Blanc October–December 1944.
90 mm Gun Motor Carriage M36B2
90 mm gun turret on M10 hull. Armored covers for turret were added to some M36B2s. 237 produced by converting M10s at American Loco in April–May 1945.

== Former operators ==
- Republic of Bosnia and Herzegovina: Bosnian Army used them as part of the Yugoslav Wars
- Croatia: Croatian Army used many during the Croatian War of Independence.
- France: Free French & French Armed Forces Post-war, including use of M36B2 by the Régiment blindé colonial d'Extrême-Orient (RBCEO) in the First Indochina War.
- Iraq: Very few captured from Iran.
- Iran: The Iranian Army used M36, M36B1 and M36B2 during the Iran–Iraq War.
- Italy: The Italian Army had about 36 M36 post-war, from July 1953 to 1956 in the Self-Propelled Anti-Tank (SPAT) Bns of the two armoured divisions, from 1956 to 1961 in two Corps-level SPAT Bns (109th and 110th), and from 1961 to 1975 in some of the SPAT companies attached to the Bersaglieri Regiments.
- Pakistan: Procured around 75 M36B2 Tank Busters in 1956. They were used in the Indo-Pakistani wars of 1965 and 1971. Officially decommissioned after the 1965 war though used in emergency situations during the 1971 war in small numbers.
- Philippines: Philippine Army: Retired in 1960s
- Taiwan: Republic of China Army acquired eight M36B2 in 1955 from France, retired in the early 2000s
- Serbia: Serbian Army used some during the Yugoslav Wars
- Slovenia: Slovenian Army used some during the Ten-Day War
- South Korea: First received in October 1950, around 200 vehicles served in the Army during the Korean War. Retired from active service in 1959 after being replaced by M4A3E8, and was used as fixed artillery.
- Turkey: 222 given by United States.
- United States: US Army Main operator.
- Yugoslavia: Yugoslav Army Passed onto successor states.

== See also ==
- 17pdr SP Achilles
- G-numbers
- M-numbers
- SU-100
- Jagdpanther
- Type 5 Ho-Ri

== Sources ==
- "United States' M36, M36B1, M36B2 Tank Destroyers", World War II Vehicles, Tanks, and Airplanes, www.wwiivehicles.com, archived from the original on 15 December 2007
- Standard Military Motor Vehicles. dated 1 Sept. 1943
- TM9-745 90mm Gun Motor Carriage M36B2, 1945 at archive.org
- TM9-748 90-mm Gun Motor Carriage M36B1, 1945 at archive.org
- TM 9-758 90-mm Gun Motor Carriage T71 (M36 GMC)
- TM 9-374 90MM Gun M3 Mounted in Combat Vehicles at archive.org
- Chamberlain, Peter; Ellis, Chris (1981) [1969], British and American Tanks of World War Two, Arco
- Green, Michael (2014), American Tanks & AFVs of World War II, Oxford: Osprey Publishing, ISBN 9781472829788
- Mesko, Jim (2003), US Tank Destroyers, Walk Around Number 5703, Carrollton: Squadron/Signal, ISBN 0-89747-456-2
- Zaloga, Steven (2002), M10 and M36 Tank Destroyers 1942-1953, New Vanguard 57, Oxford: Osprey Publishing, ISBN 9781841764696
- Yeide, Harry (2007), The Tank Killers: A History of America's World War II Tank Destroyer Force., Drexel Hill: Casemate Publishing
