= 20th Lancers (British Indian Army) =

- Active: 1922 - 1937
- Country: (British Raj) British India
- Branch: British Indian Army
- Size: Regiment
- Engagements: Indian Mutiny of 1857; Bhutan War 1864-65; Second Afghan War 1878-80; First World War 1914-18
- Battle honours: Charasiah, Kabul 1879, Afghanistan 1878-80, Neuve Chapelle, France and Flanders 1914-15, Kut al Amara 1917, Sharqat, Mesopotamia 1916-18, Persia 1916-19, NW Frontier, India 1915.

The 20th Lancers was a regiment of the British Indian Army.

It was formed in 1922 by the amalgamation of the 14th Murray's Jat Lancers and the 15th Lancers (Cureton's Multanis).

== 14th Murray's Jat Lancers ==
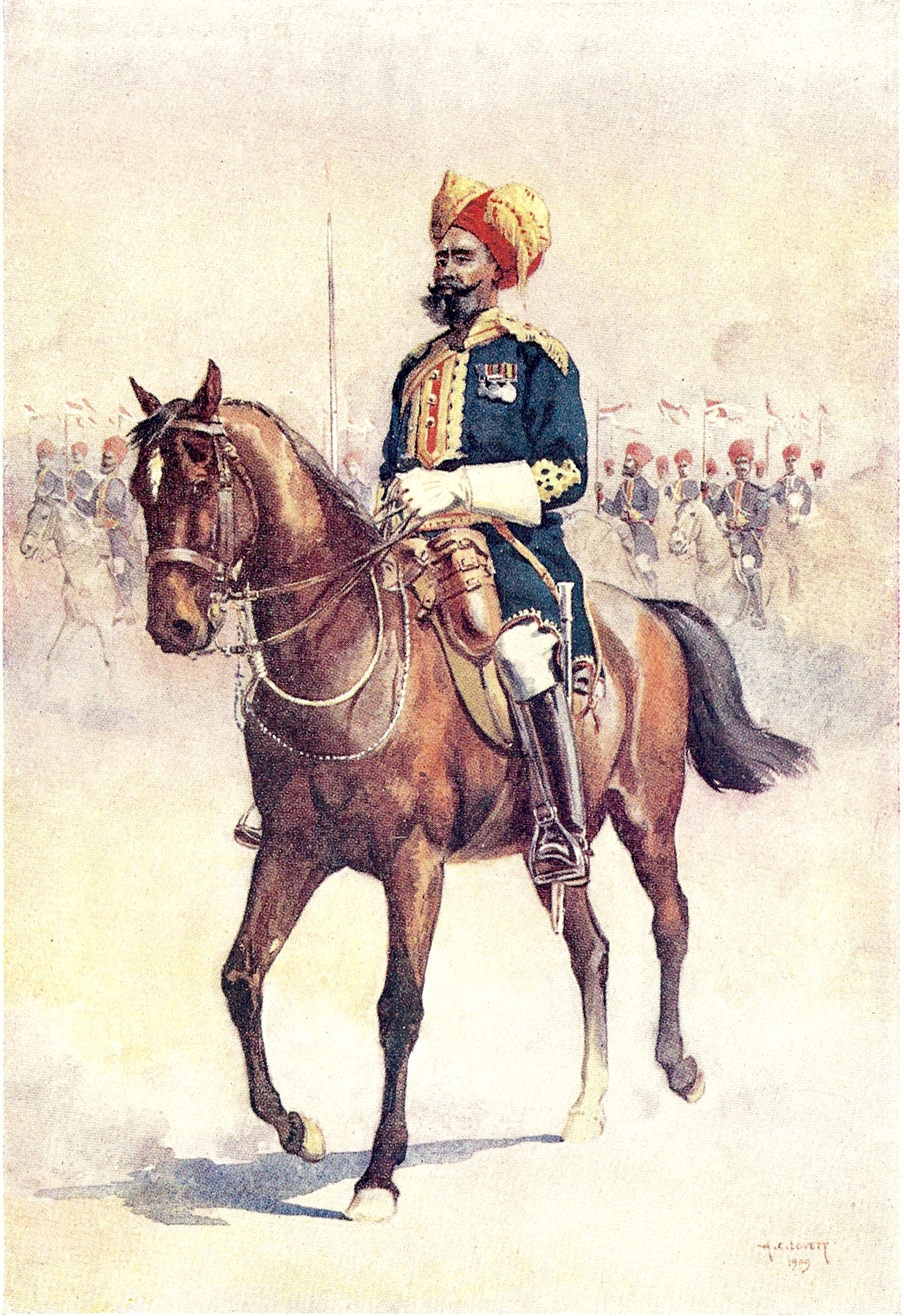
An officer of the 14th Murray's Jat Lancers. Watercolour by AC Lovett, 1910.

The 14th Murray's Jat Lancers was raised at Aligarh as the Jat Horse Yeomanry in 1857 during the Indian Mutiny by Captain J I Murray. It was composed entirely of Hindu Jats. The regiment served as part of the Bhutan Field Force during the Bhutan War of 1864-65 and in the Second Afghan War of 1878-80. During the First World War, the regiment served in Mesopotamia.

1857 Jat Horse Yeomanry
1859 Murray’s Jat Horse
1861 14th Regiment of Bengal Cavalry
1864 14th Regiment of Bengal Cavalry (Lancers)
1874 14th Regiment of Bengal Lancers
1901 14th Bengal Lancers (Murray’s Jat Horse)
1903 14th Murray’s Jat Lancers

== 15th Lancers (Cureton's Multanis) ==
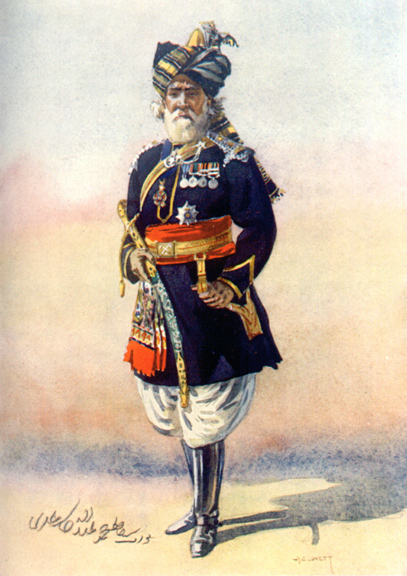
An officer of the 15th Lancers (Cureton's Multanis). Watercolour by AC Lovett, 1910.

The 15th Lancers (Cureton's Multanis) was formed at Lahore in 1858 by Captain C Cureton from six risallahs of Multani Seraiki originally raised in 1857 by Ghulam Hasan Khan as The Multani Regiment of Cavalry. The first native commandant Nawab Ghulam Hassan Khan also served as the British Political Agent to Afghanistan. The regiment was one of the class regiments, comprising 100% Muslims of Multani Seraiki. The regiment saw service in the Second Afghan War of 1878-80 and in France and Persia during the First World War.

1857 Multani Regiment of Cavalry
1860 Cureton's Multani Regiment of Cavalry
1861 15th Regiment of Bengal Cavalry
1871 15th (Cureton's Multani) Regiment of Bengal Cavalry
1890 15th (Cureton's Multani) Regiment of Bengal Lancers
1901 15th (Cureton's Multani) Bengal Lancers
1903 15th Lancers (Cureton's Multanis)

== Formation ==
After the First World War, the number of Indian cavalry regiments was reduced from thirty-nine to twenty-one. However, instead of disbanding the surplus units, it was decided to amalgamate them in pairs. This resulted in renumbering and renaming of the entire cavalry line. The 14th Murray's Jat Lancers and 15th Lancers (Cureton's Multanis) were amalgamated at Sialkot on 21 September 1920 to form 20th Lancers. The new class composition of the regiment was one squadron each of Seraiki, Punjabi Muslims, Jat Sikhs and Hindu Seraiki. The uniform of 20th Lancers was dark blue with scarlet facings. The badge consisted of crossed silver lances bearing pennons with a crown at the intersection above "XX" and a scroll below. The regiment was in the 7th Cavalry Group based at Delhi.

In 1937, when the number of cavalry stations was reduced, 20th Lancers became the training regiment of 3rd Indian Cavalry Group at Lucknow. Its associated regiments were the 6th DCO Lancers, 7th Cavalry, 8th KGV Own, Royal Deccan Lancers (9th Horse), 19th KGO Lancers, and the Central India Horse. A Jat squadron from the Lancers passed to the 6th Lancers. About this time the Indian cavalry began the process of changing from horses to armoured vehicles but the process was slow. The war speeded up the process and the Lancers became part of the new Indian Armoured Corps.

It was converted into a training centre in 1940 and transferred to India after Partition of India.
