= Guy Melfort Baldwin =

British Indian Army general (1865–1945)

Guy Melfort Baldwin DSO
- Born: 22 March 1865
- Died: 22 March 1945 (aged 80)
- Burial place: Yateley, Hampshire
- Military career
- Allegiance: United Kingdom
- Branch: British Army; British Indian Army
- Rank: Brigadier-General
- Units: Royal Irish Regiment; The Loyal North Lancashire Regiment; 4th Punjab Infantry Regiment; Queen Victoria's Own Corps of Guides (Frontier Force); 25th Cavalry (Frontier Force)
- Commands: 25th Cavalry (Frontier Force); Derajat Brigade
- Conflicts: North-West Frontier; Chitral Expedition; First Hazara Expedition; Siege of Malakand; Relief of Chakdara; First World War; Third Anglo-Afghan War
- Awards: Distinguished Service Order

Brigadier-General Guy Melfort Baldwin DSO (22 March 1865 – 22 March 1945) was a British cavalry officer in the British Indian Army where he commanded the 25th Cavalry (Frontier Force) and later the Derajat Brigade and 10th Indian Cavalry Brigade.

== Early life ==
Guy Melfort Baldwin was born 22 March 1865 at Penang, to Colonel A T and Margaret Baldwin. He was educated in Scotland at the Royal High School, in Edinburgh, and then at Wimbledon College.

He then attended the Royal Military College, Sandhurst, graduating as the Queen's India Cadet in January 1886 and joining the Royal Irish Regiment as a second-lieutenant. Until August the same year when he transferred to The Loyal North Lancashire Regiment.

== British Indian Army ==
In March 1888, Baldwin was seconded for service with the Indian Staff Corps, joining the 4th Punjab Infantry Regiment and serving with them in the Hazara Expedition of 1888. Two years later in 1890 he joined the Queen's Own Corps of Guides as a lieutenant and squadron commander. He was present during the 1895 Chitral Expedition, where as part of the relief force he received a sword wound during the action at Khaar 4 April 1895. He was mentioned in dispatches and invested as a Companion of the Distinguished Service Order. He was again wounded in November 1897, this time severely during operations in the Malakand District and Swat valley.

He was promoted to captain in April 1897, and major in February 1904. He held the appointment of a Deputy Assistant Adjutant General on the staff in India from 1 April 1905 to 31 March 1908.

He was promoted Lieutenant Colonel on 30 January 1912, and on 13 July 1913 transferred from the Queen's Own Corps of Guides to the 25th Cavalry (Frontier Force) and was appointed second in command. He was appointed commandant of the 25th Cavalry (Frontier Force) on 5 April 1914.

In August 1914 the 25th Cavalry (Frontier Force) was stationed in Bannu, as part of the Bannu Brigade. On the 29th October 1914 the Bannu Moveable Column was mobilised and marched up the Tochi. A lashkar of Zadrans had been reported as advancing to attack Miranshah post. In March 1915 he took part in the action at Miranshah in the Tochi Valley, and was again mentioned in dispatches and was promoted to brevet colonel in October 1915. as 'a reward for distinguished service in the Field'.

In February 1916, he was promoted to temporary brigadier-general and commander of the Derajat Brigade. For his brigades conduct during the operations undertaken against the Mahsuds during the period March to August, 1917 he was once more mentioned in dispatches.

The Headquarters 10th Indian Cavalry Brigade was formed under 1st (Peshawar) Division in May 1917, and on the 10th May he was appointed commander holding the rank of temporary brigadier-general.

He was promoted substantive Colonel in the London Gazette 19 February 1920 with seniority from 1 Jan 1917. He retired from the army 12 August 1920, being granted the honorary rank of brigadier-general. .

== Family life ==
Baldwin married his wife Christine and lived for a time at Bexhill on Sea in Sussex and at Melfort Cottage, Yateley, in Hampshire. Their son Major Christopher Melfort Baldwin of the 1/7th Battalion, Middlesex Regiment was killed in action 1 June 1940, during the Second World War.
