= Char Asiab =

Chahar Aasiaab چهار آسیاب Chahār Aasiāb
- Location in Afghanistan
- Coordinates: 34°23′55″N 69°10′3″E
- Country: Afghanistan
- Province: Kabul Province
- District: Char Asiab District
- Elevation: 6,047 ft (1,843 m)
- Time zone: UTC+4:30

Char Asiab, Chahar Asiab, Charasiab, Charasiah or Charasia (Persian: چهار آسیاب Chahār Aasiāb) is a town, ca. 11 kilometres (6.8 mi) south of Kabul in the Char Asiab District.

It was the site of the Battle of Charasiab on 6 October 1879 and the Second Battle of Charasiab on 25 April 1880 during the Second Anglo-Afghan War.
