= 4th Cavalry (India) =

- Active: 1838-1922
- Country: India
- Allegiance: Oudh State (1840-1858); East India Company (1840-1858); British India (1858-1922)
- Branch: Oudh State (1838-1840); Bengal Army (1840-1895); British Indian Army (1895-1922)
- Type: Cavalry
- Size: Regiment

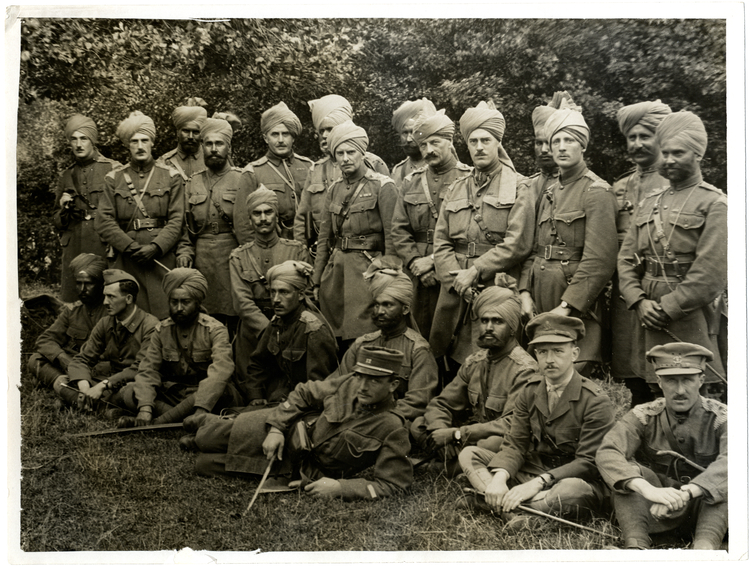
British and Indian officers of the 4th Cavalry in Belgium in 1915

The 4th Cavalry was a cavalry regiment of Awadh (1838-40), the Bengal Army (1838-1895) and the British Indian Army (1895-1922).

== Origin ==
The 4th Cavalry was raised in 1838 in the service of the Nawab of Awadh and underwent numerous reorganisations and amalgamations as listed below.

=== History ===
In 1840, the regiment was converted to the service of the East India Company as the 6th Bengal Irregular Cavalry. The regiment was granted an Honorary Standard for its service in Sind in 1844, wearing the device of a lion 'passant regardant'.

As part of the 1861 reforms it was add to the regular establishment as the 4th Regiment of Bengal Cavalry. The regiment earned its first battle honour "Afghanistan NWF 1879-80" for service during the Second Anglo-Afghan War.

The regiment went through four changes of title between 1900 and 1904, initially owing to the regiment being rearmed with the lance. The regiment was stationed at the Bareilly Cantonment when World War I broke out in 1914.

In August 1914, the regiment was mobilised as the divisional cavalry regiment of the 7th (Meerut) Division, and landed in France in October 1914

In November 1915 they left the front and entrained for Marseille, however they did not sail until the end of December. They were transferred to Mesopotamia, arriving in January 1916. They were transferred to serve with the 6th Indian Cavalry Brigade. They left Mesopotamia and returned to India in late 1917. In late 1920 the 4th Cavalry were sent to Palestine on occupation duties, not returning to Bombay, India until January 1922.

In April 1922, the 4th was amalgamated with the 2nd Lancers (Gardner's Horse) to form the 2nd–4th Cavalry. However this title was short-lived and the new unit was retitled 2nd Lancers (Gardner's Horse) by October 1922.

=== Names ===
- 1837 1st Regiment Oudh Light Auxiliary Force Horse
- 1840 6th Bengal Irregular Cavalry
- 1861 4th Regiment of Bengal Cavalry
- 1900 4th Regiment of Bengal Lancers
- 1901 4th Bengal Lancers
- 1903 4th Lancers
- 1904 4th Cavalry
- 1922 Amalgamated with 2nd Lancers (Gardner's Horse), to initially form 2nd-4th Cavalry then 2nd Lancers (Gardner's Horse)

== See also ==
- 4th Horse (Hodson's Horse), an armoured regiment of the Indian Army
- 4th Cavalry (Pakistan), an armoured regiment of the Pakistan Army

== Bibliography ==
- Kempton, C (1996). A Register of Titles of the Units of the H.E.I.C. & Indian Armies 1666-1947. Bristol: British Empire & Commonwealth Museum. ISBN 978-0-9530174-0-9
- Gaylor, J. (1992). Sons of John Company: The Indian and Pakistan Armies 1903- 1991. Stroud: Spellmount Publishers Ltd. ISBN 978-0-946771-98-1
- Nath, A (2009) Izzat. Historical Records and Iconography of Indian Cavalry Regiments 1750-2007. ISBN 978-81-902097-7-9
- Whitworth, D. E. (1924). History of the 2nd Lancers (Gardner's Horse). London: Sifton Praed & Co Ltd.
- Indian Army List, various dates
