= Edward Locke Elliot =

British Army general (1850–1938)

Lieutenant-General Sir Edward Locke Elliot KCB KCIE DSO
- Elliot in 1925
- Born: 28 January 1850
- Died: 12 December 1938 (aged 88); Nottingham
- Education: Harrow School; Royal Military College, Sandhurst
- Spouse: Eva Sybil Smith (m. 1893)
- Military career
- Allegiance: United Kingdom
- Branch: British Indian Army
- Service years: 1868–1911
- Rank: Lieutenant-general
- Commands: Mobile Cavalry Division; 8th (Lucknow) Division
- Conflicts: Second Anglo-Afghan War; Third Anglo-Burmese War; Anglo-Egyptian conquest of Sudan; Second Boer War; First World War
- Awards: Legion of Honour (France)

Lieutenant-General Sir Edward Locke Elliot KCB KCIE DSO (28 January 1850 – 12 December 1938) was a British Indian Army general during the Second Boer War and in British India.

== Biography ==
Elliot was the son of Colonel Edward King Elliot. He was educated at Harrow School and Royal Military College, Sandhurst, before being commissioned into the 108th (Madras Infantry) Regiment of Foot in January 1868.

He served in the Second Anglo-Afghan War in 1879, and in Burma, 1885–1889, being mentioned in despatches (dated 2 September 1887) and awarded the Distinguished Service Order (DSO).

Elliott participated in the Dongola Expedition of 1896, when he was again mentioned in despatches and after it was appointed a Companion of the Order of the Bath. Two years later, in 1898, he was promoted to colonel and appointed Inspector-General of Cavalry in India.

He served in South Africa for 15 months from 1901 to 1902, after the Second Boer War had changed from conventional warfare to a guerrilla war. During the latter part of the war he commanded troops in the east of the Orange River Colony, and following the announcement of peace on 31 May 1902, he supervised the surrender of arms in that area. For his services in the war he was twice mentioned in despatches (dated 17 June and 23 June), and was created a KCB. He was promoted to Major-General on 1 April 1902.

Following the end of the second Boer war, Elliot returned home to the United Kingdom, but in late 1902 was back in India to take up his former employment as Inspector General of Cavalry.

From 1905 to 1910, he commanded the 8th (Lucknow) Division in India. He retired from the army in 1911, having been promoted to the rank of Lieutenant-General in 1906.

During the First World War he served in France as Military Adviser, Indian Army. He was appointed KCIE in 1919 and also received the Legion d'Honneur.

He died at The Coppice in Nottingham on 12 December 1938.

== Family ==
Elliot married, in 1893, Eva Sybil Smith, eldest daughter of Colonel Percy Smith, by whom he had a daughter.
