= Pakistan Army Armoured Corps =

Pakistan Army's staff corps for mechanized warfare

Pakistan Armoured Corps
- Badge of the Armored Corps
- Active: 1947; 79 years ago
- Country: Pakistan
- Branch: Pakistan Army
- Role: Combat and combined arms administrative and staffing oversight.
- Size: 52 regiments
- HQ/Garrison: Nowshera Cantonment, Khyber-Pakhtunkhwa in Pakistan.
- Nicknames: AC; Men of Steel
- Color identification: Red and Yellow
- Anniversaries: 1947
- Engagements: Military history of Pakistan

Commanders
- Director-General: Maj-Gen. Zafar Iqbal Marwat
- Notable commanders: Lt. Gen. Shah Rafi Alam General Jehangir Karamat; General Shamim Alam Khan; Lt-Gen Nadeem Zaki Manj; Lt-Gen Hameed Gul; Lt-Gen Gul Hassan Khan; Maj-Gen. Bilal Omer Khan

Insignia
- War flag

The Pakistan Army Armoured Corps is a military administrative and combined arms service branch of the Pakistan Army.

Headquartered in Nowshera, Khyber-Pakhtunkhwa in Pakistan, the corps is commanded by its director-general, Major-General Zafar Marwat as of 2023.

== Overview ==
The Pakistan Army's armored corps was commissioned as an administrative corps from one-third of the personnel and assets of the British Indian Army's Indian Armoured Corps– there were six regiments that formed the basis of the Armoured Corps.

During the early years, the British Army officers played a crucial role in running the military operations from the Nowshera Cantonment which remains till this day Armoured Corps' headquarter. Until 1956, the training and field manuals were based on British Army but later adopted U.S. Army's field manual and training, which is continue to be practiced by armoured corps' training school. The School of Armor and Mechanized Warfare trains cadets and officers to be a part of the Armored Corps at the Nowshera Cantonment. The Armored Corps is commanded by the director-general who is usually at two-star active duty rank, Major-General, working directly under the IG Arms at the Army GHQ in Rawalpindi.

The Armoured Corps only has an administrative control over its combat strike brigades and such brigade teams are employed in numbers of strike maneuver corps to defend the national borders of Pakistan from the foreign threats.

Until 2001, the armoured corps was focused towards opposing Indian advances in the east but later stationed its interests in western border to prevent foreign threats coming from Afghanistan.

In 2012, the CIA used satellite imagery to estimate that there were 32 armoured regiments in Pakistan Army, including two armoured reconnaissance regiments. Most of these units were operating near the border with India.

== Regiments in the Corps ==
At the time of independence of the country in August 1947, Pakistan Army inherited six armoured regiments from the British Indian Army, as follows:

Regiment	Nickname	Raised
President's Bodyguard (Pakistan)	PBG	1773
13th Lancers	The Spearhead Regiment	1817
Guides Cavalry	The Guides	1846
11th Cavalry (Frontier Force)	PAVO Cavalry	1849
5th Horse	Probyn’s Horse	1857
6th Lancers	Fateh Khem Karan	1857
19th Lancers	Fane’s Horse	1858
15th Lancers	Baluch Horse	1955
12th Cavalry (Frontier Force)	Sam Browne's Cavalry	1955
4th Cavalry (Pakistan)	The Valiants	1956
20th Lancers	Haideri	1956
22nd Cavalry	Death or Glory	1962
23rd Cavalry	The Tudors	1962
24th Cavalry (Frontier Force)	The Chargers	1962
25th Cavalry	Men of Steel	1962
32nd Cavalry	Conquerers	1964
27th Cavalry	Steeds of War	1965
30th Cavalry	Bold Till Death	1966
31st Cavalry	Sprocketeers	1966
34th Lancers	Dragoons	1999
26th Cavalry	The Mustangs	1968
28th Cavalry	Chamb Hunters	1969
29th Cavalry	Bengal Tigers	1969
33rd Cavalry	Fortunes with the Bold	1971
38th Cavalry	Desert Hawk	1971
39th Cavalry	The Vanguards	1971
51st Lancers	Silver Eagles	1971
52nd Cavalry	Howal Mastan	1972
53rd Cavalry	Golden Eagle	1972
54th Cavalry	Hizbullah	1974
21 Independent Armoured Squadron		1985
55th Cavalry	Adham	1985
56th Cavalry	Raad ul Harb	1985
57th Cavalry	Allāhu ʾakbar	1985
58th Cavalry	Lionhearts	1985
40th Horse	Fars e Sholazan (Blazing Steeds)	1987
41st Horse	Karakash	1987
42nd Lancers	Punjab Lancers	1988
21st Horse	Murtajiz	1990
7th Lancers	Zarrar	1991
8th Cavalry	Izz-Ul-Khail	1991
9th Horse	Arabian Horse	1991
14th Lancers	Zarb-e-Ghazi	1993
16th Horse	Al-Mugheerat	1993
18th Horse	Charging Stallions	1994
17th Lancers	Stalions	1998
37th Cavalry (Pakistan)	Ribat-us-Sehra	
35th Cavalry	AL-MUBARIZUN	2014
36th Cavalry		2015
43rd Cavalry	Al-Zarib	2015
44th Cavalry	Hell on Wheels	2016
45th Horse	Alambardar	
47th Cavalry		

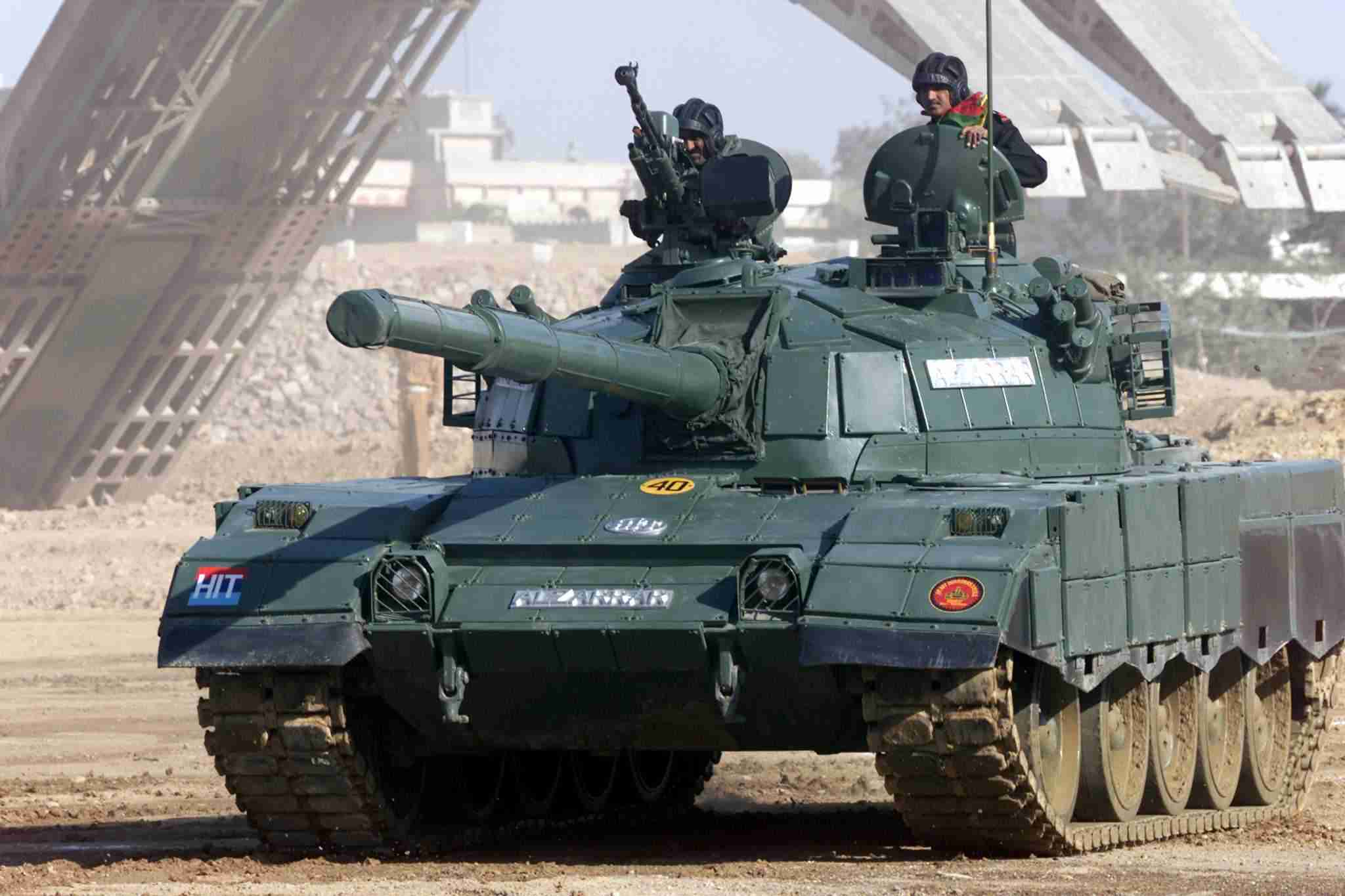
Al-Zarrar Main Battle Tank of the Pakistan Army

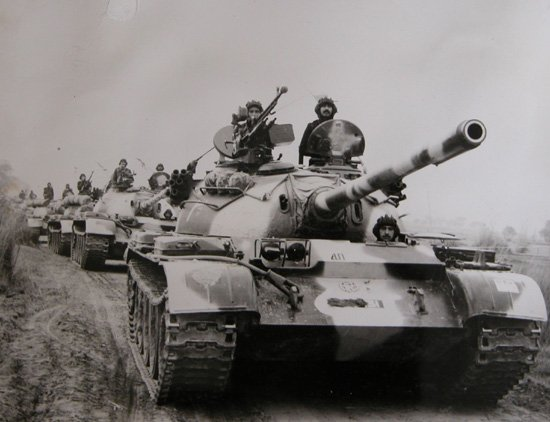
A column of Pakistani Type 59 tanks during the 1971 War. They were acquired in 1966 and were first displayed to the public on 23 March 1966 parade.

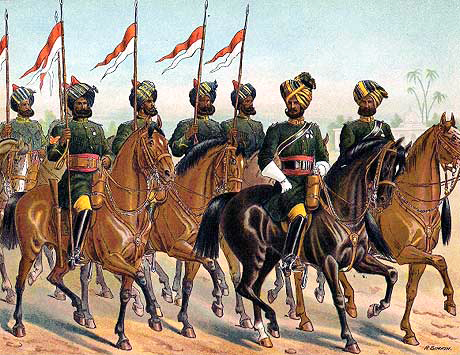
2nd Bombay Lancers (now 13th Lancers). Coloured lithograph by Richard Simkin, 1885.

== Equipment ==
=== Early days ===
During World War II, the British Indian Army received low priority for equipment, and the surplus American tanks and vehicles obtained afterward were mostly outdated. The Indian Armoured Corps operated a mix of obsolete Churchills, Shermans, Stuarts, and armoured cars. This same mix was inherited by the Pakistan Armoured Corps (excluding the Churchill tank), which struggled to keep them operational in the difficult years after independence. After the independence, Pakistan got 135 light armoured vehicles consisting of M3 Stuarts, Humber armoured cars and Daimler armoured cars along with some Universal Carriers, 2 AEC armoured command vehicles and 162 Sherman medium tanks from the division of assets.

=== Current inventory ===
Armoured Corps regiments are equipped with the following:

- The VT4 is a Chinese third-generation MBT specifically made for export.
- The Al-Khalid main battle tank is a joint Sino-Pakistani production with a 125 mm smoothbore gun.
- The T-80UD is of Ukrainian origin with a 125 mm smoothbore gun.
- The Al-Zarrar is a heavily upgraded version of the Chinese Type 59 tank equipped with a 125mm smoothbore cannon, ERA, and many more modern equipment.
- The T-85III is an upgraded version of the Chinese T-85AP with a 125 mm smoothbore gun.
- The Type 69 tank is a Chinese MBT with a 105 mm gun.
- The Haider main battle tank has been designed by using the design of the Chinese VT4.

== See also ==
- 6th Armoured Division (Pakistan)
- Azad Kashmir Regiment
- Baloch Regiment
- Frontier Force Regiment
- Northern Light Infantry Regiment
- Punjab Regiment
- Sindh Regiment
