= 15th Lancers (Cureton's Multanis) =

- Active: 1858–1921
- Country: (British Raj) British India
- Branch: British Indian Army
- Type: Cavalry
- Size: Regiment
- Engagements: Second Afghan War 1878–80; First World War 1914–18

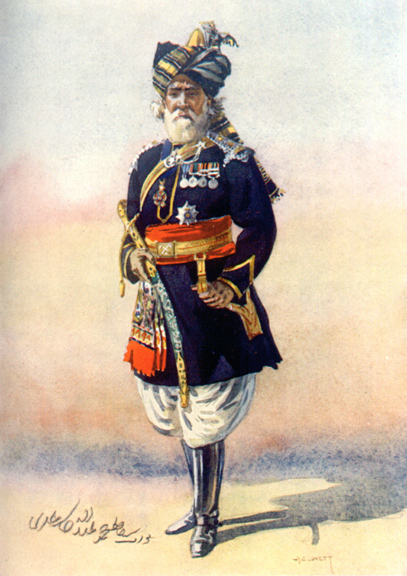
An officer of the 15th Lancers (Cureton's Multanis). Watercolour by AC Lovett, 1910.

The 15th Lancers (Cureton's Multanis) was a cavalry regiment of the British Indian Army which existed from 1858 to 1921. Raised during the 1857 uprising, the regiment later saw service in the Second Afghan War of 1878–80 and the First World War. The regiment was one of the single class regiments, with all troops being recruited from the Punjab.

Cureton's Multanis had a blue uniform with scarlet facings. The badge comprised two crossed lances and a pennon with a star and crescent. The star was placed over the point of crossing of the lances and was inscribed with "XV". The crescent was placed lower down and had the words "CURETON"S MOOLTANEES" inscribed upon it.

The regiment had a tradition of giving a Muslim salute, i.e. salaam, a gesture of obeisance, instead of the regulation military salute. This departure from military regulations was permitted them by the Lord Napier of Magdala.

== Early history ==
During the Second Anglo-Sikh War, risalas of 15th Lancers horsemen had served with Herbert Edwardes and had distinguished themselves in the battles. During the 1857 rebellion, Edwards requested for their service and Ghulam Hasan Khan with 300 horsemen reported for duty and were employed in Peshawar where they helped suppress the rebel sepoys in that district. When peace was restored on the West of the Indus, Khan petitioned for a regiment to be formed. The British agreed to the raising of a risala of 600 sabres and Captain Charles Cureton was placed in command.

Formally instituted in Lahore in 1858 from six risalas from Punjab, it was originally raised in 1857 by Ghulam Hasan Khan as The Multani Regiment of Cavalry. The first native commandant Nawab Ghulam Hassan Khan also served as the British Political Agent to Afghanistan. In 1859 the regiment received men from Khan's Khakwani Risala, from Lind's Multani Horse and from Pathan Horse risalas of Sirdar Mohhamed Afzal Khan, Shahzadeh Sultan Jan Sadozai and Muhamad Tyfoor.

The Multanis saw much action during the 1857 Uprising, mostly vigorous skirmishes including the charge on the cavalry of Prince Firoz Shah, a skilled warrior and cousin of the Mughal Badshah, which has been described as "one of the finest instances of shock action of cavalry which occurred during 1857". However, they were not awarded any battle honour for this conflict.

== World War I ==
At the outset of World War I, 15th Lancers formed the divisional cavalry regiment of 3rd (Lahore) Division. The formation was mobilised on 9 August 1914 and embarked at Karachi and Bombay at the end of the month. The division had a short halt in Egypt following which it embarked for France, finally disembarking in Marseille on 26 September, thus becoming the first British Indian cavalry regiment to land in France. The regiment served at Neuve Chapelle, Aubers, Festubert, in the battle of Loos, at La Bassee, Messines Ridge, Givenchy and in the battle of St Julien.

In 1915, Cureton's Multanis were detached from the Lahore Division and sent to the Middle East. On landing at Basra from Europe, 429 soldiers of Cureton's Multanis refused to fight fellow Muslims, i.e. the Turks, in the Holy Land of Islam but agreed to do so elsewhere. The regiment was later sent to Persia where they carried out patrolling duties in the rugged interiors, engaging in a number of clashes with local tribes. Their primary role was to patrol the East Persia Cordon, meant to prevent the infiltration of German and Turkish agent-provocateurs into Afghanistan. Of the soldiers who refused orders heavy penalties were awarded to 329, which were later commuted except in the case of the ring-leaders. This incident and shortage of suitable reinforcements led to the inclusion of two Jat squadrons in 1916.

== Battle honours ==
The battle honours of Cureton's Multanis are :

- Afghanistan 1878–80
- Neuve Chappelle
- France and Flanders 1914–15
- Persia 1916–19

== Amalgamation ==
In the postwar reduction of cavalry, in 1921, the regiment was amalgamated with the 14th Murray's Jat Lancers at Sialkot to form 20th Lancers. The successor regiment, 20th Lancers, was de-listed in 1937 after being converted into the Indian Armoured Corps Training Centre at Lucknow, which subsequently was allotted to India. Both India and Pakistan re-raised successors to this regiment in 1956.

In 1921, a new 15th Lancers was raised by amalgamating the 17th Cavalry and 37th Lancers which was separate from Cureton's Multanis and did not bear that epithet.

== Changes in designation ==
Cureton's Multanis had the following changes of name :

1857 Independent Risalas of Pathan Horse
1858 Multani Regiment of Cavalry
1860 Cureton's Multani Regiment of Cavalry
1861 15th Regiment of Bengal Cavalry
1871 15th (Cureton's Multani) Regiment of Bengal Cavalry
1890 15th (Cureton's Multani) Regiment of Bengal Lancers
1901 15th (Cureton's Multani) Bengal Lancers
1903 15th Lancers (Cureton's Multanis)
1921 Merged with 14th Murray's Jat Lancers to form 14th/15th Cavalry
1922 20th Lancers
