= Multani (caste) =

Muslim community found in the Gujarat state in India

The Multani are a traditionally nomadic Labana community of Northern India who historically specialised in the transport and trade of grain, silk, diamond and gold. They are Muslim and found in Gujarat and Maharashtra.

Multani surname is also used by some Hindus, Muslims and Sikhs.
