= Indian Army during World War I =

Indian Army
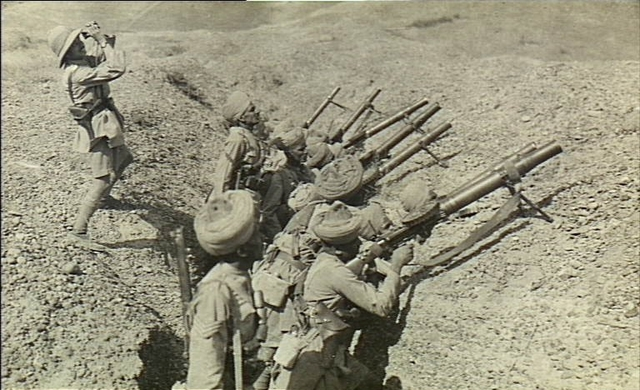
- Indian Red Ensign Indian troops during the Mesopotamian campaign
- Active: 1895–1947
- Country: India
- Allegiance: British Empire
- Type: Army
- Size: 1,780,000
- Engagements: Second Boer War; British expedition to Tibet; World War I Waziristan campaign (1919–20); Waziristan campaign (1936–39); World War II

Commanders
- Notable commanders: Herbert Kitchener, 1st Earl Kitchener

The Indian Army, also called the British Indian Army, was involved in World War I as part of the British Empire. More than one million Indian troops served overseas, of whom more than 60,000 died during the war.

In World War I the Indian Army fought against the German Empire on the Western Front. At the First Battle of Ypres, Khudadad Khan became the first Indian to be awarded a Victoria Cross. Indian divisions were also sent to Egypt, Gallipoli, German East Africa and nearly 700,000 served in Mesopotamia against the Ottoman Empire. While some divisions were sent overseas others had to remain in India guarding the North West Frontier and on internal security and training duties.

Field Marshal Sir Claude Auchinleck, Commander-in-Chief of the Indian Army from 1942, asserted that the British "couldn't have come through both World War I and II if they hadn't had the Indian Army."

== Kitchener's Reforms ==
Herbert Kitchener was appointed Commander-in-Chief, India in 1902 and after five years, his term of office was extended by a further two—during which he reformed the Indian Army. The reforms now directed that there would be only one Indian Army, the three armies of the Presidencies being merged into a unified force. At the same time, the regiments of the Princely states were made available to be called out to become Imperial Service Troops. The British Army also continued to supply units for service in India, in addition to those of the Indian Army. The term Army of India was instituted to refer to the overall command structure which included both the British and Indian Army units. The new formation for the Army of India was set at nine divisions, each division with one cavalry and three infantry brigades and these nine divisions together with three independent infantry brigades would serve in India. The Indian Army was also responsible for supplying a division in Burma and a brigade in Aden.

To assist command and control of the new divisions, two field armies were formed—the Northern Army and the Southern Army. The Northern Army had five divisions and three brigades and was responsible for the North West Frontier to Bengal while the Southern Army, which had four divisions in India and two formations outside the subcontinent, was responsible for Baluchistan to southern India. The regiments and battalions of the new organization would be numbered in a single sequence and the old titles of the Bombay, Madras and the Bengal Armies would be discontinued. The new regiments and battalions, instead of remaining at their home base, could now all be called upon to serve anywhere in the country, and a tour of duty on the North West Frontier would be an established posting. One change that was not accepted was the formation of all-British or all-Indian brigades and the system of having one British regiment or battalion in each brigade remained.

== Organisation ==
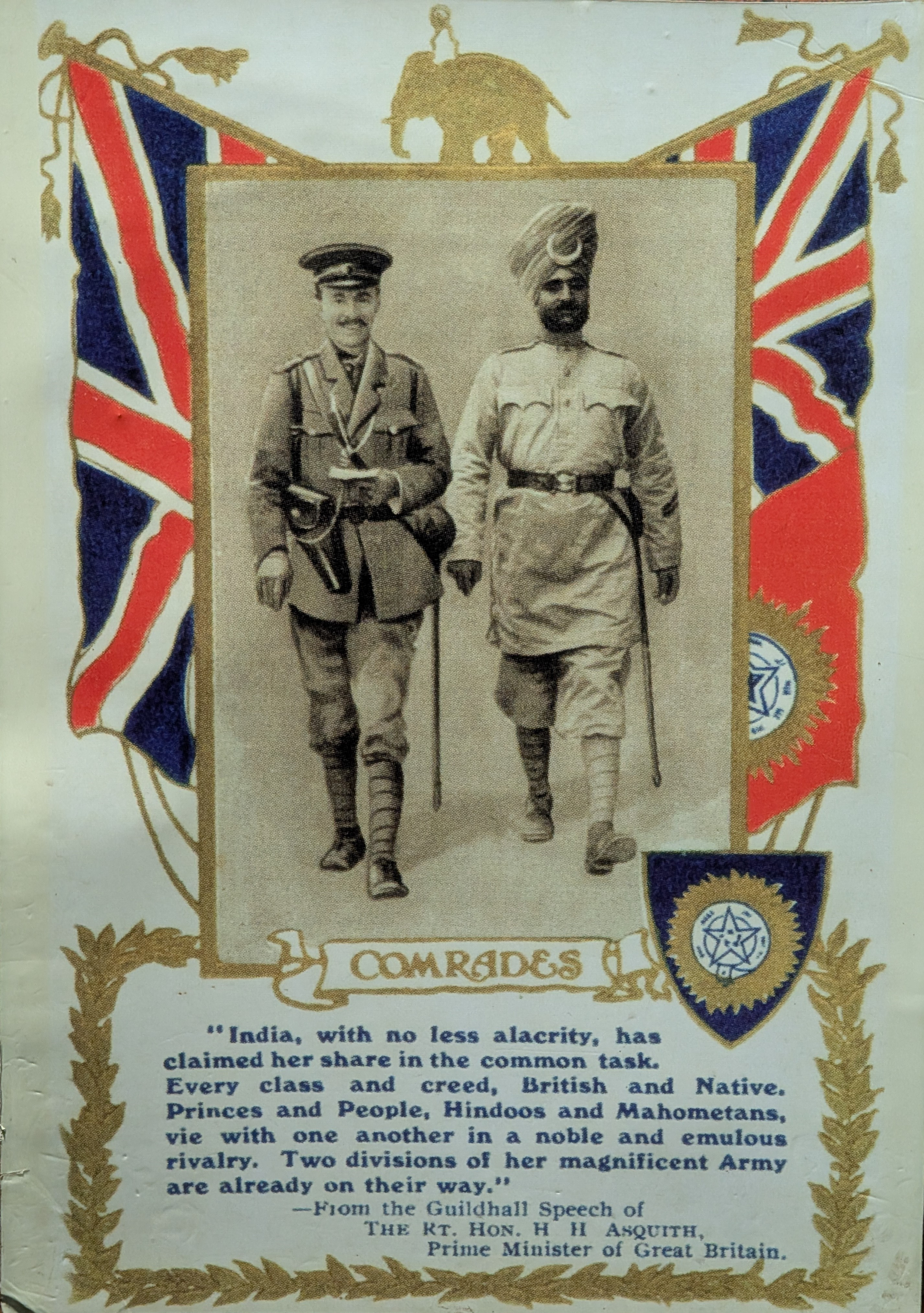
Propaganda postcard

In 1914, the Indian Army was one of the two largest volunteer armies in the world; it had a total strength of 240,000 men, while the British Army had a strength of 247,433 regular volunteers at the outbreak of the war. By November 1918, the Indian Army contained 548,311 men, being considered the Imperial Strategic Reserve. It was regularly called upon to deal with incursions and raids on the North West Frontier and to provide garrison forces for the British Empire in Egypt, Singapore and China.

This field force was divided into two armies: the Northern Army, which stretched from the North-West Frontier to Bengal with five divisions and three brigades under command, and the Southern Army which ranged from Baluchistan to southern India and it in turn had four divisions under command and two formations outside the subcontinent. The two armies contained 39 cavalry regiments, 138 infantry battalions (including 20 Gurkha), a joint cavalry-infantry unit, the Corps of Guides, three sapper regiments and 12 mountain artillery batteries.

The nine divisions formed by these reforms each consisted of one cavalry and three infantry brigades. The cavalry brigade had one British and two Indian regiments while the infantry brigades consisted of one British and three Indian battalions. Indian Army battalions were smaller than the British battalions, consisting of 30 officers and 723 other ranks as compared to the British 29 officers and 977 other ranks. Indian battalions were often segregated, with companies of different tribes, castes or religions. Additional troops attached to the headquarters of each division included a cavalry regiment, a pioneer battalion and artillery provided by the British Royal Field Artillery. Each division had about 13,000 men on strength, somewhat weaker than a British division in part due to the smaller infantry battalions and smaller artillery forces. The Indian Army was also weakened when 500 British officers on home leave, enough to officer 38 Indian battalions, were posted to the new British divisions being formed for Kitchener's Army.

In addition to the regular Indian Army, the armies of the Princely States and regiments of the Auxiliary Force (European volunteers) could also be called upon to assist in an emergency. The Princely States formed the Imperial Service Brigades and in 1914, had 22,613 men in 20 cavalry regiments and 14 infantry battalions. By the end of the war 26,000 men had served overseas on Imperial Service. The Auxiliary force could field another 40,000 men in 11 regiments of horse and 42 volunteer infantry battalions. Also available were the Frontier Militia and the Military Police which could field 34,000 men between them.

The field force headquarters was located in Delhi and the senior officer (Commander-in-Chief, India) was assisted by a Chief of the General Staff, India. All the senior command and staff positions in the Indian Army alternated between senior officers of the British and Indian Armies. In 1914, the Commander–in–Chief was General Sir Beauchamp Duff of the Indian Army, and the Chief of the General Staff was Lieutenant General Sir Percy Lake of the British Army. Each Indian battalion was staffed by 13 officers from the British Army in India and 17 officers from the Indian Army— expatriate British officers serving under colonial Indian administration. As the war intensified and officer casualties mounted, the ability to replace casualties with officers of British origin became extremely difficult and in many cases the officer allotment to battalions was reduced accordingly. Only in 1919 were the first Officer Cadets of Indian descent permitted to be selected for officer training at the Royal Military College.

The normal annual recruitment for the Indian army was 15,000 men, during the course of the war over 800,000 men volunteered for the army and more than 400,000 volunteered for non-combatant roles. In total almost 1.3 million men had volunteered for service by 1918. Over one million Indian troops served overseas during the war. In total, at least 74,187 Indian soldiers died in World War I. Child soldiers, some as young as 10 years old, were enlisted to fight in the war.

== Home service ==
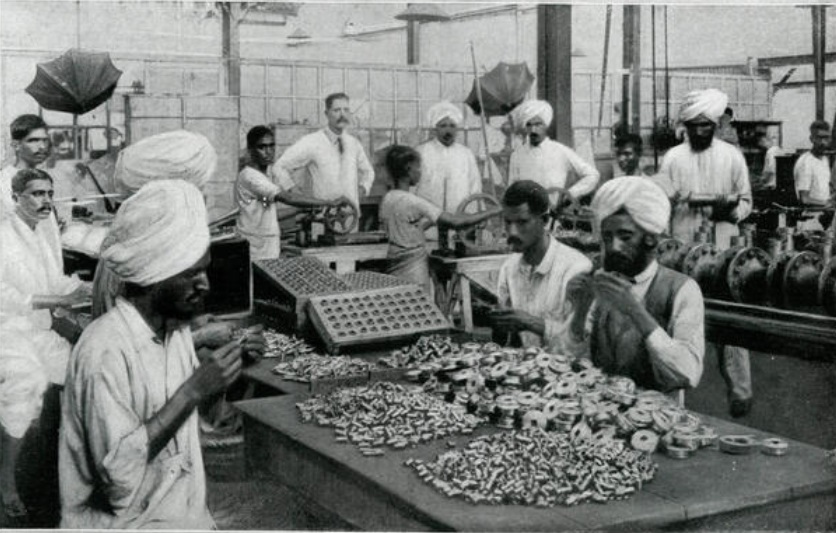
Indians making munitions on the Home Front in 1915

Before World War I, the Indian Army was deployed maintaining internal security and defending the North West Frontier against incursions from Afghanistan. These tasks did not end with the declaration of war. The divisions deployed along the frontier were the existing 1st (Peshawar) Division, the 2nd (Rawalpindi) Division, the 4th (Quetta) Division. The only war-formed division to serve in India was the 16th Indian Division formed in 1916, it was also stationed on the North West Frontier. (Note: The 3rd Lahore, 6th Poona, and 7th Meerut Divisional Areas also remained in India throughout the war.) All these divisions were still in place and took part in the Third Afghan War at the end of World War I.

In supporting the war effort, India was left vulnerable to hostile action from Afghanistan. A Turco-German mission arrived in Kabul in October 1915, with obvious strategic purpose. Habibullah Khan abided by his treaty obligations and maintained Afghanistan's neutrality, in the face of internal opposition from factions keen to side with the Ottoman Sultan. Despite this, localised actions along the frontier still took place and included Operations in the Tochi (1914–15), Operations against the Mohmands, Bunerwals and Swatis (1915), Kalat Operations (1915–16), Mohmand Blockade (1916–17), Operations against the Mahsuds (1917) and Operations against the Marri and Khetran tribes (1918).

On the North East Frontier between India and Burma punitive actions were carried out against the Kachins tribes between December 1914 – February 1915, by the Burma Military Police supported by the 1/7th Gurkha Rifles and the 64th Pioneers. Between November 1917 – March 1919, operations were carried out against the Kuki tribes by auxiliary units of the Assam Rifles and the Burma Military Police (BMP).

The other divisions remaining in India at first on internal security and then as training divisions were the 5th (Mhow) Division, the 8th (Lucknow) Division and the 9th (Secunderabad) Division. Over the course of the war these divisions lost brigades to other formations on active service; The 5th (Mhow) Division lost the 5th (Mhow) Cavalry Brigade to the 2nd Indian Cavalry Division. The 8th (Lucknow) Division lost the 8th (Lucknow) Cavalry Brigade to the 1st Indian Cavalry Division and the 22nd (Lucknow) Brigade to the 11th Indian Division. The 9th (Secunderabad) Division lost the 9th (Secunderabad) Cavalry Brigade to the 2nd Indian Cavalry Division and the 27th (Bangalore) Brigade which was sent to British East Africa. The other pre war units the Burma Division, remained in Burma throughout the war on internal security duties, likewise the Aden brigade remained in Aden.

== Indian Army entry into the war ==
In 1901 oil had been discovered in commercial quantities at Masjid-e-Suleiman at the head of the Persian Gulf. At the start of the war in 1914, the privately owned Anglo-Persian Oil Company which owned the concessions for these fields was about to be bought by the British Government, primarily to fuel the British Fleet. It soon became clear that the Ottoman Turkish Army was being mobilised and in August the Indian Government was instructed to prepare contingency plans to protect these strategic assets. The plans dictated that in the event of the Turkish Army coming out in support of the Germans, the Indian Army was to act to secure the oilfields. As a contingency, the Indian Expeditionary Force D (see below) under command of Lieutenant-General Sir Arthur Barrett sailed from Bombay on 16 October 1914 for Bahrain. They, together with Expeditionary Force A who had been hurriedly sent to Europe at the end of September.

== Independent brigades ==
In addition to the permanent divisions, the Indian Army also formed a number of independent brigades. As part of the Southern Army the Aden Brigade was stationed in the Aden Protectorate on the strategically important naval route from Europe to India, where there was limited fighting. The Bannu Brigade, the Derajat Brigade and the Kohat Brigade were all part of the Northern Army and they were deployed along the North West Frontier. On 12 May 1918, the Bannu and Derajat brigades were designated as the Waziristan Field Force under the command General G W Baynon. The South Persia Brigade was formed in 1915 at the start of the Persian Campaign to protect the Anglo–Persian oil installations in south Persia and the Persian Gulf.

== Expeditionary Forces ==
The Indian Army formed and dispatched seven expeditionary forces overseas during World War I.

=== Indian Expeditionary Force A ===
On the outbreak of war, the Indian Army had 150,000 trained men and the Indian Government offered the services of two cavalry and two infantry divisions for service overseas. The force known as Indian Expeditionary Force A was under the command of General Sir James Willcocks. Force A was attached to the British Expeditionary Force and the four divisions were formed into two army corps: an infantry Indian Corps and the Indian Cavalry Corps.

Upon arrival in Marseille on 30 September 1914, only six weeks after the declaration of war, they were moved to the Ypres Salient and took part in the Battle of La Bassée in October 1914. In March 1915, the 7th (Meerut) Division was chosen to lead the assault in the Battle of Neuve Chapelle. The Expeditionary Force was hampered by a lack of familiarity with new equipment, only being issued Lee–Enfield rifles on their arrival in France and they had almost no artillery, relying on support from their neighbouring corps when in the front line. They were not accustomed to the continental weather and were poorly equipped to resist the cold, leading to low morale which was further compounded by the reserve system, whereby reinforcements were drafted in from any regiment and had no affiliation to their new units. Officer casualties were even more of a handicap, as replacements were unfamiliar with the Indian Army and could not speak the language. With morale low, many soldiers fled the scene of the battle and the infantry divisions were finally withdrawn to Mesopotamia in October 1915, when they were replaced by the new British divisions of Kitchener's Army.

With the withdrawal of the infantry divisions, the only Indian Army units on the Western Front were the two cavalry divisions. In November 1916, the two Indian cavalry divisions were renumbered from 1st and 2nd to the 4th and 5th Cavalry Divisions. Serving alongside British cavalry divisions they were held behind the front line awaiting the hoped for breakthrough. At times during the war they served in the trenches as infantry, each cavalry brigade when dismounted formed a dismounted regiment. This meant that when the divisions went into the front line, they could only cover a brigade area. Before being themselves withdrawn to Egypt in March 1918, they took part in the Battle of the Somme, the Battle of Bazentin, the Battle of Flers-Courcelette, the advance to the Hindenburg Line and finally the Battle of Cambrai.

Of the 130,000 Indians who served in France and Belgium, almost 9,000 died.

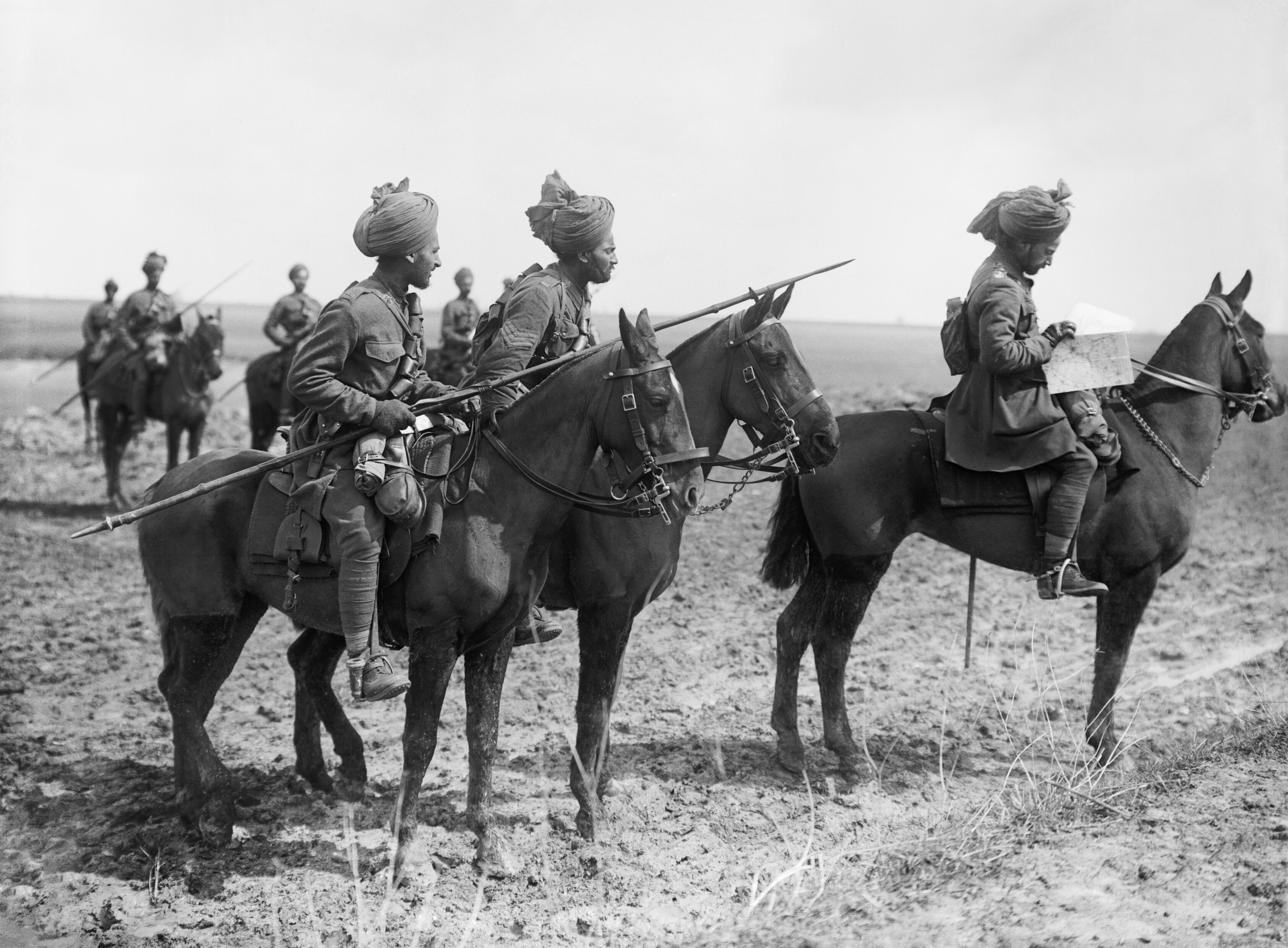
Indian Cavalry on the Western Front

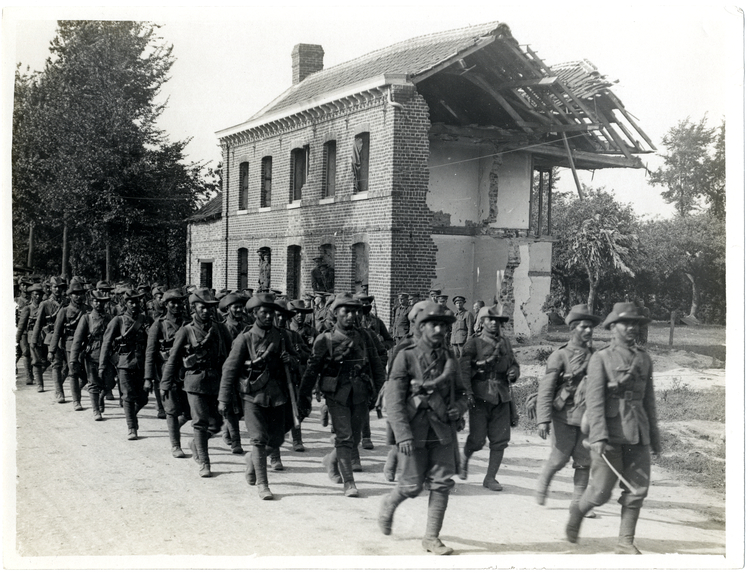
39th Garhwal Rifles march in France

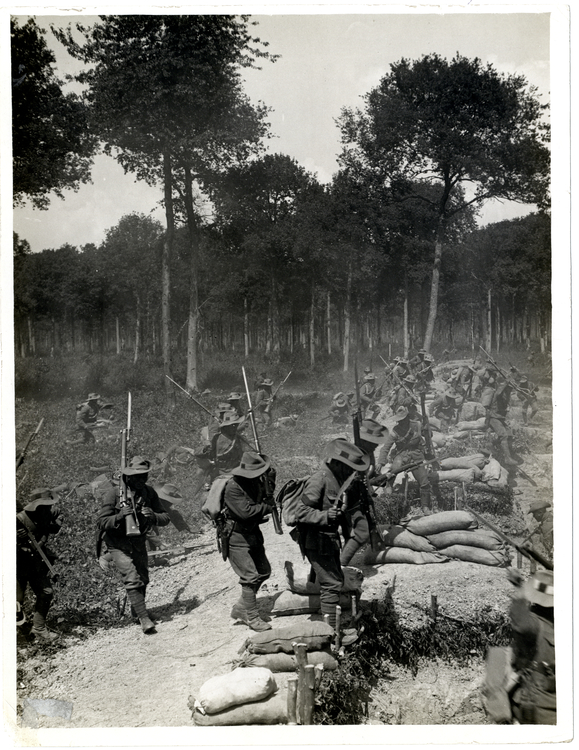
1st Gorkha Rifles charge trench near Merville, France

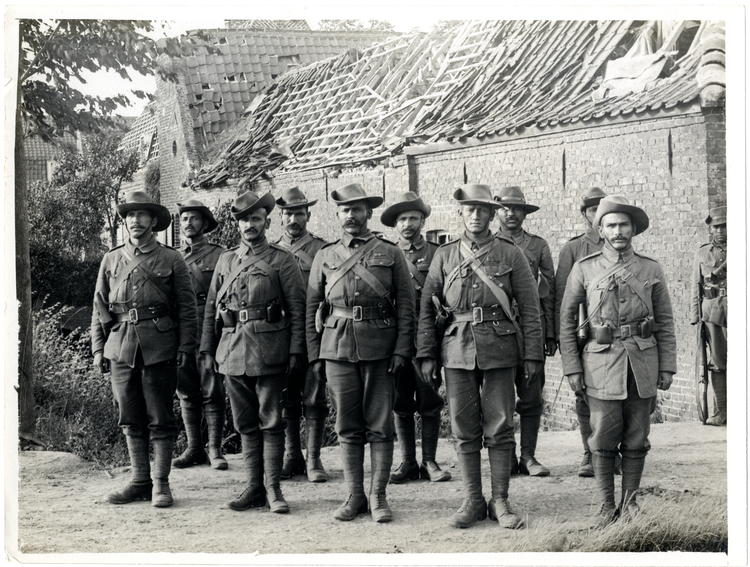
Indian officers of 39th Garhwal Rifles on Estaire La Bassée Road, France

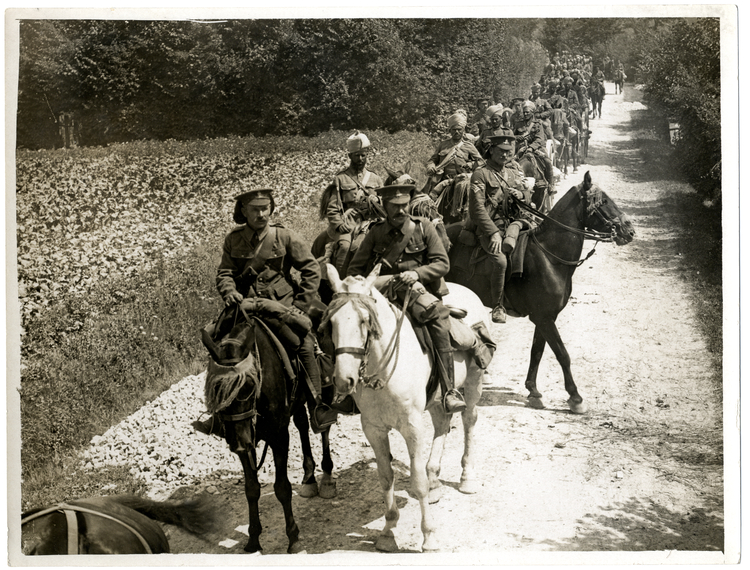
Meerut Cavalry Brigade marches near Fenges, France

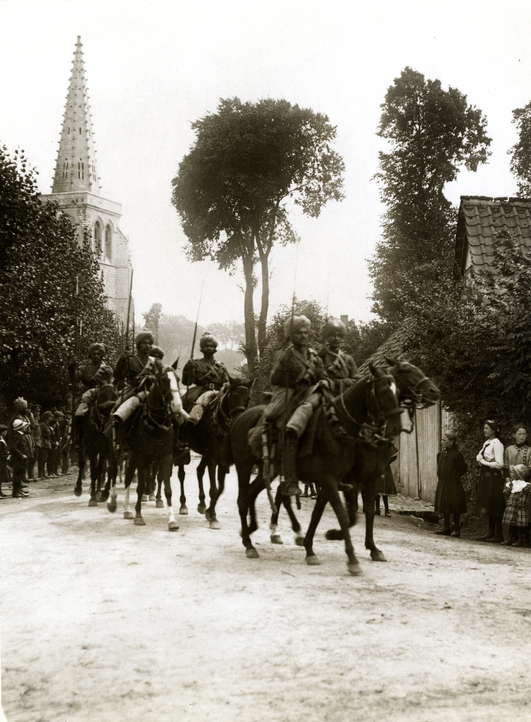
Indian Cavalry marches through Estrée-Blanche

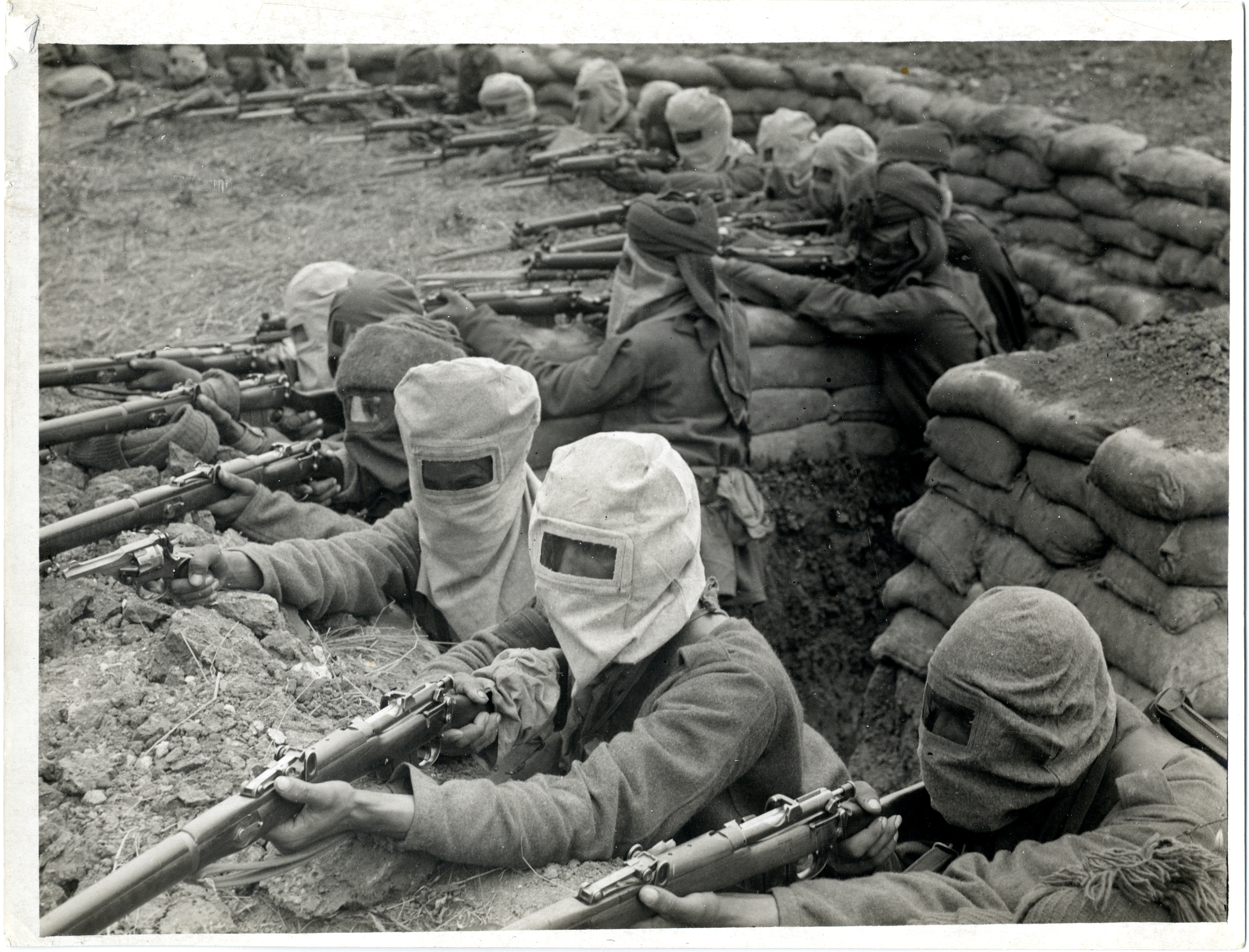
Indian infantry with gas masks in trenches near Fauquissart

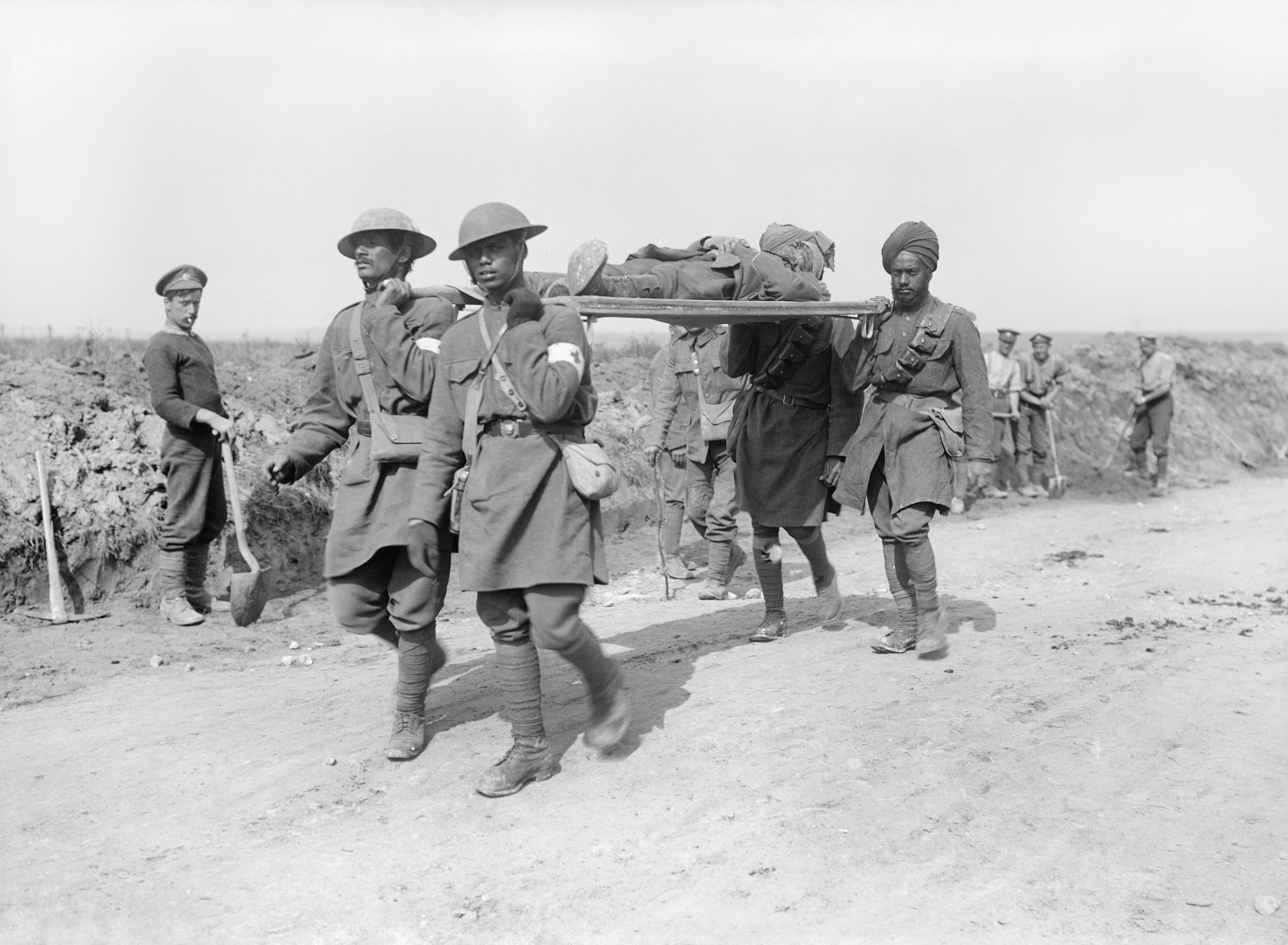
Indian soldiers evacuate wounded officer on stretcher near Ginchy

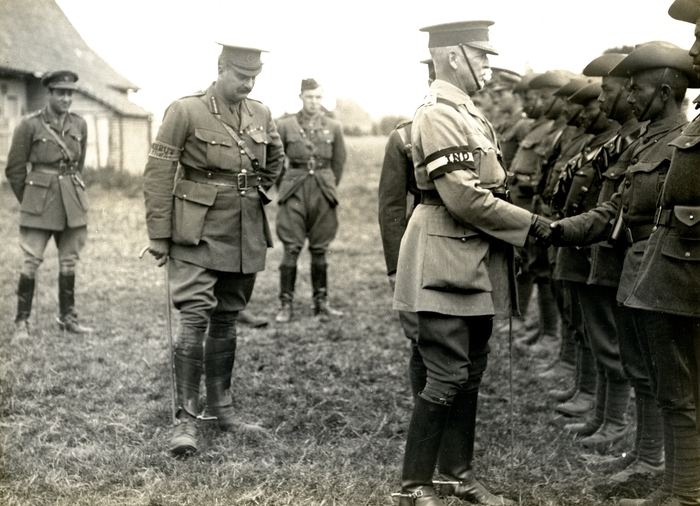
General Sir James Willcocks meets Indian officers near Merville, France

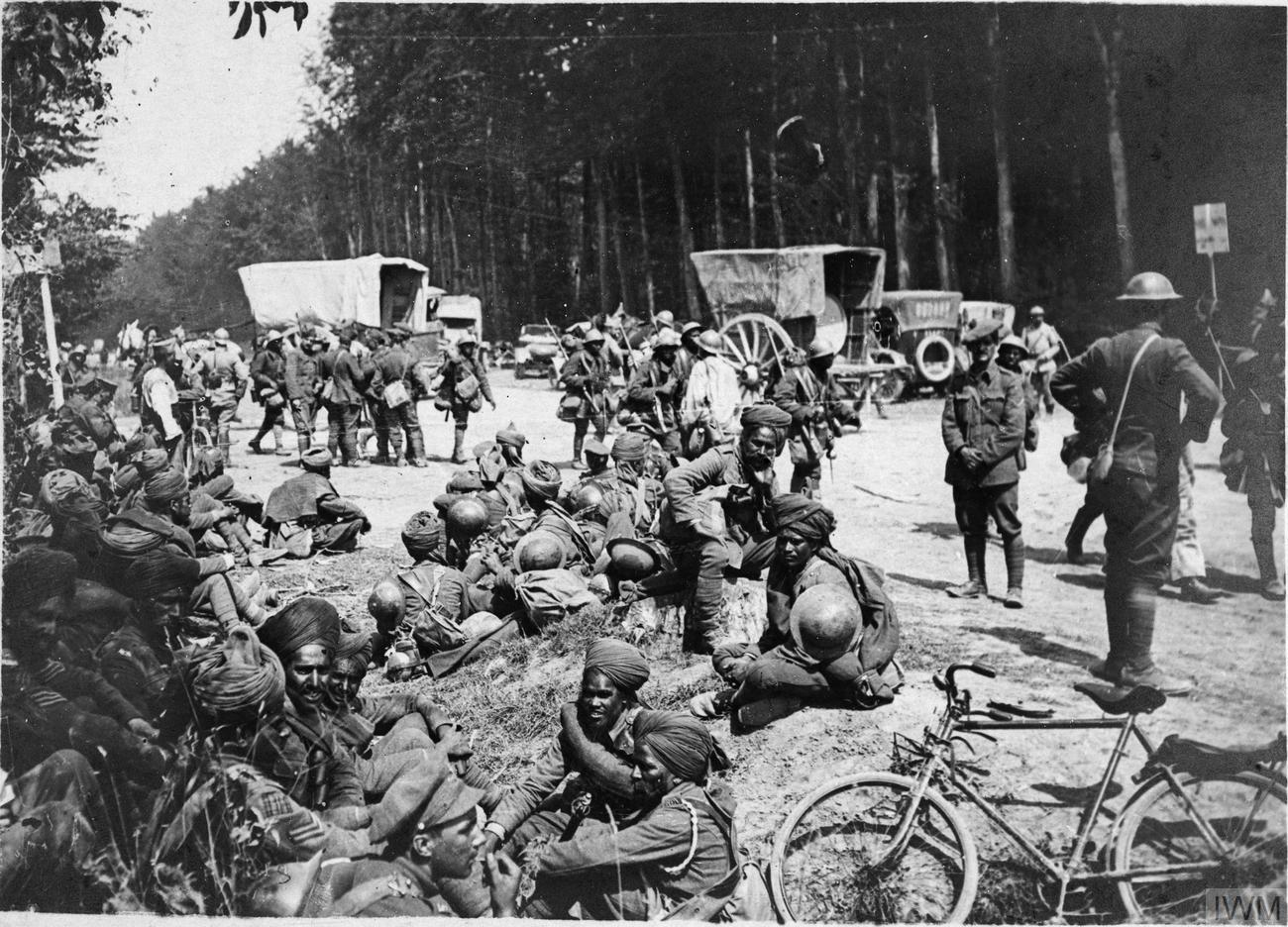
Indian troops en route to relieve French and American units in the German spring offensive

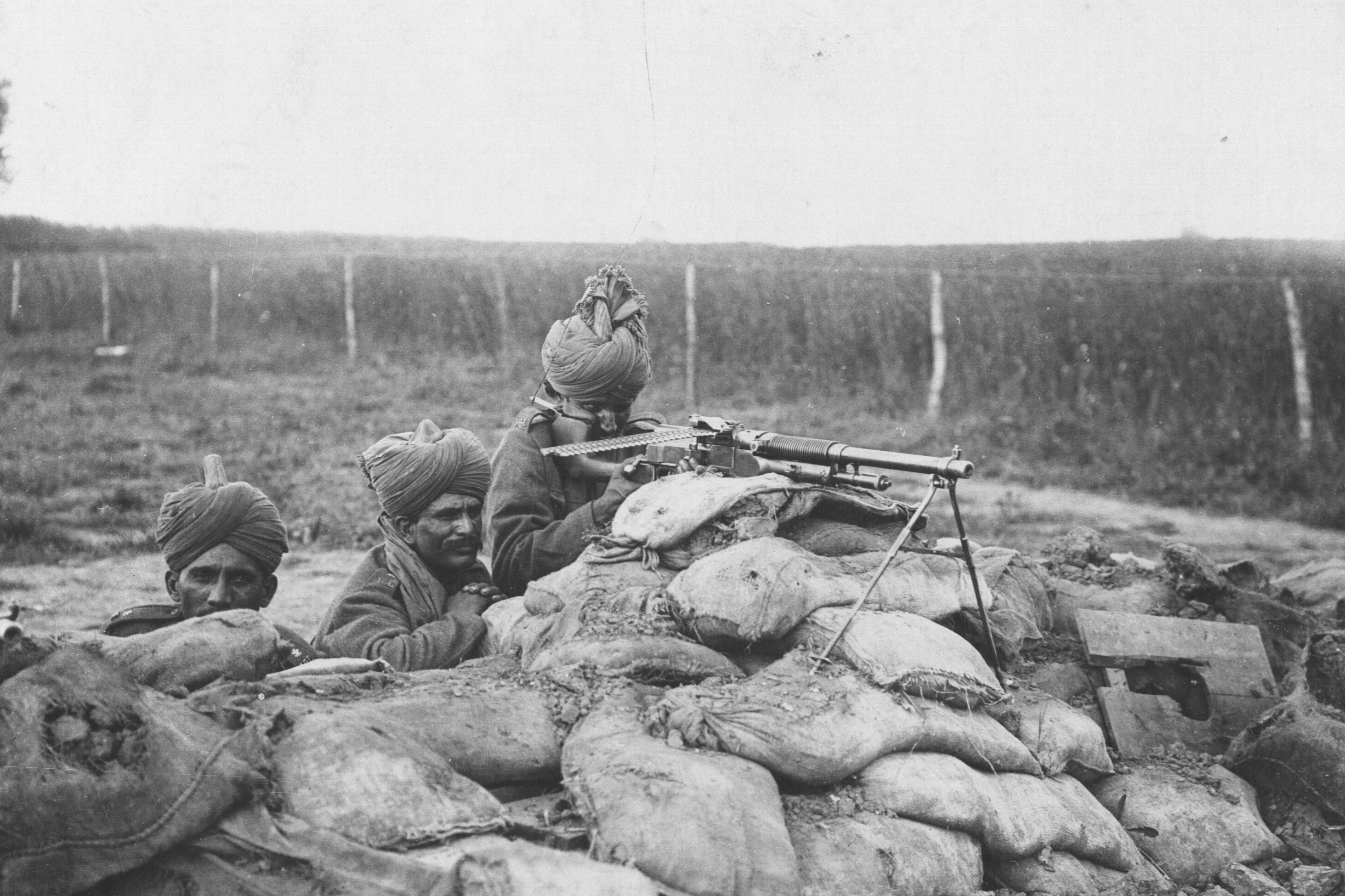
2nd Rajput Light Infantry in action in Flanders

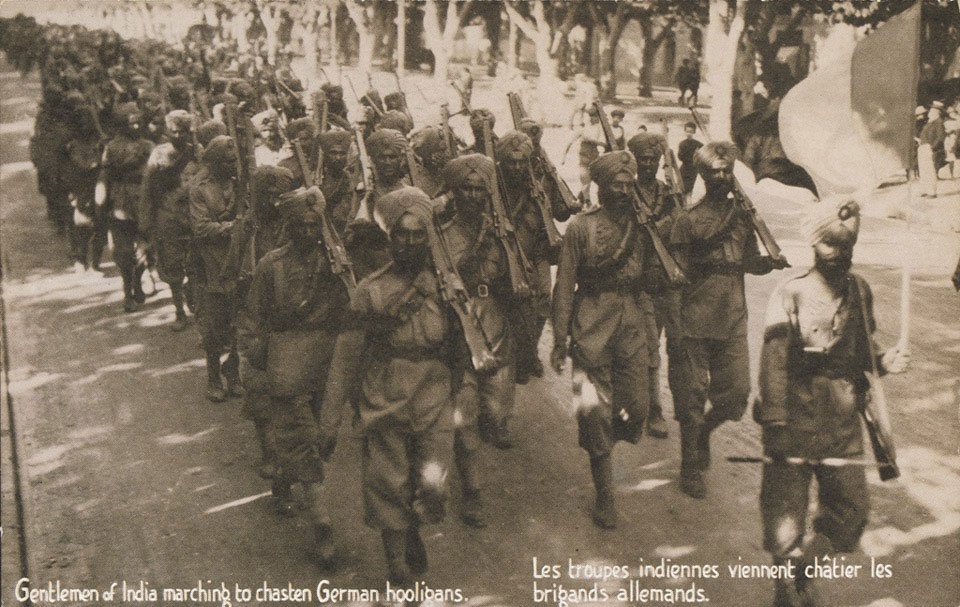
15th Sikhs in Marseille on their way to fight the Germans

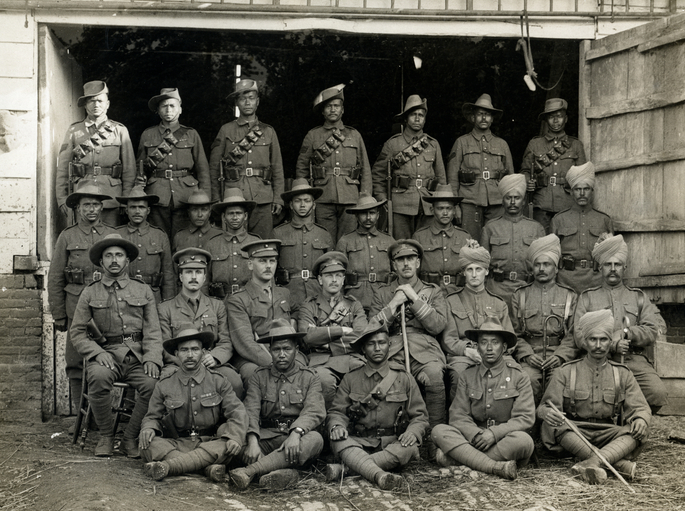
2/2 Gurkhas, 9th Gorkhas and 6th Jats who received honours or were mentioned in dispatches, Saint-Floris

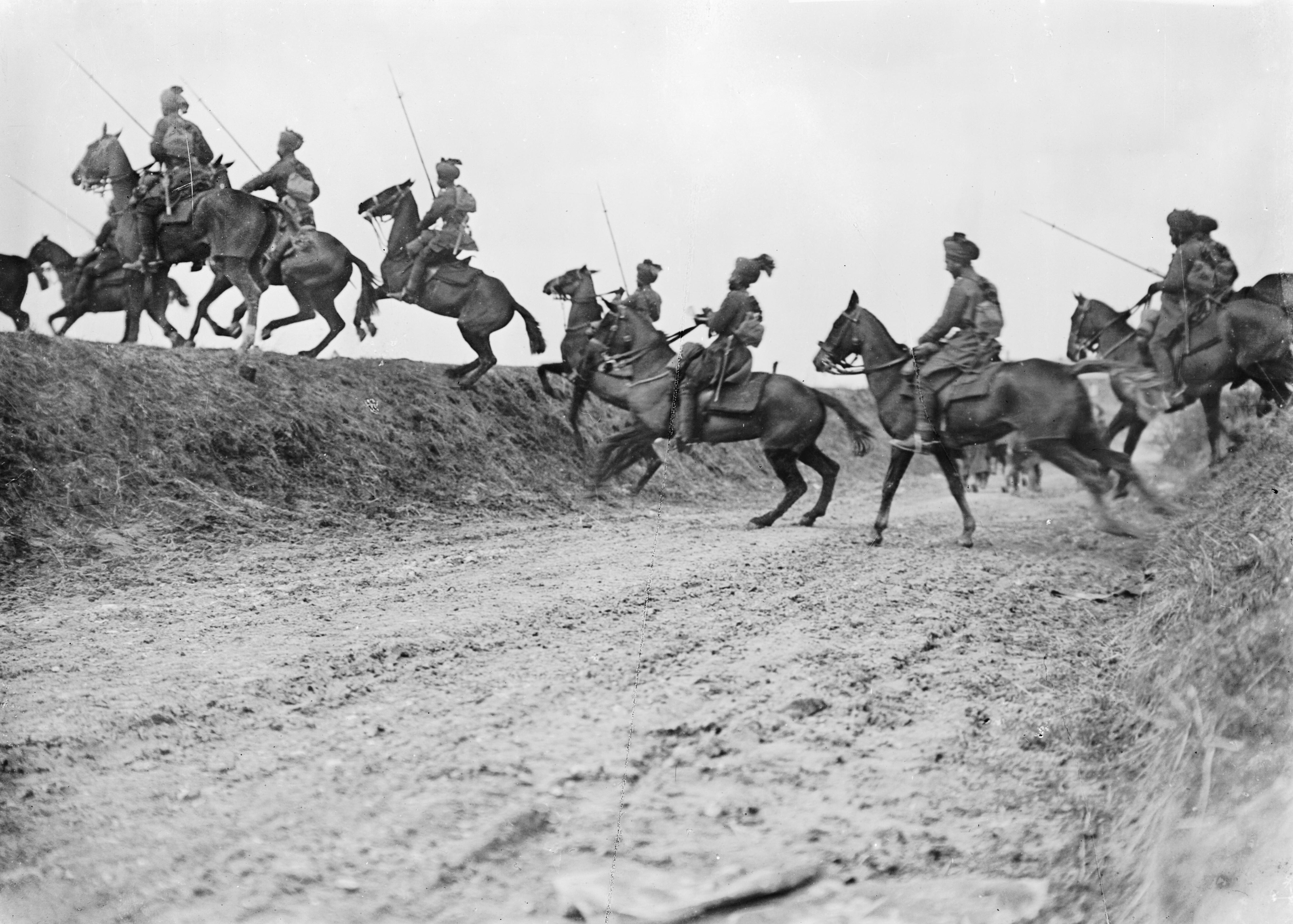
9th Hodson's Horse charge near Vraignes

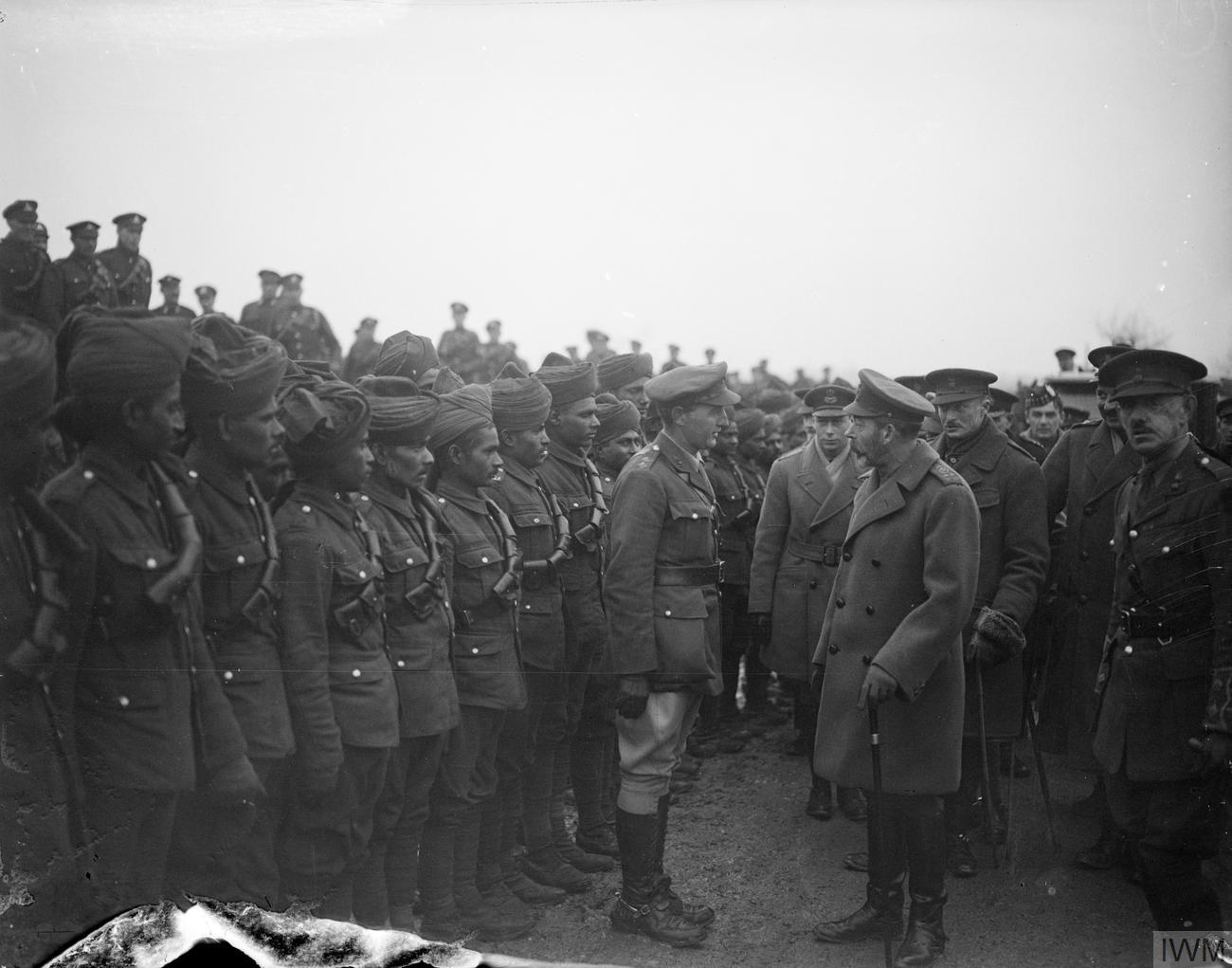
King George V inspects Indian troops at Le Cateau

=== Indian Expeditionary Force B ===
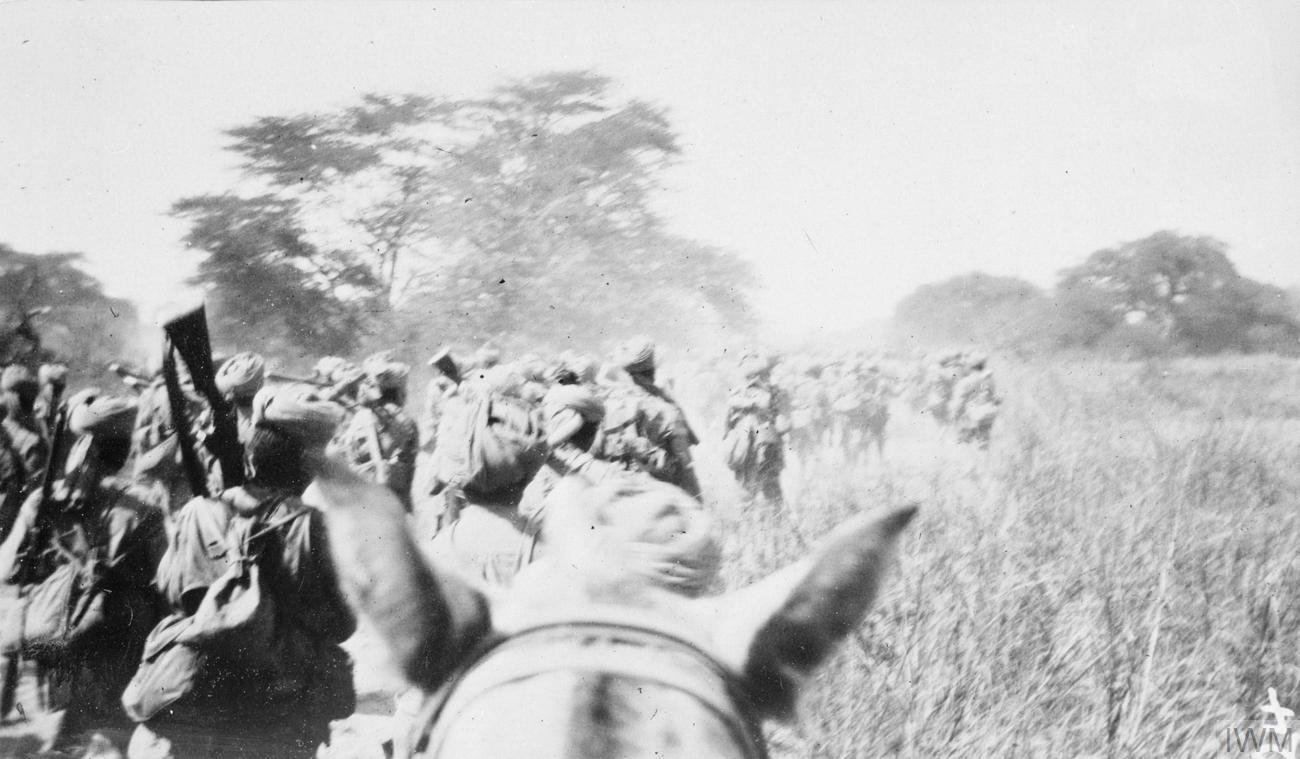
2nd Kashmir Rifles march toward Buiko, German East Africa

In 1914, the Governor of British East Africa requested assistance to deal with the German forces in German East Africa and the problem was handed to the India Office, which assembled two forces and shipped them to his aid. Indian Expeditionary Force B consisted of the 27th (Bangalore) Brigade, commanded by Brigadier General Richard Wapshare, from the 9th (Secunderabad) Division, and an Imperial Service Infantry Brigade, commanded by Brigadier General Michael Tighe, together with a pioneer battalion, a mountain artillery battery and engineers. It was shipped across the Indian Ocean to invade German East Africa. The force under the command of Major General Arthur Aitken landed at Tanga on 2–3 November 1914. In the following Battle of Tanga, Aitken's 9,000 men were badly beaten by the 1,000 men under their German commander Paul von Lettow-Vorbeck. The force re-embarked on 5 November 1914, having suffered 4,240 casualties and the loss of several hundred rifles, 16 machine guns and 600,000 rounds of ammunition.

=== Indian Expeditionary Force C ===
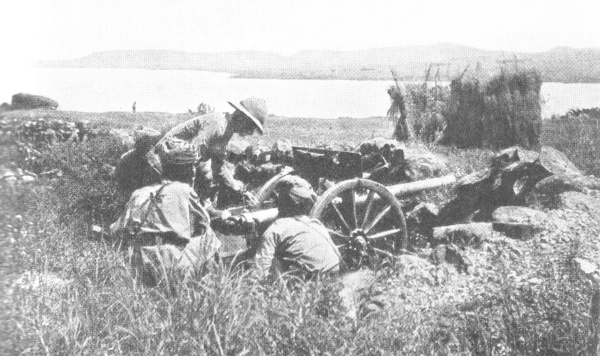
Indian 10-Pounder Mountain Gun crew in German East Africa

Indian Expeditionary Force C was the second force assembled for service in British East Africa in 1914. This force was formed from the Indian Army's 29th Punjabis, together with half battalions from the Princely states of Jind, Bharatpur, Kapurthala and Rampur, a volunteer 15 pounder artillery battery, 22nd (Derajat) Mountain Battery (Frontier Force), a volunteer maxim gun battery and a Field Ambulance. It was planned that the force was to be a defensive one (unlike force B) and be primarily used to guard the railway to Uganda and to support the King's African Rifles in communications protection duties. After arriving in Mombasa, Force C was broken up and its units subsequently served separately. The one action they were involved in was the Battle of Kilimanjaro, in October 1914. Force C with 4,000 men gathered near the border of British and German East Africa, commanded by Brigadier General J. M. Stewart. Flawed intelligence reports estimated the German military presence in the region at 200 men; however, there were 600 askaris in three companies plus the colonial volunteers, 86 young Germans on horseback. On 3 November 1914, some 1,500 Punjabis of the British force advanced up the slope at night near Longido were caught in the crossfire of a strong German defensive position as they advanced in the morning fog. The large force of Indian infantry effectively resisted counterattacks, however, during the day the British attackers made no headway and suffered substantial casualties. By mid-morning, a German mounted patrol ambushed a supply column and roughly 100 mules carrying water for the troops were stampeded away by the Germans. The British officers, with their now widely scattered troops, waited until darkness and having determined their situation to be untenable, withdrew down the mountain and marched back to British East Africa having accomplished nothing.

=== Indian Expeditionary Force D ===
The largest Indian Army force to serve abroad was the Indian Expeditionary Force D in Mesopotamia, under the command of Lieutenant-General Sir John Nixon. The first unit sent in November 1914, was the 6th (Poona) Division and they were tasked with guarding British oil installations in and around Basra. As part of the Mesopotamian campaign they served under the command of Major General Barrett and then under Major General Townshend. After a string of early successes, the campaign was delivered a setback at the Battle of Ctesiphon in November 1915 due to logistical constraints. Following this engagement, the Poona Division withdrew back to Kut, where Townshend made the decision to hold the city and the Siege of Kut began.

Between January and March 1916, Townshend launched several attacks in an attempt to lift the siege. In sequence, the attacks took place at the Battle of Sheikh Sa'ad, the Battle of the Wadi, the Battle of Hanna, and the Battle of Dujaila Redoubt. These attempts to break through the encirclement did not succeed and the cost was heavy with both sides suffering high casualties. In February food, and hopes were running out for Townshend in Kut-al-Amara. Disease spread rapidly and could not be contained or cured and Townshend surrendered in April 1916. In December 1916, the 3rd and 7th Divisions arrived from the Western Front.

In 1917, the British force, under Frederick Stanley Maude, which now included one cavalry and seven infantry divisions from the Indian Army, in the III Corps (India) advanced towards Baghdad which was captured in March. The advance continued in 1918, and after the Battle of Sharqat in October, the Turkish forces surrendered and the Armistice of Mudros was signed. The Mesopotamian campaign was largely an Indian Army campaign as the only British formations involved were the 13th (Western) Division and British battalions assigned to Indian brigades. In the campaign, 11,012 were killed, 3,985 died of wounds, 12,678 died of disease, 13,492 were either missing or prisoners (including the 9,000 prisoners from Kut), and 51,836 were wounded.

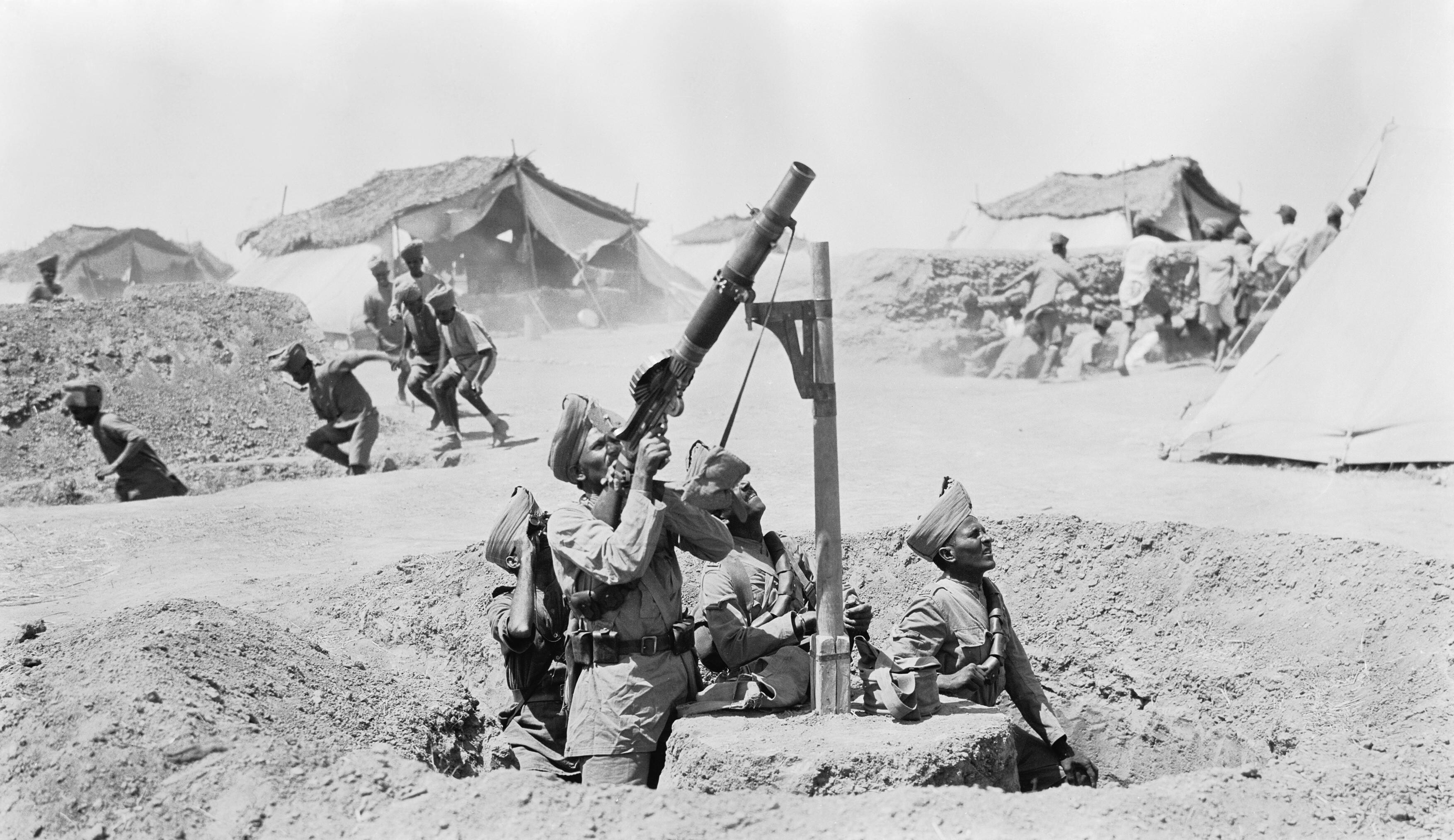
Indian anti-aircraft gunners at Battle of Sheikh Sa'ad

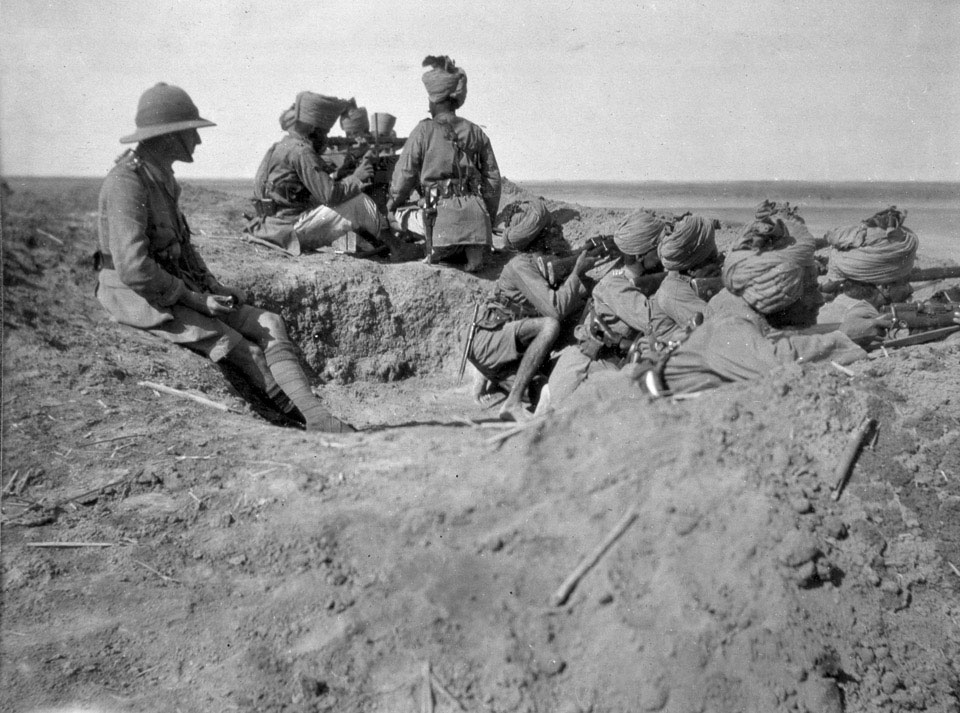
120th Rajputana Infantry with machine gun and rifles

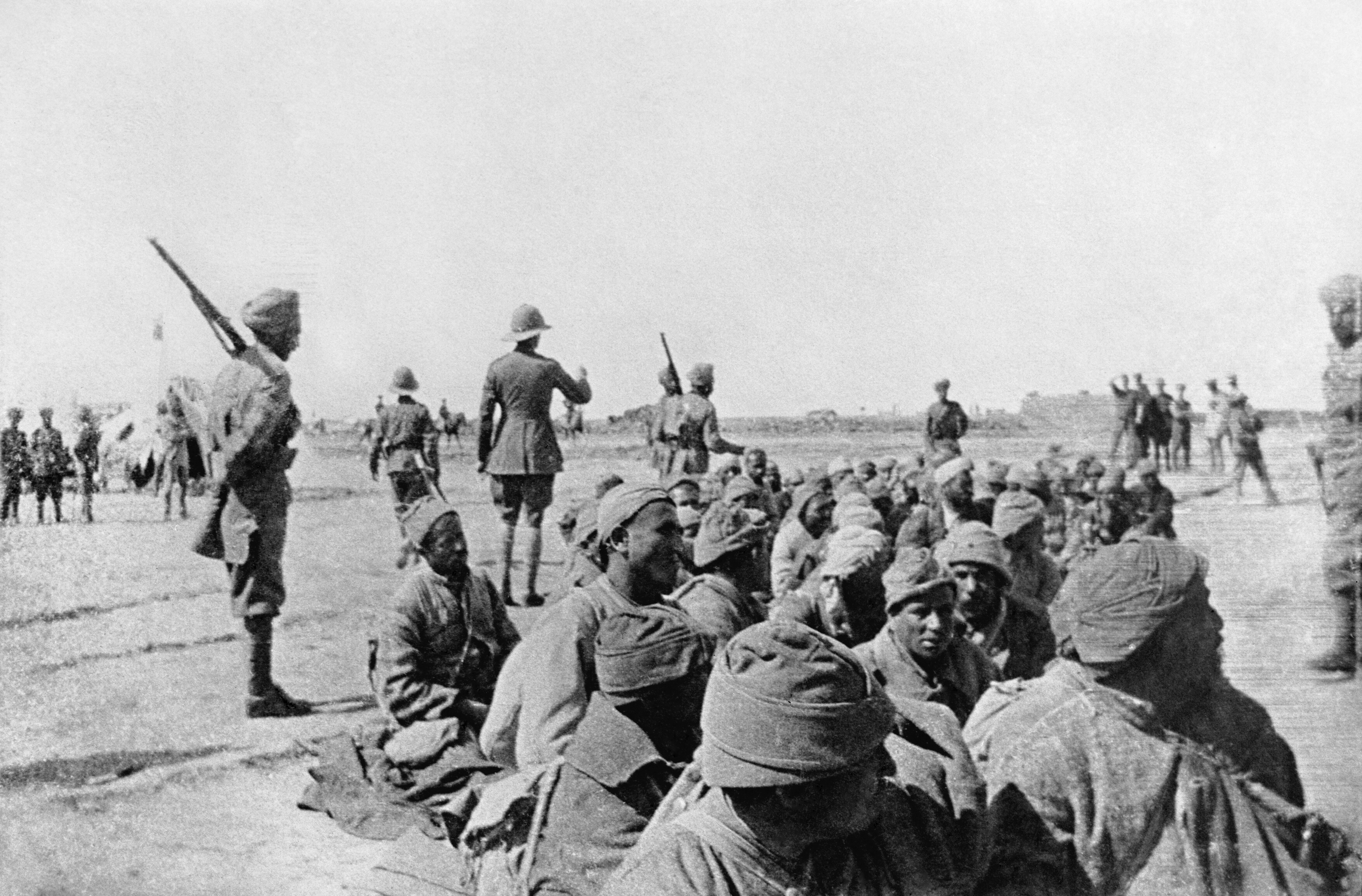
Indian troops guard Turkish prisoners captured at Sannaiyat

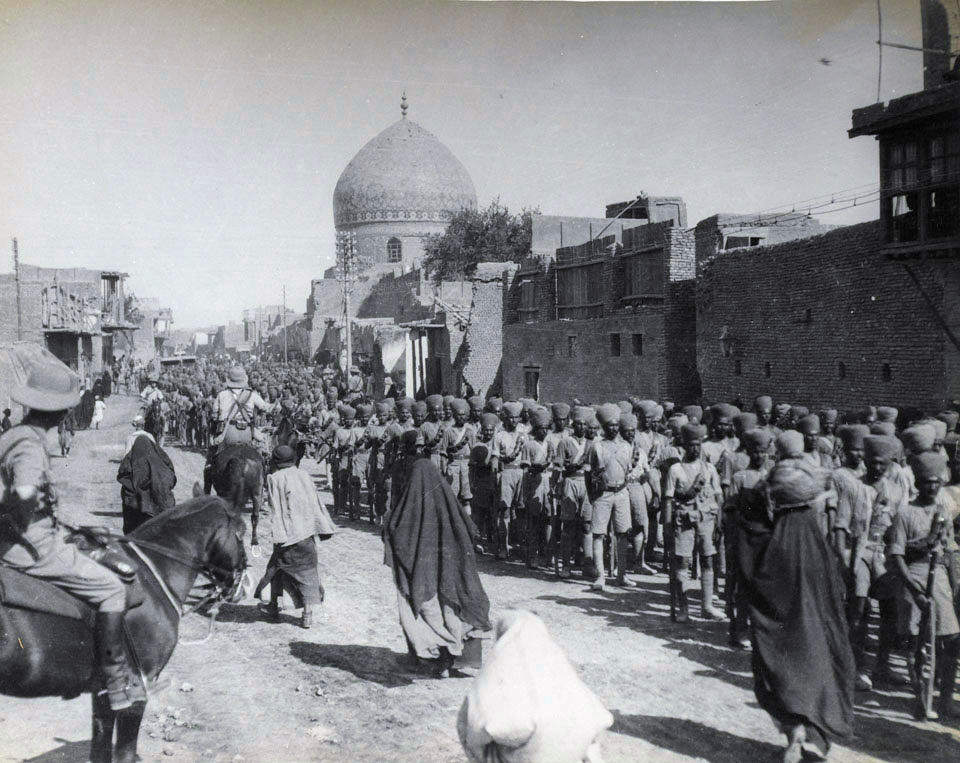
Indian troops march into Baghdad

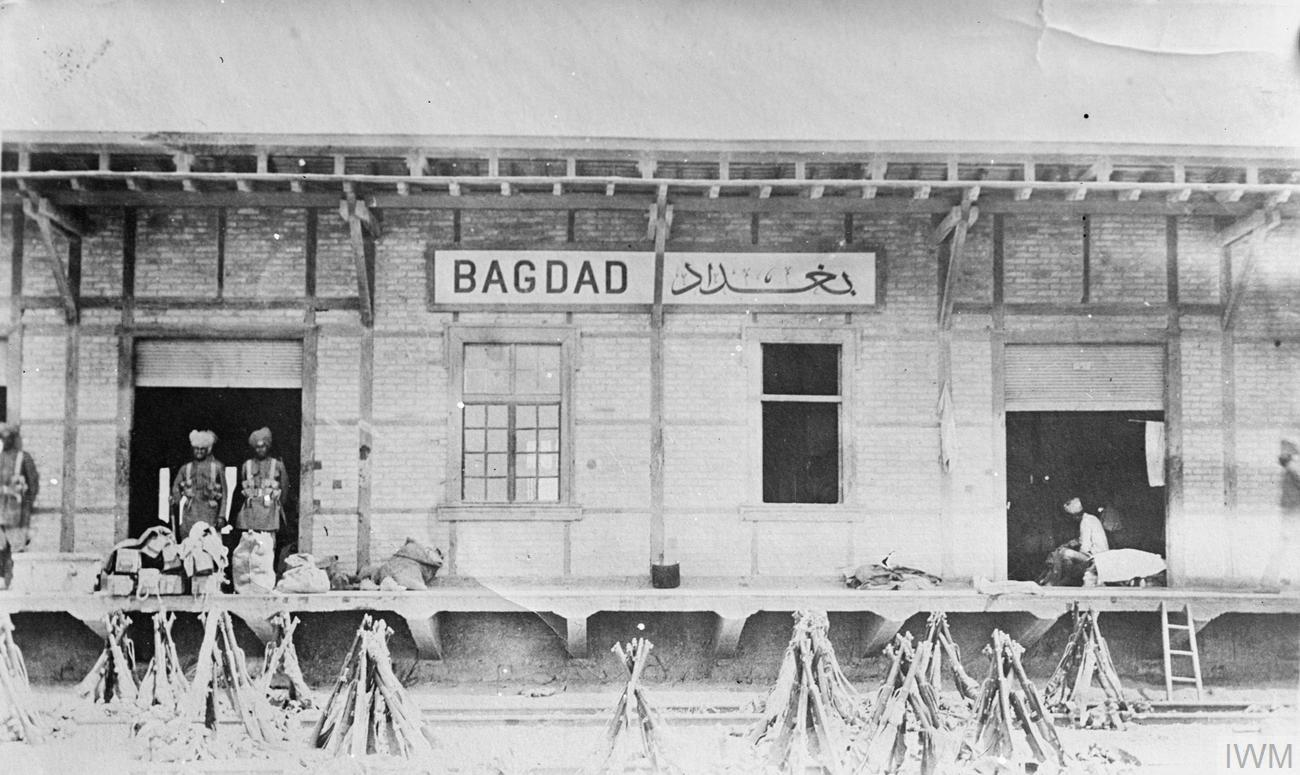
Indian troops guard Baghdad railway station

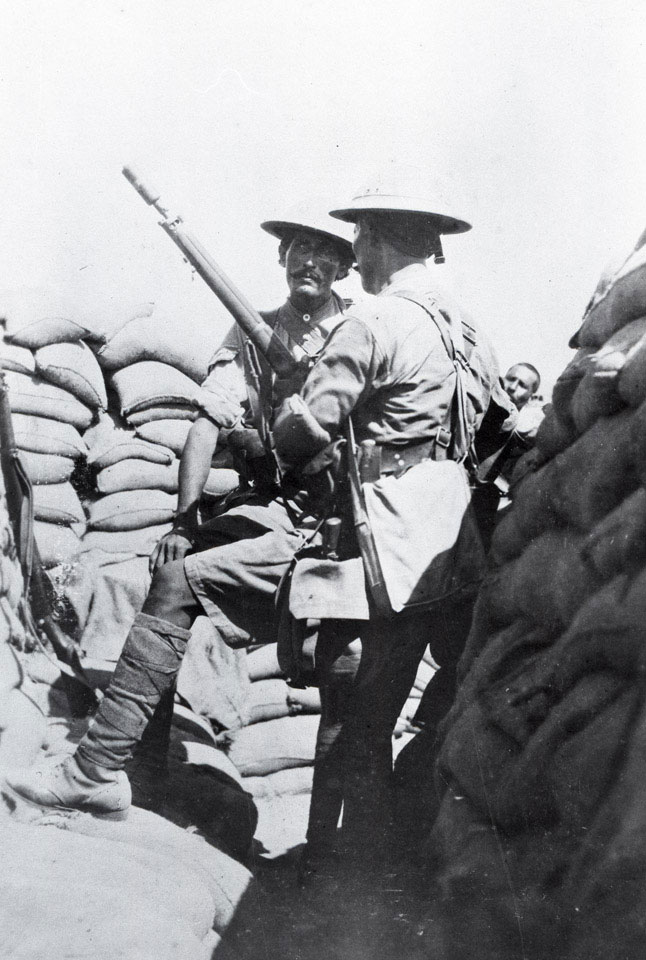
7th (Meerut) Division in the trenches

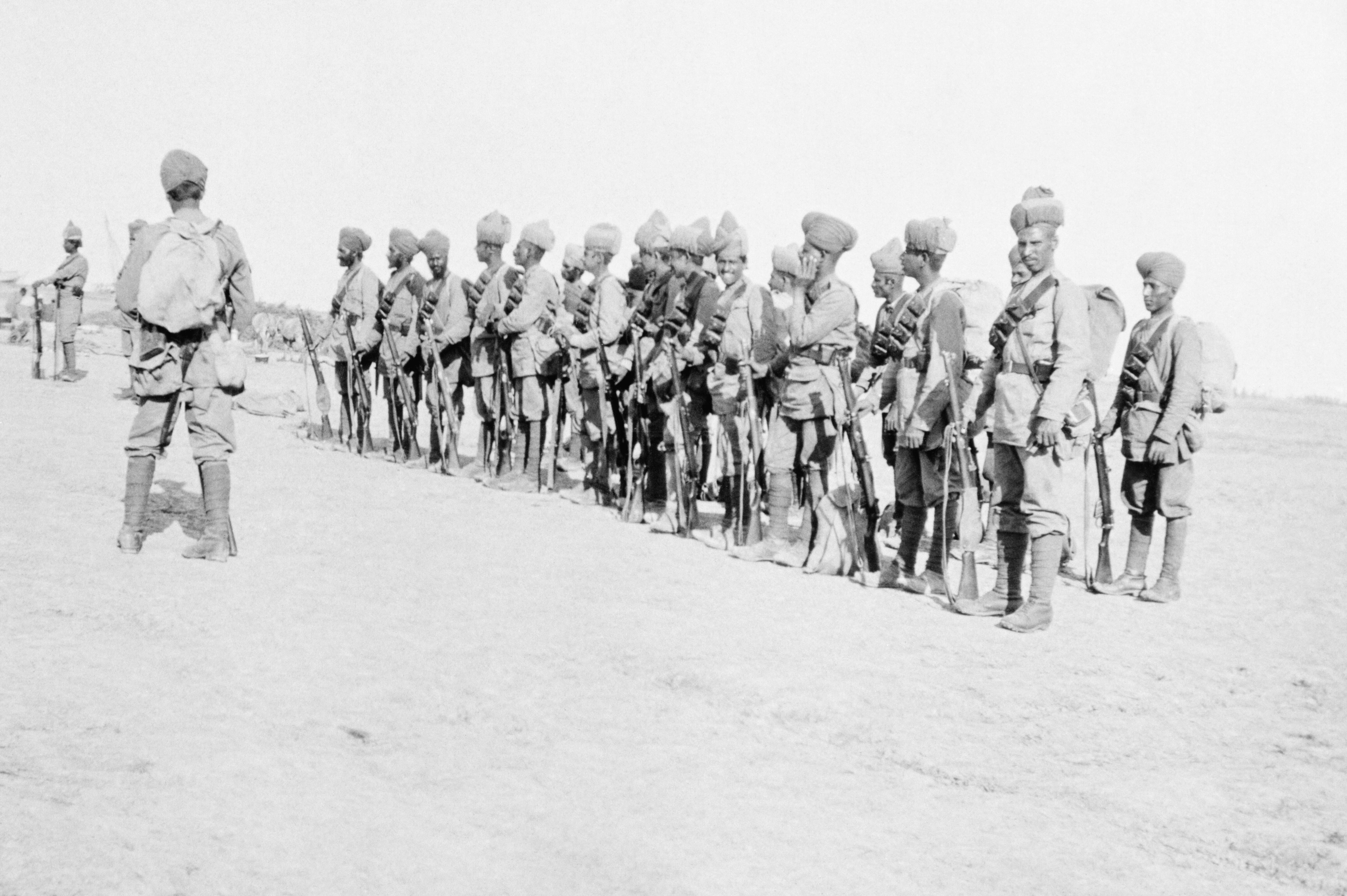
37th Indian Brigade in Basra

=== Indian Expeditionary Force E ===
Indian Expeditionary Force E consisted of the 22nd (Lucknow) Brigade sent to Egypt in October 1914. The designation was retained for all subsequent forces sent there.

Two Indian cavalry divisions (4th Cavalry Division and 5th Cavalry Division) transferred from France in 1918, for service in Palestine. They were joined by the 15th Imperial Service Cavalry Brigade, a unit formed by three regiments of Lancers from the princely states of Mysore, Hyderabad, and Jodhpur. The 3rd (Lahore) Division and the 7th (Meerut) Division were transferred from Mesopotamia. At the same time 36 Indian army battalions were sent to reinforce the British 10th (Irish), 53rd (Welsh), 60th (2/2nd London) and 75th Divisions, which were reformed on Indian division lines with one British and three Indian battalions per brigade.

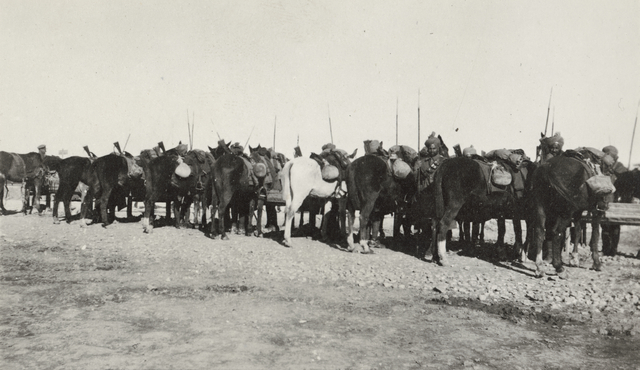
Indian Cavalry at Aleppo

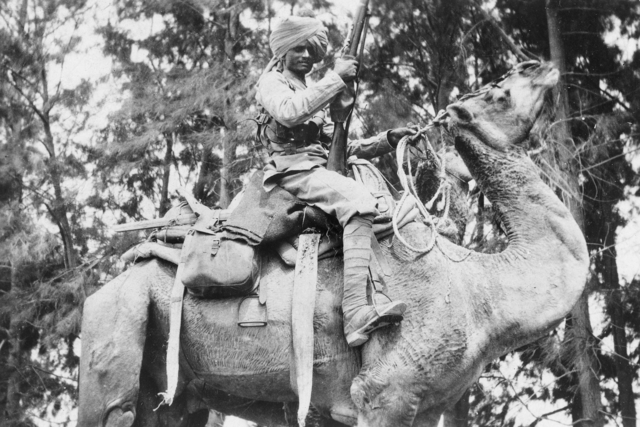
Indian cameleer with full equipment

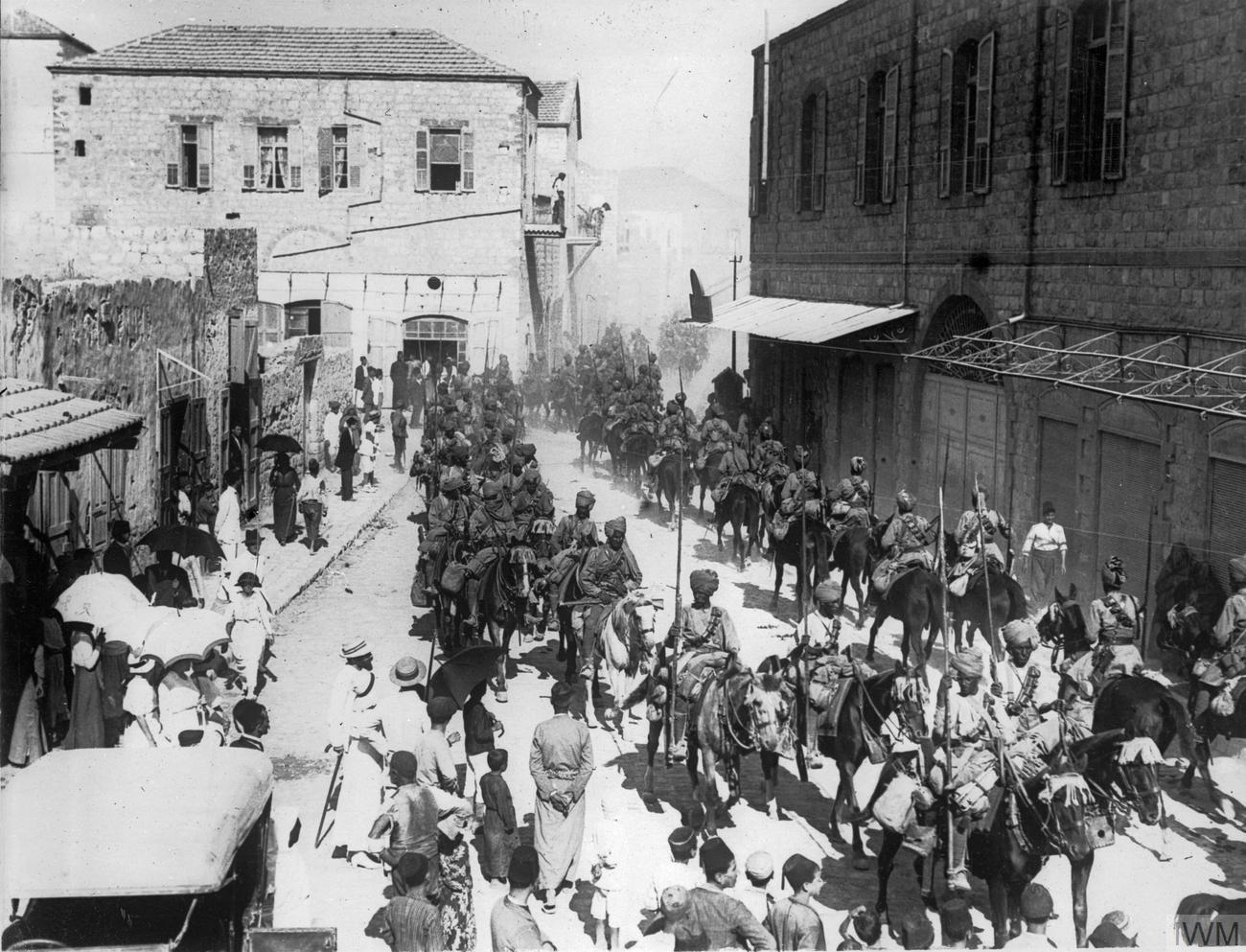
Jodhpur and Mysore lancers march through Haifa

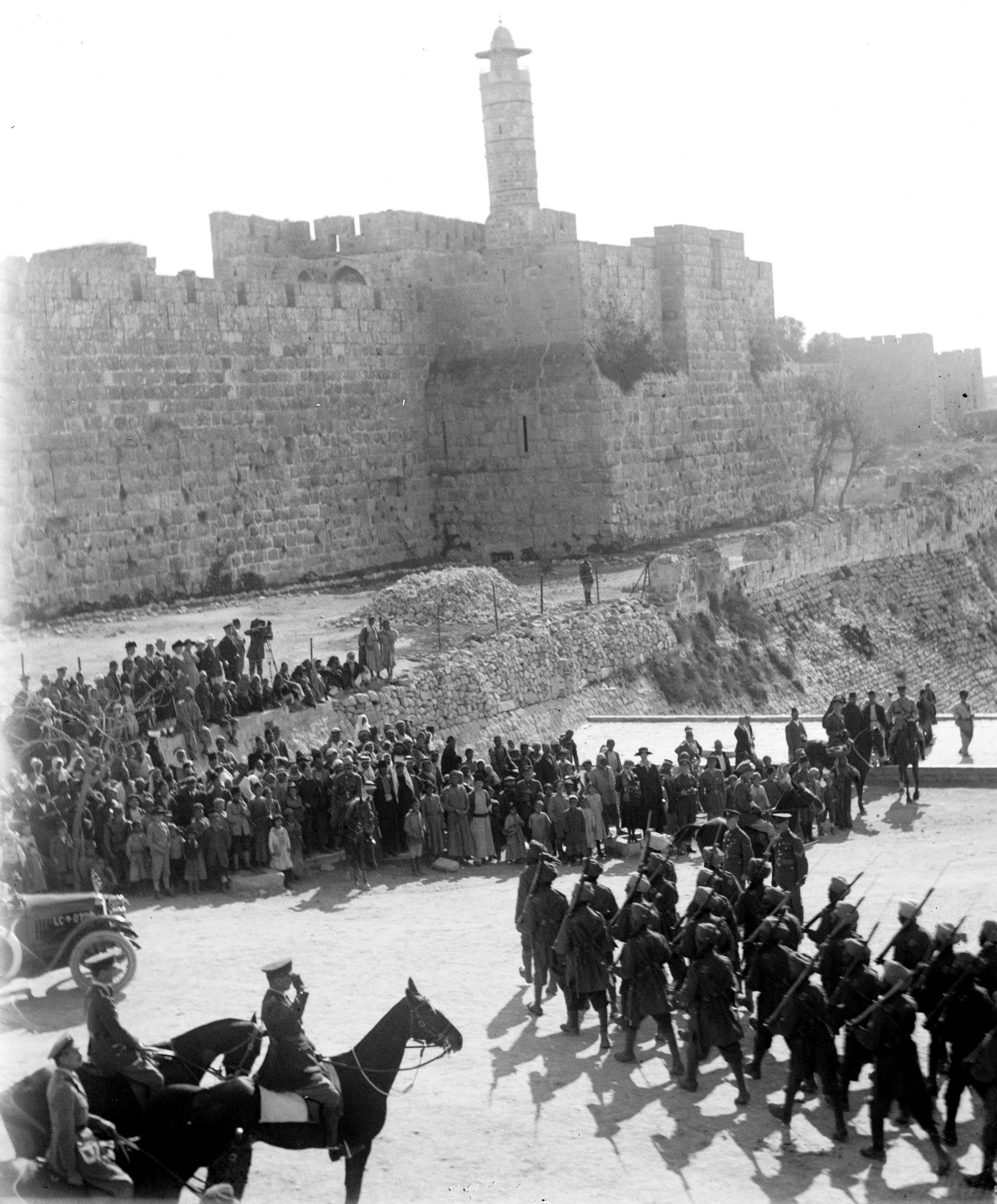
Indian Army outside Jaffa Gate, Jerusalem

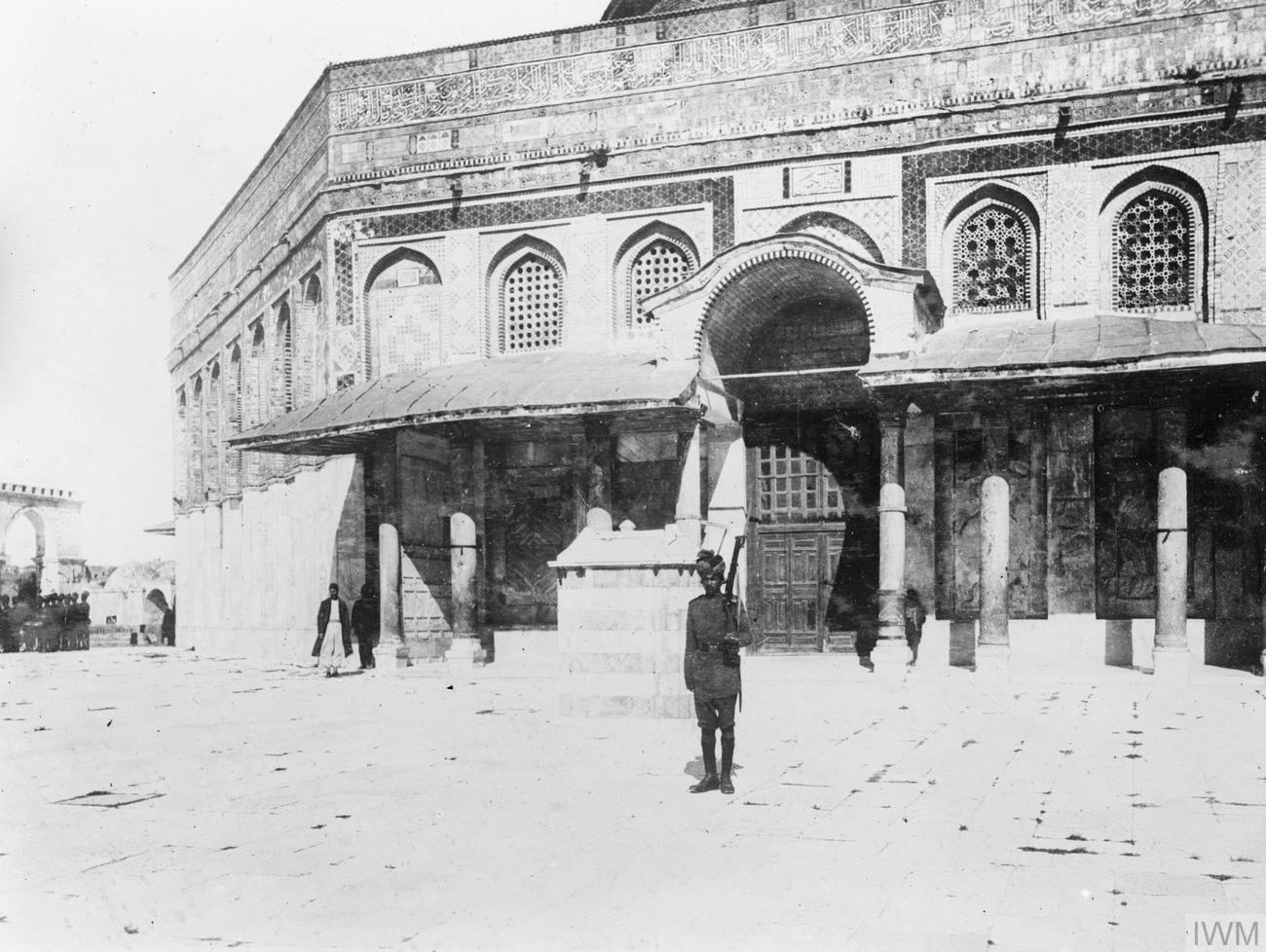
Indian sentry guards Dome of the Rock, Jerusalem

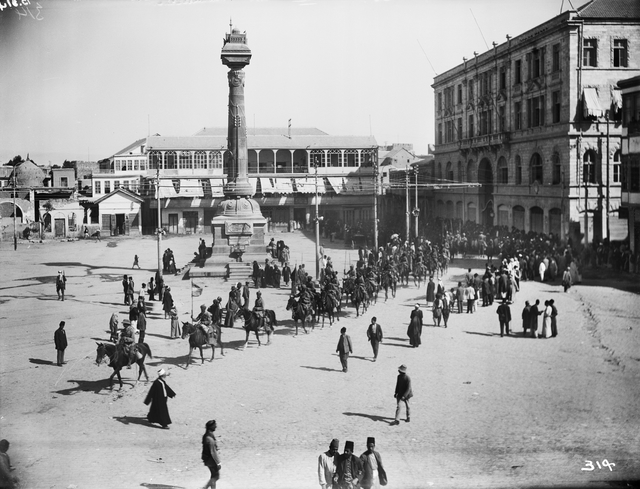
Indian Cavalry enters Damascus

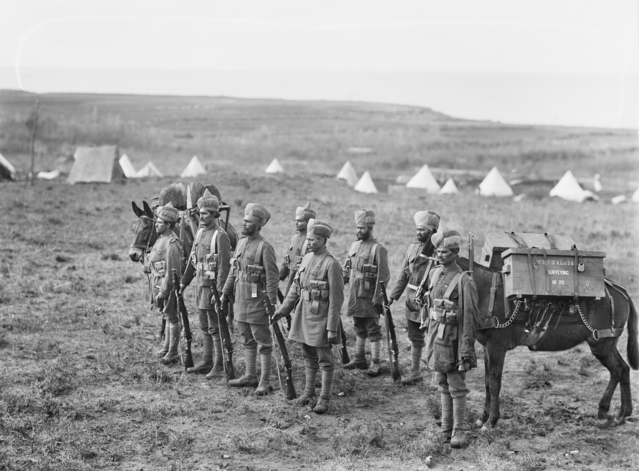
Indian Sappers and Miners in Tripoli, Lebanon

=== Indian Expeditionary Force F ===
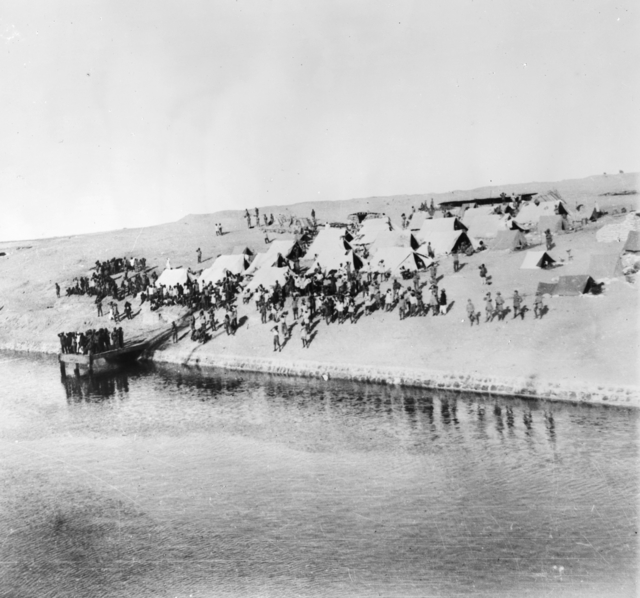
Indian camp at Suez Canal

Indian Expeditionary Force F consisted of the 10th Indian Division and the 11th Indian Division both of which were formed in Egypt in 1914, to defend the Suez canal. Other formations attached were the regular 22nd (Lucknow) Brigade from the 8th Lucknow Division without their British battalions and an Imperial Service Cavalry Brigade.

The 10th Division was disbanded in 1916, and its brigades assigned to other formations. The 28th Indian Brigade was assigned to the 7th (Meerut) Division in 1915; the 29th Indian Brigade served as an independent brigade in the Gallipoli campaign, and then disbanded in June 1917; and the 30th Indian Brigade was first assigned to the 12th Indian Division in April 1915, then transferred to the 6th (Poona) Division in September 1915 and was captured in the fall of Kut.

The 11th Division was disbanded earlier in 1915, but its brigades did not survive much longer. The 22nd (Lucknow) Brigade was broken up in January 1916; the 31st Indian Brigade joined the 10th Division in January 1916, but was disbanded a month later; and the 32nd (Imperial Service) Brigade was disbanded in January 1916.

=== Indian Expeditionary Force G ===
In April 1915, Indian Expeditionary Force G was sent to reinforce the Gallipoli Campaign. It consisted of the 29th Brigade, serving away from its parent 10th Indian Division. Consisting of three battalions of Gurkhas and one of Sikhs, the brigade was dispatched from Egypt and attached to the British 29th Division which had been decimated in the earlier battles. Held in reserve for the Second Battle of Krithia they played a major part in the Third Battle of Krithia. Advancing on the left the Brigade was quickly halted except along the Aegean shore where the 1/6th Gurkha Rifles managed to advance. The 14th Ferozepore Sikhs, advancing along the floor of Gully Ravine, were almost wiped out, losing 380 men out of 514 and 80% of their officers. The Brigade was next involved in the Battle of Gully Ravine and here the 2/10th Gurkha Rifles managed to advance half a mile. The Brigade next took part in the Battle of Sari Bair, under cover of a naval bombardment the 1/6th Gurkha Rifles assaulted and captured the hill, which was then shelled by the Royal Navy. With their casualties mounting and under command of the battalion medical officer they were forced to withdraw to their starting positions. With the failure of the assault at Sari Bair the brigade was withdrawn to Egypt. Over the duration of the campaign the 29th Brigade had suffered 1,358 dead and 3,421 wounded. Peter Stanley's book Die in Battle, Do not Despair: the Indian on Gallipoli, 1915 (Helion & Co. Solihul, 2015) shows that a total of 16,000 troops passed through Force G, and that it suffered about 1623 fatal casualties, listed in his book by name.

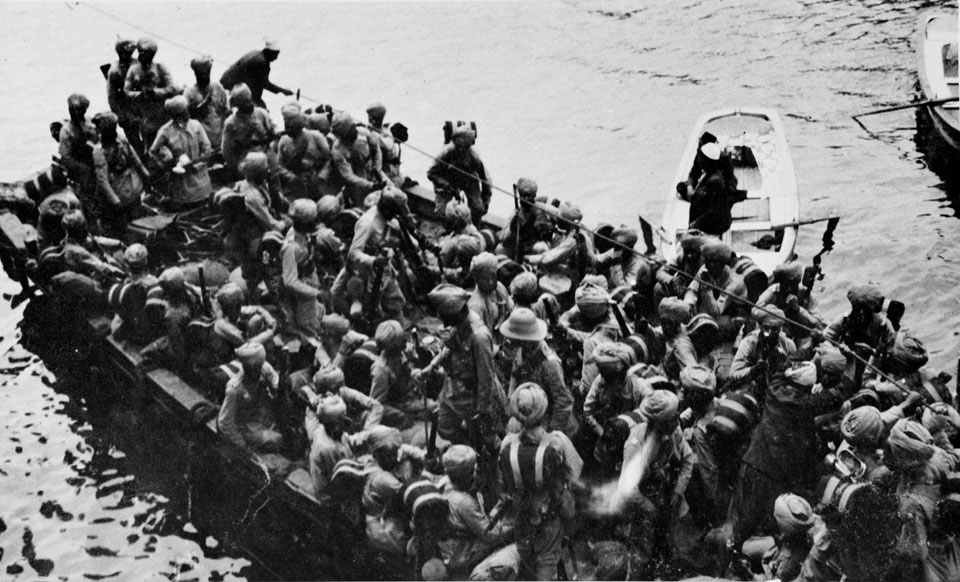
29th Indian Brigade land at Cape Helles

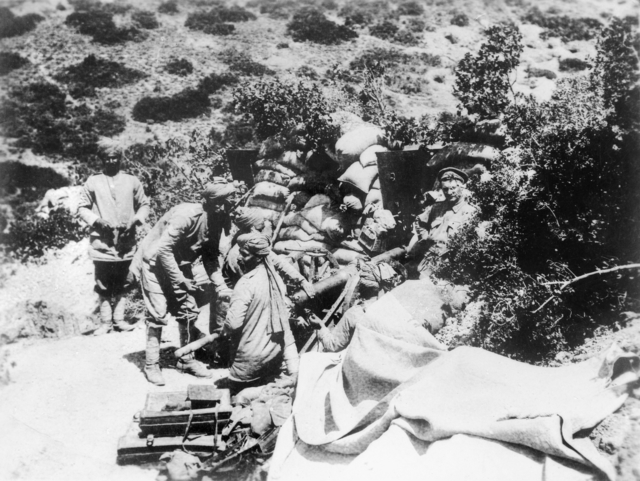
Indian Mountain Battery in action

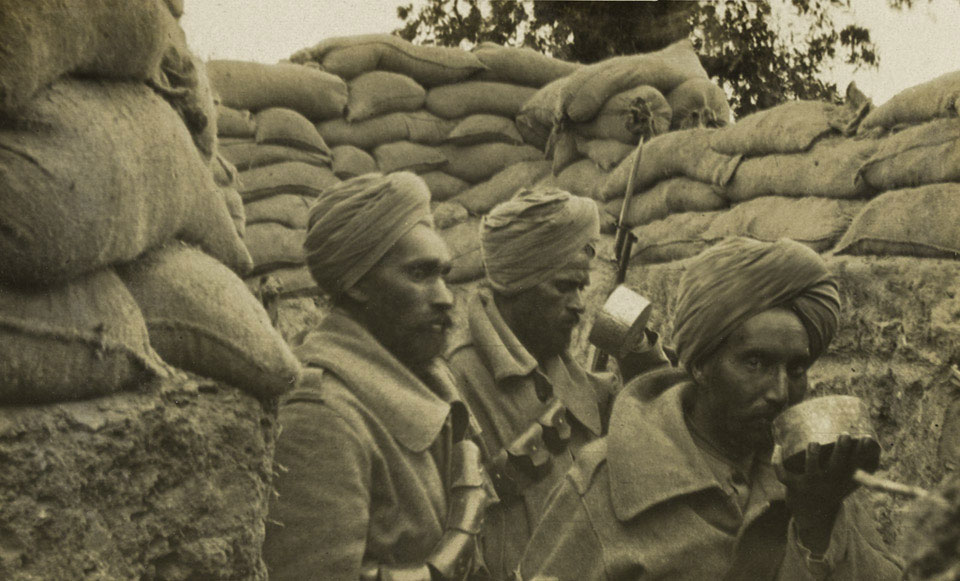
Indian soldiers in the trenches

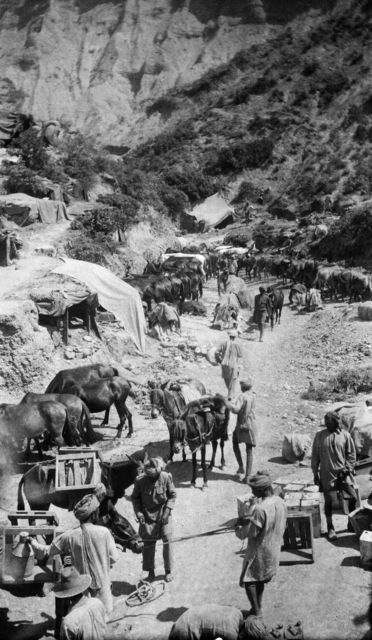
Indian Mule Corps at Mule Gully

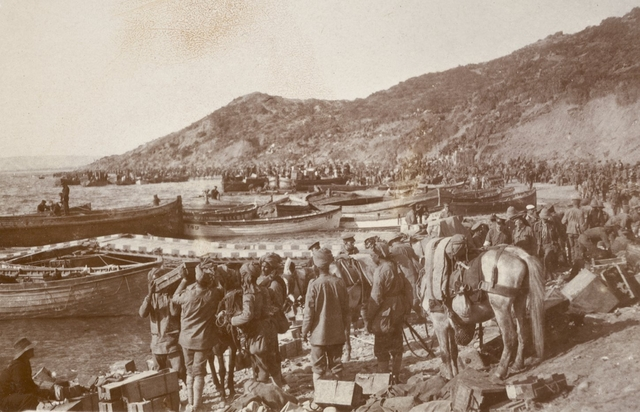
Indian and Anzac troops at Anzac Cove

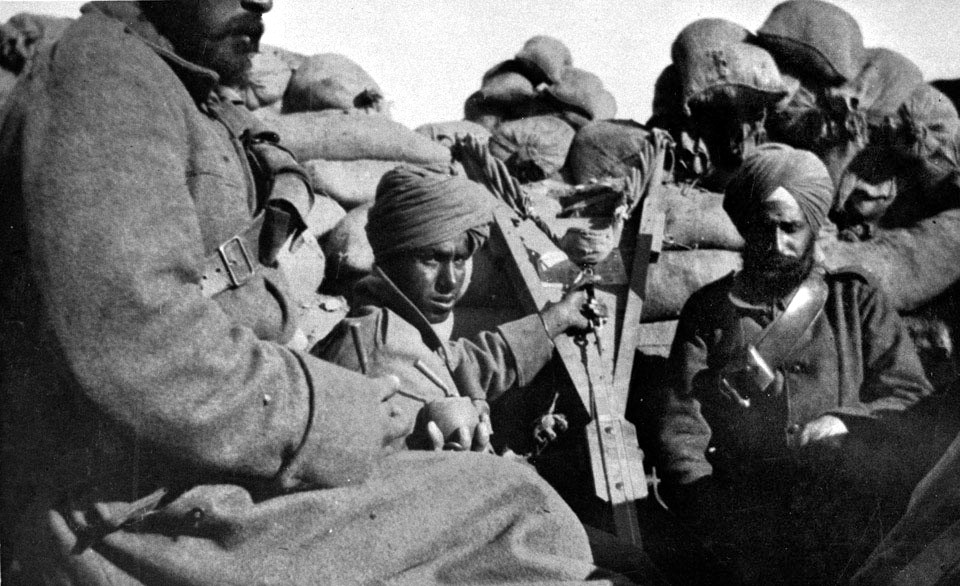
29th Indian Brigade in the trenches

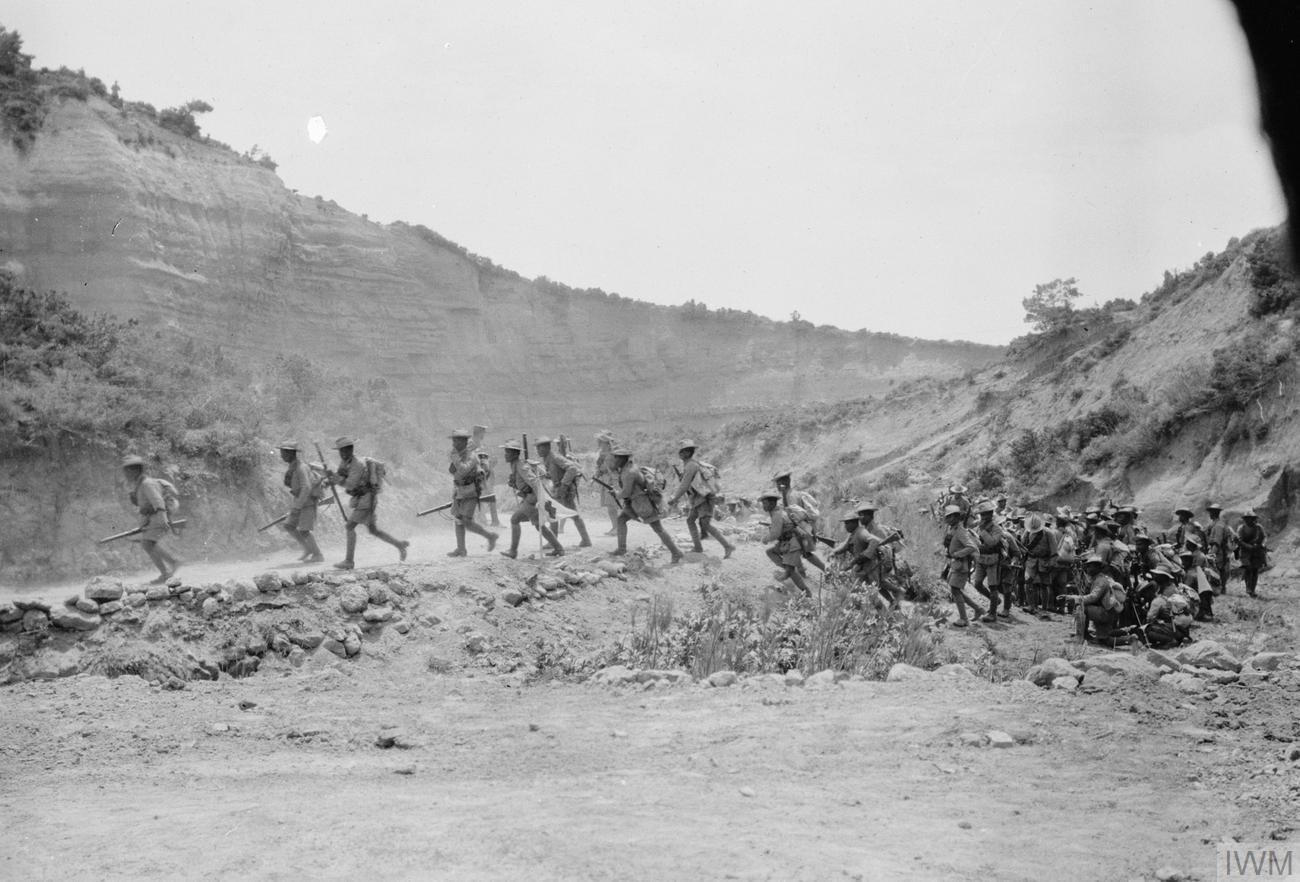
Gurkha Battalion charges through Gully Ravine

== Other operations ==
=== Siege of Qingdao ===
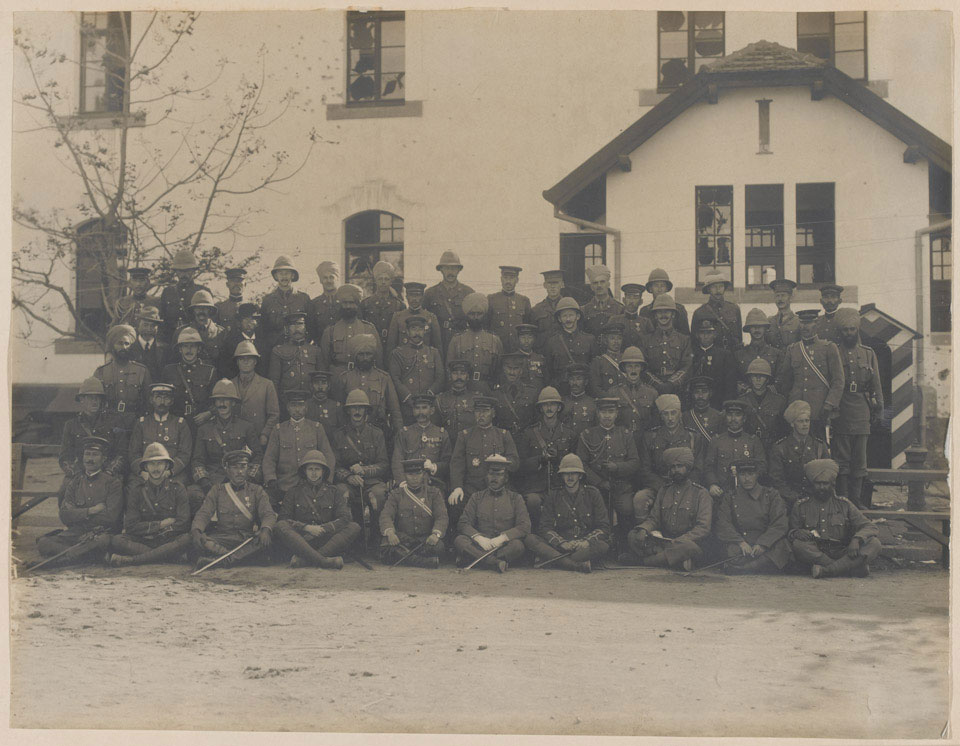
British, Indian and Japanese soldiers in Qingdao

One Indian Army battalion that was part of the Garrison of Tianjin in China, the 36th Sikhs took part in the Siege of Qingdao. Qingdao was a German controlled port in China. The British Government and the other Allied European powers were concerned about Japanese intentions in the region and decided to send a small symbolic British contingent from Tianjin in an effort to allay their fears. The 1,500-man contingent was commanded by Brigadier-General Nathaniel Walter Barnardiston and consisted of 1,000 soldiers of the 2nd Battalion, South Wales Borderers who were later followed by 500 soldiers of the 36th Sikhs. The Japanese led force laid siege to the port between 31 October–7 November 1914. At the end of the siege, Japanese army casualties numbered 236 killed and 1,282 wounded; the British-Indians had 12 killed and 53 wounded. The German defenders suffered 199 dead and 504 wounded.

=== 1915 Singapore Mutiny ===
The 1915 Singapore Mutiny involved up to half of the 850 sepoys comprising the 5th Light Infantry against the British in Singapore during the war, part of the 1915 Ghadar Conspiracy. The 5th Light Infantry had arrived in Singapore from Madras in October 1914. They had been sent to replace the Yorkshire Light Infantry, which had been ordered to France. The 5th Light Infantry consisted of roughly equal numbers of Punjabi Muslims and Pathans serving in separate companies. Their morale was constantly low, being affected by poor communication, slack discipline and a weak leadership. The regiment had been employed to guard the captured crew from the German ship, SMS Emden and reportedly attempts were made to fan the discontent amongst the sepoys. The regiment was under orders to embark for further garrison duty in Hong Kong, however rumours started that they were going to be sent to fight in the Middle East against fellow Muslims from the Ottoman Empire.

On 16 February 1915, while preparations for departure were under way, the four companies of Punjabi Muslims mutinied while the Pathan sepoys of the remaining four companies scattered in confusion. Two of the British officers at the Tanglin barracks were killed and the mutineers then moved on the German prisoner of war camp where they killed thirteen camp guards and other military personnel. The Germans however refused to join them. The mutineers then roamed the streets of Singapore, killing European civilians that they encountered. The mutiny continued for nearly five days and was suppressed by local volunteer and British regular units plus naval detachments from allied warships, and with assistance from the Sultan of Johor.

Following immediate courts-martial a total of 47 mutineers were executed, while 64 were transported for life and another 73 imprisoned for varying terms. Later in 1915 the 5th Light Infantry saw service in the Kamerun campaign and was subsequently sent to East Africa and Aden.

=== 1918 Malleson Mission ===
500 men of the 19th Punjabis were deployed by General Wilfrid Malleson in Transcaspia in support of the Ashkhabad Committee, and known as the Malleson Mission. The Ashkhabad Committee was a revolutionary organisation led by Mensheviks and Socialist Revolutionaries who were in an armed conflict with the Bolshevik Tashkent Soviet.

== Victoria Cross recipients ==
Indian soldiers had not been eligible for the Victoria Cross until 1911, instead they received the Indian Order of Merit, an older decoration originally set up in the days of East India Company rule in India.

The honour of being the first Indian recipient of the Victoria Cross (VC) in any conflict went to Khudadad Khan, 129th Duke of Connaught's Own Baluchis. On 31 October 1914, at Hollebeke, Belgium, during a German attack, the British officer in charge of the detachment having been wounded, and the other machinegun put out of action by a shell, Sepoy Khudadad, though wounded, remained working his machinegun until all the other five men of the gun detachment had been killed.

Other members of the Indian Army awarded the Victoria Cross during World War I were:

- Darwan Singh Negi, 1st Battalion 39th Garhwal Rifles
  - "For great gallantry on the night of the 23–24 November 1914, near Festubert, France, when the regiment was engaged in retaking and clearing the enemy out of our trenches, and, although wounded in two places in the head, and also in the arm, being one of the first to push round each successive traverse, in the face of severe fire from bombs and rifles at the closest range".
- Lt. Frank Alexander de Pass, 34th Prince Albert Victor's Own Poona Horse
  - "For conspicuous bravery near Festubert on 24 November 1914, in entering a German sap and destroying a traverse in the face of the enemy's bombs, and for subsequently rescuing, under heavy fire, a wounded man who was lying exposed in the open."
- William Bruce, 59th Scinde Rifles (British-born)
  - On 19 December 1914, near Givenchy, during a night attack, Lt. Bruce was in command of a small party which captured one of the enemy's trenches. In spite of being severely wounded in the neck, he walked up and down the trench, encouraging his men to hold on against several counter-attacks for some hours until killed. The fire from rifles and bombs was very heavy all day, and it was due to the skilful disposition made, and the example and encouragement shown by Lt. Bruce that his men were able to hold out until dusk, when the trench was finally captured by the enemy.
- Eustace Jotham, 51st Sikhs attached North Waziristan Militia
  - On 7 January 1915, at Spina Khaisora (Tochi Valley) During operations against the Khostwal tribesmen, Captain Jotham, who was commanding a party of about a dozen of the North Waziristan Militia, was attacked in a nullah and almost surrounded by an overwhelming force of some 1,500 tribesmen. He gave the order to retire, and could have himself escaped, but most gallantly sacrificed his own life by attempting to effect the rescue of one of his men who had lost his horse.
- Gabar Singh Negi, 39th Garhwal Rifles
  - On 10 March 1915, at Neuve Chapelle. During the attack on the German position, Nk Gabar Singh Negi was one of a bayonet party with bombs who entered their main trench, and was the first man to go round each traverse, driving back the enemy until they were eventually forced to surrender. He was killed during this engagement.
- Mir Dast, 55th Coke's Rifles (Frontier Force)
  - On 26 April 1915, at Wieltje, Belgium, Jemadar Mir Dast led his platoon with great bravery during the attack, and afterwards collected various parties of the regiment (when no British officers were left) and kept them under his command until the retirement was ordered. He also displayed great courage that day when he helped to carry eight British and Indian officers to safety while exposed to heavy fire.
- John Smyth 15th Ludhiana Sikhs (British-born)
  - For most conspicuous bravery near Richebourg L'Avoue on 18 May 1915. With a bombing party of 10 men, who voluntarily undertook this duty, he conveyed a supply of 96 bombs to within 20 yards of the enemy's position over exceptionally dangerous ground, after the attempts of two other parties had failed. Lieutenant Smyth succeeded in taking the bombs to the desired position with the aid of two of his men (the other eight having been killed or wounded), and to effect his purpose he had to swim a stream, being exposed the whole time to howitzer, shrapnel, machine-gun and rifle fire.
- Kulbir Thapa, 3rd Gurkha Rifles.
  - On 25 September 1915 in Fauquissart, France, Rifleman Thapa, having been wounded himself, found a wounded soldier of The Leicestershire Regiment behind the first line German trench. Although urged to save himself, the Gurkha stayed with the wounded man all day and night. Early next day, in misty weather, he took him through the German wire and, leaving him in a place of comparative safety, returned and brought in two wounded Gurkhas, one after the other. He then went back, and, in broad daylight, fetched the British soldier, carrying him most of the way under enemy fire.
- Lala, 41st Dogras
  - On 21 January 1916, at El Orah, Mesopotamia, finding a British officer lying close to the enemy, Lance-Naik Lala dragged him into a temporary shelter. After bandaging his wounds, the lance-naik heard calls from his own adjutant who was lying wounded in the open. The enemy was only 100 yards (91 m) away. Lala insisted on going to help. He stripped off his own clothing to keep the wounded officer warm and stayed with him until just before dark when he returned to the shelter. After dark he carried the first wounded officer to safety and then, returning with a stretcher, carried back his adjutant.
- John Alexander Sinton, Indian Medical Service (Canadian-born)
  - On 21 January 1916, at the Orah Ruins, Mesopotamia, Captain Sinton attended to the wounded under very heavy fire. "For most conspicuous bravery and devotion to duty. Although shot through both arms and through the side, he refused to go to hospital, and remained as long as daylight lasted, attending to his duties under very heavy fire. In three previous actions Captain Sinton displayed the utmost bravery."
- Shahamad Khan, 89th Punjabis
  - On 12–13 April 1916 near Beit Ayeesa, Mesopotamia, Naik Shahamad Khan was in charge of a machine-gun covering a gap in our new line within 150 yards of the entrenched enemy. He beat off three counter-attacks and worked his gun single-handed after all his men, except two belt-fillers, had become casualties. For three hours he held the gap under very heavy fire and when his gun was knocked out, he and his two belt-fillers held their ground with rifles until ordered to withdraw. With help he then brought back his gun, ammunition and one severely wounded man, and finally all remaining arms and equipment.
- Gobind Singh, 28th Light Cavalry
  - On the night of 30 November and 1 December 1917, east of Pozières, France, Lance-Dafadar Gobind Singh three times volunteered to carry messages between the regiment and brigade headquarters, a distance of 1.5 miles (2.4 km) over open ground which was under heavy fire from the enemy. He succeeded each time in delivering the message, although on each occasion his horse was shot and he was compelled to finish the journey on foot.
- Karanbahadur Rana, 3rd Gurkha Rifles
  - On 10 April 1918, at El Kefr, Egypt, during an attack, Rifleman Karanbahadur Rana and a few other men crept forward with a Lewis gun under intense fire to engage an enemy machine-gun. No. 1 of the Lewis gun team opened fire but was shot almost immediately, whereupon the rifleman pushed the dead man off the gun, opened fire, knocked out the enemy gun crew and then silenced the fire of the enemy bombers and riflemen in front of him. During the remainder of the day he did magnificent work and finally assisted with covering fire in the withdrawal, until the enemy were close on him.
- Badlu Singh, 14th Murray's Jat Lancers
  - "On 2 September 1918 on the west bank of the River Jordan, Palestine, when his squadron was charging a strong enemy position, Ressaidar Badlu Singh "realised that heavy casualties were being inflicted from a small hill occupied by machine-guns and 200 infantry. Without any hesitation he collected six other ranks and with entire disregard of danger he charged and captured the position. He was mortally wounded on the very top of the hill when capturing one of the machine-guns single handed, but all the guns and infantry had surrendered to him before he died".

== Aftermath ==
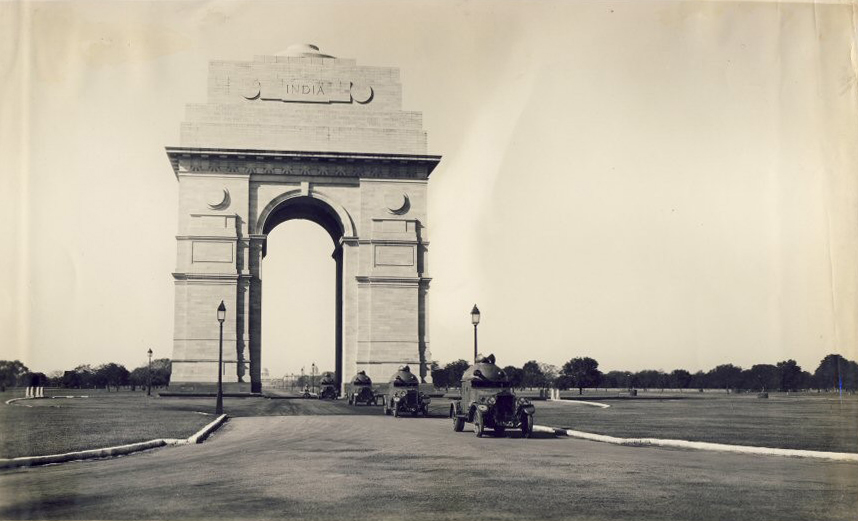
The India Gate commemorates the 70,000 Indian soldiers who lost their lives during the war

In 1919, the Indian Army could call upon 491,000 men, but there was a shortage of experienced officers, most of the officers having been killed or wounded in the war. In 1921, the Indian government started a review of their military requirements with the protection of the North West Frontier and internal security their priority. By 1925, the Army in India had been reduced to 197,000 troops, 140,000 of them Indian.

Battalions were now allocated one of three roles: The field army of four infantry divisions and five cavalry brigades; covering troops, 12 infantry brigades and supporting arms to act as a reserve force in case of invasion; and finally internal security troops, 43 infantry battalions to aid the civil power and support the field army when required. The number of cavalry regiments was reduced from 39 to 21. The infantry regiments were converted into 20 large regiments with four or five battalions in each regiment plus a training battalion, always numbered the 10th, also included were ten Gurkha regiments. Nine single battalion regiments were disbanded by 1922. Two of the large regiments were later disbanded, the 3rd Madras Regiment for economic reasons, and the 20th Burma Rifles when Burma ceased to be governed by India.

The end of World War I did not see the end of fighting for the Indian Army—they were involved in the Third Afghan War in 1919, and then the Waziristan Campaign in 1919–1920 and again in 1920–1924. Operations against the Afridis in 1930–1931, the Mohmands in 1933 and again in 1935 and finally just before the outbreak of World War II operations in Waziristan again in 1936–1939.

The India Gate in New Delhi, built in 1931, commemorates the Indian soldiers who lost their lives fighting in World War I.

== See also ==
- Indian Army (1895–1947)
- Indian Labour Corps
- Defence of India Act 1915
- Indian Army during World War II

== Bibliography ==
- "Honour and Fidelity: India's Military Contribution to the Great War 1914-1918 " by Captain Amarinder Singh
- Barthorp, Michael (2002). Afghan Wars and the North-West Frontier 1839–1947. Cassell. ISBN 0-304-36294-8.
- Baura, Pradeep (2005). The state at war in South Asia. University of Nebraska Press. ISBN 0-8032-1344-1.
- Bridger, Geoff (2009). The Great War Handbook. Barnsley: Pen and Sword. ISBN 978-1-84415-936-9.
- Chappell, Mike (2003). The British Army in World War I: The Western Front 1914–16. Osprey Publishing. ISBN 1-84176-399-3.
- Chappell, Mike (2005). The British Army in World War I: The Eastern Fronts Volume 3 of The British Army in World War I. Osprey Publishing. ISBN 1-84176-401-9.
- Davis, Paul K (1994). Ends and means: the British Mesopotamian campaign and commission. Associated University Press. ISBN 0-8386-3530-X.
- Ford, Roger (2009). Eden to Armageddon: The First World War in the Middle East. London: Weidenfeld and Nicolson. ISBN 978-0-297-84481-5.
- Heathcote, T A (1995). The Military in British India: the development of British land forces in South Asia, 1600–1947. Manchester University Press ND. ISBN 0-7190-3570-8.
- Hoyt, Edwin P (1981). Guerilla: Colonel von Lettow-Vorbeck and Germany's East African Empire. Macmillan Publishing Co. ISBN 0-02-555210-4.
- Jeffery, Keith (1984). The British Army and the Crisis of Empire, 1918–22. Manchester University Press ND. ISBN 0-7190-1717-3.
- Karsh, Efraim (2001). Empires of the Sand: The Struggle for Mastery in the Middle East. Harvard University Press. ISBN 0-674-00541-4.
- Kinzer, Stephen (2003). All the Shah's Men: An American Coup and the Roots of Middle East Terror. London: Stephen Kinzer, John Wiley and Sons. p. 48. ISBN 0-471-26517-9.
- March, Francis Andrew (1921). History of the World War. Plain Label Books. ISBN 1-60303-242-8.
- Miller, Charles (1974). Battle for the Bundu: The First World War in German East Africa. Macdonald & Jane's. ISBN 0-02-584930-1.
- Morton-Jack, George (2018). Army of empire : the untold story of the Indian Army in World War I. New York, NY: Hachette Book Group (eBook) Basic Books. ISBN 9780465094073.
- Pati, Budheswar (1996). India and the First World War. Atlantic Publishers & Distributors. ISBN 81-7156-581-6.
- Perrett, Bryan (1999). Megiddo 1918. Osprey Publishing. ISBN 1-85532-827-5.
- Perry, Frederick William (1988). The Commonwealth Armies. Manchester University Press ND. ISBN 0-7190-2595-8.
- Perry, F.W. (1993). Order of Battle of Divisions Part 5B. Indian Army Divisions. Newport: Ray Westlake Military Books. ISBN 1-871167-23-X.
- Reid, Brian Holden (1997). Military Power: land warfare in theory and practice. Routledge. ISBN 0-7146-4768-3.
- Riddick, John F (2006). The History of British India: a chronology. Greenwood Publishing Group. ISBN 0-313-32280-5.
- Rinaldi, Richard A (2008). Order of Battle British Army 1914. Ravi Rikhye. ISBN 978-0-9776072-8-0.
- Sumner, Ian (2001). The Indian Army 1914–1947. Osprey Publishing. ISBN 1-84176-196-6.
- Werner, Haupt (1994). Deutschlands Schutzgebiete in Übersee : 1884–1918. Podzun Pallas Verlag. ISBN 3-7909-0204-7.
- Willmott, H P (2003). First World War. Dorling Kindersley. ISBN 1-4053-0029-9.
