= South Persia Brigade =

British Brigade

The South Persia Brigade was a brigade of the British Indian Army formed in 1915, for service in south Persia and the Persian Gulf as part of the Persian Campaign.

== Bibliography ==
- Sumner, Ian (2001). The Indian Army 1914-1947. Osprey Publishing. ISBN 1-84176-196-6.
