= Indian Cavalry Corps order of battle in the First World War =

The Indian Cavalry Corps was formed 18 December 1914.

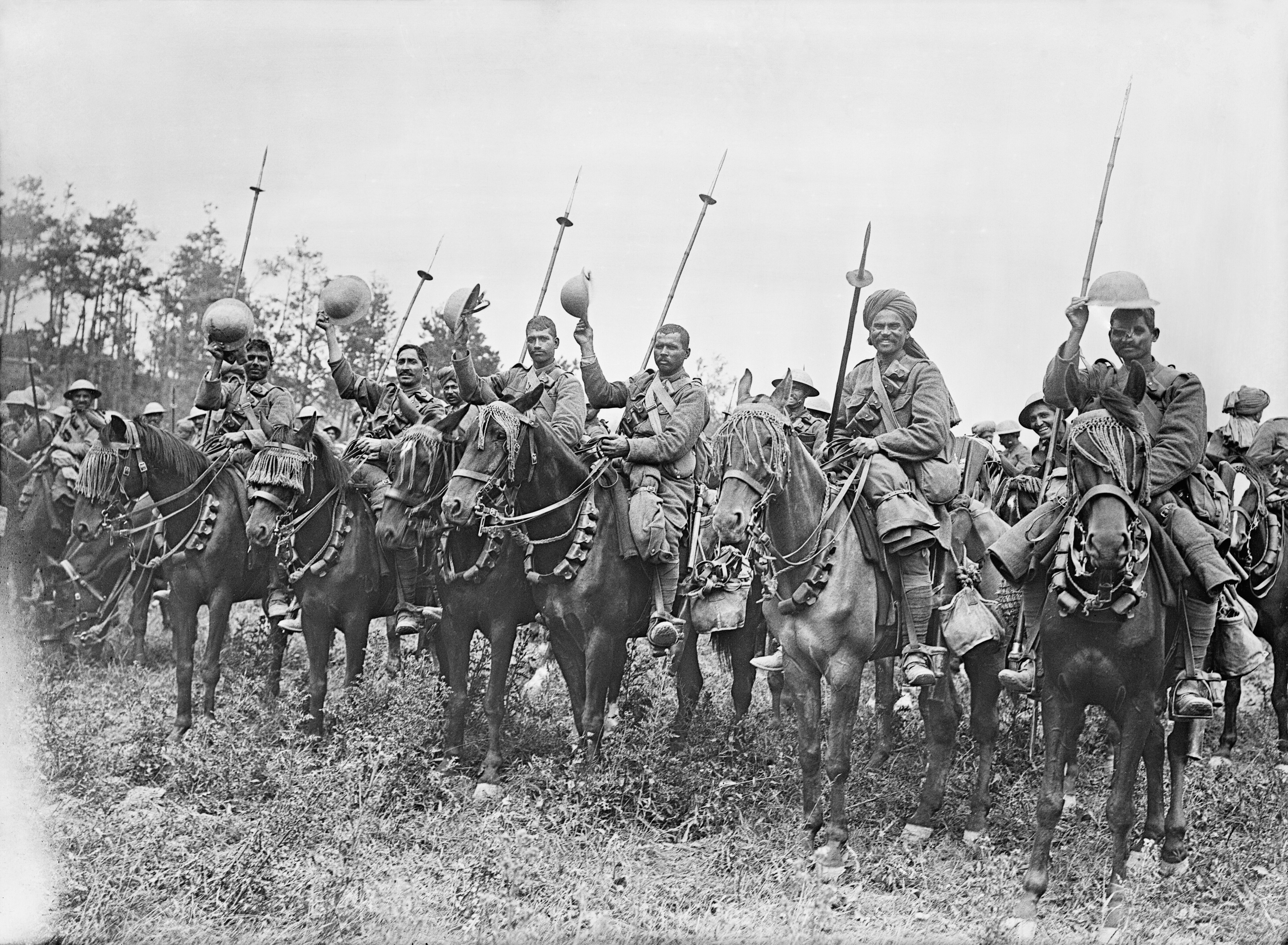
Indian Cavalry at Carnoy, France in July 1916

== Command ==
Commander Lieutenant-General Michael Rimington
Brigadier-General General Staff Henry Macandrew
Brigadier-General Royal Artillery Robert St Clair Lecky

== Corps Troops ==
Jodhpur Lancers
1st Indian Signal Squadron
Jodhpur Cavalry Field Ambulance

== 1st Indian Cavalry Division ==
Arrived in France 7 November 1914

Major-General M.F. Rimington

Major-General H.D. Fanshawe from 22 December 1914

GSO 1 Lieutenant-Colonel H.J.M. Macandrew

Lieutenant-Colonel R. O'Bryan Taylor from 26 December 1914

Commander Royal Horse Artillery Colonel R St C Leeky

Lieutenant-Colonel H Rouse from 11 December 1914

Commander Royal Engineers Colonel C E Baddeley

Lieutenant-Colonel C A J Leslie from 11 December 1914

=== 2nd (Sialkot) Cavalry Brigade ===
Brigadier-General H.P. Leader

- 17th (Duke of Cambridge's Own) Lancers
- 6th King Edward's Own Cavalry
- 19th Lancers (Fane's Horse)
- Signal Troop

=== 3rd (Ambala) Cavalry Brigade ===
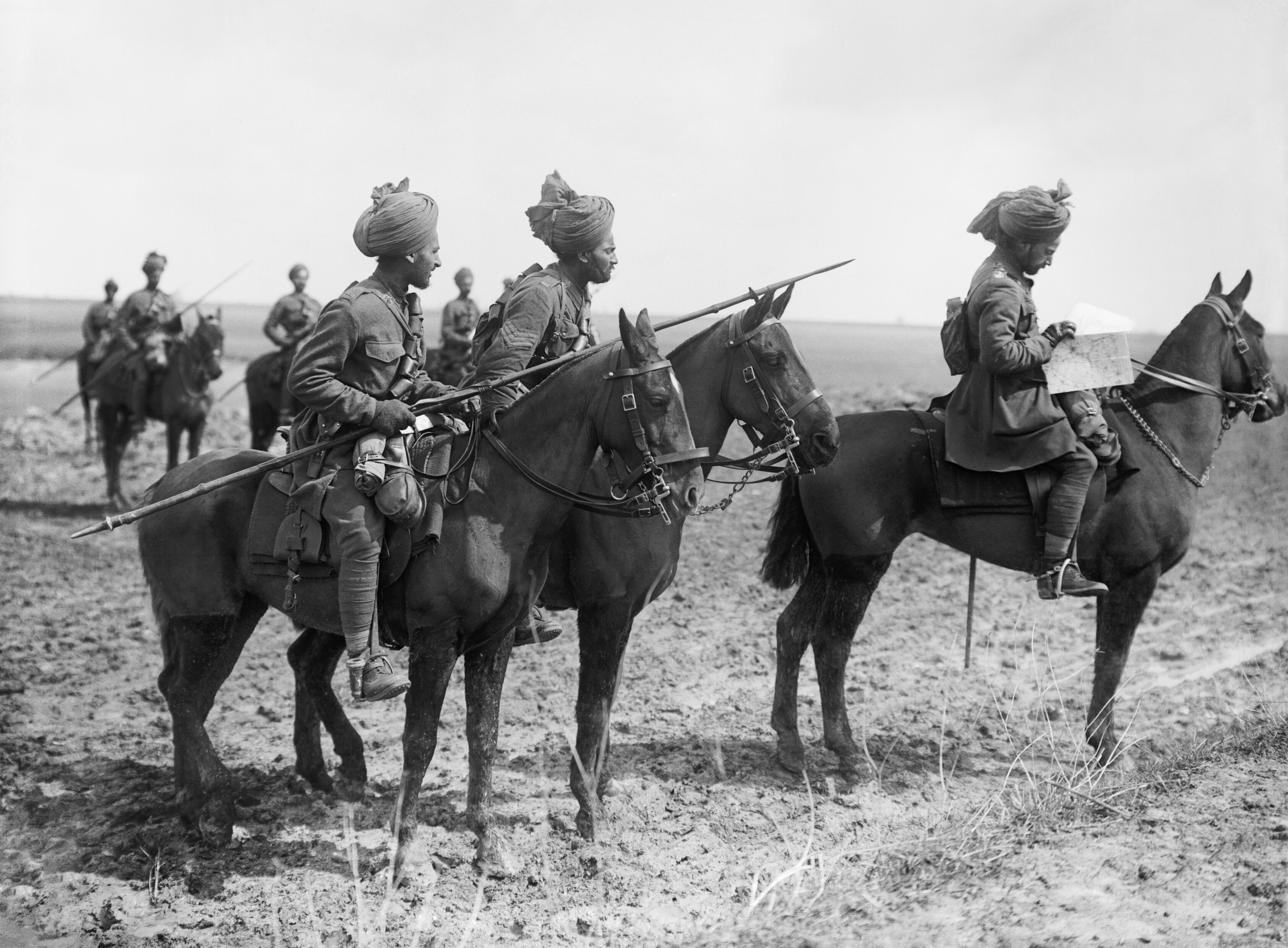
Forward scouts of the 9th Hodson's Horse pause to consult a map, near Vraignes, France in April 1917

Major-General C.P.W. Pirie

- 8th (King's Royal Irish) Hussars
- 9th Hodson's Horse
- 30th Lancers (Gordon's Horse)
- Signal Troop

=== 8th (Lucknow) Cavalry Brigade ===
Major-General G.A. Cookson

Brigadier-General W.H. Fasken from 9 December 1914

- 1st King's Dragoon Guards
- 29th Lancers (Deccan Horse)
- 36th Jacob's Horse
- Signal Troop

=== 1st Indian Cavalry Division Troops ===
I Indian Brigade, Royal Horse Artillery

A Battery, RHA
Q Battery, RHA
U Battery, RHA

I Indian Brigade Ammunition Column

B Section
C Section
G Section

2nd Indian Field Troop Royal Engineers
2nd Indian Signal Squadron
1st Indian Supply Column
Sialkot Field Ambulance
Ambala Field Ambulance
Lucknow Field Ambulance

== 2nd Indian Cavalry Division ==
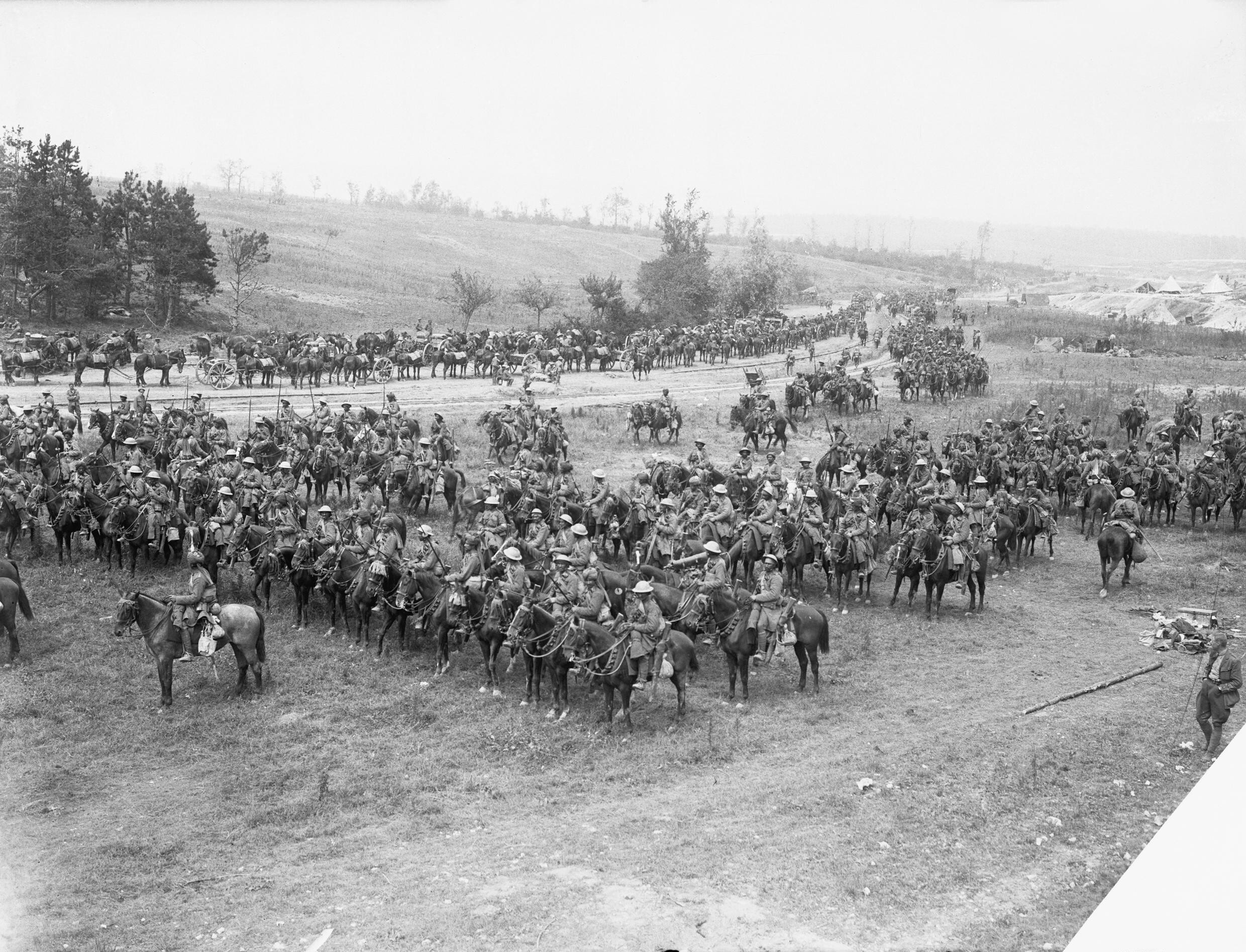
Deccan Horse, Bazentin Ridge in July 1916

Arrived in France 14 December 1914

Commander Major-General G.A. Cookson
GSO 1 Lieutenant-Colonel L.C. Jones
Commander Royal Horse Artillery Lieutenant-Colonel H F Askwith
Commander Royal Engineers Lieutenant-Colonel H J M Marshall

=== 5th (Mhow) Cavalry Brigade ===
Colonel M E Willoughby

- 6th (Inniskilling) Dragoons
- 2nd Lancers (Gardner's Horse)
- 38th King George's Own Central India Horse
- Signal troop

=== 7th (Meerut) Cavalry Brigade ===
Brigadier-General FitzJ.M. Edwards

- 13th Hussars
- 3rd Skinner's Horse
- 18th King George's Own Tiwana Lancers
- Signal Troop

=== 9th (Secunderabad) Cavalry Brigade ===
Arrived in France with the Indian Corps 12 October 1914 attached Indian Cavalry Corps 23 December 1914.

Brigadier-General F.W.G. Wadeson

- 7th (Princess Royal's) Dragoon Guards
- 20th Deccan Horse
- 34th Prince Albert Victor's Own Poona Horse
- Signal Troop

=== 2nd Indian Cavalry Division Troops ===
II Indian Brigade, Royal Horse Artillery

N Battery, RHA, arrived in France with the 9th (Secunderabad) Cavalry Brigade
V Battery, RHA
X Battery, RHA

II Brigade Ammunition Column

E Section arrived 5 January 1915
F Section arrived 5 January 1915
H Section

1st Indian Field Troop Royal Engineers
3rd Indian Signal Squadron
2nd Indian Cavalry Supply Column
Mhow Cavalry Field Ambulance
Meerut Cavalry Field Ambulance
Secunderabad Cavalry Field Ambulance, arrived in France with the 9th (Secunderabad) Cavalry Brigade

== See also ==
- British Cavalry Corps order of battle 1914

== Bibliography ==
- Edmonds, J.E. (1925). Military Operations France and Belgium, 1914: Antwerp, La Bassée, Armentières, Messines and Ypres October–November 1914. History of the Great War Based on Official Documents by Direction of the Historical Section of the Committee of Imperial Defence. Vol. II (1st ed.). London: Macmillan. ISBN 978-184574717-6. OCLC 220044986.
