= 3rd Indian Cavalry Brigade =

3rd Indian Cavalry Brigade may refer to

- 3rd (Ambala) Cavalry Brigade of the British Indian Army in the First World War
- 3rd (Meerut) Cavalry Brigade of the British Indian Army in the Second World War
