= 252nd Brigade =

252nd Brigade may refer to:

- 252nd Indian Armoured Brigade, British India
- 252nd Brigade, Royal Field Artillery, United Kingdom
