= Aizlewood =

Aizlewood is a surname of Welsh origin. Notable people with the surname include:

- John Aldam Aizlewood (1895–1990), British Indian Army general
- Mark Aizlewood (born 1959), Welsh footballer and manager
- Steve Aizlewood (1952–2013), Welsh footballer
