= Charles Levinge Gregory =

British Indian Army general (1870–1944)

Major-General Charles Levinge Gregory CB CMG
- Born: 22 August 1870; Callan, County Kilkenny, Ireland
- Died: 24 July 1944 (aged 73); Minehead, Somerset, England,
- Military career
- Allegiance: United Kingdom
- Branch: British Indian Army
- Service years: 1889–1923
- Rank: Major-General
- Commands: 19th Lancers (Fane's Horse); 9th (Secunderabad) Cavalry Brigade; 11th Cavalry Brigade; 4th (Meerut) Cavalry Brigade
- Awards: Order of St Michael and St George; Order of the Bath

Charles Levinge Gregory CB CMG (22 August 1870 – 24 July 1944) was an officer in the British Army and a Major-General in the British Indian Army.

After graduating from the Royal Military College, Sandhurst, Gregory was initially commissioned in the Royal Irish Fusiliers but soon after transferred to the Indian Army's 19th Lancers (Fane's Horse).

He served on campaigns on the North West Frontier and in the First World War, at first in France on the Western Front and then in the Sinai and Palestine campaign, during which he commanded the 9th (Secunderabad) Cavalry Brigade and the 11th Cavalry Brigade. After the war he commanded the 4th (Meerut) Cavalry Brigade in India before retiring in 1923.

== Early life ==
Charles Levinge Gregory was born 22 August 1870 at Callan, County Kilkenny in Ireland, the son of Henry Charles Gregory and Charlotte Anne Stevenson. He went to Corrig School, in Kingstown, County Dublin and then to the Royal Military College, Sandhurst, in Berkshire, England.

== Military career ==
Gregory graduated from Sandhurst in 1889 and was commissioned as a second-lieutenant in the Royal Irish Fusiliers, part of the British Army. In 1891, now a lieutenant, he transferred to the 19th Lancers (Fane's Horse) in the Indian Army.

In 1895 Gregory was attached to the Burma Military Police and was the Assistant Commandant of their Bhamo Battalion in 1899. Gregory married Irma Sara Harran, on 30 October 1900. Then in February 1901 he was promoted to captain. In 1907 he became the Staff Captain of the 1st (Peshawar) Division, based at Cherat, during which he was promoted to major.

In 1908 he took part in the Bazar Valley campaign, for which he was mentioned in dispatches. Following which he became the Brigade Major for the Bannu Brigade. Then in September 1909 he became a Deputy Assistant Adjutant-General, and took part in the 1911 Delhi Durbar. His next military position was as a General Staff Officer, Headquarters, Southern Army between 1912 and 1914, before taking over command of the 19th Lancers (Fane's Horse).

At the start of the First World War the 19th Lancers, assigned to the 2nd (Sialkot) Cavalry Brigade, were sent to the Western Front in France. He was promoted to lieutenant-colonel in November 1915. In 1916 he was given command of the 9th (Secunderabad) Cavalry Brigade, in the 2nd Indian Cavalry Division, seeing action at the Somme, Bazentin Ridge, Flers-Courcelette and Cambrai for which he was mentioned in dispatches four times. In 1917 he was promoted to brevet colonel. In 1918 all the Indian cavalry units in France were sent to serve in the Sinai and Palestine campaign. On arrival Gregory was given command of the 11th Cavalry Brigade, in the 4th Cavalry Division. The brigade fought at Megiddo and took part in the capture of Damascus.

In June 1919 he was made a Companion of the Order of St Michael and St George. In that November, having reverted to his peacetime rank of colonel, he was again promoted to brigadier-general and invested as a Companion of the Order of the Bath. On 4 September 1922 he was promoted to major general and given command of the 4th (Meerut) Cavalry Brigade, his last position before retiring in 1923.

Charles Levinge Gregory died on 24 July 1944 at a Nursing Home in Minehead, Somerset, England.
