= 3rd (Meerut) Cavalry Brigade =

British Indian military unit

14th (Meerut) Cavalry Brigade 4th (Meerut) Cavalry Brigade 3rd Indian Cavalry Brigade 3rd (Meerut) Cavalry Brigade
- Active: 21 November 1914 – February 1940
- Country: British India
- Allegiance: British Crown
- Branch: British Indian Army
- Type: Cavalry
- Size: Brigade
- Part of: 7th Meerut Divisional Area; Meerut District
- Garrison/HQ: Meerut
- Service: First World War; Third Anglo-Afghan War; Second World War

Commanders
- Notable commanders: Maj.-Gen. C.L. Gregory; Brig. J.A. Aizlewood

The 4th (Meerut) Cavalry Brigade was a cavalry brigade of the British Indian Army that formed part of the Indian Army during the First World War. It was formed as 14th (Meerut) Cavalry Brigade in November 1914 to replace the original Meerut Cavalry Brigade that had been mobilized as the 7th (Meerut) Cavalry Brigade for service on the Western Front. It remained in India throughout the war, before taking part in the Third Anglo-Afghan War in 1919.

The brigade continued to exist between the wars and by September 1939 it was designated 3rd (Meerut) Cavalry Brigade. It briefly served as part of the Indian Army during the Second World War before being broken up in February 1940.

== History ==
=== First World War ===
At the outbreak of the First World War, the Meerut Cavalry Brigade was part of the 7th (Meerut) Division. It was mobilized in August 1914 as the 7th (Meerut) Cavalry Brigade, assigned to the newly formed 2nd Indian Cavalry Division and sailed from Bombay on 19 October for the Western Front. Likewise, the 7th (Meerut) Division was transferred to France in August 1914.

The 7th Meerut Divisional Area was formed in September 1914 to take over the area responsibilities of the 7th (Meerut) Division and on 21 November 1914 (Note: The first commanding officer was appointed on 21 November 1914.) a new 14th (Meerut) Cavalry Brigade was formed in 7th Meerut Divisional Area to replace the original brigade. It was renumbered as the 4th (Meerut) Cavalry Brigade in February 1915. (Note: By February 1915, the Indian Army included the following cavalry brigades: 1st (Risalpur) Cavalry Brigade; 2nd (Sialkot) Cavalry Brigade; 3rd (Ambala) Cavalry Brigade; 5th (Mhow) Cavalry Brigade; 6th Indian Cavalry Brigade; 7th (Meerut) Cavalry Brigade; 8th (Lucknow) Cavalry Brigade; 9th (Secunderabad) Cavalry Brigade; Secunderabad Cavalry Brigade; Therefore, the 4th (Meerut) Cavalry Brigade took the vacant number.) The brigade served with the division in India throughout the First World War.

=== Between the world wars ===
In May 1919, the brigade was mobilized to take part in the Third Anglo-Afghan War.

The brigade continued to exist between the world wars. In September 1920 it was redesignated as the 3rd Indian Cavalry Brigade and later in the decade it became the 3rd (Meerut) Cavalry Brigade.

=== Second World War ===
At the outbreak of the Second World War, the brigade was under the command of Meerut District. The brigade was broken up in February 1940. Its Headquarters and some units formed the nucleus of The Armoured Brigade (later 2nd Indian Armoured Brigade).

== Orders of battle ==
First World War units
The 4th (Meerut) Cavalry Brigade commanded the following units in the First World War:
- 14th (King's) Hussars (arrived in September 1914 from Mhow and joined the brigade on formation; left in October 1915 for the 6th Indian Cavalry Brigade in Mesopotamia)
- 21st Prince Albert Victor's Own Cavalry (Frontier Force) (arrived in October 1914 from Jhelum, 2nd (Rawalpindi) Division and joined the brigade on formation; left in March 1915 for Lahore)
- 12th Cavalry (joined in November 1914 from Fyzabad, 8th (Lucknow) Division; left in December 1915 for Mesopotamia where it joined 15th Indian Division in August 1916; rejoined in December 1918 from Mesopotamia)
- 11th King Edward's Own Lancers (Probyn's Horse) (at Delhi in 7th (Meerut) Division in August 1914 and attached to the brigade in June 1915; left in February 1916 for Derajat Brigade)
- Bhopal Lancers (I.S.) (joined in May 1915; left in March 1918 for Derajat Brigade)
- 7th (Queen's Own) Hussars (joined in October 1915 from Secunderabad Cavalry Brigade; left in November 1917 for the 11th Indian Cavalry Brigade in Mesopotamia)
- W Battery, Royal Horse Artillery (joined in February 1915 from Sialkot, 2nd (Rawalpindi) Division; left in November 1917 for the 11th Indian Cavalry Brigade in Mesopotamia)
- 1st (King's) Dragoon Guards (joined in November 1917 from 8th (Lucknow) Cavalry Brigade, 1st Indian Cavalry Division on the Western Front; left in August 1918 for 1st (Risalpur) Cavalry Brigade, 1st (Peshawar) Division)
- 25th Cavalry (Frontier Force) (joined in March 1918 from East Africa)
- 21st (Empress of India's) Lancers (joined in August 1918 from 1st (Risalpur) Cavalry Brigade, 1st (Peshawar) Division)
- X Battery, Royal Horse Artillery (joined in January 1918) (Note: X Battery, Royal Horse Artillery had served with the II Indian Brigade, Royal Horse Artillery / XVII Brigade, Royal Horse Artillery in 2nd Indian Cavalry Division on the Western Front from December 1914.)

Third Anglo-Afghan War units
July 1918 plans saw the brigade mobilizing with the following units: 1st (King's) Dragoon Guards; 25th Cavalry (Frontier Force); 39th King George's Own Central Indian Horse; X Battery, Royal Horse Artillery; 23rd Machine Gun Squadron; 3rd Field Troop, 2nd Queen Victoria's Own Madras Miners and Sappers	In the event, the brigade mobilized in May 1919 with: 21st (Empress of India's) Lancers; 13th Duke of Connaught's Lancers (Watson's Horse); 14th Murray's Jat Lancers; X Battery, Royal Horse Artillery; 3rd Field Troop, 2nd Queen Victoria's Own Madras Miners and Sappers (Note: This order of battle is questionable. Neither the 21st (Empress of India's) Lancers nor the 14th Murray's Jat Lancers) took part in the war nor were they awarded the Afghanistan 1919 battle honour. On the other hand, the 13th Duke of Connaught's Lancers (Watson's Horse) did earn the battle honour.)

Second World War units
The 3rd (Meerut) Cavalry Brigade commanded the following units in the Second World War:
- 18th King Edward VII's Own Cavalry (pre-war; remained at Meerut)
- Central India Horse (21st King George V's Own Horse) (pre-war; left in November 1939 for mechanization and training at Secunderabad)
- 1st Battalion, Royal Warwickshire Regiment (pre-war; left in October 1939 for Razmak Brigade)
- 3rd Cavalry Brigade Signals Troop (pre-war; to The Armoured Brigade in February 1940)
- Hodson's Horse (4th Duke of Cambridge's Own Lancers) (joined in November 1939 from Zhob Brigade; to The Armoured Brigade in February 1940)
- 14th/20th King's Hussars (joined in November 1939 from 4th (Secunderabad) Cavalry Brigade)
- 10th Battalion, 2nd Punjab Regiment (Note: 10th Battalion, 2nd Punjab Regiment was the Training Battalion / Regimental Centre of the 2nd Punjab Regiment.)
- 11th Field Regiment, RA (left India on 2 August 1941 with 8th Indian Infantry Division)
  - 78th, 83rd, 85th Batteries
- 3rd Indian Divisional Signals
- 11th Battalion, 9th Jat Regiment, ITF (Meerut Area)

== Commanders ==
The 14th (Meerut) Cavalry Brigade / 4th (Meerut) Cavalry Brigade / 3rd Indian Cavalry Brigade / 3rd (Meerut) Cavalry Brigade had the following commanders:

From	Rank	Name	Notes
21 November 1914	Brigadier-General	H.L. Roberts	
18 June 1915	Colonel	R.C. Stephen	
29 March 1916	Brigadier-General	H.L. Roberts	
April 1916	Lieutenant-Colonel	C.E.G. Norton	
July 1916	Brigadier-General	H.L. Roberts	
May 1920	Major-General	C.L. Gregory	
March 1924	Brigadier-General	H.A. Tomkinson	
August 1927	Brigadier	E.D. Giles	
July 1929	Brigadier	C.B. Dashwood Strettell	
April 1932	Brigadier	E.M. Dorman	
April 1936	Brigadier	J.N. Lumley	
August 1939	Brigadier	J.A. Aizlewood	Broken up in February 1940

== A note on numbering ==
The brigade carried several numbers during its existence. This can be a cause for confusion as other, unrelated, Indian cavalry brigades carried the same numbers at different times:

- the brigade was numbered as 14th from November 1914 to February 1915. Another 14th Cavalry Brigade was formed in April 1918 by merging elements of the 9th (Secunderabad) Cavalry Brigade (withdrawn from the Western Front) with the British yeomanry 7th Mounted Brigade in Egypt. It served in the Sinai and Palestine Campaign and was broken up in September 1919.
- the brigade was numbered as 4th from February 1915 to September 1920, when it was renumbered as 3rd Indian Cavalry Brigade. At this point, the Lucknow Cavalry Brigade was numbered as the 4th Indian Cavalry Brigade, until it was broken up in 1923. As a result, the 5th Indian Cavalry Brigade (former Secunderabad Cavalry Brigade) was renumbered as the 4th Indian Cavalry Brigade and later as the 4th (Secunderabad) Cavalry Brigade.
- the brigade was numbered as 3rd from September 1920 to February 1940. The Ambala Cavalry Brigade had mobilized in August 1914 as 3rd (Ambala) Cavalry Brigade and served on the Western Front until it was broken up in March 1918. Another 3rd Indian Cavalry Brigade was formed in Mesopotamia after the end of the war for occupation duties. It drew, in part, on units that had earlier served in the Mesopotamian Campaign. It was broken up in late 1920.

== See also ==
- List of Indian Army Brigades in World War II

== Bibliography ==
- Gaylor, John (1996). Sons of John Company: The Indian and Pakistan Armies 1903–1991 (2nd ed.). Tunbridge Wells: Parapress. ISBN 1-898594-41-4.
- Joslen, Lt-Col H.F. (1990) [1st. Pub. HMSO:1960]. Orders of Battle, Second World War, 1939–1945. London: London Stamp Exchange. ISBN 0-948130-03-2.
- Kempton, Chris (2003b). 'Loyalty & Honour', The Indian Army September 1939 – August 1947. Vol. Part II Brigades. Milton Keynes: The Military Press. ISBN 0-85420-238-2.
- Kempton, Chris (2003c). 'Loyalty & Honour', The Indian Army September 1939 – August 1947. Vol. Part III. Milton Keynes: The Military Press. ISBN 0-85420-248-X.
- Mackie, Colin (June 2015). "Army Commands 1900-2011" (PDF). www.gulabin.com. Archived from the original (PDF) on 5 July 2015.
- Nafziger, George (n.d.). "The Indian Army 3 September 1939" (PDF). Fort Leavenworth: Combined Arms Research Library, United States Army Combined Arms Center.
- Perry, F.W. (1993). Order of Battle of Divisions Part 5B. Indian Army Divisions. Newport: Ray Westlake Military Books. ISBN 1-871167-23-X.
