= 9th (Secunderabad) Cavalry Brigade =

Secunderabad Cavalry Brigade 9th (Secunderabad) Cavalry Brigade
- Active: 17 September 1907 – March 1918
- Country: British India
- Allegiance: British Crown
- Branch: British Indian Army
- Type: Cavalry
- Size: Brigade
- Part of: 9th (Secunderabad) Division; 1st Indian Cavalry Division; 2nd Indian Cavalry Division
- Peacetime HQ: Bolarum
- Engagements: First World War Western Front Battle of La Bassée Battle of Armentières Battle of Givenchy Battle of the Somme (1916) Battle of Bazentin Battle of Flers–Courcelette Battle of Cambrai (1917)

Commanders
- Notable commanders: Br.-Gen. M.F. Rimington; Br.-Gen. C.L. Gregory

The Secunderabad Cavalry Brigade was a cavalry brigade of the British Indian Army formed in 1907 as a result of the Kitchener Reforms. It was mobilized as 9th (Secunderabad) Cavalry Brigade at the outbreak of the First World War and departed for France. It served on the Western Front as part of the 1st and 2nd Indian Cavalry Divisions until it was broken up in March 1918.

== History ==
The Kitchener Reforms, carried out during Lord Kitchener's tenure as Commander-in-Chief, India (1902–09), completed the unification of the three former Presidency armies, the Punjab Frontier Force, the Hyderabad Contingent and other local forces into one Indian Army. Kitchener identified the Indian Army's main task as the defence of the North-West Frontier against foreign aggression (particularly Russian expansion into Afghanistan) with internal security relegated to a secondary role. The Army was organized into divisions and brigades that would act as field formations but also included internal security troops.

The Secunderabad Cavalry Brigade was formed on 17 September 1907 (Note: 17 September 1907 was the appointment date of the brigade's first commanding officer.) as a result of the Kitchener Reforms. The brigade formed part of the 9th (Secunderabad) Division.

9th (Secunderabad) Cavalry Brigade

At the outbreak of the First World War, the Secunderabad Cavalry Brigade was still part of the 9th (Secunderabad) Division. It was mobilized in August 1914 as the 9th (Secunderabad) Cavalry Brigade with the first elements of Indian Expeditionary Force A. It was composed of one British (7th (Princess Royal's) Dragoon Guards) and two Indian (20th Deccan Horse and 34th Prince Albert Victor's Own Poona Horse) cavalry regiments; it sailed with N Battery, Royal Horse Artillery, Secunderabad Cavalry Brigade Field Ambulance, H Section Ammunition Column and 1st Field Troop, 1st King George's Own Sappers and Miners.

It paused briefly in Egypt before arriving in France on 12 October 1914 where it was attached to the Indian Corps and then to the 1st Indian Cavalry Division in November. At this time, just the 3rd (Ambala) Cavalry Brigade had reached the Front: the other two brigades of the division – 2nd (Sialkot) and 8th (Lucknow) – had been held up after arrival in France by horse sickness and did not reach the Front until 8 – 10 December. While in France, the brigade was known by its geographical rather than numerical designation so as to avoid confusion with the British 9th Cavalry Brigade also serving on the Western Front at the same time.

Among the brigade's engagements in 1914 were the Battle of La Bassée, the Battle of Armentières and the Battle of Givenchy. On 24 November, Lieutenant Frank de Pass of the 34th Prince Albert Victor's Own Poona Horse won the Victoria Cross at Festubert.

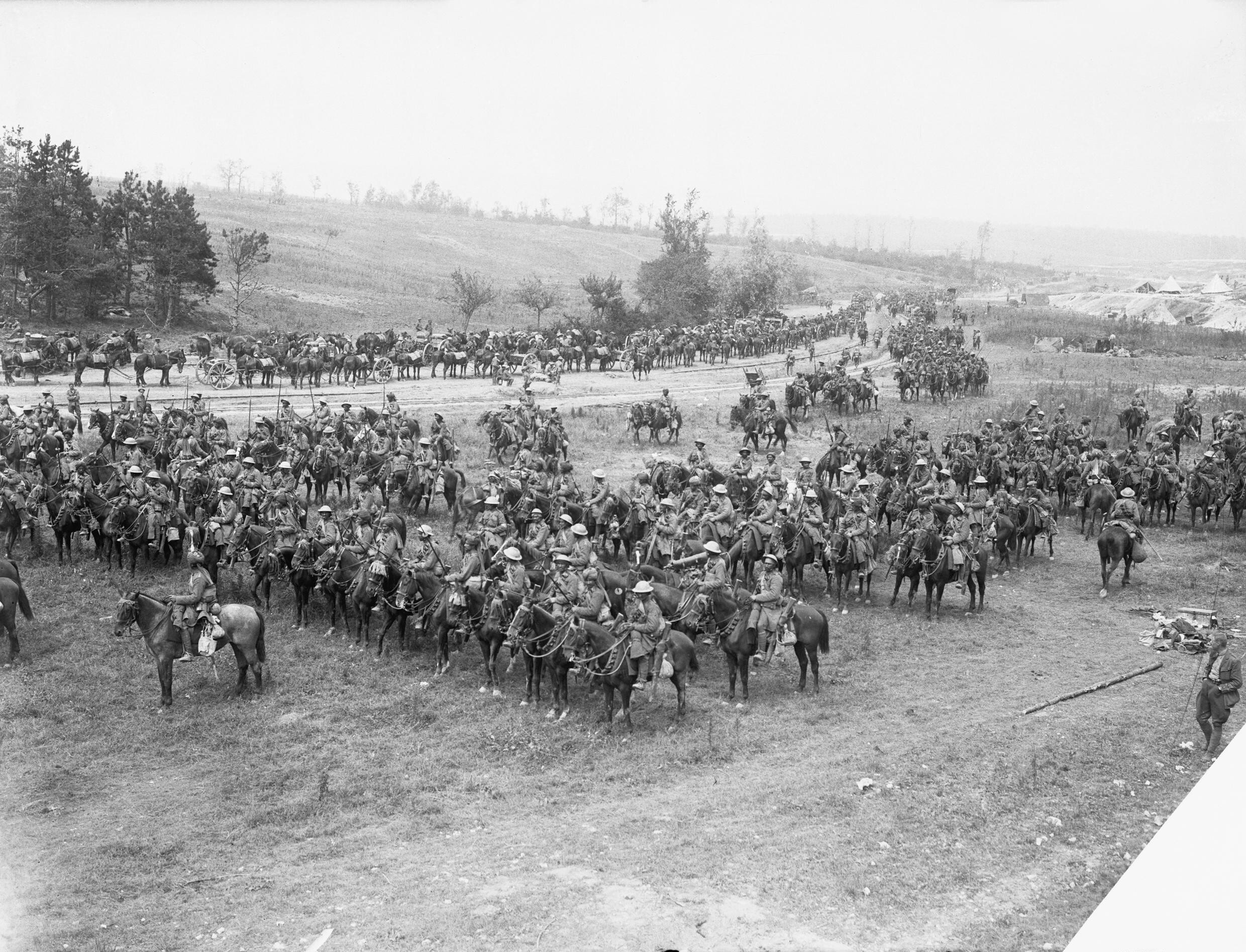
Battle of Bazentin Ridge, Battle of the Somme: the 20th Deccan Horse drawn up in ranks in the Carnoy Valley waiting for the opportunity to attack.

The brigade was assigned to the 2nd Indian Cavalry Division on 23 December 1914 and remained with it until broken up in Match 1918.

In 1916, the brigade took part in the Battle of the Somme, notably the Battle of Bazentin (14 – 17 July) and the Battle of Flers–Courcelette (15 – 22 September). In 1917, the brigade took part in the Battle of Cambrai, notably the Tank Attack (20 – 21 November) and the German Counter-attacks (30 November – 3 December). At other times it was held in reserve in case of a breakthrough, although it did send parties to the trenches on a number of occasions. They would hold the line, or act as Pioneers; such parties were designated as the Secunderabad Battalion.

Dissolved

In March 1918, the brigade was broken up in France. The British units (7th (Princess Royal's) Dragoon Guards and N Battery, Royal Horse Artillery) remained in France and the Indian elements were sent to Egypt. On 24 April 1918, these were merged with the 7th Mounted Brigade and joined the new 2nd Mounted Division. On 22 July 1918 the 7th Mounted Brigade was redesignated as 14th Cavalry Brigade and the division as 5th Cavalry Division.

== Orders of battle ==
In India in August 1914
At the outbreak of the First World War, the brigade had the following composition:
- 7th (Princess Royal's) Dragoon Guards
- 7th (Queen's Own) Hussars (to Bangalore in August 1914)
- 20th Deccan Horse
- 26th King George’s Own Light Cavalry (to Bangalore in August 1914)
- 34th Prince Albert Victor's Own Poona Horse

Western Front
The brigade's composition on the Western Front included:
- 7th (Princess Royal's) Dragoon Guards
- 20th Deccan Horse
- 34th Prince Albert Victor's Own Poona Horse
- N Battery, Royal Horse Artillery (Note: N Battery, Royal Horse Artillery joined from IX Brigade, Royal Horse Artillery at Secunderabad and sailed from India with the brigade. It was assigned to II Indian Brigade, Royal Horse Artillery but in practice was permanently attached to the brigade.)
- Secunderabad Cavalry Brigade Field Ambulance (sailed from India with the brigade; joined 2nd Indian Cavalry Division in December 1914)
- H Section Ammunition Column (sailed from India with the brigade; joined 2nd Indian Cavalry Division in December 1914)
- 1st Field Troop, 1st King George's Own Sappers and Miners (sailed from India with the brigade; joined 2nd Indian Cavalry Division in December 1914)
- Jodhpur Lancers (Imperial Service Troops) (attached September to December 1914 then joined Indian Cavalry Corps troops)
- Jodhpur Cavalry Field Ambulance (attached September to December 1914 then joined Indian Cavalry Corps troops)
- 13th Machine Gun Squadron (joined on 29 February 1916) (Note: 13th Machine Gun Squadron was formed on 29 February 1916 by combining the machine gun sections of the 7th (Princess Royal's) Dragoon Guards, 20th Deccan Horse and 34th Prince Albert Victor's Own Poona Horse.)

== Commanders ==
The Secunderabad Cavalry Brigade / 9th (Secunderabad) Cavalry Brigade had the following commanders:

| From | Rank | Name | Notes |
|---|---|---|---|
| 17 September 1907 | Brigadier-General | M.F. Rimington | |
| May 1911 | Brigadier-General | E.B. Burton | |
| July 1912 | Brigadier-General | R. Wapshare | |
| 7 January 1913 | Major-General | F.W.G. Wadeson | |
| 1 May 1916 | Brigadier-General | C.L. Gregory | Brigade broken up in March 1918 |

== See also ==
- Indian Cavalry Corps order of battle First World War
- Indian Expeditionary Force A

== Bibliography ==
- Becke, Archibald F. (1936). Order of Battle of Divisions Part 2A. The Territorial Force Mounted Divisions and the 1st-Line Territorial Force Divisions (42–56). London: HMSO. OCLC 4405016.
- Gaylor, John (1996). Sons of John Company: The Indian and Pakistan Armies 1903–1991 (2nd ed.). Tunbridge Wells: Parapress. ISBN 1-898594-41-4.
- Griffith, Paddy (1998). British Fighting Methods in the Great War. Routledge. ISBN 978-0714634951.
- Haythornthwaite, Philip J. (1996). The World War One Source Book. London: Arms and Armour Press. ISBN 1-85409-351-7.
- Kempton, Chris (2003b). 'Loyalty & Honour', The Indian Army September 1939 – August 1947. Vol. Part II Brigades. Milton Keynes: The Military Press. ISBN 0-85420-238-2.
- Mackie, Colin (June 2015). "Army Commands 1900-2011" (PDF). www.gulabin.com. Archived from the original (PDF) on 5 July 2015.
- Perry, F.W. (1993). Order of Battle of Divisions Part 5B. Indian Army Divisions. Newport: Ray Westlake Military Books. ISBN 1-871167-23-X.
- Rinaldi, Richard A (2008). Order of Battle of the British Army 1914. Ravi Rikhye. ISBN 978-0-97760728-0.
