= John Aldam Aizlewood =

British and Indian Army officer (1895–1990)

Major-General John Aldan Aizlewood MC* DL
- Born: 4 January 1895; Sheffield, West Riding of Yorkshire, England
- Died: 27 September 1990 (aged 95); Cheltenham, Gloucestershire, England
- Military career
- Allegiance: United Kingdom
- Branch: British Army
- Service years: 1914–1945
- Rank: Major-General
- Service number: 13500
- Units: 4th (Royal Irish) Dragoon Guards; 4th/7th Royal Dragoon Guards
- Commands: 42nd Armoured Division; 30th Armoured Brigade; 29th Armoured Brigade; 2nd Indian Armoured Brigade Group; 3rd (Meerut) Cavalry Brigade; 4th/7th Royal Dragoon Guards
- Conflicts: First World War; Second World War
- Awards: Military Cross & Bar; Mentioned in Despatches (2)

Major-General John Aldam Aizlewood, MC & Bar, DL (4 January 1895 – 27 September 1990) was a senior British Army officer who served in the First and Second World Wars.

== Military career ==
John Aldan Aizlewood was commissioned into the 4th Royal Irish Dragoon Guards on 12 August 1914. He served in the First World War on the Western Front and was awarded the Military Cross (MC) and Bar while serving with the Machine Gun Corps. The citation for his MC, awarded in January 1918, reads:

For conspicuous gallantry and devotion to duty when with the leading troops of an advanced guard. Owing to his initiative and resource an enemy ammunition column was destroyed, a headquarters raided, and several officers, fifty men and two machine guns were captured.

The Bar to his MC, awarded in June, reads:

For conspicuous gallantry and devotion to duty. On the troops on his right flank withdrawing, he immediately organised a counter-attack, leading it himself, by which the lost ground was regained. He succeeded in (maintaining his position, displaying the greatest initiative and gallantry throughout a most trying period.

After the war, Aizlewood became a brigade major in India in 1927 and attended the Staff College, Quetta, from 1932 to 1933, alongside future generals John Grover and Edmund Hakewill-Smith. From 1936 to 1939 he was the commanding officer of the 4th/7th Royal Dragoon Guards. He was promoted colonel 1 August 1939 with seniority 25 May that year.

Aizlewood also served in the Second World War, initially becoming commander of the 3rd (Meerut) Cavalry Brigade in 1939. In August 1941 as part of Paiforce (formerly Iraqforce), Brigadier Aizlewood commanded Hazelforce and the 2nd Indian Armoured Brigade Group during the Anglo-Soviet invasion of Persia. He moved on to be commander of the 30th Armoured Brigade in August 1942 and then took responsibility for completing the conversion of the 42nd (East Lancashire) Infantry Division into a mechanised unit as the 42nd Armoured Division in December 1942.

Returning to the United Kingdom, Aizlewood was appointed commander of Essex and Suffolk District in late 1943 and acting General Officer Commanding-in-Chief for Eastern Command in 1944 while Sir Alan Cunningham was away: he retired 9 May 1945 as an honorary major general.

In retirement he was Colonel of the 4th/7th Royal Dragoon Guards from 1948 to 1958.

== Bibliography ==
- Smart, Nick (2005). Biographical Dictionary of British Generals of the Second World War. Barnesley: Pen & Sword. ISBN 1844150496.

Military offices
Preceded by Miles Dempsey	GOC 42nd Armoured Division; 1942–1943	Succeeded by Geoffrey Evans (as GOC 42nd (Lancashire) Division)
