= Michael Rimington =

British Army officer

Lieutenant-General Sir Michael Rimington KCB CVO
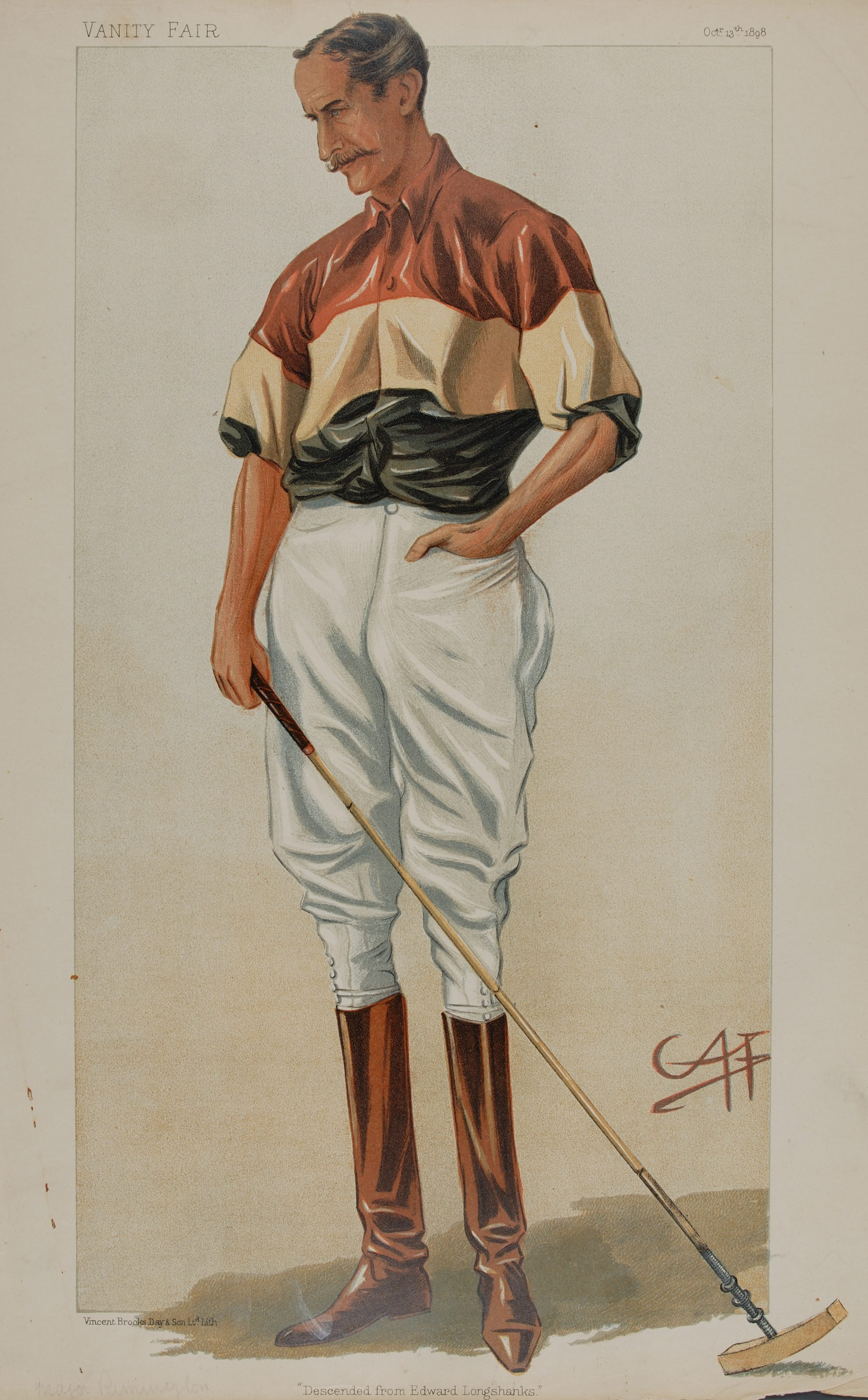
- A caricature of Rimington published in Vanity Fair, 1898. The original caption read "Descended from Edward Longshanks".
- Born: 23 May 1858; Penrith, Cumberland (now Cumbria), England
- Died: 19 December 1928 (aged 70)
- Military career
- Allegiance: United Kingdom
- Branch: British Army
- Service years: 1881–1919
- Rank: Lieutenant-General
- Nickname: "Mike"
- Commands: Indian Cavalry Corps; 1st Indian Cavalry Division; 3rd Cavalry Brigade; 6th (Inniskilling) Dragoons; Rimington's Guides
- Conflicts: Second Boer War; First World War
- Awards: Knight Commander of the Order of the Bath; Commander of the Royal Victorian Order; Mentioned in Despatches; Commander of the Legion of Honour (France)

Lieutenant-General Sir Michael Frederic Rimington, KCB, CVO (23 May 1858 – 19 December 1928) was a British Army officer who commanded cavalry forces in the Second Boer War and First World War. After early service with the 6th (Inniskilling) Dragoons, "Mike" Rimington was given command of an irregular cavalry force in South Africa, known as "Rimington's Guides". He commanded them for a year before taking command of his regular regiment, and later a cavalry brigade. In 1914, with the outbreak of the First World War, he commanded the 1st Indian Cavalry Division and then the Indian Cavalry Corps on the Western Front, before retiring to home-service duties in 1916. He had one son, Reginald, who followed his father into the 6th Dragoons; he rose to command an armoured brigade in 1941, and was killed in North Africa.

== Early career ==
Born in Penrith, Rimington attended Highgate School in London and then studied at Keble College, Oxford. He graduated from the Royal Military College, Sandhurst on 21 October 1881, and joined the army as a lieutenant in the 6th (Inniskilling) Dragoons. The regiment was stationed in South Africa, and Rimington's first active service was the Warren Expedition in 1884 to recapture the United States of Stellaland. He later served in the campaign against Dinizulu in 1888, as the regimental adjutant. He was promoted to the rank of Captain on 26 October 1887.

That year, he married Agnes Cunningham; they had one son, Reginald, who followed his father into the 6th Dragoons and later the Royal Tank Regiment. Reginald Rimington rose to command the 3rd Armoured Brigade during the early stages of the Second World War; he was taken prisoner in the German offensive of April 1941 in North Africa, and died of wounds on 10 April.

The Iniskillings returned to the United Kingdom in 1890, with Rimington remaining with them on regimental duties. He was promoted to major on augmentation on 3 April 1897, and the same year appointed to a staff position overseeing remounts. Around this point, he published his first book, Hints on Stable Management.

== Boer War ==
"He ought to have lived 500 years ago and dressed in chain-mail, and led out his lances to plunder and foray. Picturesque is the word that best describes him. He makes every one else look hopelessly commonplace. His men admire him immensely, like him a good deal, and fear him a little. Generals in command sometimes find him, I fancy, a bit of a handful, that is, if their policy is at all a backward one. He is essentially a man who means business, who believes that the Army is here to fight, and it is especially in action that he makes his value felt."

— An unidentified trooper of Rimington's Guides, quoted in his obituary.

As tensions increased in South Africa through 1899, Rimington was sent out in July on special service. He had only just arrived when the Second Boer War was declared in October, and was appointed to raise a force of irregular mounted scouts, known as Rimington's Guides, but more commonly nicknamed "Rimington's Tigers" for their habit of wearing wildcat fur bands on their hats.

He led the Guides as part of Lord Methuen's force, sent to relieve the siege of Kimberley, fighting at the battles of Belmont (23 November 1899), Enslin, Modder River (28 November 1899), and Magersfontein (11 December 1899). Under Sir John French he commanded them at the battles of Paardeberg (February 1900) and Poplar Grove (7 March 1900), as part of the march to Pretoria, and then at the battle of Diamond Hill in June 1900. The focus of the operations in the Orange Free State then shifted to irregular guerrilla warfare, and Rimington's troopers saw heavy service here until the end of the year. Rimington left the Guides in January 1901. The force was reorganised as Damant's Horse under Major Frederic Damant, Rimington's second-in-command, though they were often known by his name through the remainder of the war.

Rimington returned to the 6th Dragoons, following a promotion to lieutenant colonel on 29 September 1900, to take command of the regiment, and fought with them through the remainder of the war. For his services in South Africa, he was mentioned in despatches five times (including by Lord Roberts on 31 March 1900, and by Lord Kitchener on 23 June 1902), appointed a Companion of the Order of the Bath (CB) in the April 1901 South African honours list (the award was dated to 29 November 1900), and received the Queen's South Africa Medal and King's South Africa Medal with ten clasps. This last was the highest number of bars normally awarded for these campaign medals. He also received a brevet promotion to colonel in the South Africa honours list published on 26 June 1902. The war ended with the Peace of Vereeniging in early June 1902, and Rimington returned home in the SS Tagus, arriving at Southampton in July. In his last despatch as Commander-in-Chief in South Africa, dated 23 June 1902, Lord Kitchener described him the following way:

Brevet Colonel M. F. Rimington is a leader of mounted troops, who is particularly well qualified for the conduct of special and independent raids or enterprises. His knowledge of the theatre of operations, his energy, and his soldierly instincts have enabled him to render exception services.

He received the actual decoration of CB after his return home, from King Edward VII at Buckingham Palace on 24 October 1902.

== Later career ==
Following the war, Rimington was promoted to the substantive rank of colonel on 26 January 1903, and appointed in command of the 3rd Cavalry Brigade based at The Curragh the same month, with the temporary rank of brigadier general whilst so employed. In September 1907, upon once more being made a temporary brigadier general, he was given command of the Secunderabad Cavalry Brigade of the 9th (Secunderabad) Division in India.

He was promoted to major general on 7 September 1910. In March 1911, when his tenure in command of the brigade expired, he became the inspector general of cavalry units in India. In June 1912 he was appointed the ceremonial position of colonel of the 6th (Inniskilling) Dragoons, a position he would hold through their amalgamation into the 5th/6th Dragoons, and until his death. The same year, he published his second book, Our Cavalry, a summary of the contemporary role of cavalry "for junior officers of all arms".

He was appointed a Commander of the Royal Victorian Order (CVO) on 16 December 1911 at which time he was Inspector-General of Cavalry in India.

== First World War ==
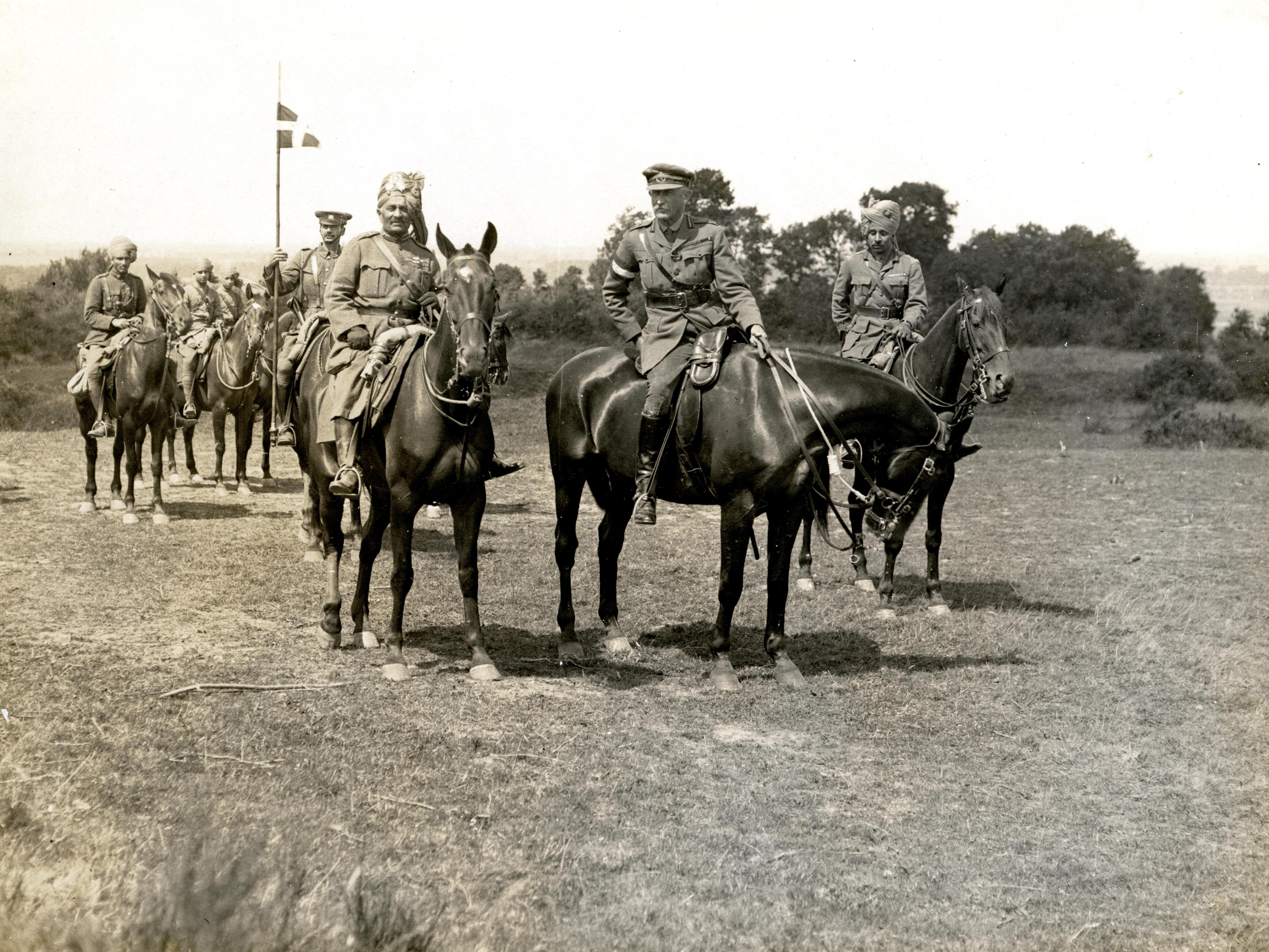
Rimington (second from right) riding alongside Pratap Singh and Sajjan Singh in Linghem, 28 July 1915

At the outbreak of the First World War, Rimington left his staff position to accompany the Indian Expeditionary Force to France, as commander of the 1st Indian Cavalry Division. With the arrival of a second division in December 1914, he was promoted to command the Indian Cavalry Corps, remaining with it until it was disbanded.

Following the disbandment of the corps, Rimington was given command of a reserve centre in the United Kingdom, from April 1916 to January 1918, and retired from the army in 1919.

For his services during the war, Rimington was knighted, appointed a Commander of the Legion of Honour, and twice mentioned in despatches.

== Notes ==
Military offices
Preceded by New formation	General Officer Commanding the 1st Indian Cavalry Division; October – December 1914	Succeeded by Hew Fanshawe
Preceded by New formation	General Officer Commanding the Indian Cavalry Corps; December 1914 – March 1916	Succeeded by Disbanded
