= I Corps (British India) =

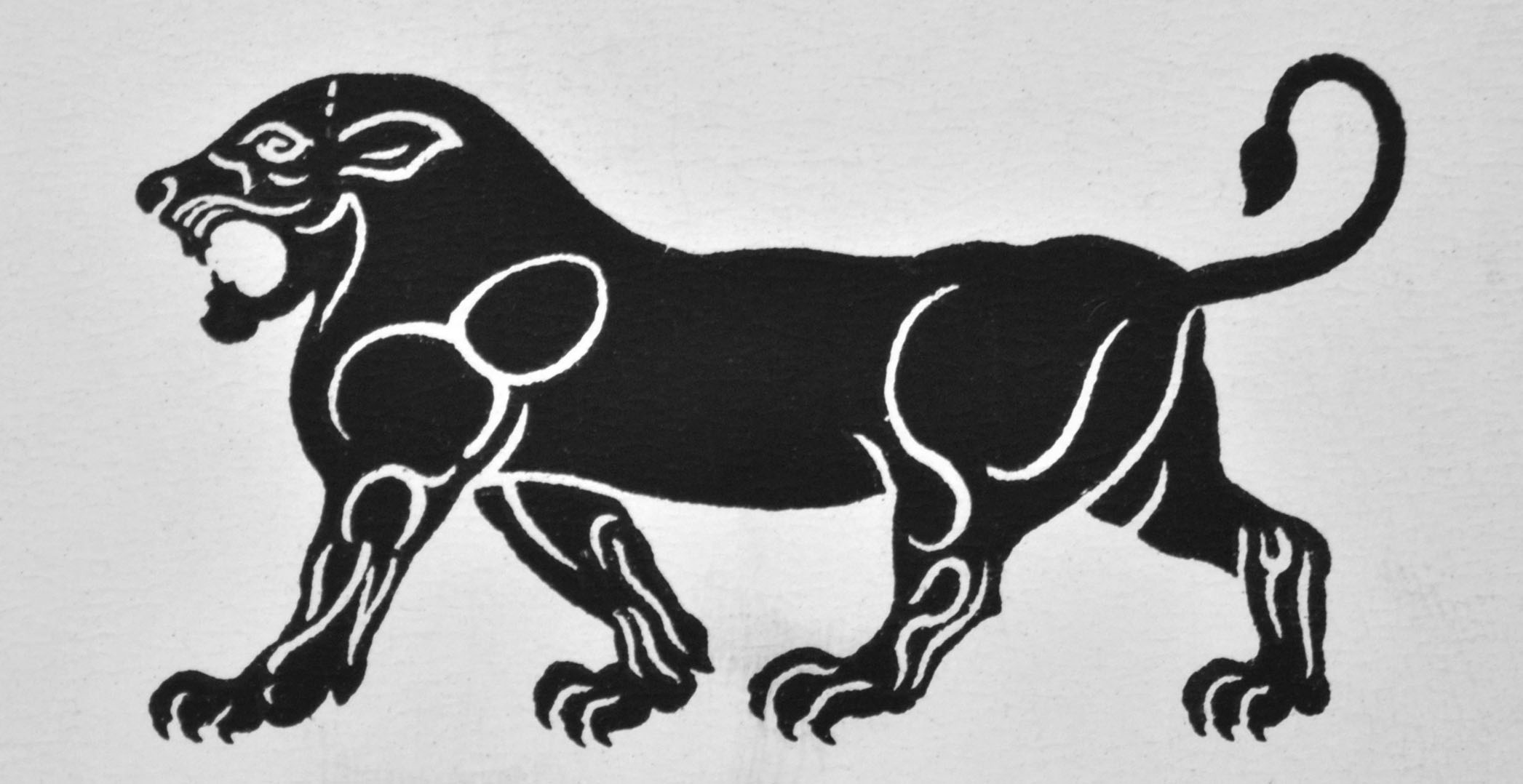
- I Indian Corps formation badge.
- Active: World War I
- Country: British India
- Branch: British Indian Army
- Type: Field corps
- Engagements: Western Front of World War I: Battle of La Bassée; First Battle of Messines; Battle of Armentières; Battle of Neuve Chapelle; Battle of Aubers Ridge; Battle of Festubert; Battle of Loos; Mesopotamian Campaign

Commanders
- Notable commanders: Lieutenant General Sir James Willcocks; Lieut-Gen Alexander Cobbe

The I Indian Corps was an army corps of the British Indian Army in the World War I. It was formed at the outbreak of war under the title Indian Corps from troops sent to the Western Front. The British Indian Army did not have a pre-war corps structure, and it held this title until further corps were created. It was withdrawn from the Western Front in December 1915 and reconstituted as I Indian Corps in Mesopotamia until the end of the war.

== Western Front ==
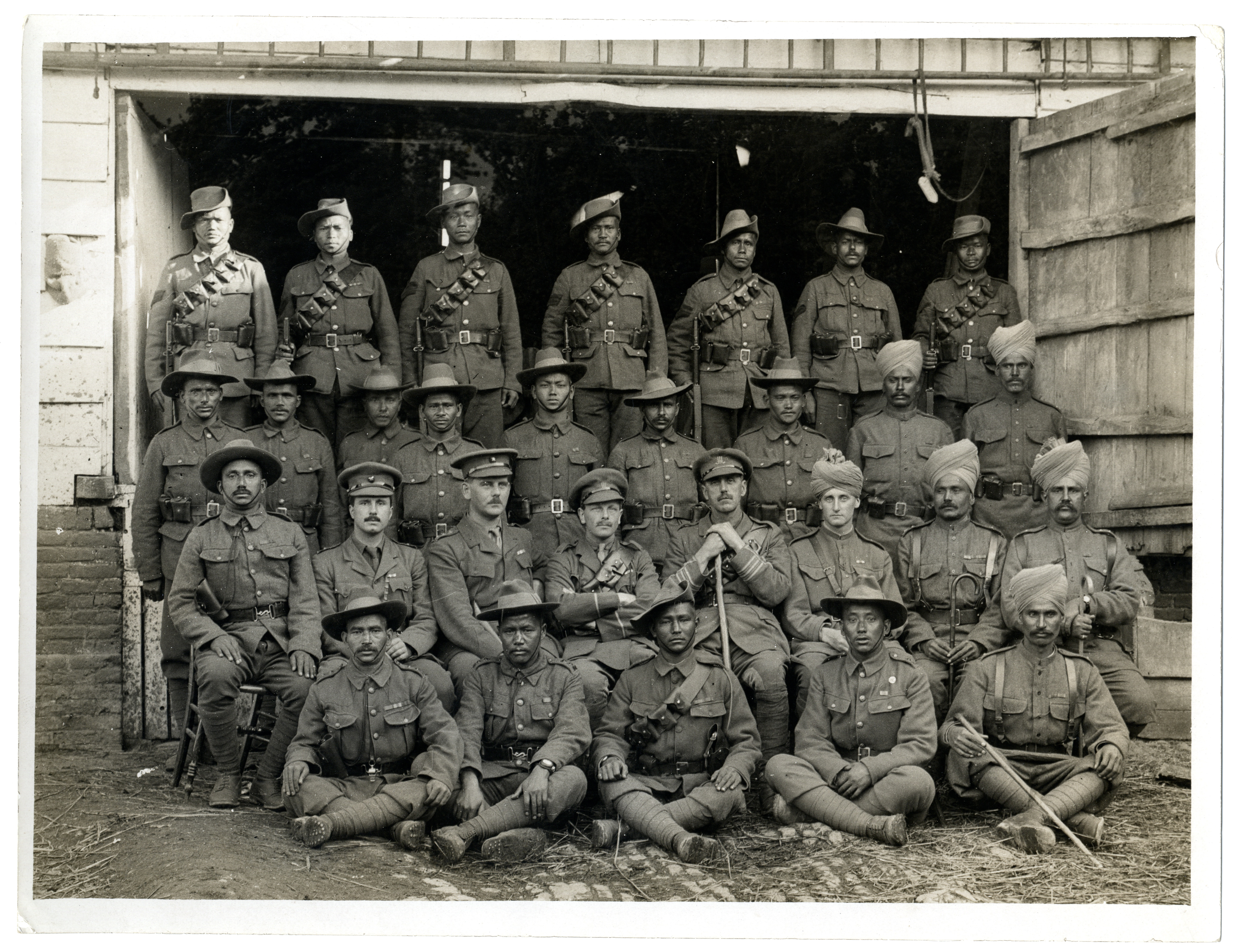
A group of soldiers from the Indian Corps who had been mentioned in dispatches during fighting on the Western Front

In 1914 Indian Expeditionary Force A was sent to reinforce the British Expeditionary Force (BEF) fighting in France. In France it formed the Indian Cavalry Corps and Indian Corps composed of 3rd (Lahore) and 7th (Meerut) Divisions. (In France, these formations were simply known as 'Lahore' and 'Meerut' Divisions, to distinguish them from the 3rd and 7th British divisions.) Despatch from India was delayed by the activities of the German raiders Emden and Königsberg operating in the Indian Ocean, and by the slow speed of the transport vessels. Lahore Division began landing at Marseille on 26 September 1914, but there were further delays while the troops were re-armed with the latest pattern rifle, and the supply train could be improvised, using tradesmens' vans procured locally. The corps finally got into action at the Battles of La Bassée, 1st Messines and Armentières in October–November 1914.

=== Order of Battle October–December 1914 ===
General Officer Commanding: Lieut-Gen Sir J. Willcocks, KCB, KCSI, KCMG, DSO
Brig-Gen, General Staff: Brig-Gen H. Hudson, CB, CIE
Brig-Gen, Royal Artillery: Brig-Gen H.F. Mercer, CB, ADC
Colonel, Royal Engineers: Col H.C. Nanton

- Lahore Division
- Meerut Division
- Divisional Troops (attached from 12 October, left to join Indian Cavalry Corps 23 December 1914)
  - 9th (Secunderabad) Cavalry Brigade
  - Signal Troop
  - N Battery Royal Horse Artillery
  - H Section Ammunition Column
  - 1st Indian Field Troop, 1st King George's Own Sappers & Miners
  - Jodhpur Lancers (Imperial Service Troops)
  - Jodhpur Cavalry Field Ambulance

=== Operations ===
- The Battles of La Bassée, 1st Messines and Armentières
- Winter operations 1914–15
- The Battle of Neuve Chapelle
- The Battles of Aubers Ridge and Festubert. At this period the corps was reinforced by 51st (Highland) Division of the Territorial Force in addition to 3rd (Lahore) and 7th (Meerut) divisions.
- The Battle of Loos

== Mesopotamia ==
On 13 August 1915, General Sir John Nixon, commanding Indian Expeditionary Force D in Mesopotamia, requested one of the Indian infantry divisions in France as reinforcements for his advance on Baghdad. Coincidentally, on the same day, the Secretary of State for India, Austen Chamberlain, told the Viceroy of India that he was anxious for the Indian infantry to be withdrawn from France before they had to endure another winter. The system for supplying drafts had broken down and the Indian battalions were becoming very weak after the heavy casualties they had suffered. Although the Secretary of State for War, Lord Kitchener, objected to their withdrawal from the Western Front, orders were issued on 31 October for the two divisions of Indian Corps (3rd (Lahore) and 7th (Meerut) Division) to embark at Marseilles for Mesopotamia. Indian Corps was relieved in the front line on 6 November by XI Corps and the two divisions were due at Basra in December, but their departure from Marseilles was delayed because of fear of submarine attack. 3rd (Lahore) Division finally arrived in Mesopotamia in April 1916 and joined Tigris Corps, too late to relieve 6th (Poona) Division at Kut-al-Amara.

== See also ==
- Mewar Bhil Corps

== External links and further reading ==
- India and the Western Front, Dr David Omissi, BBC History website
- Merewether, J. W. B.; Smith, F. E. (1919) [1917]. The Indian Corps in France (rev. ed.). OCLC 3774822.
- Corrigan, Gordon (2006). Sepoys in the Trenches: The Indian Corps on the Western Front 1914–15. Tempus. ISBN 1-86227-354-5.
