= Indian Cavalry Corps =

Formation of the British Indian Army

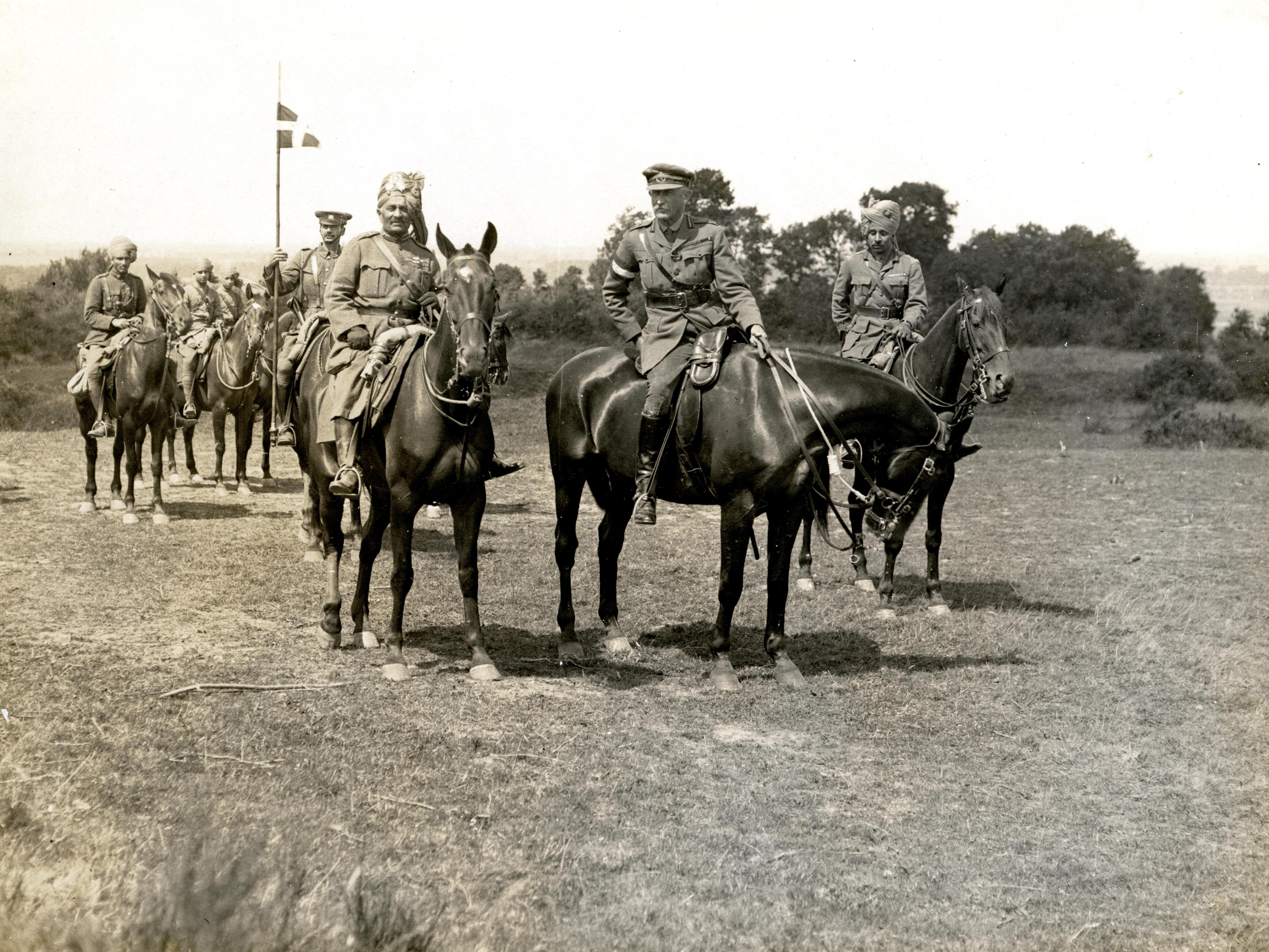
Michael Rimington riding alongside Pratap Singh and Sajjan Singh in Linghem, 28 July 1915

The Indian Cavalry Corps was a formation of the Indian Army during World War I. It was formed in France in December 1914. It remained in France until March 1916, when it was broken up. The corps consisted of the 1st Indian Cavalry Division and the 2nd Indian Cavalry Division, and together with the Indian Corps it formed Indian Expeditionary Force A.

The high number of officer casualties had an effect: British officers who understood the language, customs, and psychology of their men could not be quickly replaced; as well, the alien environment of the Western Front had an adverse effect on the soldiers.

Hew Fanshawe, from the 19th Hussars, commanded the 2nd Indian Cavalry Division in 1914. He was head of V Corps from 1915 to 1916.

== See also ==
- Indian Cavalry Corps order of battle First World War
- British cavalry during the First World War

== Sources ==
- Sumer, Mike; Konstan, Angus; Chappell, Mike (2001). The Indian Army 1914-194. Osprey Publishing. ISBN 1-84176-196-6.
- http://www.greatwar.co.uk/ypres-salient/memorial-indian-forces.htm - Indian Forces Memorial, Ypres
