= 252nd Indian Armoured Brigade =

- Active: 1940–1947
- Country: British India
- Allegiance: British Crown
- Branch: British Indian Army
- Size: Brigade

Commanders
- Notable commanders: Brig. G. Carr-White

The 252nd Indian Armoured Brigade was an armoured formation of the Indian Army. It was formed from the 3rd (Meerut) Cavalry Brigade when it was dispersed and reformed as the 2nd Indian Armoured Brigade in 1940, from July 1941 as 2nd Independent Armoured Brigade Group and the 252nd Indian Independent Armoured Brigade Group in December 1941. In January 1942 it was attached to the 10th Indian Infantry Division. Thereafter it served with the 31st Indian Armoured Division (from July 1942 redesignated 252nd Indian Armoured Brigade) in the Middle East until being redesignated 2nd Indian Independent Armoured Brigade in December 1945. It returned to India in January 1946 and was redesignated 2nd Armoured Brigade [Independent] in June 1946.

As 2nd Armoured Brigade [Independent] it was located in August 1947 at Ahmednagar. In October 1962 it was stationed at Babina. In 1965 it was part of XI Corps. In December 1971 it was placed under command of 39th Infantry Division. Assigned to new 31st Armoured Division 1972. An independent brigade again in 1992. Currently assigned to IX Corps.

== Units during World War II ==
- 4th Duke of Cambridge's Own Hodson's Horse
- 13th Duke of Connaught's Own Lancers
- 14th/20th Hussars
- 1st Battalion, 4th Bombay Grenadiers
- 15th Field Regiment Royal Artillery
- 32nd Field Squadron Indian Engineers

from May 1942

- Scinde Horse 14th Prince of Wales's Own Cavalry

== See also ==
- List of Indian Army Brigades in World War II
