= I Parachute Battery (Bull's Troop) Royal Horse Artillery =

British Army airborne artillery battery

- Active: 1 February 1805 – present
- Country: United Kingdom
- Branch: British Army
- Type: Parachute Artillery
- Role: Headquarters
- Size: Battery
- Part of: 7th Parachute Regiment Royal Horse Artillery
- Garrison/HQ: Merville Barracks, Colchester
- Anniversaries: Drivers Day 5 May
- Engagements: Napoleonic Wars; First World War; Second World War; Operation Telic; Operation Herrick
- Battle honours: Ubique

I Parachute Battery (Bull's Troop) Royal Horse Artillery is the Headquarters battery of 7th Parachute Regiment Royal Horse Artillery, part of the Royal Horse Artillery of the British Army, currently based in Merville Barracks, Colchester.

Formed in 1805, the battery took part in the Napoleonic Wars, notably in the Peninsular War and the Battle of Waterloo – for which service it was awarded its Honour Title as Bull's Troop – and the First and Second World Wars.

In 1961, it was given a parachute role as part of 7th Parachute Regiment Royal Horse Artillery and has seen considerable active service particularly in Northern Ireland (Operation Banner), the Balkans, Afghanistan and Iraq.

== History ==
=== Napoleonic Wars ===
The battery was formed on 1 February 1805 as I Troop, Royal Horse Artillery at Colchester, Essex as a horse artillery battery of the British Army. Captain Robert Bull was appointed to command and he took it to the Iberian Peninsula in August 1809 where it served until 1814. It arrived too late for the Battle of Talavera, but thereafter took part in most of Wellington's major actions of the Peninsular War including Bussaco (1810), Fuentes de Oñoro (1811), Ciudad Rodrigo, Badajoz, Salamanca, and Burgos (1812), Vitoria, San Sebastián, the Bidassoa and the Nive (1813) and Bayonne (1814).

Norman Ramsay (holding sword) leading the troop through French lines at the Battle of Fuentes de Oñoro

Its most famous action during the Peninsular War occurred at the Battle of Fuentes de Oñoro on 5 May 1811 when it was temporarily under the command of Lieutenant Norman Ramsay. (Note: Later, Captain Ramsay was killed at the Battle of Waterloo while leading H Battery (Ramsay's Troop) Royal Horse Artillery.) The troop was surrounded by French cavalry and cut off from the main force. With the guns limbered up and swords drawn, they charged through the surprised enemy horsemen thereby saving themselves from being captured.

Armed with six 5 1/2-inch howitzers, (Note: This was exceptional: other RHA batteries at Waterloo were armed with a combination of five 6-pounder guns and a single 5 1/2-inch howitzer or five 9-pounder guns and a single 5 1/2-inch howitzer.) it took part in the Hundred Days Campaign in 1815. Early in the Battle of Waterloo it was ordered to support the garrison at Hougoumont. Firing shrapnel over the heads of friendly troops, in 10 minutes it cleared a nearby wood of French tirailleurs, much to the satisfaction of Wellington and Frazer (commander of the horse artillery). It then took part in the advance to Paris and joined the Army of Occupation.

In commemoration of its performance in the Peninsular War and at the Battle of Waterloo, the Honour Title "Bull's Troop" was officially granted to the battery on 13 October 1926.

In the usual post-war reductions of the British Army, a number of troops of horse artillery were disbanded between 1815 and 1816, including D Troop (Beane's Troop) on 31 July 1816. The remaining troops were then moved up to assume the next available letter and the I Troop became H Troop on the same date.

=== Victorian era ===
The next forty years were spent in peacetime routine. The troop was not one of the three sent to take part in the Crimean War, (Note: 'Ball Cartridge Brigade', C Troop, and The Rocket Troop took part in the Crimean War, which today are designated as B, C, and O Batteries respectively.) nor one of the three dispatched to India in 1858 to assist in the final operations to quell the Indian Rebellion of 1857. (Note: D, E and F Troops were sent to India in 1858, which today are designated as E, D, and G Batteries respectively.) However, by 1 July 1859 it was in Madras when it was assigned to the Horse Brigade, Royal Artillery along with all the existing horse artillery batteries of the Royal Artillery. This was an administrative, rather than tactical, formation.

As a result of the Rebellion, the British Crown took direct control of India from the East India Company on 1 November 1858 under the provisions of the Government of India Act 1858. The Presidency armies transferred to the direct authority of the British Crown and its European units were transferred to the British Army. Henceforth artillery, the mutineers most effective arm, was to be the sole preserve of the British Army (with the exception of certain Mountain Artillery batteries). On 19 February 1862, the Horse Brigade RA became the 1st Horse Brigade RA and the Bengal, Madras and Bombay horse artillery formed the 2nd to 5th Horse Brigades. (Note: The 1st Brigade Bengal Horse Artillery became 2nd Horse Brigade RA, the Madras Horse Artillery became 3rd Horse Brigade RA, the Bombay Horse Artillery became 4th Horse Brigade RA and the 2nd Brigade Bengal Horse Artillery became 5th Horse Brigade RA. The 3rd Brigade Bengal Horse Artillery was split between 2nd and 5th Horse Brigades RA.)

The 1st Brigade with 10 batteries was much larger than the other four (with four to seven batteries each). Therefore, a reorganization of the Horse Artillery on 13 April 1864 saw 1st Brigade split as A and B Brigades. (Note: At the same time, 2nd Brigade become C Brigade, 3rd become D Brigade, 4th become E Brigade, and 5th become F Brigade.) The battery was moved to B Brigade, and as battery designations were tied to the brigade the battery was assigned to, it was redesignated as D Battery, B Brigade (or D/B Battery in short). The battery was at Aldershot at this time.

From 1866, the term "Royal Horse Artillery" appeared in Army List hence the battery was designated D Battery, B Brigade, Royal Horse Artillery from about this time. Another reorganization on 14 April 1877 saw the number of brigades reduced to three (of 10 batteries each); the battery – at Meerut – joined A Brigade and became I Battery, A Brigade. The number of brigades was further reduced to two (of 13 batteries each) in 1882 without effecting the designation of the battery by which time it was at Woolwich.

The brigade system was finally abolished on 1 July 1889. Henceforth, batteries were designated in a single alphabetical sequence in order of seniority from date of formation and the battery took on its final designation as I Battery, Royal Horse Artillery.

The battery did not take part in the Second Boer War. (Note: Of the 10 RHA batteries that took part in the Second Boer War: A, J and M Batteries were unbrigaded; Q, T and U Batteries were assigned to 1st Cavalry Brigade; G and P Batteries were assigned to 2nd Cavalry Brigade; O and R Batteries were assigned to 3rd Cavalry Brigade)

=== First World War ===
The brigade system was reintroduced on 1 March 1901, this time as tactical formations, and the battery was assigned to the VIII Brigade-Division, RHA (redesignated as VII Brigade, RHA on 1 October 1906) along with L Battery. In 1903, it was stationed at Secunderabad and in 1905 it took part in the Rawalpindi Parade.

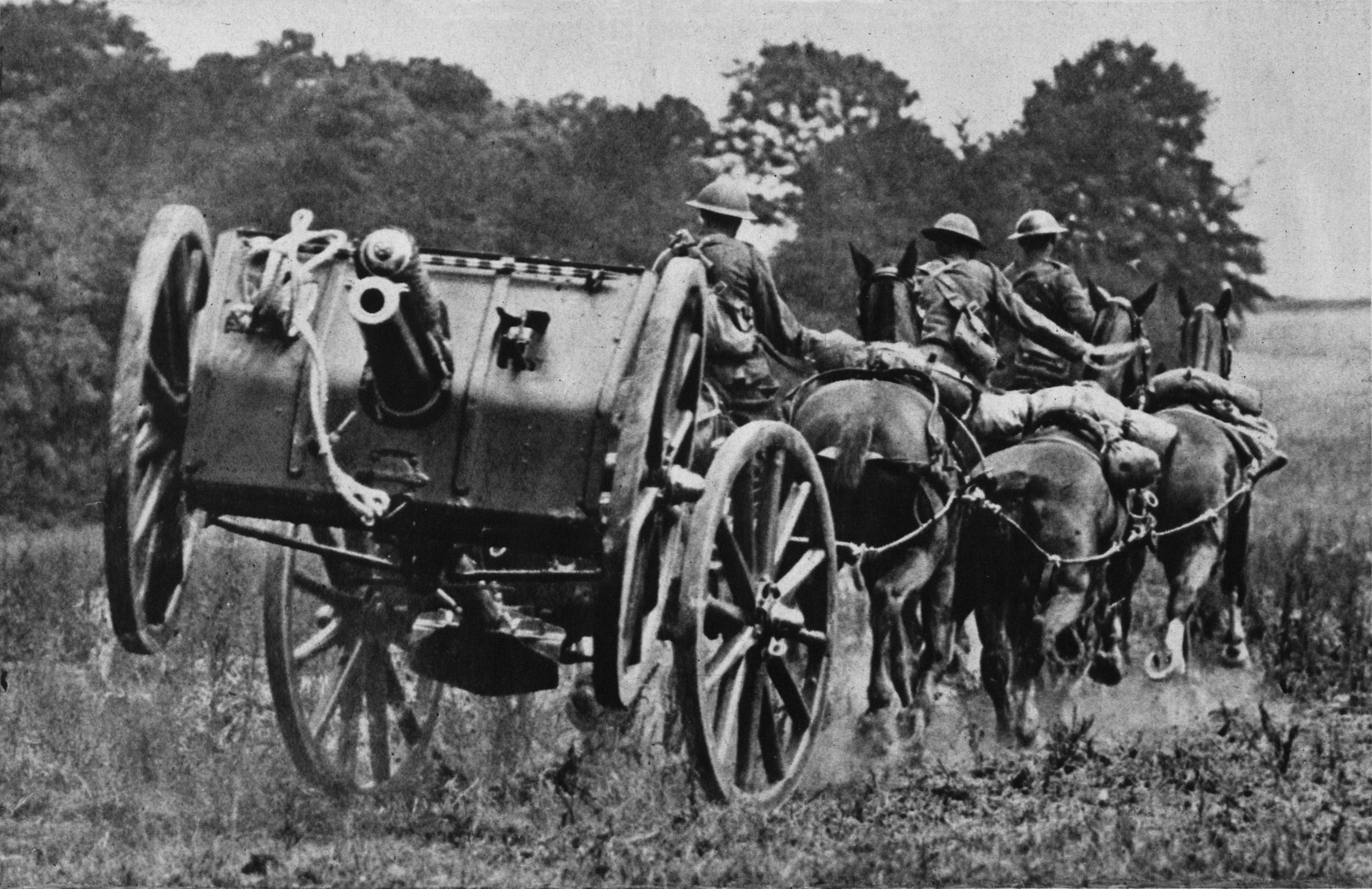
Photo showing 13 pounder gun team galloping into action.

By the time the First World War broke out, the battery had been re-equipped with six quick-firing 13 pounders and was stationed at Aldershot, still assigned to VII Brigade with L Battery and attached to the 1st Cavalry Brigade. On mobilization, it joined The Cavalry Division and served with it on the Western Front for the rest of the war. In practice, the batteries were permanently assigned to the cavalry brigades from September 1914 onwards and the battery was attached to 1st Cavalry Brigade on 17 September.

It crossed to France between 15 and 18 August 1914, concentrated with the division around Maubeuge between 18 and 20 August, and moved forward towards Mons on 21 August. Its first action was the Battle of Mons on 23 and 24 August where the division formed the left flank. It took part in the subsequent retreat, notably the Battle of Le Cateau, the action at Néry and the First Battle of the Marne, before advancing again to the First Battle of the Aisne and the Race to the Sea (Battle of Messines).

In 1915 it took part in the Second Battle of Ypres (Battle of Frezenberg, 9–13 May, and Battle of Bellewaarde Ridge, 24 May). The only action in 1916 was at the Battle of Flers-Courcelette (15 September) when it was in reserve to XIV Corps of Fourth Army. In 1917, it supported the division in a number of major actions including the Battle of Arras (April, First Battle of the Scarpe) and the Battle of Cambrai (November and December, including the Tank Attack, the Capture of Bourlon Wood and the German Counter-attacks). At other times, the battery served in the trenches as infantry.

1918 saw greater action as the war of movement resumed, including the German Operation Michael (March, the Battle of St. Quentin, the First Battle of Bapaume and the Battle of Rosières), the Advance to Victory (August, Battle of Amiens), the Second Battle of the Somme (August, Battle of Albert) and the battles of the Hindenburg Line (October, Battle of Cambrai and the Pursuit to the Selle).

At the Armistice, it was still serving with 1st Cavalry Brigade, 1st Cavalry Division.

=== Inter-war period ===
Still with the 1st Cavalry Division, it took part in the advance of the Second Army into Germany. E Subsection (Note: A Subsection consisted of a single gun and limber drawn by six horses (with three drivers), eight gunners (riding on the limber or mounted on their own horses), and an ammunition wagon also drawn by six horses (with three drivers). Two Subsections formed a Section and in a six gun battery these would be designated as Left, Centre and Right Sections.) was the first British gun to enter Germany, crossing the frontier at Poteau (between St. Vith and Malmedy and now in the Belgian province of Liège) at 9am on 1 December 1918. It crossed the Rhine by 13 December.

It transferred from Germany to IV Brigade, RHA at Newbridge and Kilkenny in May 1919. IV Brigade survived the immediate post-war reductions in the strength of the RHA, but was dissolved in October 1921 and the batteries became independent: I Battery was posted to India.

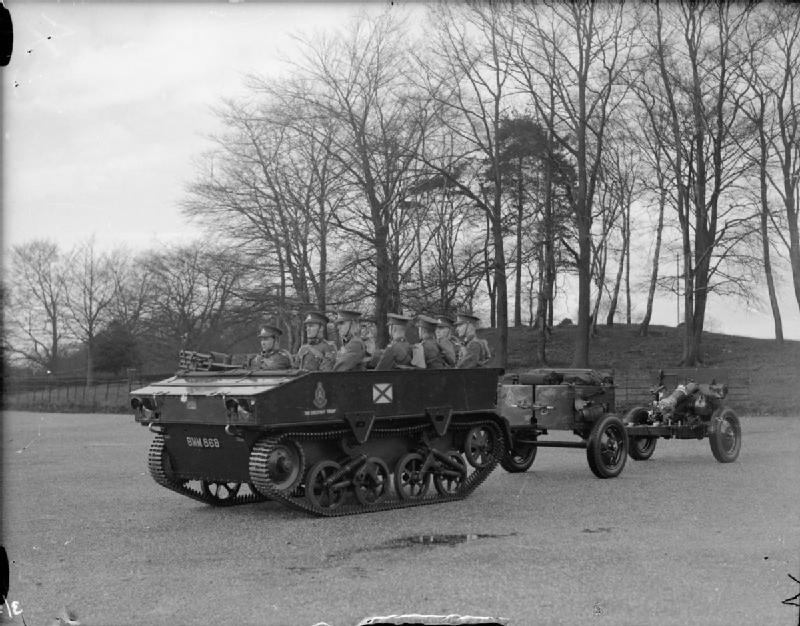
Vickers Light Dragon Mark II tractor towing a 3.7 inch howitzer on Carriage Mk IV and limber.

Throughout the 1920s and 1930s, the battery served as a separate unit, rotating through the five remaining battery stations of the RHA at Meerut, Risalpur, Sialkot, and Trimulgherry in India and St John's Wood Barracks in London. Mechanisation of the RHA began in 1934 and by 1936 the battery – now at Risalpur – had been given a mix of equipment: two sections had 18 pounders and one had 3.7" Howitzers towed by Light Dragon gun tractors.

In October 1936, the battery returned to the United Kingdom where it joined II Brigade, RHA at Newport. In 1938, field artillery brigades were reorganized from three six-gun batteries to two 12-gun batteries. Rather than disband existing batteries, they were instead linked in pairs. As a result, on 11 May, H Battery (from 8th Field Brigade) and I Battery were linked as H/I Battery, RHA. (Note: After linking RHA batteries in pairs, just C Battery with 4th Regiment, Royal Horse Artillery in Egypt and K Battery at St John's Wood Barracks remained unlinked.) With effect from May 1938, brigades were redesignated as regiments and II Brigade became 2nd Regiment, RHA on 21 May. By August 1939, the battery had been fully mechanized and equipped with 18/25 pounders. (Note: 18/25 pounders were 25 pounder guns mounted on late model 18 pounder carriages.)

=== Second World War ===
At the outbreak of the Second World War, the battery was still linked with H Battery as H/I Battery in 2nd Regiment, RHA. It remained with the 2nd RHA throughout the war.

Initially part of the 1st Armoured Division in the United Kingdom, in October 1939 it moved to France, where the regiment was placed under direct command of General Headquarters, BEF. It was still serving with the BEF when the Battle of France broke out in May 1940. After evacuation from the continent, it joined the 2nd Armoured Division and was transferred to Egypt with the division in November and December 1940. From January to May 1941 it took part in the Battle of Greece with the 1st Armoured Brigade.

The experience of the BEF in 1940 showed the limitations of having artillery regiments formed with two 12-gun batteries: field regiments were intended to support an infantry brigade of three battalions (or armoured brigade of three regiments). This could not be managed without severe disruption to the regiment. As a result, field regiments were reorganised into three 8-gun batteries. Surprisingly, it was not until April 1942 that H/I was unlinked. At this point the battery was armed with eight 25 pounders.

From 21 April 1942, it served with 22nd Guards Brigade under command of 2nd South African Division in the Battle of Gazala. On 25 June, it transferred to 22nd Armoured Brigade and took part in the Battle of Mersa Matruh and the Defence of the El Alamein Line.

On 24 August 1942, it rejoined the 1st Armoured Division. It served with this division throughout the rest of the Western Desert Campaign and the Tunisia Campaign, in particular, the battles of El Alamein, Tebaga Gap, Akarit, El Kourzia and Tunis. It moved with the division to Italy in May 1944, fighting at the Battle of Coriano on the Gothic Line. The regiment left 1st Armoured Division on 26 September 1944 and came under direct command of Headquarters, Allied Armies in Italy where it remained until the end of the war.

=== Post-war ===
Post-war, the battery remained part of the 2nd RHA, equipped with Sexton 25 pounder self-propelled guns. Initially stationed in Palestine, by 1950 it was at Hildesheim in Germany as part of the BAOR. In February 1958, 2nd RHA reverted to the Royal Artillery as 2nd Field Regiment, RA and the battery was transferred to 4th RHA in exchange for N Battery. It was now equipped with Cardinal 155 mm self-propelled guns and stationed at Hohne.

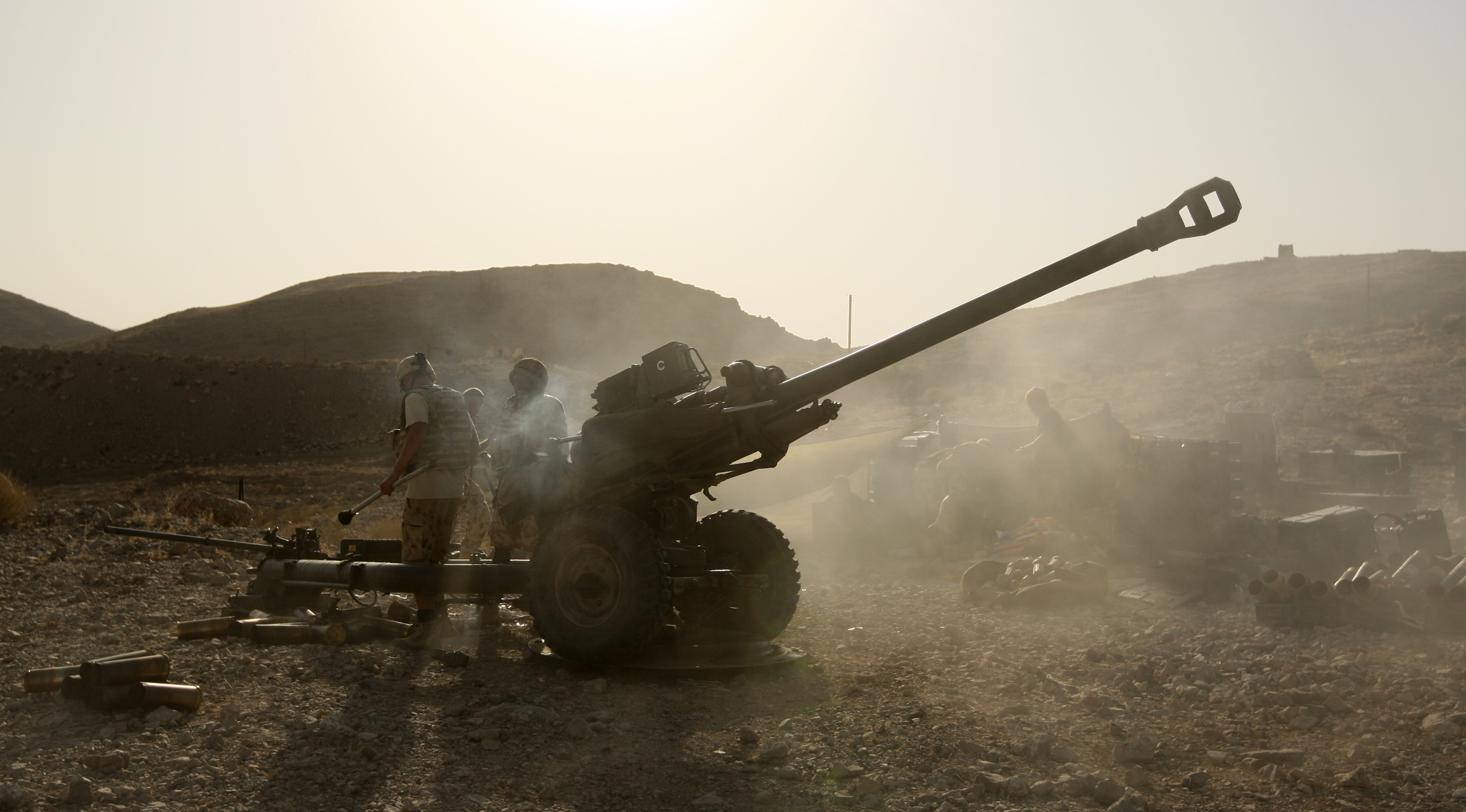
ISAF soldiers with 7th Parachute Regiment Royal Horse Artillery fire their 105 mm Light Gun at Taliban positions. Kajaki, Afghanistan, 28 August 2008

In 1961, it was decided to convert 33rd Parachute Light Regiment RA into a RHA regiment. As a result, 4th RHA reverted to the Royal Artillery as 4th Regiment Royal Artillery and its three batteries – F, G and I – were transferred to 7th Parachute Regiment Royal Horse Artillery on 27 June 1961. Initially equipped with the 105 mm Pack Howitzer, in 1974 the battery (and regiment) was re-armed with the L118 light gun.

Other than a period from 1977 to 1984 when the battery (and the regiment) was rerolled as a field artillery unit and posted to the BAOR in Germany, it has been based in England, initially at Aldershot but latterly at Colchester.

Since 1961, it has been posted to Kuwait in 1961, Aden in 1964, a number of roulement tours to Northern Ireland (Operation Banner) in the infantry role, Belize in 1992, Cyprus as part of UNFICYP (June to December 1994), Macedonia and Kosovo (Operation Agricola) in June 1999, Sierra Leone (Operation Silkman) in May 2000, Afghanistan (Operation Jacana) in 2001 and 2002, the Gulf War (Operation Telic) from March 2003, and Afghanistan again (Operation Herrick) in 2008.

=== Current status ===
Under Army 2020 plans, 7 PARA RHA was reduced from five to three batteries; V Battery was placed in suspended animation (Note: "Suspended animation" means that the unit continues to exist but without any personnel or equipment assigned.) in May 2013 and the headquarters battery – H Battery – was transferred to 1st RHA in August of the same year. As a consequence, I Battery was redesignated as the headquarters battery of the regiment as I Parachute HQ Battery (Bull's Troop). It provides command and control for the regiment.

== See also ==
- British Army
- Royal Artillery
- Royal Horse Artillery
- List of Royal Artillery Batteries

== Bibliography ==
- Becke, Archibald F. (1935). Order of Battle of Divisions Part 1–The Regular British Divisions. London: HMSO. OCLC 4405016.
- Bellis, Malcolm A. (1995). Regiments of the British Army 1939–1945 (Artillery). London: Military Press International. ISBN 0-85420-110-6.
- Clarke, W.G. (1993). Horse Gunners: The Royal Horse Artillery, 200 Years of Panache and Professionalism. Woolwich: The Royal Artillery Institution. ISBN 09520762-0-9.
- Forty, George (1998). British Army Handbook 1939–1945. Stroud, Gloucestershire: Sutton Publishing Limited. ISBN 0-7509-1403-3.
- Frederick, J.B.M. (1984). Lineage Book of British Land Forces 1660–1978. Wakefield, Yorkshire: Microform Academic Publishers. ISBN 1-85117-009-X.
- Joslen, Lt-Col H.F. (1990) [1960]. Orders of Battle, Second World War, 1939–1945. London: London Stamp Exchange. ISBN 0-948130-03-2.
- Lomas, David (1997). Mons 1914: The BEF's Tactical Triumph. Vol. 49 of Campaign Series. Oxford: Osprey. ISBN 1-85532-551-9.
- Order of Battle of the British Armies in France, November 11th, 1918. France: General Staff, GHQ. 1918.
