= H Battery (Ramsay's Troop) Royal Horse Artillery =

British Army artillery battery

H Parachute Headquarters Battery (Ramsay's Troop) Royal Horse Artillery
- Active: 1 June 1804 – 31 January 1819; 1 December 1857 – 2019
- Country: United Kingdom
- Branch: British Army
- Type: Artillery
- Role: 16 AABCT
- Size: Battery
- Part of: 7th Parachute Regiment Royal Horse Artillery
- Garrison/HQ: Merville Barracks, Colchester, England
- Nickname: Ramsay’s Troop
- Anniversaries: Waterloo Day 18 June
- Equipment: HQ Battery
- Engagements: Napoleonic Wars; First World War; Second World War; Operation Telic; Operation Herrick
- Battle honours: Ubique

H Parachute Headquarters Battery (Ramsay's Troop) Royal Horse Artillery is a battery of 7th Parachute Regiment Royal Horse Artillery, part of the Royal Horse Artillery of the British Army. As of 2023, it is based at Merville Barracks, Colchester, England and is the Headquarters Battery for the Unit.

Formed in 1804, the battery has taken part in the Napoleonic Wars (notably the Battle of Waterloo where it earned its Honour Title as Ramsay's Troop), and the First and Second World Wars.

Since the Second World War, it has seen a wide variety of service as towed and self-propelled artillery, a training and a headquarters unit, and latterly as a precision fire battery. It has been based in Germany as part of the BAOR, Malaysia, Northern Ireland (Operation Banner), the Balkans, Afghanistan and Iraq.

== History ==
=== Napoleonic Wars ===
The battery was formed on 1 June 1804 as H Troop, Horse Artillery at Woolwich as a horse artillery battery of the British Army. It remained at home for most of the Napoleonic Wars, but did take part in the Walcheren Expedition in 1809.

Armed with five 9 pounder guns and a single 5½" howitzer, (Note: Other sources state that it was armed with five 6 pounder guns and a single 5½" howitzer.) it took part in the Hundred Days Campaign in 1815 under the command of Captain (brevet Major) Norman Ramsay. During the Battle of Waterloo it was ordered to support the garrison at Hougoumont. By the end of the day, it had lost four of five officers, including Ramsay. It then took part in the advance to Paris and joined the Army of Occupation.

In commemoration of its performance at the Battle of Waterloo, the Honour Title "Ramsay's Troop" was officially granted to the battery on 13 October 1926.

In the usual post-war reductions of the British Army, a number of troops of horse artillery were disbanded between 1815 and 1816, including D Troop (Beane's Troop) on 31 July 1816. The remaining troops were then moved up to assume the next available letter and the H Troop became G Troop on the same date. It, too, was disbanded on 31 January 1819.

=== Victorian era ===
In the wake of the Crimean War and amidst the Indian Rebellion of 1857, the battery was re-raised on 1 December 1857 as G Battery. On 1 July 185, it was at Portobello Barracks, Dublin when it was assigned to the Horse Brigade, Royal Artillery along with all the existing horse artillery batteries of the Royal Artillery. This was an administrative, rather than tactical, formation.

As a result of the Rebellion, the British Crown took direct control of India from the East India Company on 1 November 1858 under the provisions of the Government of India Act 1858. The Presidency armies transferred to the direct authority of the British Crown and its European units were transferred to the British Army. Henceforth artillery, the mutineers most effective arm, was to be the sole preserve of the British Army (with the exception of certain Mountain Artillery batteries). On 19 February 1862, the Horse Brigade RA became the 1st Horse Brigade RA and the Bengal, Madras and Bombay horse artillery formed the 2nd to 5th Horse Brigades. (Note: The 1st Brigade Bengal Horse Artillery became 2nd Horse Brigade RA, the Madras Horse Artillery became 3rd Horse Brigade RA, the Bombay Horse Artillery became 4th Horse Brigade RA and the 2nd Brigade Bengal Horse Artillery became 5th Horse Brigade RA. The 3rd Brigade Bengal Horse Artillery was split between 2nd and 5th Horse Brigades RA.)

The 1st Brigade with 10 batteries was much larger than the other four (with four to seven batteries each). Therefore, a reorganization of the Horse Artillery on 13 April 1864 saw 1st Brigade split as A and B Brigades. (Note: At the same time, 2nd Brigade become C Brigade, 3rd become D Brigade, 4th become E Brigade, and 5th become F Brigade.) The battery was moved to A Brigade, and as battery designations were tied to the brigade the battery was assigned to, it was redesignated as D Battery, A Brigade (or D/A Battery in short). The battery was at Woolwich at this time.

From 1866, the term "Royal Horse Artillery" appeared in Army List hence the battery was designated D Battery, A Brigade, Royal Horse Artillery from about this time. Another reorganization, on 14 April 1877, saw the number of brigades reduced to three (of 10 batteries each); the battery – at Woolwich – remained in A Brigade but dropped in seniority and became H Battery, A Brigade. The number of brigades was further reduced to two (of 13 batteries each) in 1882 without effecting the designation of the battery by which time it was at Exeter.

The brigade system was finally abolished on 1 July 1889. Henceforth, batteries were designated in a single alphabetical sequence in order of seniority from date of formation and the battery took on its final designation as H Battery, Royal Horse Artillery.

The battery did not take part in the Second Boer War. (Note: Of the 10 RHA batteries that took part in the Second Boer War: A, J and M Batteries were unbrigaded; Q, T and U Batteries were assigned to 1st Cavalry Brigade; G and P Batteries were assigned to 2nd Cavalry Brigade; O and R Batteries were assigned to 3rd Cavalry Brigade)

=== First World War ===
The brigade system was reintroduced on 1 March 1901, this time as tactical formations, and the battery was assigned to the VII Brigade-Division, RHA (redesignated as VI Brigade, RHA on 1 October 1906) along with K Battery. In 1903, it was stationed at Meerut.

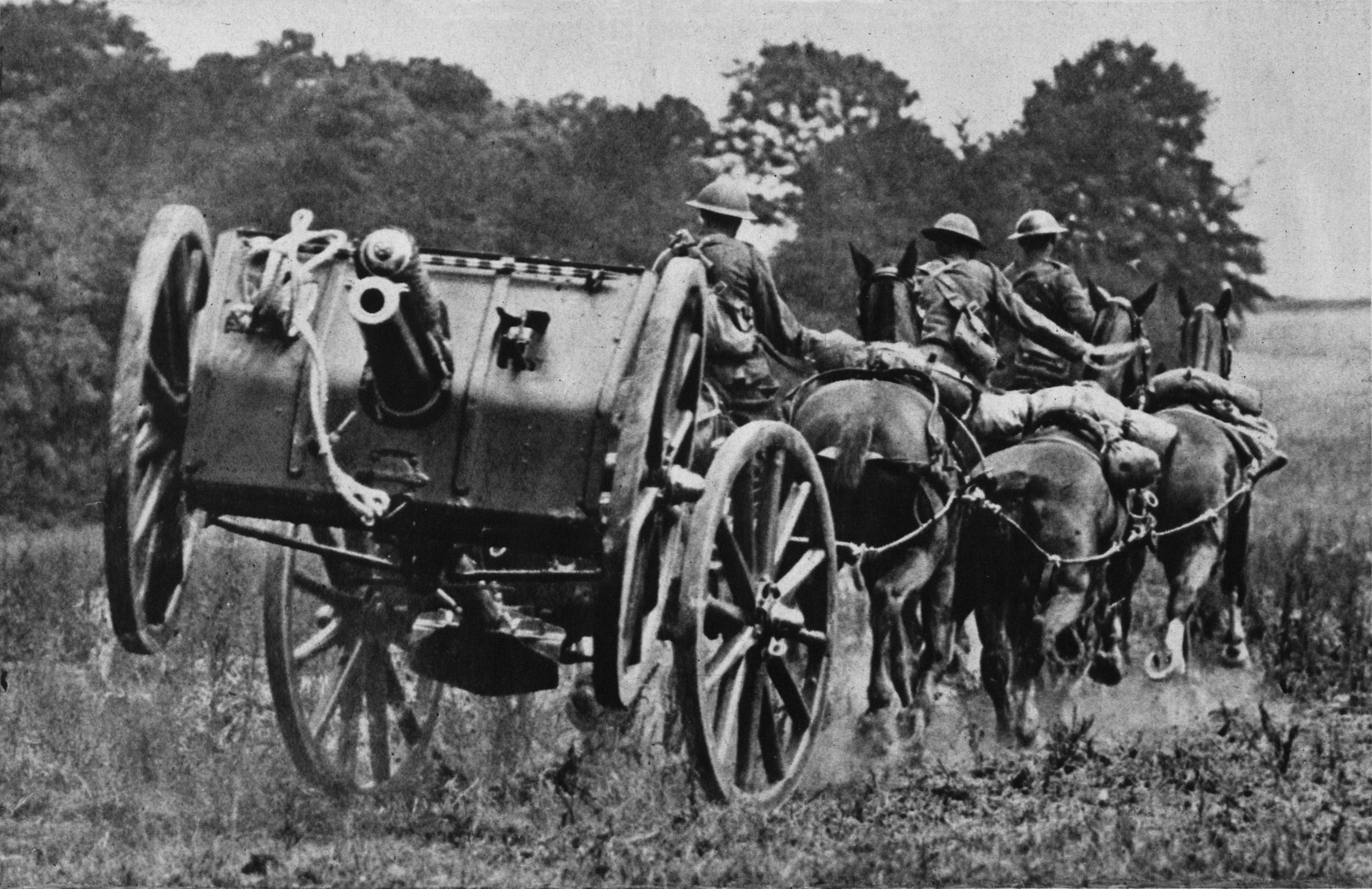
Photo showing 13 pounder gun team galloping into action.

By the time the First World War broke out, the battery had been re-equipped with six quick-firing 13 pounders and was stationed at Trowbridge, still assigned to VI Brigade with K Battery and attached to the 2nd Cavalry Brigade. Initially, it remained in the United Kingdom on mobilisation while the 2nd Cavalry Brigade joined The Cavalry Division and departed for France. However, on 28 September it was assigned to VII Brigade, RHA in 1st Cavalry Division as a permanent replacement for L Battery which had been almost destroyed at Néry. (Note: During the action at Néry on 1 September, L Battery was almost destroyed as an operational unit: of five Officers, three were killed and two wounded; of 200 Other Ranks, 20 were killed and 29 wounded; and five of six 13 pounders were lost. It had to be withdrawn to England to reform.)

It remained with the 1st Cavalry Division and served with it on the Western Front for the rest of the war. In practice, the batteries were permanently assigned to the cavalry brigades from September 1914 onwards and the battery was attached to 2nd Cavalry Brigade. It missed the earlier actions of 1914, but took part in the Race to the Sea, notably the Battle of Messines.

In 1915, it took part in the Second Battle of Ypres (Battle of Frezenberg, 9–13 May, and Battle of Bellewaarde Ridge, 24 May). The only action in 1916 was at the Battle of Flers-Courcelette (15 September) when it was in reserve to XIV Corps of Fourth Army. In 1917, it supported the division in a number of major actions including the Battle of Arras (April, First Battle of the Scarpe) and the Battle of Cambrai (November and December, including the Tank Attack, the Capture of Bourlon Wood and the German Counter-attacks). At other times, the battery served in the trenches as infantry.

1918 saw greater action as the war of movement resumed, including the German Operation Michael (March, the Battle of St. Quentin, the First Battle of Bapaume and the Battle of Rosières), the Advance to Victory (August, Battle of Amiens), the Second Battle of the Somme (August, Battle of Albert) and the battles of the Hindenburg Line (October, Battle of Cambrai and the Pursuit to the Selle).

At the Armistice, it was still serving with 2nd Cavalry Brigade, 1st Cavalry Division.

=== Inter-war period ===
Still with the 1st Cavalry Division, it took part in the advance of the Second Army into Germany, crossing the border on 1 December and the Rhine by 13 December. The battery transferred from Germany to II Brigade, RHA at Bordon in early 1919.

Between December 1919 and March 1920, it moved to India with II Brigade and was stationed at Sialkot. On 1 May 1924, the battery reverted to Royal Artillery status as H Battery, RA in 8th Field Brigade, RA. It was replaced in II Brigade by L Battery.

In 1938, field artillery brigades were reorganized from three six-gun batteries to two 12-gun batteries. Rather than disband existing batteries, they were instead linked in pairs. As a result, on 11 May, H Battery rejoined II Brigade, RHA – from 8th Field Brigade, RA – and simultaneously linked with I Battery as H/I Battery, RHA. (Note: After linking RHA batteries in pairs, just C Battery with 4th Regiment, Royal Horse Artillery in Egypt and K Battery at St John's Wood Barracks remained unlinked.) With effect from May 1938, brigades were redesignated as regiments and II Brigade became 2nd Regiment, RHA on 21 May. By August 1939 the battery had been fully mechanized and equipped with 18/25 pounders. (Note: 18/25 pounders were 25 pounder guns mounted on late model 18 pounder carriages.)

=== Second World War ===
At the outbreak of the Second World War, the battery was still linked with I Battery as H/I Battery in 2nd Regiment, RHA. It remained with the 2nd RHA throughout the war.

Initially part of the 1st Armoured Division in the United Kingdom, in October 1939 it moved to France, where the regiment was placed under direct command of General Headquarters, BEF. It was still serving with the BEF when the Battle of France broke out in May 1940. After evacuation from the continent, it joined the 2nd Armoured Division and was transferred to Egypt with the division in November and December 1940. From January to May 1941 it took part in the Battle of Greece with the 1st Armoured Brigade.

The experience of the BEF in 1940 showed the limitations of having artillery regiments formed with two 12-gun batteries: field regiments were intended to support an infantry brigade of three battalions (or armoured brigade of three regiments). This could not be managed without severe disruption to the regiment. As a result, field regiments were reorganised into three 8-gun batteries. Surprisingly, it was not until April 1942 that H/I was unlinked. At this point the battery was armed with eight 25 pounders.

From 21 April 1942, it served with 22nd Guards Brigade under command of 2nd South African Division in the Battle of Gazala. On 25 June, it transferred to 22nd Armoured Brigade and took part in the Battle of Mersa Matruh and the Defence of the El Alamein Line.

On 24 August 1942 it rejoined the 1st Armoured Division. It served with this division throughout the rest of the Western Desert Campaign and the Tunisia Campaign, in particular, the battles of El Alamein, Tebaga Gap, Akarit, El Kourzia and Tunis. It moved with the division to Italy in May 1944, fighting at the Battle of Coriano on the Gothic Line. The regiment left 1st Armoured Division on 26 September 1944 and came under direct command of Headquarters, Allied Armies in Italy where it remained until the end of the war.

=== Post-war ===
Post-war, the battery remained part of the 2nd RHA, equipped with Sexton 25 pounder self-propelled guns. Initially stationed in Palestine, by 1950 it was at Hildesheim in Germany as part of the BAOR.

On 3 December 1951, it once again reverted to the Royal Artillery as H Battery, RA and joined 6th Field Regiment in exchange for O Battery in the Suez Canal Zone. Still equipped with Sextons, it returned to Germany in 1954 (Hohne, then Munsterlager) until August 1962 when the regiment returned to England, where it was stationed at Larkhill as part of the Royal School of Artillery. In January 1966, it moved with the regiment to Terendak Camp, Malacca, Malaysia. The battery was now armed with 105mm Pack Howitzers. On 10 May 1968, 6th Regiment was placed in suspended animation (Note: "Suspended animation" means that the unit continues to exist but without any personnel or equipment assigned.) and H Battery moved to 39th Regiment Royal Artillery.

H Battery joined 39th Regiment, RA on 1 May 1968 at Sennelager and was equipped with towed 8" M115 howitzers. From November 1972 it was equipped with self-propelled 8" M110 howitzers (M110A1 variants from 1979). It undertook four roulement tours to Northern Ireland (Operation Banner) in the infantry role (25 October 1973 – 27 February 1974, 4 December 1975 – 6 April 1976, 12 January – 11 May 1978, and 24 November 1980 – 11 April 1981). The battery was placed in suspended animation in April 1982.

The battery was reformed in January 1994 and joined 7th Parachute Regiment Royal Horse Artillery at Aldershot as the headquarters battery. It subsequently saw postings in Cyprus as part of UNFICYP (June to December 1994), Macedonia and Kosovo (Operation Agricola) in June 1999, Northern Ireland in 1999 – 2000, Sierra Leone (Operation Silkman) in May 2000, Afghanistan (Operation Jacana) in 2001 – 2002, the Gulf War (Operation Telic) from March 2003, and Afghanistan again (Operation Herrick) in 2008.

Under Army 2020 plans, 7th Parachute Regiment RHA was reduced from five to three batteries; V Battery was placed in suspended animation in May 2013 and H Battery was transferred to 1st RHA in August of the same year.

Current Status

As part of the Future Soldier Programme, the battery will be reformed in 2023 as H Parachute Headquarters Battery (Ramsay's Troop) to act as the headquarters battery for 7th Parachute Regiment, RHA.

Ramsay’s Troop provides the Fire Direction Centre (FDC), Planning, and Execute functions for the Recce Strike Group within 16 Air Assault Brigade Combat Team (16 AABCT). Acting as the critical link between sensors and shooters, the Battery processes, coordinates, and disseminates targeting data to deliver timely and effective fires in support of manoeuvre operations. Beyond its operational role, Ramsay’s Troop is central to the Battery’s future capability development, driving the evolution of sensor-to-shooter integration, accelerating targeting cycles, and enhancing the delivery of precision effects across the battlespace.

== See also ==
- British Army
- Royal Artillery
- Royal Horse Artillery
- List of Royal Artillery Batteries

== Bibliography ==
- Becke, Archibald F. (1935). Order of Battle of Divisions Part 1–The Regular British Divisions. London: HMSO. OCLC 4405016.
- Bellis, Malcolm A. (1995). Regiments of the British Army 1939–1945 (Artillery). London: Military Press International. ISBN 0-85420-110-6.
- Clarke, W.G. (1993). Horse Gunners: The Royal Horse Artillery, 200 Years of Panache and Professionalism. Woolwich: The Royal Artillery Institution. ISBN 09520762-0-9.
- Forty, George (1998). British Army Handbook 1939–1945. Stroud, Gloucestershire: Sutton Publishing Limited. ISBN 0-7509-1403-3.
- Frederick, J.B.M. (1984). Lineage Book of British Land Forces 1660–1978. Wakefield, Yorkshire: Microform Academic Publishers. ISBN 1-85117-009-X.
- Joslen, Lt-Col H.F. (1990) [1960]. Orders of Battle, Second World War, 1939–1945. London: London Stamp Exchange. ISBN 0-948130-03-2.
- Lloyd, Ernest Marsh (1896). "Ramsay, William Norman". In Lee, Sidney (ed.). Dictionary of National Biography. Vol. 47. London: Smith, Elder & Co.
- Lomas, David (1997). Mons 1914: The BEF's Tactical Triumph. Vol. 49 of Campaign Series. Oxford: Osprey. ISBN 1-85532-551-9.
- Order of Battle of the British Armies in France, November 11th, 1918. France: General Staff, GHQ. 1918.
