= IX Brigade, Royal Horse Artillery =

Former horse artillery brigade of the British Army

IX Brigade, RHA
- Active: 1 March 1901 – February 1915; October 1919 – 4 May 1920
- Country: United Kingdom
- Branch: British Army
- Type: Artillery
- Size: Battalion

IX Brigade, Royal Horse Artillery was a brigade (Note: The basic organic unit of the Royal Artillery was, and is, the Battery. When grouped together they formed brigades, in the same way that infantry battalions or cavalry regiments were grouped together in brigades. At the outbreak of World War I, a field artillery brigade of headquarters (4 officers, 37 other ranks), three batteries (5 and 193 each), and a brigade ammunition column (4 and 154) had a total strength just under 800 so was broadly comparable to an infantry battalion (just over 1,000) or a cavalry regiment (about 550). Like an infantry battalion, an artillery brigade was usually commanded by a Lieutenant-Colonel. Artillery brigades were redesignated as regiments in 1938.) of the Royal Horse Artillery which existed in the early part of the 20th century. It was dissolved at the outbreak of World War I as its constituent batteries were posted to other formations. It was briefly resurrected post-war before being dissolved once again.

== History ==
=== First formation ===
Royal Horse Artillery brigades did not exist as an organizational or operational grouping of batteries until 1 July 1859 when the Horse Brigade, Royal Artillery was formed. The brigade system was extended to five (later six) brigades when the horse artillery of the Honourable East India Company had been transferred to the British Army in 1861. These brigades were reduced to five in 1871, then to three (of 10 batteries each) in 1877 and to two (of 13 batteries each) in 1882. The brigade system was finally abolished in 1889.

As battery designations were tied to the brigade that the battery was assigned to, batteries were redesignated in a bewildering sequence as they were transferred between brigades. For example, E Battery of C Brigade (E/C Bty) might become N Battery of A Brigade (N/A Bty) upon transfer. Henceforth, batteries were designated in a single alphabetical sequence in order of seniority from date of formation.

The brigade system was revived in 1901. Each brigade now commanded just two batteries and a small staff (a Lieutenant-Colonel in command, an adjutant and a brigade sergeant major). Initially, batteries were not assigned to brigades in any particular order, but in 1906, at the insistence of Edward VII, brigades were redesignated so that batteries were roughly in order of seniority (hence I Brigade commanded A Battery and B Battery).

IX Brigade, RHA was formed on 1 March 1901 as I Brigade-Division, RHA with N Battery and S Battery. In 1903 it was redesignated as I Brigade, RHA and was stationed at Aldershot. On 1 October 1906, it was redesignated as IX Brigade, RHA.

By the time World War I broke out, the brigade was in Secunderabad, India assigned to 9th (Secunderabad) Division. N Battery was at Secunderabad and on mobilization was assigned to the newly formed II Indian Brigade, RHA with 2nd Indian Cavalry Division (attached to 9th (Secunderabad) Cavalry Brigade) and sailed for the Western Front in November 1914. S Battery was at Bangalore and remained with the 9th (Secunderabad) Division until February 1915 when it departed for Mesopotamia. There it joined the 6th Indian Cavalry Brigade on formation on 21 February. With the departure of its batteries, the brigade HQ was dissolved in February 1915.

=== Second formation ===
By October 1919, IX Brigade, RHA was reformed in the United Kingdom with

- N Battery, RHA from V Brigade, RHA and stationed at Trowbridge
- S Battery, RHA from Mesopotamia and stationed at Trowbridge
- U Battery, RHA from XVI Brigade, RHA and stationed at Trowbridge
- T Battery, RHA from XIV Brigade, RHA and stationed at Aldershot and Newbridge (Note: T Battery probably did not join the other batteries at Trowbridge as the brigade was broken up very soon after being organized. Frederick states that T Battery actually joined IV Brigade, RHA which was at Newbridge and Kilkenny with I and L Batteries.)

This new incarnation was short-lived, however. On 4 May 1920 the brigade was broken up. N Battery moved to St John's Wood and joined IV Brigade, RHA, S and U Batteries was redesignated as 144th and 143rd Batteries, RFA and joined 15th Brigade Royal Field Artillery and T Battery was redesignated as 146th Battery, RFA and joined 1st Brigade Royal Field Artillery.

== Bibliography ==
- Clarke, W.G. (1993). Horse Gunners: The Royal Horse Artillery, 200 Years of Panache and Professionalism. Woolwich: The Royal Artillery Institution. ISBN 09520762-0-9.
- Frederick, J.B.M. (1984). Lineage Book of British Land Forces 1660–1978. Wakefield, Yorkshire: Microform Academic Publishers. ISBN 1-85117-009-X.
- Perry, F.W. (1993). Order of Battle of Divisions Part 5B. Indian Army Divisions. Newport: Ray Westlake Military Books. ISBN 1-871167-23-X.
