= XIII Brigade, Royal Horse Artillery =

Former horse artillery brigade of the British Army

XIII Brigade, RHA
- Active: 1 March 1901 – 22 December 1914
- Country: United Kingdom
- Branch: British Army
- Type: Artillery
- Size: Battalion

XIII Brigade, Royal Horse Artillery was a brigade (Note: The basic organic unit of the Royal Artillery was, and is, the Battery. When grouped together they formed brigades, in the same way that infantry battalions or cavalry regiments were grouped together in brigades. At the outbreak of World War I, a field artillery brigade of headquarters (4 officers, 37 other ranks), three batteries (5 and 193 each), and a brigade ammunition column (4 and 154) had a total strength just under 800 so was broadly comparable to an infantry battalion (just over 1,000) or a cavalry regiment (about 550). Like an infantry battalion, an artillery brigade was usually commanded by a Lieutenant-Colonel. Artillery brigades were redesignated as regiments in 1938.) of the Royal Horse Artillery which existed in the early part of the 20th century. It was dissolved at the outbreak of World War I as its constituent batteries were posted to other formations.

== History ==
=== Background ===
Royal Horse Artillery brigades did not exist as an organizational or operational grouping of batteries until 1 July 1859 when the Horse Brigade, Royal Artillery was formed. The brigade system was extended to five (later six) brigades when the horse artillery of the Honourable East India Company had been transferred to the British Army in 1861. These brigades were reduced to five in 1871, then to three (of 10 batteries each) in 1877 and to two (of 13 batteries each) in 1882. The brigade system was finally abolished in 1889.

As battery designations were tied to the brigade that the battery was assigned to, batteries were redesignated in a bewildering sequence as they were transferred between brigades. For example, E Battery of C Brigade (E/C Bty) might become N Battery of A Brigade (N/A Bty) upon transfer. Henceforth, batteries were designated in a single alphabetical sequence in order of seniority from date of formation.

The brigade system was revived in 1901. Each brigade now commanded just two batteries and a small staff (a Lieutenant-Colonel in command, an adjutant and a brigade sergeant major). Initially, batteries were not assigned to brigades in any particular order, but in 1906, at the insistence of Edward VII, brigades were redesignated so that batteries were roughly in order of seniority (hence I Brigade commanded A Battery and B Battery).

=== Formation ===
XIII Brigade, RHA was formed on 1 March 1901 as the III Brigade-Division, RHA with X Battery and Y Battery. In 1903 it was redesignated as III Brigade, RHA and was stationed at St John's Wood (X Battery) and Aldershot (Y Battery). On 1 October 1906, it was redesignated as XIII Brigade, RHA.

By the time World War I broke out, the brigade was in Mhow, India assigned to 5th (Mhow) Division. On mobilization, X Battery was assigned to the newly formed II Indian Brigade, RHA with 2nd Indian Cavalry Division (attached to 5th (Mhow) Cavalry Brigade) and sailed for the Western Front in November 1914. Y Battery sailed for the United Kingdom in December 1914. In January 1915, it joined XV Brigade, RHA at Leamington and was assigned to 29th Division. With the departure of its batteries, the brigade HQ was dissolved on 22 December 1914.

== See also ==
- 13th Regiment, Royal Horse Artillery (Honourable Artillery Company) for a similarly numbered regiment in World War II.

== Bibliography ==
- Becke, Archibald F. (1935). Order of Battle of Divisions Part 1–The Regular British Divisions. London: HMSO. OCLC 4405016.
- Clarke, W.G. (1993). Horse Gunners: The Royal Horse Artillery, 200 Years of Panache and Professionalism. Woolwich: The Royal Artillery Institution. ISBN 09520762-0-9.
- Frederick, J.B.M. (1984). Lineage Book of British Land Forces 1660-1978. Wakefield, Yorkshire: Microform Academic Publishers. ISBN 1-85117-009-X.
- Perry, F.W. (1993). Order of Battle of Divisions Part 5B. Indian Army Divisions. Newport: Ray Westlake Military Books. ISBN 1-871167-23-X.
