= Erroll Tremlett =

English cricketer and British Army officer

Major-General Erroll Tremlett CB TD
- Portrait by Walter Stoneman, 1944
- Born: Erroll Arthur Edwin Tremlett; 22 December 1893; Brentford, Middlesex, England
- Died: 24 December 1982 (aged 89); Kenn, Devon, England
- Military career
- Allegiance: United Kingdom
- Branch: British Army
- Service years: 1914–1946
- Rank: Major-General
- Service number: 13234
- Unit: Royal Artillery
- Commands: 54th Light Anti-Aircraft Regiment; 10th Anti-Aircraft Division; 1st Anti-Aircraft Group; 9th Anti-Aircraft Group; 2nd Anti-Aircraft Group
- Conflicts: First World War; Second World War
- Awards: Companion of the Order of the Bath; Territorial Decoration
- Cricket career

Cricket information
- Batting: Right-handed
- Bowling: Right-arm medium

Domestic team information
- Years: Team
- 1929–1934: Marylebone Cricket Club

Career statistics
| Competition | First-class |
|---|---|
| Matches | 2 |
| Runs scored | 35 |
| Batting average | 8.75 |
| 100s/50s | 0/0 |
| Top score | 23 |
| Balls bowled | 60 |
| Wickets | 1 |
| Bowling average | 31.00 |
| 5 wickets in innings | 0 |
| 10 wickets in match | 0 |
| Best bowling | 1/1 |
| Catches/stumpings | 1/– |
- Source: CricInfo, 4 August 2025

Major-General Erroll Arthur Edwin Tremlett CB TD (22 December 1893 – 24 December 1982) was a British Army officer. Born into a military family, Tremlett overcame hardships to forge a successful military career in the Royal Artillery and Territorial Army. Educated at Christ's Hospital where he struggled academically, Tremlett emigrated to Canada shortly after completing his education, but this move was not a success. He returned home at the start of the First World War and was commissioned into the Royal Artillery. After serving in the war, Tremlett began a slow rise through the ranks. Believing the Munich Agreement would bring peace, he retired from regular service in the Royal Artillery and accepted a commission in the Territorial Army. With the onset of the Second World War, Tremlett fought in the Battle of France in 1940 and was evacuated from Dunkirk. As the war progressed, he held a number of anti-aircraft commands in Manchester, Yorkshire and the Humber, and London, where he commanded the capital's air defences from 1942 to 1944. He eventually retired from the Territorial Army as an honorary major-general. A keen sportsman, he also played first-class cricket for the Marylebone Cricket Club.

== Early life and WWI ==
Tremlett was born to Colonel Edmund John Tremlett and Mary Janet Augusta Simkins at Brentford in December 1893, with his father being aged 53 at the time of his birth. He was educated at Christ's Hospital, leaving at the age of 16 having performed poorly academically, which meant Tremlett could not join the British Army. After briefly working in a stockbrokers office, he emigrated to Canada with just £10 and settled in the town of Prince Albert, Saskatchewan. Recovering from dysentery shortly after his arrival, he gained employment with a local family ferrying a cable ferry across the Saskatchewan River. He later moved to the wilderness, where he began construction of a homestead, but lonelieness meant he never completed the build and moved to the city of Edmonton.

With the start of the First World War in Europe in July 1914, Tremlett decided to return to the United Kingdom where he volunteered for the Royal Artillery Special Reserve. He was commissioned as a second lieutenant in December 1914, and arrived on the Western Front in March 1915, where he joined an artillery unit in the 5th Infantry Division He saw action at the Battle of Hill 60, with the hill being captured by British troops in April 1915, before being recaptured by German troops the following month. He was granted a regular commission in the British Army in January 1916, antedated to September 1915. Tremlett was wounded in action in September 1916 during fighting around Ypres, returning to England to recuperate. After returning to the front, he was promoted to lieutenant in July 1917 and was made an adjutant of an artillery field brigade two and a half weeks later, which carried with it the acting rank of captain. He continued as an adjutant in France following the end of the war.

== Inter–war years ==
Following the war he was accepted onto the equitation course at the Army School of Equitation at Weedon in 1922, spending a year improving his riding skills, which was something to be expected of an officer. After completing the course, he was appointed to the riding establishment at Woolwich, where he instructed cadets. He left Woolwich in May 1923 and was appointed as an adjutant to the V Brigade, Royal Horse Artillery based at Aldershot Garrison. While based at Aldershot he was a member of the Officers Club. From Aldershot he was appointed to O Battery based at St John's Wood Barracks, where he took part in the Royal Tournament. Finding promotion to be slow during peacetime, which was exasperated by the economic conditions of the time, Tremlett was seconded to the 85th (East Anglian) Field Regiment (itself a part of the Territorial Army (TA)) in January 1927, being appointed an adjutant with the temporary rank of captain.

A keen sportsman who had previously played cricket for the Royal Artillery and polo for the army, Tremlett made the first of two first-class appearances for the Marylebone Cricket Club (MCC) in August 1929, against Wales at Lord's. He gained the rank of captain on a full time basis in July 1928, with Tremlett returning to regular regimental duties with the Royal Artillery following the end of his secondment with the TA in January 1931. In 1932, he was selected for the gunnery staff course at Woolwich, spending four and a half months at the Military College of Science, before studying at the Woolwich Arsenal and at the School of Anti-Aircraft and Coast Defence at Shoeburyness. From there Tremlett spent a year at the Royal School of Artillery on Salisbury Plain. He played his second first-class match for the MCC in 1934 against Ireland at Dublin. His two first-class matches returned Tremlett 35 runs and a single wicket.

Upon completing the course, he was appointed an instructor of Gunnery at Southern Command, a post he held until late 1936. In January 1937, he was promoted to major. In the same year he was posted to British India, where he served on the North-West Frontier Province. Around this time, being aged 43, he wrote to the War Office to enquire about this prospects of future promotions given he was approaching the 50 years age limit for the retirement of majors; he was informed by the War Office that he was unlikely to be considered for promotion until he was 49. With the signing of the Munich Agreement in September 1938, Tremlett became convinced that the agreement had achieved "peace for our time", therefore he resigned his commission in January 1939 and retired on the basis that war was unlikely. However, while he had retired from the regular army, he was persuaded to take a commission in the TA by the War Office at the rank of lieutenant colonel, which carried on in succession from his retirement. His immediate task involved raising the 21st Light Anti-Aircraft Regiment in North West England.

== WWII and later life ==
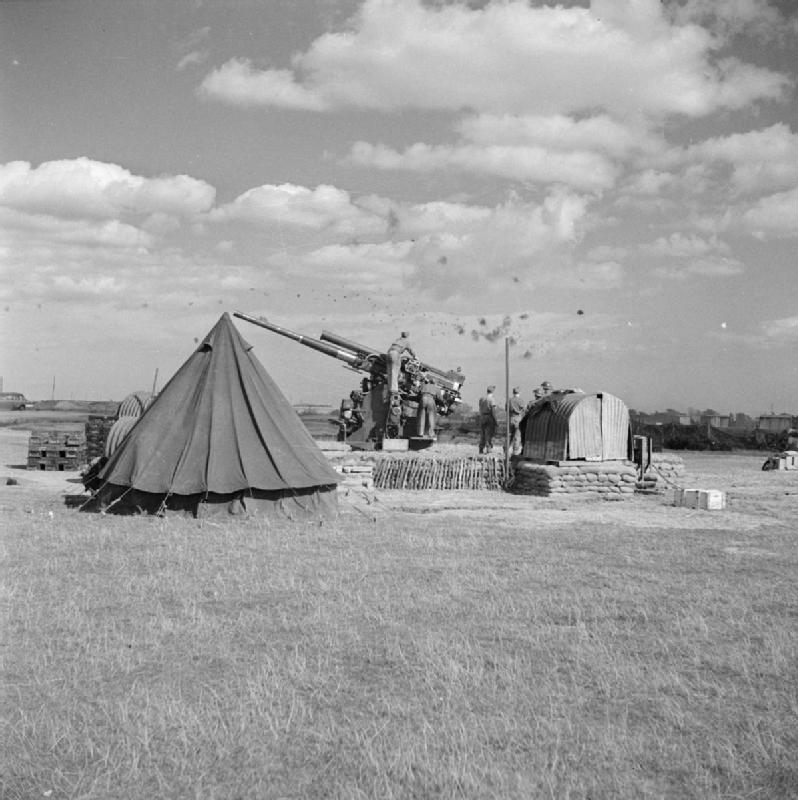
A 3.7-inch AA gun is in action near London in August 1944. Shell bursts can be seen in the sky above.

Ultimately the Munich Agreement failed following the Invasion of Poland and the start of the Second World War in September 1939, with tensions having been building for a number of months prior, with the TA mobilised in August. Expecting the Luftwaffe to bomb Britain in the event of war, with Tremlett ensuring his regiment was ready for war. A well regarded officer, he was chosen by Major-General Hugh Martin to be one of his regimental commanders in France with the British Expeditionary Force, where he commanded the 54th Light Anti-Aircraft Regiment as part of the Argyll and Sutherland Highlanders during the Battle of France. With France falling to the Germans, he was evacuated from Dunkirk and returned with his regiment to Manchester for rest and recuperation. For his efforts in France, Tremlett was mentioned in dispatches. When the position arose as the anti-aircraft brigade commander for Manchester, Tremlett was appointed and upon being appointed commanding officer of the 44th Anti-Aircraft Brigade in November 1940, he was made both an acting colonel and acting brigadier in May 1941. He commanded four regiments in Manchester and its surroundings, which were spread across a wide area.

His next appointment came in February 1942, when he replaced Major-General Langley Browning as general commanding officer of the 10th Anti-Aircraft Division, at which point he was promoted to acting major-general. Defending Yorkshire and the Humber, he commanded three anti-aircraft brigades consisting of 15 regiments, in addition to a division of troops from the Royal Corps of Signals. After a reorganisation of divisional headquarters, Tremlett was given command of the 1st Anti-Aircraft Group in October 1942, which held the responsibility of the anti-aircraft defence of London. Under his command were three anti-aircraft brigades. These were also responsible for defending locations outside of London, such as Windsor Castle and Chequers. He was made a war substantive colonel in February 1943, while still an acting brigadier and major-general. On one occasion a crane lifting an anti-aircraft gun into the back of Downing Street broke down, leaving the gun suspended above the street, and in the process disturbing a cabinet meeting. The Prime Minister Winston Churchill phoned Tremlett and instructed him to "take the damn thing away". His overall area of command was extended in June 1943 to cover the entire River Thames and the River Medway. To facilitate better relations between British and American troops, Tremlett was known to arrange baseball matches between the two.

He was appointed a Companion of the Order of the Bath in the 1944 New Year Honours. With the air threat evolving later in the war away from aircraft and toward the V-1 flying bomb, Tremlett met with General Frederick Pile and Major-General Robert Whittaker to discuss the threat. With allied forces forcing the Germans back on the continent, many anti-aircraft personnel were redeployed to support the advance, leaving air defences against the flying bombs depleted. The decision was made to create the 9th Anti-Aircraft Group, with Tremlett being given its command in November 1944, which consisted of seven brigades. Following the end of the war the 9th Anti-Aircraft Group was disbanded, with Tremlett being transferred to the 2nd Anti-Aircraft Group tasked with demobilisation and the transition of the Group to a peacetime footing. He retired from active service in July 1946, having exceeded the age limit for recall for regular forces. Tremlett was appointed honorary colonel of the 656th Light Anti-Aircraft Regiment in June 1947, while the following year he was decorated with the Territorial Decoration for nine years service in the TA. He exceeded the age for recall in the TA in December 1949 and ceased to belong to the Reserve of Officers; at this point he held the rank of honorary major-general.

In retirement he moved to Devon, where he continued to play cricket at club level, playing for the Devon Dumplings until he was 80. He was present at the Coronation of Elizabeth II in 1953 as a Gold Staff Officer and was president of the Devon Royal Artillery Association from 1957 to 1967. He died in Devon at Kenn in December 1982, two days after his 89th birthday. He was survived by his wife, Dorothy, with whom he had one daughter.

== Bibliography ==
- Smart, Nick (2005). Biographical Dictionary of British Generals of the Second World War. Barnesley: Pen & Sword. ISBN 1844150496.
