= V Battery Royal Horse Artillery =

Former British Army airborne artillery battery

V (Beane’s Troop) Battery Royal Horse Artillery
- Active: 1 November 1793 – 31 July 1816; 13 February 1900 – 10 May 1968; 2008 – May 2013; 2026 – Current
- Country: United Kingdom
- Branch: British Army
- Type: Artillery
- Size: Battery
- Engagements: Napoleonic Wars; First World War; Second World War; Indonesia–Malaysia confrontation Operation Herrick
- Battle honours: Ubique

V Battery Royal Horse Artillery is a battery of the Royal Horse Artillery. Formed in 1804, the battery took part in the Napoleonic Wars – notably the Peninsular War and Battle of Waterloo – before being placed into suspended animation in 1816 as part of the usual post-war reductions of the British Army.

Reformed in 1900, the battery saw active service on the Western Front and in Mesopotamia during the First World War. Reverting to the Royal Artillery as V Battery Royal Artillery, it served in North Africa and the Far East in the Second World War.

Since the Second World War, it has seen a wide variety of service as towed and self-propelled artillery, a training unit, an Aviation Tactical Group and latterly as a Forward Observation Battery. It has been based in Germany as part of the BAOR, Malaysia and Borneo (Indonesia–Malaysia confrontation) and Afghanistan (Operation Herrick). In May 2013 it was placed in suspended animation a second time however, it has been reactivated in September 2026 under 1st RHA. (Note: "Suspended animation" means that the unit continues to exist but without any personnel or equipment assigned.)

== History ==
=== Napoleonic Wars ===
The battery was formed on 1 November 1793 as D Troop, Horse Artillery at Woolwich with six 6 pounder guns as a horse artillery battery of the British Army. It remained at home for the French Revolutionary Wars and the early part of the Napoleonic Wars, but departed for the Iberian Peninsula in March 1810 under command of Captain George Lefebvre (hence known as Lefebvre's Troop).

Thereafter, it took part in a number of Wellington's major actions of the Peninsular War including the Battle of Bussaco in 1810 and the Siege of Almeida, the Battle of Albuera and the Battle of Usagre in 1811. Lefebvre died on 23 October 1812 and was succeeded by Captain George Beane (hence Beane's Troop). It then took part in the Battle of Vitoria and Battle of the Pyrenees in 1813 and the Battle of Orthez and Battle of Toulouse in 1814.

Armed with 9 pounder guns (Note: Other sources state that it was armed with five 9 pounder guns and a single 5½" howitzer or with five 6 pounder guns and a single 5½" howitzer.) it took part in the Hundred Days Campaign in 1815 under the command of Major Beane, notably the Battle of Waterloo. Beane was killed in action in the battle and Captain Mercer took command. It then took part in the advance to Paris. In the usual post-war reductions of the British Army, a number of troops of horse artillery were disbanded between 1815 and 1816, including D Troop on 31 July 1816.

=== First World War ===
The battery was reformed on 13 February 1900 as V Battery, Royal Horse Artillery, and located at the St John's Wood Barracks.

On 1 March 1901, a new brigade (Note: The basic organic unit of the Royal Artillery was, and is, the Battery. When grouped together they formed brigades, in the same way that infantry battalions or cavalry regiments were grouped together in brigades. At the outbreak of World War I, a field artillery brigade of headquarters (4 officers, 37 other ranks), three batteries (5 and 193 each), and a brigade ammunition column (4 and 154) had a total strength just under 800 so was broadly comparable to an infantry battalion (just over 1,000) or a cavalry regiment (about 550). Like an infantry battalion, an artillery brigade was usually commanded by a Lieutenant-Colonel. Artillery brigades were redesignated as regiments in 1938.) system was introduced and the battery was assigned to the II Brigade-Division, RHA (redesignated as XII Brigade, RHA on 1 October 1906) along with W Battery. In 1903 it was stationed at Woolwich.

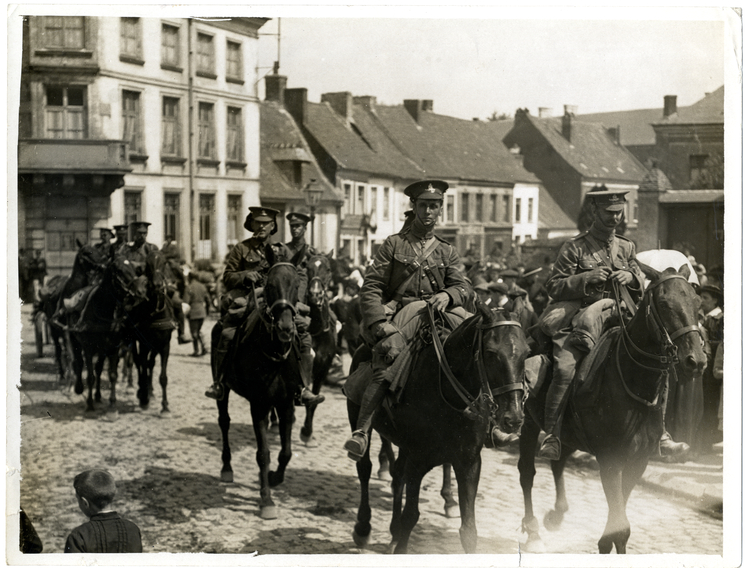
V Battery, Royal Horse Artillery, riding through Fenges, France

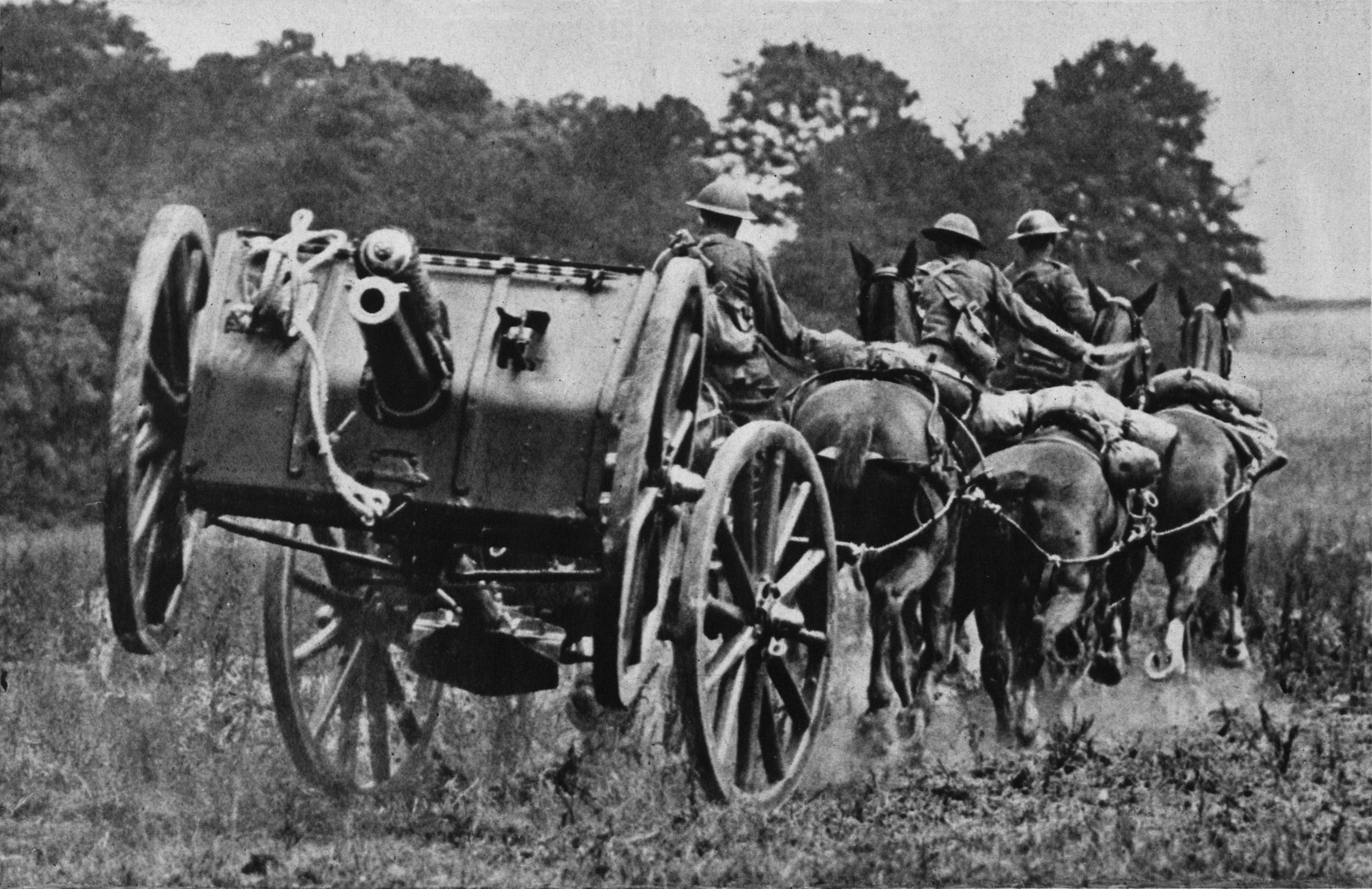
Photo showing 13 pounder gun team galloping into action

By the time the First World War broke out, the battery had been re-equipped with six quick-firing 13 pounders. It was still with W Battery in XII Brigade, and was stationed at Meerut, assigned to the 7th (Meerut) Division. On mobilization, V Battery was transferred to the newly formed II Indian Brigade, RHA, 2nd Indian Cavalry Division and sailed for the Western Front in November 1914. In practice, the artillery batteries were permanently assigned to the division's cavalry brigades and the battery was attached to 7th (Meerut) Cavalry Brigade.

2nd Indian Cavalry Division did not take part in any major actions in 1915 and the early part of 1916, but the battery served in the trenches as infantry at times. In June 1916, 7th (Meerut) Cavalry Brigade (complete with V Battery) left the division and was reformed for service in Mesopotamia.

The battery arrived in Mesopotamia in August 1916 and remained there with the 7th Indian Cavalry Brigade for the rest of the war. The brigade initially served as an independent formation, as part of the Cavalry Division from 8 December 1916 to 8 April 1918, and independent again thereafter.

From December 1916, it took part in the advance to Kut, culminating in the Second Battle of Kut (23 February 1917). It then took part in the Pursuit to Baghdad and a number of actions later in 1917. In 1918 it took part in the Affair of Kulawand (27 April), the action of Tuz Khurmatli (29 April), the action at Fat-ha Gorge on the Little Zab (23–26 October 1918) and the Battle of Sharqat (28–30 October 1918) under the command of I Corps.

After the Armistice of Mudros, the 7th Indian Cavalry Brigade was selected to form part of the occupation forces for Mesopotamia. The brigade was finally broken up in late 1920.

=== Inter-war period ===
Post-war plans for the RHA envisioned that it would have 27 batteries in nine brigades. In May 1919, the battery joined the newly reformed VI Brigade, RHA at Shorncliffe with W and X Batteries. This new organisation was short-lived, however, as the usual post-war reductions took their toll. On 8 January 1920, the brigade was absorbed into 8th Brigade, Royal Field Artillery and on 4 May 1920, V, W, and X Batteries were converted to 137th, 138th and 139th Batteries, RFA in 8th Brigade, RFA. On 1 November 1922 it was redesignated as 103rd Battery, RFA before resuming its original designation as V Battery, Royal Artillery on 1 May 1924.

With effect from May 1938, brigades were redesignated as regiments and 8th Brigade became 8th Field Regiment, RA on 11 May. V Battery was still with the regiment on the outbreak of the Second World War with W, X and AA Batteries. (Note: From 1 July 1889, RHA batteries were lettered in a single alphabetical sequence in order of seniority from date of formation. When more than 26 batteries were needed, double letters were used, AA, BB, etc.) It was stationed at Lucknow, India with 6th Indian Infantry Brigade equipped with 18/25 pounders. (Note: 18/25 pounders were 25 pounder guns mounted on late model 18 pounder carriages.)

=== Second World War ===
The battery served with 8th Field Regiment throughout the Second World War. On 25 August 1940 they left India, arrived in Egypt on 13 September and joined Headquarters Matruh Fortress (22nd Brigade).

From 1938, field artillery brigades had been reorganized from three or four six-gun batteries to two 12-gun batteries. Rather than disband existing batteries, they were instead linked in pairs. Strangely, this did not happen in 8th Field Regiment until 18 September 1940 (after arrival in Egypt) when V Battery was linked with AA Battery as V/AA Battery (and W and X batteries were linked as W/X Battery). The experience of the BEF in May 1940 had already shown the limitations of having artillery regiments formed with two 12-gun batteries: field regiments were intended to support an infantry brigade of three battalions (or armoured brigade of three regiments). This could not be managed without severe disruption to the regiment. As a result, field regiments were reorganised into three 8-gun batteries but this did not happen in 8th Field Regiment until November 1942.

By now re-equipped with 25 pounders, on 2 January 1942 it was assigned to 2nd Armoured Brigade, to 5th Indian Infantry Brigade, 4th Indian Infantry Division on 12 February and to 70th Infantry Division on 28 February. In reaction to the Japanese entry into the war, it immediately returned to India with 70th Infantry Division, departing Egypt on 6 March and arriving on 23 March. It was posted to the Ranchi area.

8th Regiment was reorganized as three batteries in November 1942. The sources differ as to the designation of the battery at this point. Clarke states that it remained as V/AA Battery until 31 December 1946 when V Battery absorbed AA Battery. Frederick is in accordance with this. Joslen and Barton state that it became V Battery in November 1942. A proposal to number the battery as 578th Field Battery in March 1943 was rescinded in April.

On 27 April 1943, it move to Calcutta and on 14 July to Bangalore. From 6 September 1943, 70th Division was reorganized for the role of Long Range Penetration (Chindits). 8th Field Regiment (and V Battery) left the division on 30 September 1943 and came under the command of Royal Artillery Southern Army. It was reorganized as a Jungle Field Regiment. (Note: Jungle Field Regiments were reorganized from Field Regiments by replacing some 25 pounders with 3-inch mortars.)

On 11 November 1943, it joined 25th Indian Infantry Division and with it moved to the Arakan on 21 March 1944. It remained in Burma with the 25th Division until 28 May 1945 when it departed Rangoon, arriving at Bangalore on 4 June. There, it joined 26th Indian Infantry Division until 20 July when it transferred to Poona and come under the command of 36th Infantry Division. It ended the war with 36th Division in India.

=== Post-war ===
Plans were put in place at the end of 1946 to create a total of eight RHA regiments to form the artillery element of the 6th and 7th Armoured Divisions in the British Army of the Rhine. 8th Regiment, RHA was to be a Light Anti-Aircraft (LAA) Regiment with V, W and X Batteries. V Battery became RHA on 31 December 1946. Initially formed in the BAOR in October 1946, the decision was rescinded in March 1947 before the regiment was fully constituted. On 1 April 1947, the regiment became 10th Field Regiment, Royal Artillery and the battery transferred to 4th Regiment, RHA at Dorset Barracks, Kiel equipped with 25 pounders. It moved to England (Blackdown Barracks) in July 1948 before returning to Germany (Hohne) in March 1951.

On 3 December 1951, it once again reverted to the Royal Artillery as V Battery, RA and joined 6th Field Regiment in exchange for O Battery in the Suez Canal Zone. Equipped with Sexton 25 pounder self-propelled guns, it returned to Germany in 1954 (Hohne again, then Munsterlager) until August 1962 when the regiment returned to England, where it was stationed at Larkhill as part of the Royal School of Artillery. In January 1966, it moved with the regiment to Terendak Camp, Malacca, Malaysia, where the battery saw a duty stint in Borneo in the same year. The battery was now armed with 105mm Pack Howitzers. On 10 May 1968, 6th Regiment was placed in suspended animation and V Battery with it.

The battery was reformed in 2008 and joined 7th Parachute Regiment Royal Horse Artillery at Colchester as an Aviation Tactical Group. It played a key role in the integration of the Apache attack helicopters into British Army operations. It deployed with 7 Para RHA as part of 16 Air Assault Brigade to Helmand Province, Afghanistan as part of Operation Herrick from October 2010 to April 2011.

Under Army 2020 plans, 7 Para RHA was reduced from five to three batteries; H Battery was transferred to 1st RHA in August 2013 and V Battery was, once again, placed in suspended animation in May of the same year.

As of 2026 V Battery has once again been reactivated under 1st RHA as one of two TAC Batteries supporting the Household Cavalry Battlegroup mounted on the AJAX reconnaissance vehicle.

== See also ==
- British Army
- Royal Artillery
- Royal Horse Artillery
- List of Royal Artillery Batteries

== Bibliography ==
- Bellis, Malcolm A. (1995). Regiments of the British Army 1939–1945 (Artillery). London: Military Press International. ISBN 0-85420-110-6.
- Clarke, W.G. (1993). Horse Gunners: The Royal Horse Artillery, 200 Years of Panache and Professionalism. Woolwich: The Royal Artillery Institution. ISBN 09520762-0-9.
- Forty, George (1998). British Army Handbook 1939–1945. Stroud, Gloucestershire: Sutton Publishing Limited. ISBN 0-7509-1403-3.
- Frederick, J.B.M. (1984). Lineage Book of British Land Forces 1660–1978. Wakefield, Yorkshire: Microform Academic Publishers. ISBN 1-85117-009-X.
- Joslen, Lt-Col H.F. (1990) [1st. Pub. HMSO:1960]. Orders of Battle, Second World War, 1939–1945. London: London Stamp Exchange. ISBN 0-948130-03-2.
- Perry, F.W. (1993). Order of Battle of Divisions Part 5B. Indian Army Divisions. Newport: Ray Westlake Military Books. ISBN 1-871167-23-X.
