= 6th Regiment, Royal Horse Artillery =

Former horse artillery regiment of the British Army

F Brigade, RHA VI Brigade, RHA 6th Regiment, RHA
- Active: 19 February 1862 – 14 April 1877; 1 March 1901 – 1 October 1914; October 1919 – 8 January 1920; 1 November 1940 – 1948
- Country: United Kingdom
- Branch: British Army
- Type: Artillery
- Size: Battalion

6th Regiment, Royal Horse Artillery was a Regiment of the Royal Horse Artillery that acted as a training formation during World War II. It was the last RHA unit to serve in India between December 1945 and April 1947, before being redesignated as 6th Field Regiment, Royal Artillery in Palestine in 1948.

The regiment had an earlier incarnation as F Brigade, RHA, formed from the 2nd Brigade of the Bengal Horse Artillery in 1862 before being broken up in 1877. It was reestablished in 1901 as VI Brigade, (Note: The basic organic unit of the Royal Artillery was, and is, the Battery. When grouped together they formed brigades, in the same way that infantry battalions or cavalry regiments were grouped together in brigades. At the outbreak of World War I, a field artillery brigade of headquarters (4 officers, 37 other ranks), three batteries (5 and 193 each), and a brigade ammunition column (4 and 154) had a total strength just under 800 so was broadly comparable to an infantry battalion (just over 1,000) or a cavalry regiment (about 550). Like an infantry battalion, an artillery brigade was usually commanded by a Lieutenant-Colonel. Artillery brigades were redesignated as regiments in 1938.) RHA but was broken up at the outbreak of World War I as its constituent batteries were posted to other formations.

== History ==
=== F Brigade, RHA ===
The Bengal Army of the Honourable East India Company formed its first battery of Horse Artillery, the Experimental Brigade, Bengal Horse Artillery on 4 December 1800 (still in existence as F Battery, RHA). By the time the Indian Rebellion of 1857 broke out, the Bengal Horse Artillery had grown to 13 batteries, organized as three brigades. Four of these batteries were manned by sepoys (native Indian soldiers) and two mutinied: 4th Troop, 1st Brigade at Neemuch and 4th Troop, 3rd Brigade at Multan. All four batteries were promptly reformed as European units.

As a result of the Rebellion, the British Crown took direct control of India from the East India Company on 1 November 1858 under the provisions of the Government of India Act 1858. The Presidency armies transferred to the direct authority of the British Crown and its European units were transferred to the British Army. Henceforth artillery, the mutineers most effective arm, was to be the sole preserve of the British Army (with the exception of certain Mountain Artillery batteries). On 19 February 1862, the Bengal Horse Artillery transferred to the Royal Artillery as its 2nd and 5th Horse Brigades. (Note: The original Horse Brigade Royal Artillery formed 1st Horse Brigade RA, the 1st Brigade Bengal Horse Artillery became 2nd Horse Brigade RA, the Madras Horse Artillery became 3rd Horse Brigade RA, the Bombay Horse Artillery became 4th Horse Brigade RA and the 2nd Brigade Bengal Horse Artillery became 5th Horse Brigade RA. The 3rd Brigade Bengal Horse Artillery was split between 2nd and 5th Horse Brigades RA. These brigades performed an administrative, rather than tactical, role.) On transfer, 5th Horse Brigade, Royal Artillery comprised:

- A Battery, 5th Horse Brigade (A/5) - formerly 1st Troop, 2nd Brigade Bengal Horse Artillery (Note: Formed as 2nd Troop, Bengal Horse Artillery on 4 August 1809, later K Battery, RHA.) at Rawalpindi
- B Battery, 5th Horse Brigade (B/5) - formerly 2nd Troop, 2nd Brigade Bengal Horse Artillery (Note: Formed as The Rocket Troop, Bengal Artillery on 13 September 1816, transferred to Royal Artillery on 1 April 1887; later 52nd Battery, RA.) at Meerut
- C Battery, 5th Horse Brigade (C/5) - formerly 3rd Troop, 2nd Brigade Bengal Horse Artillery (Note: Formed as 3rd Troop, 2nd Brigade Bengal Horse Artillery on 1 July 1825; transferred to Royal Artillery on 1 February 1884 as Depot Battery, 4th Brigade, RA.) at Ambala
- D Battery, 5th Horse Brigade (D/5) - formerly 4th Troop, 2nd Brigade Bengal Horse Artillery (Note: Formed as 1st Brigade of Gallopers, Bengal Artillery on 21 July 1817, later W Battery, RHA.) at Mian Mir
- E Battery, 5th Horse Brigade (E/5) - formerly 3rd Troop, 3rd Brigade Bengal Horse Artillery (Note: Formed as 3rd Troop, 3rd Brigade Bengal Horse Artillery on 1 October 1826, later S Battery, RHA.) at Mian Mir
- F Battery, 5th Horse Brigade (F/5) - formerly 4th Troop, 3rd Brigade Bengal Horse Artillery (Note: Formed as 3rd Brigade of Gallopers, Bengal Artillery on 3 October 1817, later X Battery, RHA.) at Ambala

The 1st Brigade with 10 batteries was much larger than the other four (with four to seven batteries each). A reorganization of the Horse Artillery on 13 April 1864 saw 1st Brigade split as A and B Brigades, 2nd Brigade become C Brigade, 3rd become D Brigade, 4th become E Brigade, and 5th become F Horse Brigade, Royal Artillery. As battery designations were tied to the brigade the battery was assigned to, the batteries were also redesignated. The new designations were in order of seniority. F Horse Brigade, RA now comprised:

- A Battery, F Horse Brigade (A/F) - formerly A/5 Battery at Ambala
- B Battery, F Horse Brigade (B/F) - formerly B/5 Battery at Peshawar
- C Battery, F Horse Brigade (C/F) - formerly C/5 Battery at Ambala
- D Battery, F Horse Brigade (D/F) - formerly E/5 Battery at Peshawar
- E Battery, F Horse Brigade (E/F) - formerly D/5 Battery at Mian Mir
- F Battery, F Horse Brigade (F/F) - formerly F/5 Battery at Sialkot

From 1866, the term "Royal Horse Artillery" appeared in Army List hence the brigade was designated F Brigade, Royal Horse Artillery from about this time. Another reorganization on 14 April 1877 saw the number of brigades reduced to three (of 10 batteries each) and F Brigade was broken up. Its batteries were mostly transferred to C Brigade and redesignated again, for example, A/F Battery becoming F Battery, C Brigade.

The number of brigades was further reduced to two (of 13 batteries each) in 1882. The brigade system was finally abolished in 1889. Henceforth, batteries were designated in a single alphabetical sequence in order of seniority from date of formation.

=== VI Brigade, RHA ===
==== First formation ====
The brigade system was revived in 1901. Each brigade now commanded just two batteries and a small staff (a Lieutenant-Colonel in command, an adjutant and a brigade sergeant major). Initially, batteries were not assigned to brigades in any particular order, but in 1906, at the insistence of Edward VII, brigades were redesignated so that batteries were roughly in order of seniority (hence I Brigade commanded A Battery and B Battery).

VI Brigade, RHA was formed on 1 March 1901 as the VII Brigade-Division, RHA with H Battery and K Battery. In 1903 it was redesignated as VII Brigade, RHA and was stationed at Meerut. On 1 October 1906, it was redesignated as VI Brigade, RHA.

By the time World War I broke out, the brigade was stationed at Trowbridge attached to 2nd Cavalry Brigade. H Battery was at Trowbridge and on 28 September was assigned to VII Brigade, RHA in 1st Cavalry Division as a permanent replacement for L Battery which had been almost destroyed at Néry. K Battery was at Christchurch and on 1 October was assigned to XV (later IV) Brigade, RHA in 3rd Cavalry Division. With the departure of its batteries, the brigade HQ was dissolved.

==== Second formation ====
By October 1919, VI Brigade, RHA was reformed at Shorncliffe in the United Kingdom with

- V Battery, RHA from 7th Indian Cavalry Brigade in Mesopotamia in May 1919
- W Battery, RHA from 11th Indian Cavalry Brigade in Mesopotamia in May 1919
- X Battery, RHA from XVII Brigade, RHA in Germany in early 1919 (Note: XVII Brigade, RHA was broken up on 17 April 1918. Clarke states that X Battery, RHA left the brigade on 8 October 1917. This disagrees with Frederick which says it was still with the brigade in April 1918. Perry implies that it was still with the brigade in March 1918 but elsewhere states that the battery joined 4th (Meerut) Cavalry Brigade, 7th Meerut Divisional Area in India in January 1918.)

This new incarnation was short-lived, however. On 8 January 1920, the Headquarters was absorbed into the HQ of 8th Brigade, Royal Field Artillery. On 4 May 1920, V, W, and X Batteries were converted to 137th, 138th and 139th Batteries, RFA in 8th Brigade, RFA.

=== 6th Regiment, RHA ===
6th Regiment, RHA was formed on 1 November 1940 at Bulwick, Northamptonshire from a cadre of 5th Regiment, RHA. Initially, it commanded 1, 2 and 3 batteries until they took on the identities of N, O and P batteries. In March 1941, P Battery, RHA left 3rd Regiment, RHA and returned to the UK. In February 1942, O Battery, RHA was unlinked from B/O Battery of 1st Regiment, RHA and returned to the UK. In April 1942, N Battery, RHA was unlinked from I/N Battery of 2nd Regiment, RHA and returned to the UK.

The regiment did not see active service in World War II, instead it remained in England as a training formation to provide officers and men to the other regiments. On 4 December 1940 it was assigned to the 9th Support Group of 9th Armoured Division and remained with the division when 9th Support Group was disbanded on 12 June 1942. It remained under command of 9th Armoured Division until 10 July 1944. 9th Armoured Division was disbanded shortly thereafter.

In December 1945 the regiment was posted to India, the last RHA unit to serve there. On 29 April 1947, the regiment departed Bombay (Mumbai) for Port Said, Egypt arriving on 8 May. It was posted to the Canal Zone, serving there until October, before moving to Palestine on internal security duties.

In 1948, 6th Regiment RHA reverted to RA status as 6th Field Regiment, Royal Artillery. N Battery transferred to 4th Regiment, RHA just before conversion, with W Battery, RHA replacing it.

== Bibliography ==
- Becke, Archibald F. (1935). Order of Battle of Divisions Part 1–The Regular British Divisions. London: HMSO. OCLC 4405016.
- Clarke, W.G. (1993). Horse Gunners: The Royal Horse Artillery, 200 Years of Panache and Professionalism. Woolwich: The Royal Artillery Institution. ISBN 09520762-0-9.
- Frederick, J.B.M. (1984). Lineage Book of British Land Forces 1660-1978. Wakefield, Yorkshire: Microform Academic Publishers. ISBN 1-85117-009-X.
- Joslen, Lt-Col H.F. (1990) [1st. Pub. HMSO:1960]. Orders of Battle, Second World War, 1939–1945. London: London Stamp Exchange. ISBN 0-948130-03-2.
- Perry, F.W. (1993). Order of Battle of Divisions Part 5B. Indian Army Divisions. Newport: Ray Westlake Military Books. ISBN 1-871167-23-X.
