= XII Brigade, Royal Horse Artillery =

Former horse artillery brigade of the British Army

XII Brigade, RHA
- Active: 1 March 1901 – November 1917
- Country: United Kingdom
- Branch: British Army
- Type: Artillery
- Size: Battalion

XII Brigade, Royal Horse Artillery was a brigade (Note: The basic organic unit of the Royal Artillery was, and is, the Battery. When grouped together they formed brigades, in the same way that infantry battalions or cavalry regiments were grouped together in brigades. At the outbreak of World War I, a field artillery brigade of headquarters (4 officers, 37 other ranks), three batteries (5 and 193 each), and a brigade ammunition column (4 and 154) had a total strength just under 800 so was broadly comparable to an infantry battalion (just over 1,000) or a cavalry regiment (about 550). Like an infantry battalion, an artillery brigade was usually commanded by a Lieutenant-Colonel. Artillery brigades were redesignated as regiments in 1938.) of the Royal Horse Artillery which existed in the early part of the 20th century. It was dissolved during World War I as its constituent batteries were posted to other formations.

== History ==
=== Background ===
Royal Horse Artillery brigades did not exist as an organizational or operational grouping of batteries until 1 July 1859 when the Horse Brigade, Royal Artillery was formed. The brigade system was extended to five (later six) brigades when the horse artillery of the Honourable East India Company had been transferred to the British Army in 1861. These brigades were reduced to five in 1871, then to three (of 10 batteries each) in 1877 and to two (of 13 batteries each) in 1882. The brigade system was finally abolished in 1889.

As battery designations were tied to the brigade that the battery was assigned to, batteries were redesignated in a bewildering sequence as they were transferred between brigades. For example, E Battery of C Brigade (E/C Bty) might become N Battery of A Brigade (N/A Bty) upon transfer. Henceforth, batteries were designated in a single alphabetical sequence in order of seniority from date of formation.

The brigade system was revived in 1901. Each brigade now commanded just two batteries and a small staff (a Lieutenant-Colonel in command, an adjutant and a brigade sergeant major). Initially, batteries were not assigned to brigades in any particular order, but in 1906, at the insistence of Edward VII, brigades were redesignated so that batteries were roughly in order of seniority (hence I Brigade commanded A Battery and B Battery).

=== Formation ===
XII Brigade, RHA was formed on 1 March 1901 as the II Brigade-Division, RHA with V Battery and W Battery. In 1903 it was redesignated as II Brigade, RHA and was stationed at Woolwich. On 1 October 1906, it was redesignated as XII Brigade, RHA.

By the time World War I broke out, the brigade was in Meerut, India assigned to 7th (Meerut) Division. On mobilization, V Battery was assigned to the newly formed II Indian Brigade, RHA with 2nd Indian Cavalry Division (attached to 7th (Meerut) Cavalry Brigade) and sailed for the Western Front in November 1914. W Battery moved to Sialkot and joined the 2nd (Rawalpindi) Division in October 1914. It returned to the 7th (Meerut) Divisional Area where it joined 4th (Meerut) Cavalry Brigade in February 1915. In November 1917 it departed for Mesopotamia where it joined the 11th Indian Cavalry Brigade. With the departure of its batteries, the brigade HQ was dissolved.

== See also ==
- 12th Regiment, Royal Horse Artillery (Honourable Artillery Company) for a similarly numbered regiment in World War II.

== Bibliography ==
- Clarke, W.G. (1993). Horse Gunners: The Royal Horse Artillery, 200 Years of Panache and Professionalism. Woolwich: The Royal Artillery Institution. ISBN 09520762-0-9.
- Frederick, J.B.M. (1984). Lineage Book of British Land Forces 1660-1978. Wakefield, Yorkshire: Microform Academic Publishers. ISBN 1-85117-009-X.
- Perry, F.W. (1993). Order of Battle of Divisions Part 5B. Indian Army Divisions. Newport: Ray Westlake Military Books. ISBN 1-871167-23-X.
