= XVII Brigade, Royal Horse Artillery =

Former horse artillery brigade of the British Army

II Indian Brigade, RHA XVII Brigade, RHA XVII Army Brigade, RHA
- Active: December 1914 – 17 April 1918
- Country: United Kingdom
- Branch: British Army
- Type: Artillery
- Size: Battalion
- Part of: 2nd Indian Cavalry Division
- Engagements: World War I Western Front

II Indian Brigade, Royal Horse Artillery was a brigade (Note: The basic organic unit of the Royal Artillery was, and is, the Battery. When grouped together they formed brigades, in the same way that infantry battalions or cavalry regiments were grouped together in brigades. At the outbreak of World War I, a field artillery brigade of headquarters (4 officers, 37 other ranks), three batteries (5 and 193 each), and a brigade ammunition column (4 and 154) had a total strength just under 800 so was broadly comparable to an infantry battalion (just over 1,000) or a cavalry regiment (about 550). Like an infantry battalion, an artillery brigade was usually commanded by a Lieutenant-Colonel. Artillery brigades were redesignated as regiments in 1938.) of the Royal Horse Artillery formed at the outbreak of World War I. It served with the 2nd Indian Cavalry Division on the Western Front. It was redesignated XVII Brigade, RHA in February 1917 and XVII Army Brigade, RHA just before being disbanded in April 1918.

== History ==
=== II Indian Brigade, RHA ===
II Indian Brigade, RHA was formed in December 1914 for the 2nd Indian Cavalry Division in France. It commanded

- N Battery, RHA from IX Brigade, RHA at Secunderabad, India
- V Battery, RHA from XII Brigade, RHA at Meerut, India
- X Battery, RHA from XIII Brigade, RHA at Mhow, India
- II Indian RHA Brigade Ammunition Column

Each battery was armed with six 13 pounder guns.

The brigade served with the 2nd Indian Cavalry Division on the Western Front and the brigade commander acted as Commander Royal Horse Artillery (CRHA). In practice, the batteries were permanently assigned to the cavalry brigades, viz:

- N Battery with 9th (Secunderabad) Cavalry Brigade
- V Battery with 7th (Meerut) Cavalry Brigade
- X Battery with 5th (Mhow) Cavalry Brigade then 3rd (Ambala) Cavalry Brigade from 15 September 1915 when it arrived from 1st Indian Cavalry Division

In June 1916, 7th (Meerut) Cavalry Brigade (complete with V Battery, RHA) left the division and was reformed for service in Mesopotamia. Its place was taken by the Canadian Cavalry Brigade with its attached Royal Canadian Horse Artillery Brigade (A and B Batteries, RCHA each with four 13 pounders).

Other than the Battle of the Somme in 1916 (Battle of Bazentin Ridge, 14–17 July and Battle of Flers-Courcelette, 15–22 September) and the Battle of Cambrai in 1917, the division was not involved in the battle. Instead, it was held in reserve in case of a breakthrough, although it did send parties to the trenches on several occasions. They would hold the line, or act as Pioneers; such parties were designated as, for example, the Mhow Battalion.

=== XVII Brigade, RHA ===
On 26 November 1916, 2nd Indian Cavalry Division was renamed 5th Cavalry Division. Consequently, on 24 February 1917, the brigade was redesignated as XVII Brigade, RHA.

In March 1918, the 5th Cavalry Division was broken up in France. The British and Canadian units remained in France and the Indian elements were sent to Egypt to help constitute 2nd Mounted Division. The brigade became XVII Army Brigade, RHA (Note: Army Brigades, RHA and RFA were artillery brigades that were excess to the needs of the divisions, withdrawn to form an artillery reserve.) at this time, though this new identity was short lived.

On 13 March, G Battery, RHA joined from IV Brigade, RHA (3rd Cavalry Division) to bring the brigade back up to three batteries. On 9 April, G and N Batteries, RHA left for V Army Brigade, RHA. (Note: Frederick says N Battery joined V Army Brigade, RHA on 13 January 1917. Perry claims the N Battery was still with XVII Brigade, RHA in March 1918.) On 17 April 1918, the brigade HQ was dissolved. (Note: Clarke states that X Battery, RHA left the brigade on 8 October 1917. This disagrees with Frederick which says it was still with the brigade in April 1918. Perry implies that it was still with the brigade in March 1918 but elsewhere states that the battery joined 4th (Meerut) Cavalry Brigade, 7th Meerut Divisional Area in India in January 1918. Post-war, X Battery RHA joined VI Brigade, Royal Horse Artillery from Germany in early 1919.)

== Bibliography ==
- Clarke, W.G. (1993). Horse Gunners: The Royal Horse Artillery, 200 Years of Panache and Professionalism. Woolwich: The Royal Artillery Institution. ISBN 09520762-0-9.
- Frederick, J.B.M. (1984). Lineage Book of British Land Forces 1660-1978. Wakefield, Yorkshire: Microform Academic Publishers. ISBN 1-85117-009-X.
- Perry, F.W. (1993). Order of Battle of Divisions Part 5B. Indian Army Divisions. Newport: Ray Westlake Military Books. ISBN 1-871167-23-X.
