= Cavalry Division (India) =

The Cavalry Division
- Active: 8 December 1916 – 8 April 1918
- Country: British India
- Allegiance: British Crown
- Branch: British Indian Army
- Type: Cavalry
- Size: Division
- Engagements: World War I Mesopotamian Campaign Second Battle of Kut Battles of Ramadi (1917)

Commanders
- Notable commanders: Sydney Francis Crocker; Leslie Cockburn Jones

The Cavalry Division was formed in 1916 during First World War by units of the British Army and the British Indian Army stationed in India for service in Mesopotamia in the Mesopotamia Campaign. The Division was broken up in 1918, but its brigades then served independently.

== 6th Indian Cavalry Brigade ==
The 6th Indian Cavalry Brigade commanded the following units while assigned to the division:

- 14th (King's) Hussars
- 21st Prince Albert Victor’s Own Cavalry (Frontier Force)
- 22nd Sam Browne's Cavalry (Frontier Force)
- 15th Machine Gun Squadron
- S Battery, Royal Horse Artillery
- 2nd Troop, 2nd Queen Victoria's Own Madras Miners and Sappers
- 6th Cavalry Brigade Signal Troop
- 131st Combined Cavalry Field Ambulance
- 5th Mobile Veterinary Section
- 6th Cavalry Brigade Supply and Transport Company

== 7th Indian Cavalry Brigade ==
The 7th Indian Cavalry Brigade commanded the following units while assigned to the division:

- 13th Hussars
- 13th Duke of Connaught's Lancers (Watson's Horse)
- 14th Murray's Jat Lancers
- 16th Machine Gun Squadron
- V Battery, Royal Horse Artillery
- Field Troop, Royal Engineers
- 7th Cavalry Brigade Signal Troop
- 119th Combined Cavalry Field Ambulance
- 4th Mobile Veterinary Section
- 7th Cavalry Brigade Supply and Transport Company

The 7th Indian Cavalry Brigade later served as an independent brigade when the Division was broken up. In 1918 it fought at the Battle of Sharqat and was present at the occupation of Mosul at the end of the campaign, shortly after the armistice.

== 11th Indian Cavalry Brigade ==
The 11th Indian Cavalry Brigade served as an independent brigade when the Division was broken up. It was formed in September 1917 from three cavalry regiments sent from India and an artillery battery sent from the Western Front. Its machinegun squadron and other support units were assembled in Mesopotamia. It fought at the action of Khan Baghdadi and the Battle of Sharqat. It also was present at the occupation of Mosul at the end of the campaign.

- 7th (Queen's Own) Hussars
- Guides Cavalry
- 23rd Cavalry (Frontier Force)
- 25th Machine Gun Squadron
- W Battery, Royal Horse Artillery
- 5th Troop, 1st King George's Own Sappers and Miners
- 11th Cavalry Brigade Signal Troop
- 152nd Combined Cavalry Field Ambulance
- 8th Mobile Veterinary Section
- 11th Cavalry Brigade Supply and Transport Company

== See also ==
- List of Indian divisions in World War I

== Bibliography ==
- Moberly, Frederick James (1927) [1923]. The Campaign in Mesopotamia 1914–1918. History of the Great War Based on Official Documents. Vol. I. London: HMSO. OCLC 772784341.
- Perry, F.W. (1993). Order of Battle of Divisions Part 5B. Indian Army Divisions. Newport: Ray Westlake Military Books. ISBN 1-871167-23-X.
