= 7th Indian Cavalry Brigade =

Meerut Brigade Meerut Cavalry Brigade 7th (Meerut) Cavalry Brigade 7th Indian Cavalry Brigade
- Active: 1 November 1904 – November 1920
- Country: British India
- Allegiance: British Crown
- Branch: British Indian Army
- Type: Cavalry
- Size: Brigade
- Part of: 7th (Meerut) Division; 2nd Indian Cavalry Division; Cavalry Division (Mesopotamia)
- Peacetime HQ: Meerut
- Engagements: First World War Western Front Mesopotamian Campaign Kut al Amara 1917 Battle of Baghdad (1917) Battle of Sharqat

Commanders
- Notable commanders: Br.-Gen. W.E. Peyton

The Meerut Cavalry Brigade was a cavalry brigade of the British Indian Army formed in 1904 as a result of the Kitchener Reforms. It was mobilized as 7th (Meerut) Cavalry Brigade at the outbreak of the First World War and departed for the Western Front where it served as part of the 2nd Indian Cavalry Division.

It was reorganized in June 1916 as 7th Indian Cavalry Brigade and took part in the Mesopotamian campaign. It formed part of the occupation forces for Mesopotamia after the end of the war and was broken up late in 1920.

== History ==
The Kitchener Reforms, carried out during Lord Kitchener's tenure as Commander-in-Chief, India (1902–09), completed the unification of the three former Presidency armies, the Punjab Frontier Force, the Hyderabad Contingent and other local forces into one Indian Army. Kitchener identified the Indian Army's main task as the defence of the North-West Frontier against foreign aggression (particularly Russian expansion into Afghanistan) with internal security relegated to a secondary role. The Army was organized into divisions and brigades that would act as field formations but also included internal security troops.

The Meerut Brigade was formed in November 1904 (Note: 1 November 1904 was the appointment date of the brigade's first commanding officer.) as a result of the Kitchener Reforms. The brigade formed part of the 7th (Meerut) Division. In 1908, it was redesignated as Meerut Cavalry Brigade.

=== 7th (Meerut) Cavalry Brigade ===
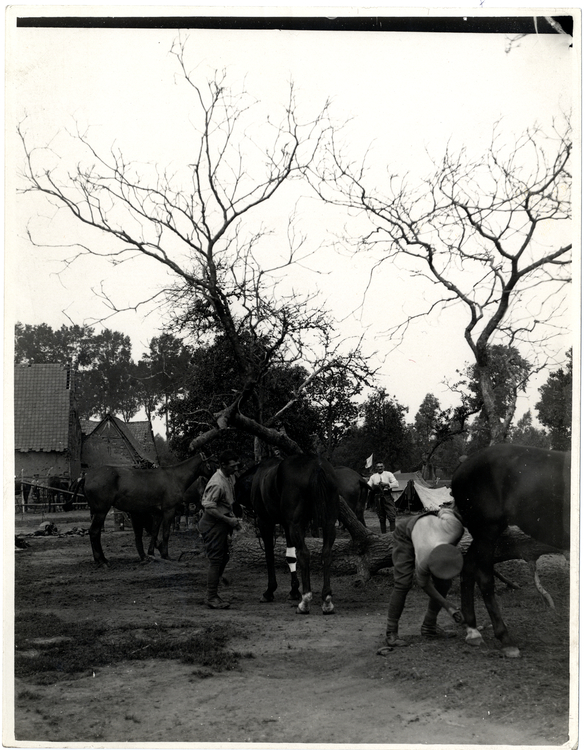
13th Hussars horselines and bivouacs Aire, France, 25 July 1915

In August 1914, the brigade was mobilized as the 7th (Meerut) Cavalry Brigade. In company with the newly formed 5th (Mhow) Cavalry Brigade, it departed Bombay on 19 November 1914 and landed at Marseille on 14–16 December. It joined the 2nd Indian Cavalry Division which was formally constituted on 14 December. The division concentrated around Orléans on 20–24 December and moved up to the Front on 1–4 January 1915. While in France, the brigade was known by its geographical rather than numerical designation so as to avoid confusion with the British 7th Cavalry Brigade also serving on the Western Front at the same time.

The brigade did not take part in any significant actions while on the Western Front. Instead, it was held in reserve in case of a breakthrough, although it did send parties to the trenches on a number of occasions. They would hold the line, or act as Pioneers; such parties were designated as the Meerut Battalion.

In June 1916, the brigade was extensively reorganized and was sent to Mesopotamia:

- 3rd Skinner's Horse went to 2nd (Rawalpindi) Division
- 18th King George's Own Tiwana Lancers transferred to 3rd (Ambala) Cavalry Brigade and was replaced by 30th Lancers (Gordon's Horse) which in turn joined the 1st (Peshawar) Division in August 1916.
- 13th Duke of Connaught's Lancers (Watson's Horse) joined from the 1st (Peshawar) Division
- 14th Murray's Jat Lancers joined from the 1st (Peshawar) Division

=== 7th Indian Cavalry Brigade ===
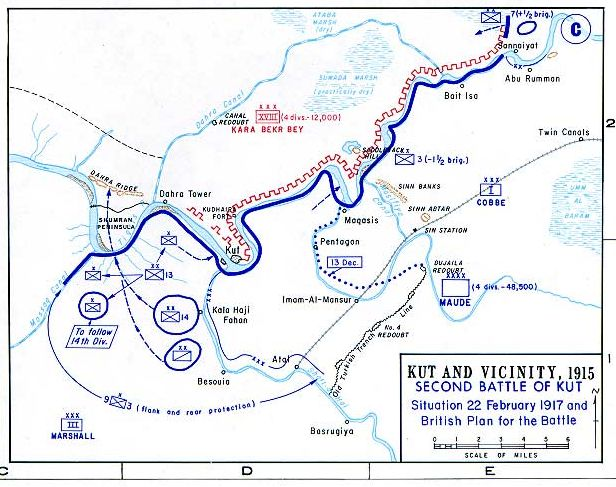
Situation at Kut on 22 February 1917

The brigade arrived in Mesopotamia in August 1916 where it served as an independent brigade, as part of the Cavalry Division from 8 December 1916 to 8 April 1918, and as an independent brigade to the end of the war.

With the division, it took part in the Second Battle of Kut including the Advance to the Hai and Capture of the Khudaira Bend (14 December 1916 – 19 January 1917), the Capture of the Hai Salient (25 January–5 February 1917), and the Capture of the Dahra Bend (9–16 February).

It then took part in the Pursuit to Baghdad and a number of actions later in 1917. In 1918 it took part in the Affair of Kulawand (27 April), the action of Tuz Khurmatli (29 April), the action at Fat-ha Gorge on the Little Zab (23–26 October 1918), and the Battle of Sharqat (28–30 October 1918) under the command of I Corps.

After the Armistice of Mudros, the brigade was selected to form part of the occupation forces for Mesopotamia. The brigade was finally broken up in late 1920.

== Orders of battle ==
In India in August 1914
At the outbreak of the First World War, the brigade had the following composition:
- 13th Hussars
- 3rd Skinner's Horse
- 18th King George's Own Tiwana Lancers
- 3rd Battalion, King's Royal Rifle Corps (left Bombay on 15 October 1914 to join British 27th Division)
- 107th Pioneers (joined 7th (Meerut) Division as pioneers)

Western Front
The brigade's composition on the Western Front included:
- 13th Hussars
- 3rd Skinner's Horse (Note: Perry mistakenly refers to the 9th Skinner's Horse. The 9th Hodson's Horse was in the 3rd (Ambala) Cavalry Brigade.)
- 18th King George's Own Tiwana Lancers
- V Battery, Royal Horse Artillery (joined in September 1914 from XII Brigade, Royal Horse Artillery at Meerut) (Note: V Battery, Royal Horse Artillery was assigned to II Indian Brigade, Royal Horse Artillery but in practice was permanently attached to the brigade.)
- 15th Machine Gun Squadron (joined in February 1916)

Mesopotamia
The brigade included the following units in Mesoptoamia:
- 13th Hussars
- 13th Duke of Connaught's Lancers (Watson's Horse)
- 14th Murray's Jat Lancers
- V Battery, Royal Horse Artillery
- 7th Machine Gun Squadron (formed in May 1916)
- 16th Machine Gun Squadron (renumbered from 6th in May 1917)
- Field Troop, Royal Engineers
- 7th Cavalry Brigade Signal Troop
- 119th Combined Cavalry Field Ambulance
- 4th Mobile Veterinary Section
- 7th Cavalry Brigade Supply and Transport Company

== Commanders ==
The Meerut Brigade / Meerut Cavalry Brigade / 7th (Meerut) Cavalry Brigade / 7th Indian Cavalry Brigade had the following commanders:

From	Rank	Name	Notes
1 November 1904	Brigadier-General	A. Phayre	
April 1908	Major-General	J.A.H. Pollock	
3 July 1908	Brigadier-General	W.E. Peyton	
2 May 1911	Brigadier-General	E. B. Burton	
19 September 1913	Brigadier-General	FitzJ. M. Edwards	
27 May 1916	Brigadier-General	L.C. Jones	
12 May 1917	Brigadier-General	C.E.G. Norton	
April 1919	Brigadier-General	H.G. Young	Broken up in November 1920

== See also ==
- 4th (Meerut) Cavalry Brigade
- Indian Cavalry Corps order of battle First World War
- Indian Expeditionary Force A

== Bibliography ==
- Haythornthwaite, Philip J. (1996). The World War One Source Book. London: Arms and Armour Press. ISBN 1-85409-351-7.
- Mackie, Colin (June 2015). "Army Commands 1900-2011" (PDF). www.gulabin.com. Archived from the original (PDF) on 5 July 2015.
- Moberly, Frederick James (1927) [1923]. The Campaign in Mesopotamia 1914–1918. History of the Great War Based on Official Documents. Vol. I. London: HMSO. OCLC 772784341.
- Perry, F.W. (1993). Order of Battle of Divisions Part 5B. Indian Army Divisions. Newport: Ray Westlake Military Books. ISBN 1-871167-23-X.
