= P Battery (The Dragon Troop) Royal Artillery =

British Army artillery battery

P Battery (The Dragon Troop) RA
- Active: 23 December 1816 – present
- Country: United Kingdom
- Allegiance: Hon East India Coy (until 1858); United Kingdom (post 1858)
- Branch: British Army
- Type: Artillery
- Role: Surveillance and Target Acquisition
- Size: Battery
- Part of: 5th Regiment Royal Artillery
- Location: Catterick Garrison
- Nickname: The Dragon Troop
- Anniversaries: Chin-Kiang Day 21 July
- Equipment: COBRA, MAMBA, LCMR, ASP
- Battle honours: Ubique

P Battery (The Dragon Troop) is a battery of 5th Regiment, Royal Artillery in the Royal Regiment of Artillery. It currently serves in the Surveillance and Target Acquisition role and is equipped with weapon platform locating equipment, which include radar and sound ranging systems.

== History ==
The Rocket Troop Madras Horse Artillery was formed in 1805, at the request of the Madras Government and East India Company and it served in the Pindari and Mahratta Wars 1817–1819. It was re-designated as C Troop, Madras Horse Artillery in 1825.

In 1840, the Troop was sent to China as part of an expeditionary force to fight in the First Opium War. Then in 1841, it provided artillery support for a combined land and sea force assaulted the formidable line of forts guarding the mouth of the Xi River, which cleared the way for an attack on Canton (now known as Guangzhou). For its contribution in the campaign, 'C' Troop was conferred the honorary title 'Dragon', and was given permission to include the Chinese dragon and the years '1840–1842' as part of its insignia.

The Troop then served in the second Burma War between 1853 and 1855, and after much renaming, it became 'P' Battery Royal Horse Artillery in 1889. The Battery subsequently served in the Boer War 1900–1902 and as a training Battery during the First World War. The battery was part of M/P Battery in 3rd Regiment, Royal Horse Artillery (3 RHA) at the start of the Second World War and was equipped with the 2-pounder anti-tank guns. It later became P battery, consisting of A, B and C troops at this time, still serving with 3rd RHA until the battery ceased to be part of the Regiment on 15 March 1941. After having its farewell dinner on 10 March, the higher regiment returned to the UK to be reformed as part of 6th Regiment, Royal Horse Artillery (6 RHA). Many NCO's and men were absorbed by other Batteries of 3 RHA. The battery then served in 6 RHA, seeing service in Palestine, Libya and the Central Zone until 1951 and becoming 'P' Field Battery Royal Artillery in 1958.

== See also ==
- British Army
- Royal Artillery
- Royal Horse Artillery
- List of Royal Artillery Batteries
- Madras Horse Artillery Batteries

== Bibliography ==
- Clarke, W.G. (1993). Horse Gunners: The Royal Horse Artillery, 200 Years of Panache and Professionalism. Woolwich: The Royal Artillery Institution. ISBN 09520762-0-9.
