= Roulement =

Short deployments in the British Army

Roulement is a term used by the British Army to signify major combat units (usually battalion strength) that are deployed on short tours of duty, normally for six months. It is also used in the wider British military to mean the deployment of a strength of personnel on continuing operations. Translated from the French language, roulement means "rolling".

The British Army has historically deployed infantry battalions for 6-month and 24-month roulement tours of Northern Ireland. Other corps such as the Royal Armoured Corps (R.A.C.), when being used as infantry, are deployed only on 4-month tours. During Operation Banner, this was more to do with the cost of re-training back to role than any operational reason. An R.A.C. crewman cost an estimated £500,000 to train and skills were lost during any longer tour. Royal Marine commando battalions and Royal Artillery serving as infantry in Northern Ireland are also roulement units.

The British Army deployed roulement units to Afghanistan as part of Operation Herrick. The British Army currently deploys roulement units to the Falkland Islands and to Cyprus on Operation TOSCA with the United Nations.
