= 1st Regiment Royal Horse Artillery =

Regiment of the Royal Horse Artillery in the British Army

5th Brigade Royal Horse Artillery 1st Brigade Royal Horse Artillery 1st Regiment Royal Horse Artillery
- Active: 1939–Present
- Country: United Kingdom
- Branch: British Army
- Type: Field Artillery regiment
- Role: Armoured Artillery Support
- Size: Regiment; 506 personnel
- Part of: 3rd Deep Reconnaissance Strike Brigade
- Garrison/HQ: Assaye Barracks, Larkhill Garrison
- Nicknames: The South Yorks & Midland Gunners
- Engagements: World War I; World War II; Aden Emergency; Operation Banner; Bosnian War; Operation Telic; Operation Herrick

Commanders
- Notable commanders: Timothy Granville-Chapman

1st Regiment Royal Horse Artillery is a regiment of the Royal Horse Artillery in the British Army. It currently serves in the armoured field artillery role, and was equipped with the AS90 self-propelled gun, until it was retired from service in 2025. The regiment is currently based at Larkhill Garrison, Larkhill. The regiment completed its move from Assaye Barracks, Tidworth, to Larkhill in June 2019.

== History ==
=== Formation ===
The regiment was formed as 5th Brigade Royal Horse Artillery in March 1901 and was renamed 1st Brigade Royal Horse Artillery in October 1906. It served in Iraq in 1920, returned to the UK in 1923 and served in Egypt in 1931, before returning to the UK again in 1936. It was renamed 1st Regiment Royal Horse Artillery on 1 May 1938.

=== Second World War ===
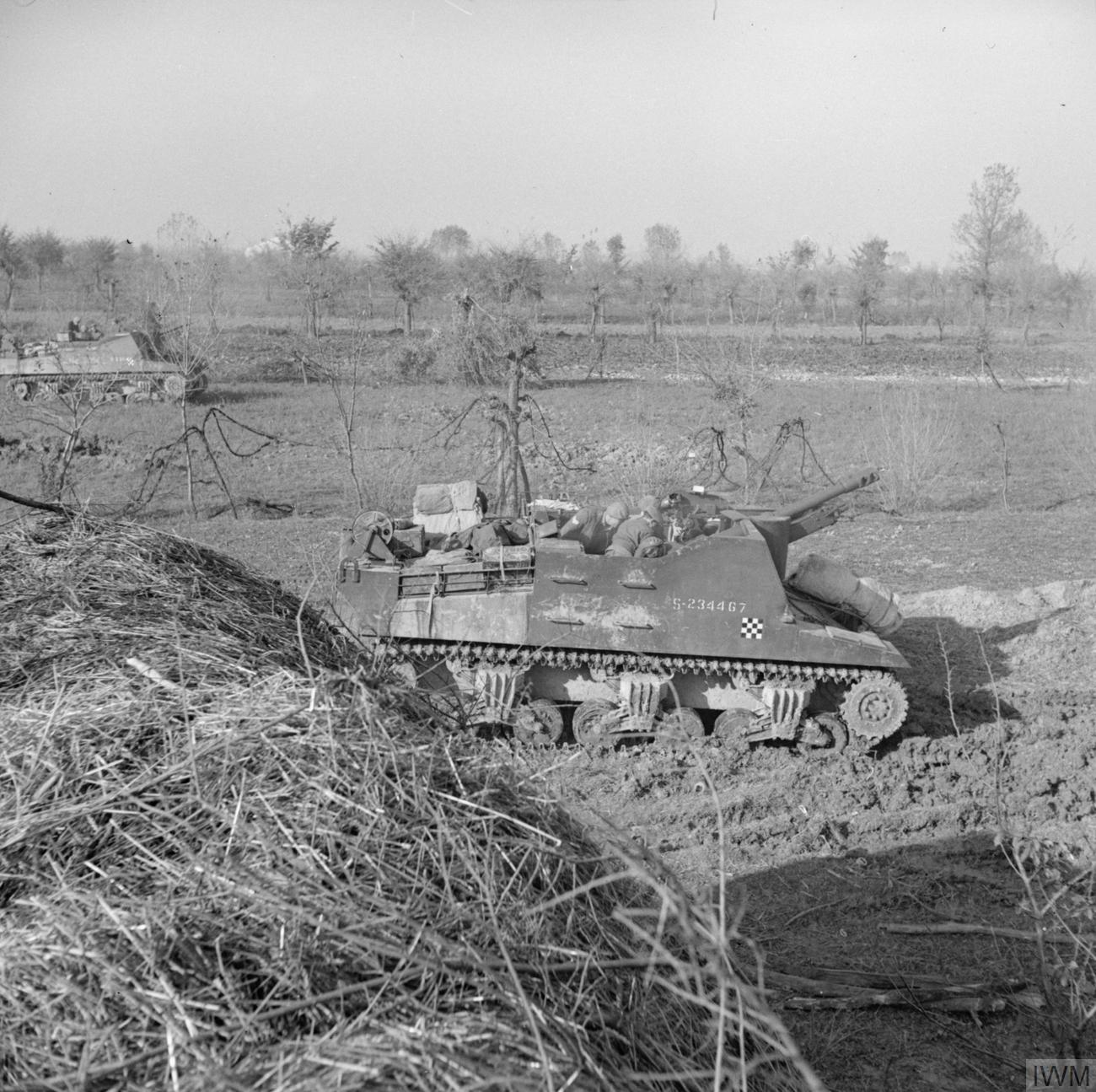
Sexton 25pdr self-propelled gun of 1st Royal Horse Artillery, operating as part of 'Porter Force' on the Adriatic coast near Ravenna, 1 December 1944. (IWM NA20334)

In 1939, 1 RHA was part of 51st (Highland) Infantry Division, and fought at Saint Valery. The regiment was captured after severe fighting, but some batteries managed to escape after the Battle of Dunkirk. The regiment reformed and was deployed to Northern Africa in late 1940, where it arrived with the Middle East Command in October 1940 and took a large part in Wavell's campaign which opened on 9 December 1940. The most notable actions were those during the Siege of Tobruk and all the batteries fought during the fierce fighting just before El Alamein and then the First and Second Battles of El Alamein itself.

1 RHA then joined 10 Armoured Division in Aleppo and spent the next year training all over Syria, Palestine and the Suez Canal Zone. 1 RHA then landed in Italy from Palestine in May 1944 at Taranto, and were in action south of Rome on 15 May 1944 and thereafter played a full part in the remainder of the Italian Campaign and finished the war in Italy.

=== Cold War ===
The regiment saw service as follows: 1 RHA was stationed in Palestine after the Second World War, during the period of terrorist activity that led to the creation of the State of Israel. 1 RHA returned to England as part of 6th Armoured Division at Westdown Camp in 1951. in 1952 1 RHA moved to Münster in West Germany, where they remained until 1958 as part of the 20th Armoured Brigade of 6th Armoured Division. In 1958, it moved to Hildesheim, where it was equipped with the M44 self-propelled howitzer.

In 1965, RHA deployed to Aden with three batteries (each split into three independent two-gun sections), where they supported British battalions in the Radfan, and South Arabian battalions on the Yemeni border. On returning from the region, the regiment was based at Kirkee Barracks, Colchester Garrison and subsequently renamed as 1st Field Regiment Royal Horse Artillery, and its batteries also taking the new designation. The regiment was then equipped with the 105mm Pack Howitzer, and assigned to the 19th Infantry Brigade.

Elements of 1 RHA were deployed on Operation Banner in November 1969. As part of support to support 3rd Infantry Brigade, units were deployed to Long Kesh and Belfast City Centre. After returning from Northern Ireland, the regiment was granted the Freedom of the City of Nottingham. In May 1970 they moved to Hobart Barracks in Detmold and equipped with the new Green Archer Radar and joined CRA, 4th Armoured Division in support of the 20th Armoured Brigade.

The regiment then deployed to Northern Ireland on Operation Banner three more times, Sep 72 - Jan 73 in Long Kesh, Mar - Jul 74 in Belfast (City Central), and Mar - Jun 76 Belfast (Grand Central/City Centre). In September 1976, the regiment was equipped with the new Cymbeline radar, and the batteries re-equipped with the FV433 Abbot SPG, and E Bty subsequently became an independent abbot bty. In March 1977 the regiment moved to Alanbrooke Barracks, Topcliffe and E bty remained for one year until joining the regiment again in March 1978. In 1979 the regiment was re-equipped with the new FH70 155mm Field Howizer and joined the 24th Airportable Brigade.

In April 1982 the regiment moved to back to Germany, and was based at Haig Barracks, Hohne Garrison, re-equipped with the Abbot 105mm and joined CRA, 1st Armoured Division, and from 1988 in the close support role for the 22nd Armoured Brigade. Just after moving back to Germany, the regiment gained D Battery from 49 Field Regiment Royal Artillery, but in April 1984 that battery moved to 3rd Regiment Royal Horse Artillery.

When the Cold War ended in 1990, the Options for Change reforms were published, and the regiment ordered back to England within the next two years. Another change was during the Gulf War, all three batteries, A, B, and E amalgamated to form A/B/E Bty for Gulf service. On returning from the gulf in April 1991, the batteries were separated into their independent identities again. In September 1992, the regiment moved to Assaye Barracks, Tidworth, renamed as 1st Regiment Royal Horse Artillery and re-equipped with the L118 light gun in CRA, 3rd (United Kingdom) Mechanised Division in support of the 1st Mechanised Brigade.

=== Current history (1993–present) ===
In September 1993 the regiment was equipped with the new AS-90 and the observation parties equipped in the Warrior tracked armoured vehicle. In December of that year, L (Néry) Battery and O Battery (The Rocket Troop) joined the regiment after the disbandment of the 2nd Regiment Royal Artillery, and O Bty became O Headquarters Battery (The Rocket Troop) of the regiment. The regiment now controlled the following batteries after the recent reforms; A Battery (The Chestnut Troop), B Battery, E Battery, and L (Néry) Battery as field batteries, and O Headquarters Battery (The Rocket Troop). In April 1994 the regiment's radar troop deployed to Bosnia and the regiment then joined and deployed many times until 2002.

In November 1999 after the recent Strategic Defence Review 1998, N Battery (The Eagle Troop) joined from 3rd Regiment Royal Horse Artillery and amalgamated with L (Néry) Battery to form L/N (Néry) Battery (The Eagle Troop).

In 2004, 1 RHA deployed to Basra, Iraq on Operation Telic (Op TELIC 4) as part of 1st Mechanised Brigade: Sergeant Terry Bryan from 1RHA was awarded the Conspicuous Gallantry Cross for his actions during an incident on 9 August 2004. On 28 September 2004, a convoy of 1 RHA vehicles was ambushed, resulting in the loss of Cpl Marc Taylor REME and Gunner David Lawrence in an improvised explosive device attack. In 2007, 1 RHA re-deployed to Basra, Iraq on Operation Telic (Operation TELIC 10).

In September 2009 1 RHA deployed for approximately 7 months to Helmand province, Afghanistan on Operation HERRICK 11 supporting 11 Light Brigade. 1 RHA deployed to Afghanistan for a second time, on Operation Herrick 16, in 2013.

Under Army 2020, and its successor, Army 2020 Refine, the regiment is now part of the re-organised 1st Artillery Brigade and provides armoured artillery support to the 20th Armoured Infantry Brigade.

Under the Future Soldier Programme, the regiment will re-subordinate to the new 3rd Deep Reconnaissance Strike Brigade (a merger of 1st Armoured Infantry Brigade and 1st Artillery Brigade) in 2022. The regiment's role will remain the same, but will gain L (Nery) battery equipped with the General Dynamics Ajax as a "tactical group" charged with reconnaissance from 3rd Regiment, Royal Horse Artillery.

== Batteries ==
The batteries are as follows:

- Regimental Headquarters, at Assaye Barracks, Larkhill Garrison
- A Battery (The Chestnut Troop) Royal Horse Artillery – Archer
- B Battery Royal Horse Artillery – Archer
- E Battery Royal Horse Artillery – Archer
- L (Néry) Battery Royal Horse Artillery — Tactical Group Battery
- O Battery (The Rocket Troop) Royal Horse Artillery — Headquarters Battery
- V (Beane’s Troop) Battery — (as of 2026) Tactical Group Battery

== See also ==
- British Army
- Royal Artillery
- Royal Horse Artillery
- List of Royal Artillery batteries
