= 2nd Indian Cavalry Division =

Division of the British Indian Army during World War I

- Active: September 1914 – March 1918
- Country: British India
- Allegiance: British Crown
- Branch: British Indian Army
- Type: Cavalry
- Size: Division
- Part of: Indian Cavalry Corps
- Engagements: Western Front in World War I Battle of the Somme Battle of Bazentin Ridge Battle of Flers-Courcelette Hindenburg Line Battle of Cambrai

Commanders
- Notable commanders: Henry Macandrew

The 2nd Indian Cavalry Division was a division of the British Indian Army formed at the outbreak of World War I. It served on the Western Front, being renamed as 5th Cavalry Division on 26 November 1916. In March 1918, the 5th Cavalry Division was broken up. The British and Canadian units remained in France and the Indian elements were sent to Egypt to help constitute 2nd Mounted Division.

== History ==
The division sailed for France from Bombay on 16 October 1914, under the command of Major-General G. A. Cookson. During the war the division would serve in the trenches as infantry. Due to the difference on troop levels, each cavalry brigade, once dismounted, formed a dismounted regiment. In March 1916 the 2nd Indian Cavalry Division was attached to the British Fourth Army. On 1 July 1916 the 9th (Secunderabad) Cavalry Brigade moved into a reserve position on the Somme, ready to exploit any breakthrough. The same brigade was sent up again on 14 July, to Montauban to support the attack on the Bazentin – Longueval ridge. At 17.30, the leading two regiments were ordered to advance between High Wood and Delville Wood. The British 7th Dragoon Guards and the Indian 20th Deccan Horse galloped forward to a position between the woods, but little could be achieved. At 03.30 on 15 July, they returned to Montauban, having suffered casualties of 74 men and 110 horses. Cavalry units were again brought forward on 15 September to support the attack on Flers-Courcelette, but were not drawn into the fighting and played no further part in the Battle of the Somme except as labour units in reserve. The high number of officer casualties suffered early on had an effect on its later performance. British officers that understood the language, customs, and psychology of their men could not be quickly replaced, and the alien environment of the Western Front had some effect on the soldiers. The 2nd Indian Cavalry Division was renamed the 5th Cavalry Division on 26 November 1916, and attached to the Fifth Army. In March 1918, the division was transferred to Egypt, its two British regular cavalry regiments (8th Hussars and 7th Dragoon Guards) remaining in France.

== Order of battle ==
5th (Mhow) Cavalry Brigade (left on 15 September 1915 for 1st Indian Cavalry Division)

- 6th (Inniskilling) Dragoons
- 2nd Lancers (Gardner's Horse)
- 38th King George's Own Central India Horse
- X Battery, Royal Horse Artillery

7th (Meerut) Cavalry Brigade (left in June 1916 for Mesopotamia)

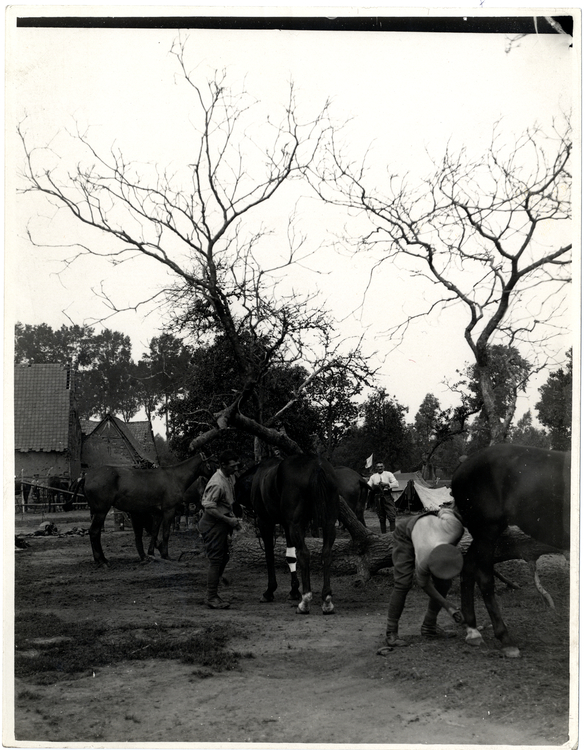
13th Hussars horselines and bivouacs Aire, France, 25 July 1915

- 13th Hussars
- 3rd Skinner's Horse
- 18th King George's Own Tiwana Lancers (transferred in June 1916 to 3rd (Ambala) Cavalry Brigade)
- 30th Lancers (Gordon's Horse) (joined in June 1916 from 3rd (Ambala) Cavalry Brigade)
- V Battery, Royal Horse Artillery
- 15th Machine Gun Squadron (joined in February 1916)

9th (Secunderabad) Cavalry Brigade

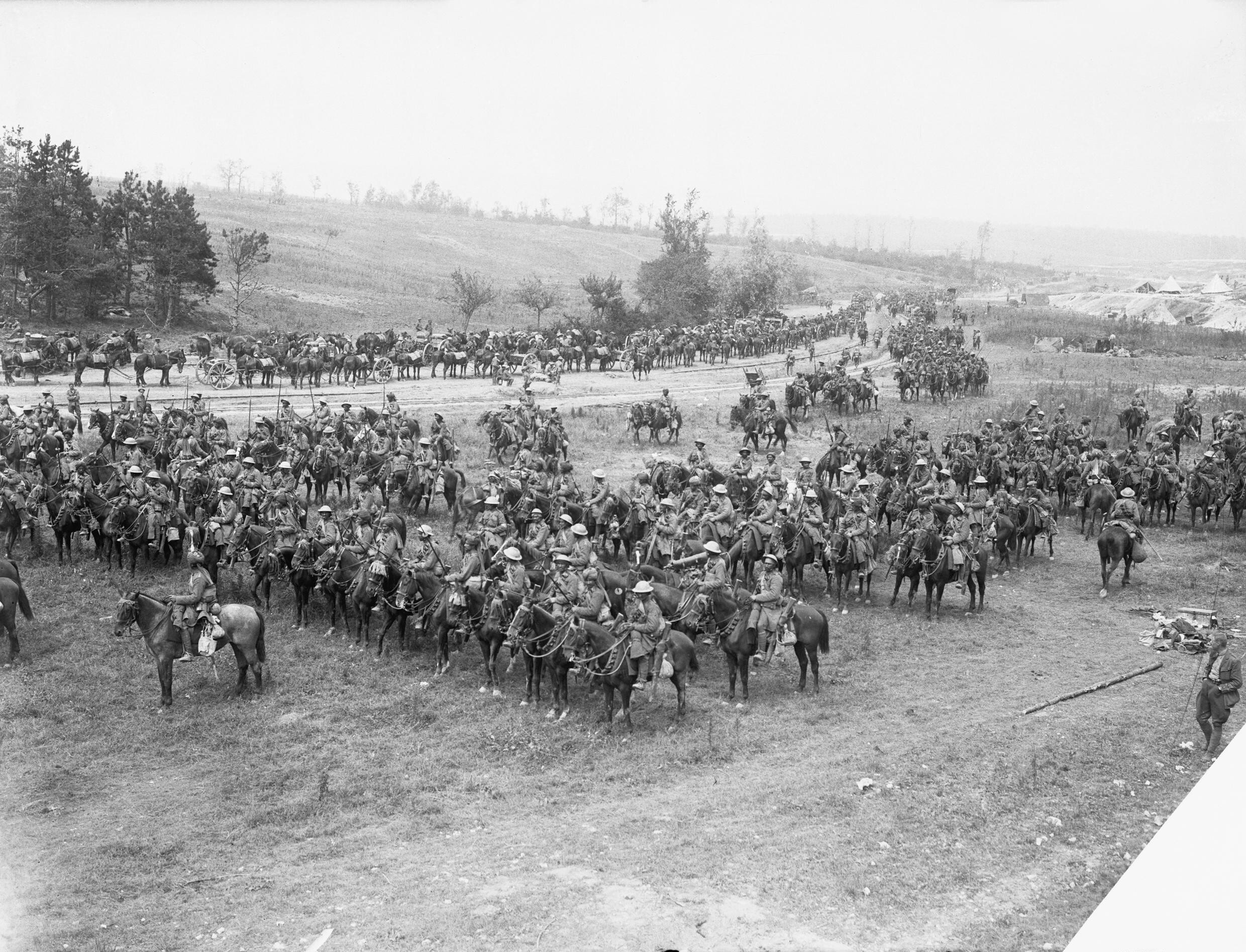
Battle of Bazentin Ridge, Battle of the Somme: the 20th Deccan Horse drawn up in ranks in the Carnoy Valley waiting for the opportunity to attack.

- 7th (Princess Royal's) Dragoon Guards
- 20th Deccan Horse
- 34th Prince Albert Victor's Own Poona Horse
- N Battery, Royal Horse Artillery
- 13th Machine Gun Squadron (joined on 29 February 1916)

3rd (Ambala) Cavalry Brigade (joined on 15 September 1915 from 1st Indian Cavalry Division)

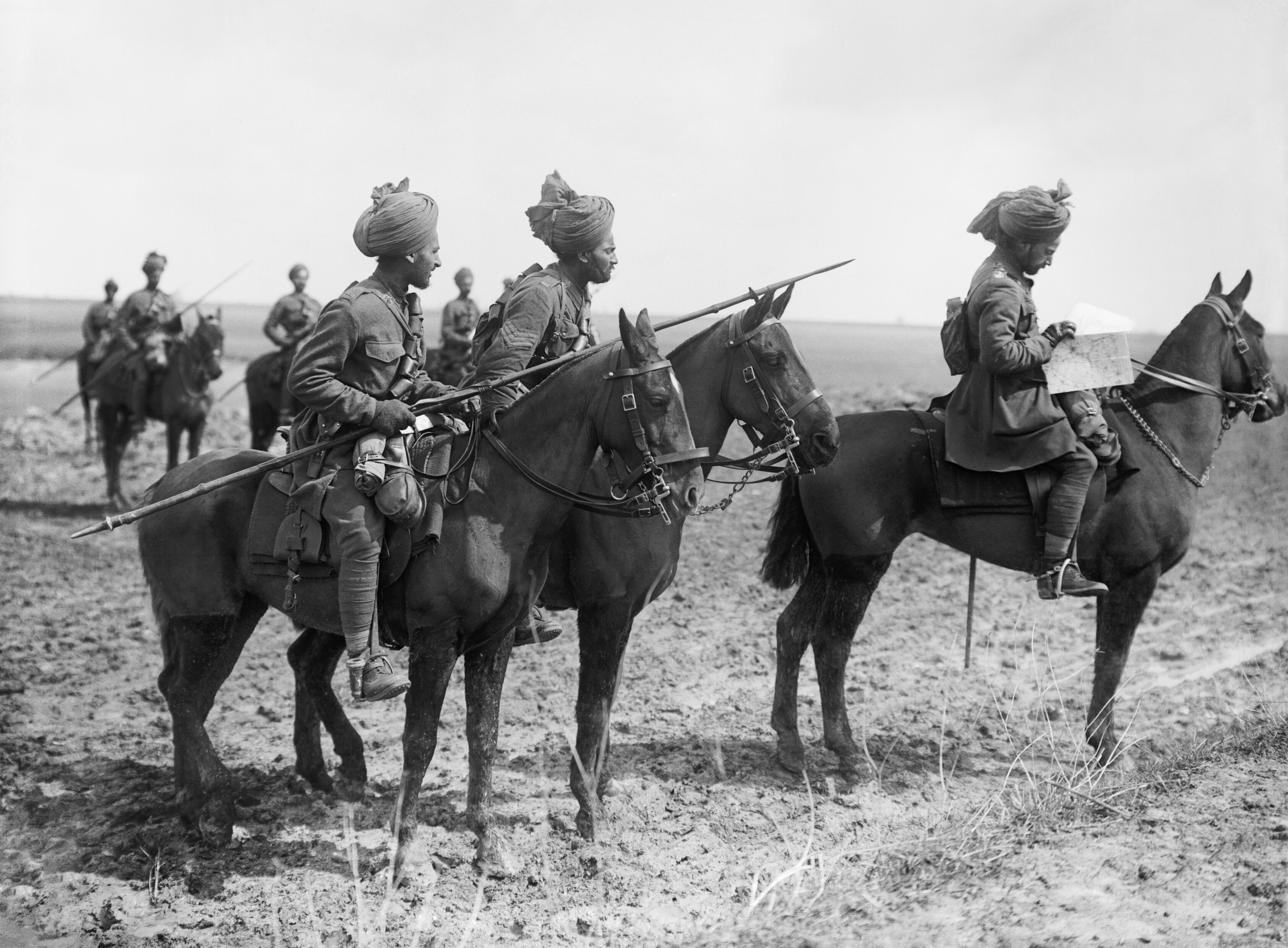
Forward scouts of the 9th Hodson's Horse pause to consult a map, near Vraignes, France in April 1917

- 8th (King's Royal Irish) Hussars
- 9th Hodson's Horse
- 30th Lancers (Gordon's Horse) (transferred in June 1916 to 7th (Meerut) Cavalry Brigade)
- 18th King George's Own Lancers (joined in June 1916 from 7th (Meerut) Cavalry Brigade)
- X Battery, Royal Horse Artillery
- 14th Machine Gun Squadron (joined on 29 February 1916)

Canadian Cavalry Brigade (joined on 17 June 1916 from 3rd Cavalry Division)

- Royal Canadian Dragoons
- Lord Strathcona's Horse
- Fort Garry Horse
- Royal Canadian Horse Artillery Brigade (A and B Batteries, RCHA)
- Canadian Cavalry Brigade Machine Gun Squadron

II Indian Brigade, Royal Horse Artillery (XVII Brigade, Royal Horse Artillery from 26 November 1916)

- N Battery, Royal Horse Artillery (with 9th (Secunderabad) Cavalry Brigade)
- X Battery, Royal Horse Artillery (with 7th (Meerut) Cavalry Brigade, to Mesopotamia with brigade)
- X Battery, Royal Horse Artillery (with 5th (Mhow) Cavalry Brigade then 3rd (Ambala) Cavalry Brigade)
- II Indian RHA Brigade Ammunition Column

== See also ==
- British cavalry during the First World War
- List of Indian divisions in World War I

== Bibliography ==
- Haythornthwaite, Philip J. (1996). The World War One Source Book. London: Arms and Armour Press. ISBN 1-85409-351-7.
- Perry, F.W. (1993). Order of Battle of Divisions Part 5B. Indian Army Divisions. Newport: Ray Westlake Military Books. ISBN 1-871167-23-X.
- Preston, R.M.P. (1921). The Desert Mounted Corps: An Account of the Cavalry Operations in Palestine and Syria 1917–1918. London: Constable & Co. OCLC 3900439.
- Sumner, Ian (2001). The Indian Army 1914–1947. Osprey Publishing. ISBN 1-84176-196-6.
- Wavell, Field Marshal Earl (1968) [1933]. "The Palestine Campaigns". In Sheppard, Eric William (ed.). A Short History of the British Army (4th ed.). London: Constable & Co. OCLC 35621223.
