= O Battery (The Rocket Troop) Royal Horse Artillery =

British Army artillery battery

- Active: 7 June 1813 – present
- Country: United Kingdom
- Branch: Army
- Type: Headquarters
- Part of: 1st Regiment Royal Horse Artillery
- Garrison/HQ: Larkhill
- Anniversaries: Leipzig Day 16 October
- Engagements: War of the Sixth Coalition: Battle of Leipzig; War of the Seventh Coalition: Battle of Waterloo; Crimean War; Second Anglo-Afghan War; Second Boer War; World War I World War II
- Battle honours: Ubique

Commanders
- Notable commanders: Richard Bogue; Edward Charles Whinyates

O Battery (The Rocket Troop) Royal Horse Artillery is the Headquarters Battery of the British Army's 1st Regiment Royal Horse Artillery. It is currently based in Purvis Lines in Larkhill Garrison.

== History ==
=== Formation ===
The battery was formed on 1 January 1813. In that year the battery fought as the only British Army unit present at the Battle of Leipzig as the Rocket Brigade under Captain Richard Bogue. It was attached to the bodyguard of Bernadotte, Crown Prince of Sweden. During the battle Bogue was killed in action after a successful attack on five French and Saxon battalions at Paunsdorf, and Lieutenant Fox-Strangways assumed command. In 1815, the battery fought with some of its rockets at the Battle of Waterloo, under Captain Edward Charles Whinyates. It served in the Crimean War, Second Anglo-Afghan War and the Second Boer War.

=== World War I ===
During World War I the battery supported the charge by the Royal Horse Guards at Villeselve in March 1918.

=== World War II ===
During World War II the battery served with 6th Regiment, Royal Horse Artillery.

=== Post war ===
The battery transferred to 2nd Regiment, Royal Horse Artillery in 1951 which re-roled to become 2nd Field Regiment Royal Artillery in 1958. In the 1970s, the battery completed tours in Northern Ireland. In 1993 it transferred to 1st Regiment Royal Horse Artillery and, in 1996, the battery was deployed to Bosnia. In 2004, B Battery deployed with 1 RHA to Basra in Iraq on Operation Telic 4 and in 2007 the battery deployed with 1st Regiment Royal Horse Artillery to Basra in Iraq on Operation Telic 10.

== See also ==
- British Army
- Royal Artillery
- Royal Horse Artillery
- List of Royal Artillery Batteries

== Bibliography ==
- Clarke, W.G. (1993). Horse Gunners: The Royal Horse Artillery, 200 Years of Panache and Professionalism. Woolwich: The Royal Artillery Institution. ISBN 09520762-0-9.
