= St John's Wood Barracks =

- St John's Wood, London
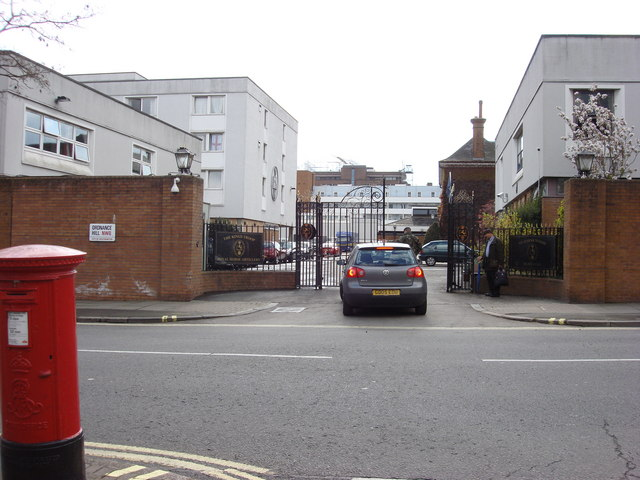
- The former Barracks in St John's Wood

Location
- Location within London
- Coordinates: 51.53640°N 0.17367°W

Site history
- Built: 1804

St John's Wood Barracks is a former military base in St John's Wood in London. Until 2012 it served as headquarters for Royal Horse Artillery troops responsible for (among other things) firing royal salutes in central London.

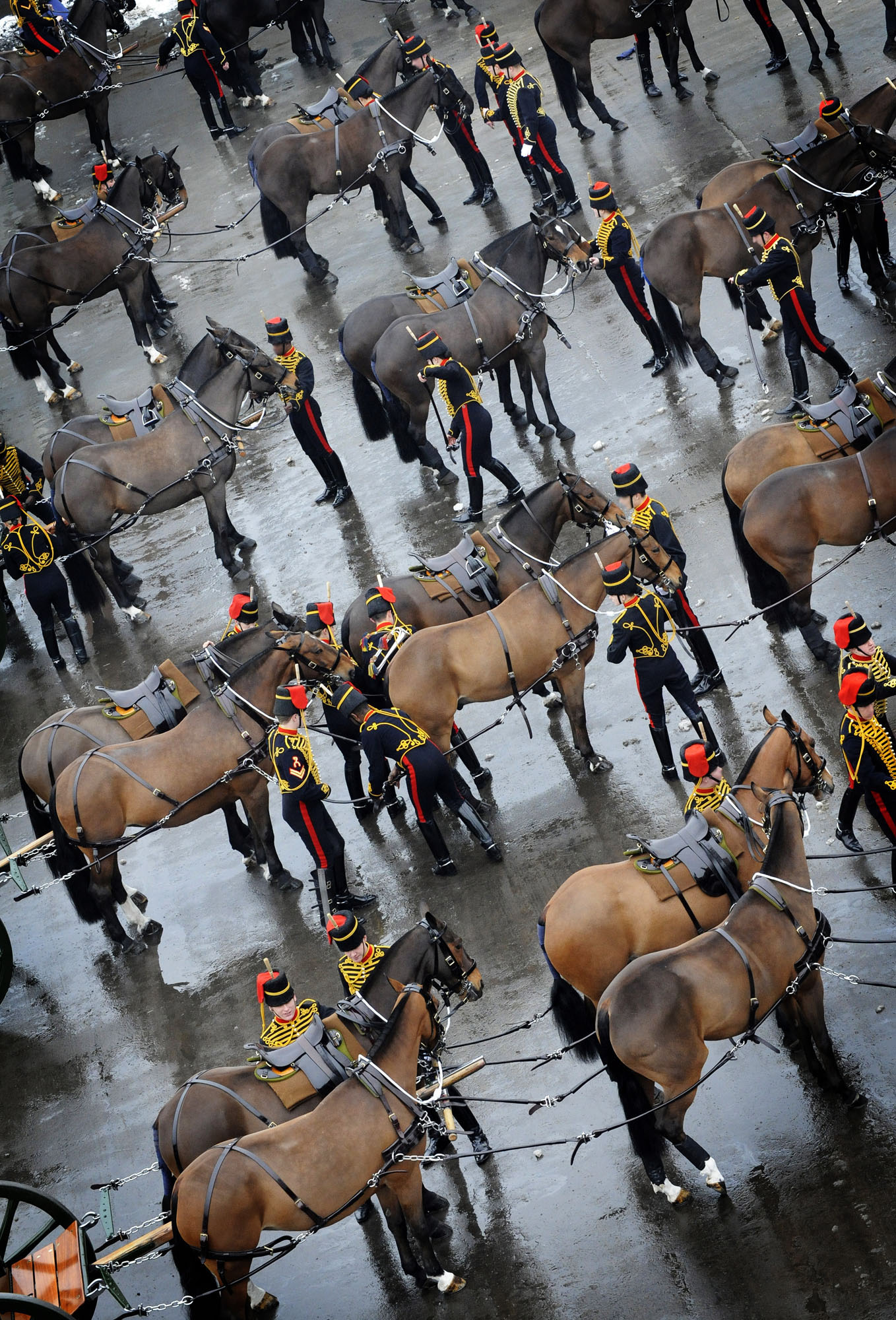
The King's Troop Royal Horse Artillery form up for their final parade at St John's Wood

== History ==
In 1804 a detachment of the Corps of Gunner Drivers (support unit for an artillery brigade stationed in St James's Park) was billeted in farm buildings on the St John's Wood site. By 1810 the Board of Ordnance had decided to base the brigade in its entirety on the site, and negotiated a lease from the Eyre family who owned the land. A long two-storey barrack block designated the New Artillery Barracks was completed in 1812. In 1823 the Cavalry Riding Establishment moved in and a new riding school was built for them by the Royal Engineers in 1825; they moved out to Maidstone in 1835.

During the mid 19th century the barracks were occupied by the Foot Guards. In 1880 the Royal Horse Artillery moved in and continuously occupied the barracks until February 2012 when (the lease on the property having expired) the King's Troop, Royal Horse Artillery relocated to the Royal Artillery Barracks, Woolwich.

In November 2011, Malaysian Ananda Krishnan, one of the richest businessmen in Asia, acquired the Barracks from the Eyre estate for £250m with a view to creating a prime residential development of 133 homes. The Grade II listed Riding School of 1825 was to be preserved, and there was a plan to accommodate a gym for residents' and community use.

Work began on the project in October 2022 with an anticipated completion date of 2028. The old barracks buildings were demolished by June 2023 with the exception of the former Riding School. In August 2023 Westminster City Council formally approved the name "St John's Wood Square" to refer to the site of the new development.
