= T Battery (Shah Sujah's Troop) Royal Artillery =

British Army artillery battery

Shah Sujah's Troop T Battery Royal Horse Artillery T Battery (Shah Sujah's Troop) Royal Artillery
- Active: 13 September 1838 – present
- Country: United Kingdom
- Allegiance: Hon East India Coy (till 1858); United Kingdom (post 1858)
- Branch: British Indian Army; British Army
- Type: Artillery
- Role: Anti-aircraft
- Size: Battery
- Part of: 12th Regiment Royal Artillery
- Garrison/HQ: Baker Barracks, Thorney Island, West Sussex
- Anniversaries: Battery Day 8 May
- Equipment: SP HVM (Starstreak mounted on Stormer)
- Engagements: First Anglo-Afghan War; First Anglo-Sikh War; Second Boer War; First World War; Second World War; Falklands War; Gulf War
- Battle honours: Ubique

Commanders
- Notable commanders: George Renny VC

T Battery (Shah Sujah's Troop) Royal Artillery is an air defence battery of the Royal Artillery that serves with the British Army's 12 Regiment Royal Artillery. It is stationed at Baker Barracks, Thorney Island, West Sussex.

Formed 1838 as Shah Sujah's Troop, it was part of Shah Sujah's force that attempted to restore him to power in Afghanistan. After the assassination of Shah Sujah in 1842, the battery was transferred to the Bengal Army of the Honourable East India Company.

It remained loyal during the Indian Rebellion of 1857 and took part in the Siege of Delhi where its commander, George Renny, won the Victoria Cross. In the aftermath, it was transferred to the British Army's Royal Horse Artillery (RHA), eventually becoming T Battery Royal Horse Artillery. It took part in the Second Boer War and the First World War (Western Front and in Italy).

The post-war reductions in the RHA saw the battery revert to the Royal Artillery in 1920. In 1926 it was officially granted its Honour Title "Shah Sujah's Troop". It then took part in the Second World War (Middle East and Italy again).

Since the Second World War, it has seen a wide variety of service as anti-tank and anti-aircraft gunners, as a towed and self-propelled anti-aircraft missile battery and as a Headquarters unit. It has spent much of that time in Germany as part of the BAOR, but also served in Northern Ireland (Operation Banner) and took part in the Falklands War and the Gulf War. The Bty disbanded on the 31/10/1991 with the bulk of the members of the Battery going to 9 Plassey Bty and forming Friday troop. Temporarily reroled to Javelin prior to being the first Troop to convert to the new weapon system HVM starstreak mounted on the Stormer AFV. The Battle honours and name of the Bty then went to the Regts HQ Bty thus then being called T HQ Bty (Shah Sujah's Troop) RA. The Army 2020 restructuring saw the Battery relinquish its role as a headquarters battery in 2015 and return to being Self Propelled Air Defence Battery Equipped with the HVM Stormer system. 170 (Imjin) Battery RA has been reformed to take on T Batterys previous role as Headquarters Battery.

== History ==
=== Early history ===
The battery was formed on 13 September 1838 as Shah Sujah's Troop, Horse Artillery at Delhi and Meerut. It was raised as part of Shah Sujah's force of 6,000 troops which invaded Afghanistan in an attempt to restore him to power. Equipped with ten 6 pounder guns and two 12 pounder howitzers, it was twice the normal strength of a battery. It was commanded by Captain William Anderson of the Bengal Artillery.

For two years, from the winter of 1839, it served at Kandahar. After the assassination of Shah Sujah in 1842, the battery was withdrawn to Ferozepore. It was transferred to the Bengal Army of the Honourable East India Company and became the 5th (Native) (Note: "Native" units of the Honourable East India Company's armies were manned predominantly by Indian soldiers (sepoys) as opposed to "European" units which recruited white soldiers.) Troop, 1st Brigade, Bengal Horse Artillery on 23 December 1842. It served in the First Anglo-Sikh War and on frontier expeditions.

=== Indian Mutiny ===
By the time the Indian Rebellion of 1857 broke out, the Bengal Horse Artillery had grown to 13 batteries, organized as three brigades. Four of these batteries were manned by sepoys (native Indian soldiers) and two mutinied: 4th Troop, 1st Brigade at Neemuch and 4th Troop, 3rd Brigade at Multan. Shah Sujah's Troop remained loyal and it took part in the Siege of Delhi where its commander, George Renny, won the Victoria Cross. All four Native Bengal batteries were promptly reformed as European units.

As a result of the Rebellion, the British Crown took direct control of India from the East India Company on 1 November 1858 under the provisions of the Government of India Act 1858. The Presidency armies transferred to the direct authority of the British Crown and its European units were transferred to the British Army. Henceforth artillery, the mutineers most effective arm, was to be the sole preserve of the British Army (with the exception of certain Mountain Artillery batteries). On 19 February 1862, the Bengal Horse Artillery transferred to the Royal Artillery as its 2nd and 5th Horse Brigades. (Note: The original Horse Brigade Royal Artillery formed 1st Horse Brigade RA, the 1st Brigade Bengal Horse Artillery became 2nd Horse Brigade RA, the Madras Horse Artillery became 3rd Horse Brigade RA, the Bombay Horse Artillery became 4th Horse Brigade RA and the 2nd Brigade Bengal Horse Artillery became 5th Horse Brigade RA. The 3rd Brigade Bengal Horse Artillery was split between 2nd and 5th Horse Brigades RA. These brigades performed an administrative, rather than tactical, role.) On transfer, Shah Sujah's Troop became E Battery, 2nd Horse Brigade (E/2 in short) at Allahabad.

=== Late Victorian era ===
A reorganization of the horse artillery on 13 April 1864 saw 2nd Brigade became C Brigade. (Note: The 1st Brigade with 10 batteries was much larger than the other four (with four to seven batteries each) so was split as A and B Brigades, 2nd Brigade become C Brigade, 3rd become D Brigade, 4th become E Brigade, and 5th become F Brigade.) As battery designations were tied to the brigade the battery was assigned to, the batteries were also redesignated and it became F/C Battery at Lucknow. This was the first in a bewildering series of redesignations.

From 1866, the term "Royal Horse Artillery" appeared in Army List hence the battery was designated F/C Battery, Royal Horse Artillery from about this time. Further reoganisations saw the number of brigades reduced to three (of 10 batteries each) then two (of 13 batteries each) and consequently lead to the redesignation of the battery as F/D (16 January 1873), C/E (1 April 1875), C/C (1 July 1877), and N/B (28 March 1882).

The brigade system was finally abolished on 1 July 1889. Henceforth, batteries were designated in a single alphabetical sequence in order of seniority from date of formation. The battery took on it final designation as T Battery, Royal Horse Artillery.

Equipped with six 12 pounders, the battery was sent to South Africa with the 1st Cavalry Brigade (Note: Of the 10 RHA batteries that took part in the Second Boer War: A, J and M Batteries were unbrigaded; Q, T and U Batteries were assigned to 1st Cavalry Brigade; G and P Batteries were assigned to 2nd Cavalry Brigade; O and R Batteries were assigned to 3rd Cavalry Brigade) and saw active service in the Second Boer War, notably at the Battle of Paardeberg (27 February 1900).

=== First World War ===
On 1 March 1901, a new brigade (Note: The basic organic unit of the Royal Artillery was, and is, the Battery. When grouped together they formed brigades, in the same way that infantry battalions or cavalry regiments were grouped together in brigades. At the outbreak of World War I, a field artillery brigade of headquarters (4 officers, 37 other ranks), three batteries (5 and 193 each), and a brigade ammunition column (4 and 154) had a total strength just under 800 so was broadly comparable to an infantry battalion (just over 1,000) or a cavalry regiment (about 550). Like an infantry battalion, an artillery brigade was usually commanded by a Lieutenant-Colonel. Artillery brigades were redesignated as regiments in 1938.) system was introduced, this time as a tactical, rather than administrative, formation. The battery was assigned to XIII Brigade-Division, RHA along with U Battery. In 1903 this was redesignated as XIII Brigade, RHA and was stationed in South Africa with the battery at Krugersdorp. By 1905 it was in India and it took part in the Rawalpindi Parade. On 1 October 1906, the brigade was redesignated as XI Brigade, RHA.

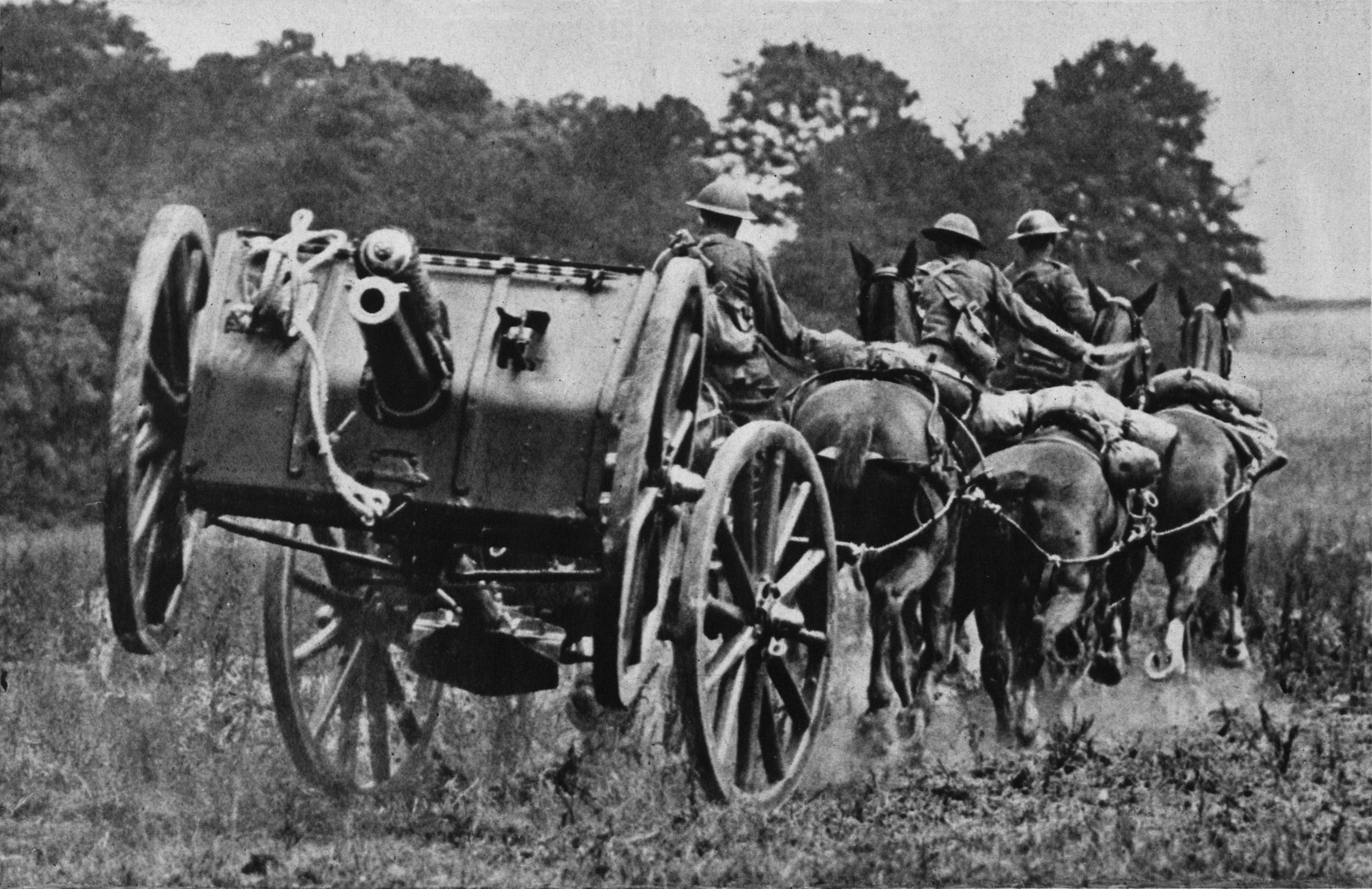
Photo showing 13 pounder gun team galloping into action.

By the time the First World War broke out, the battery had been re-equipped with six quick-firing 13 pounders. It was still assigned to XI Brigade (though U Battery was at Lucknow in India) and was stationed at Abbassia, Cairo serving in the Force in Egypt. It returned to Europe and joined XIV Brigade, 7th Division on the Western Front on 21 December 1914.

It served with the division on the Western Front until February 1917. It missed the actions in 1914, but saw considerable action serving in the battles of Neuve Chapelle (10 – 13 March 1915), Aubers Ridge (9 May), Festubert (15 – 19 May), and Givenchy (15 and 16 June). On 19 June, the battery replaced its 13 pounders with six 18 pounders. It then took part in the Battle of Loos (25 September – 8 October 1915), the Somme (1 – 20 July and 3 – 7 September 1916) and the Operations on the Ancre (11 – 15 January 1917).

On 10 February 1917, the battery and brigade left 7th Division and became XIV Army Brigade, RHA. (Note: Army Brigades, RHA and RFA were artillery brigades that were excess to the needs of the divisions, withdrawn to form an artillery reserve.) It moved to the Italian Front in December 1917, before returning to the Western Front in March 1918. At the Armistice, it was serving as Army Troops with the Third Army still armed six 18 pounders.

=== Inter-war period ===
Post-war plans for the RHA envisioned that it would have 27 batteries in nine brigades. XIV Brigade was disbanded in Germany in May 1919 and in June the battery returned to the United Kingdom and was stationed at Aldershot and Newbridge. Clarke states that the battery was assigned to IX Brigade, RHA which was based at Trowbridge with N, S and U Batteries but that it probably did not join the other batteries at Trowbridge as the brigade was broken up very soon after being organized. In contrast, Frederick says it joined IV Brigade, RHA which was at Newbridge and Kilkenny with I and L Batteries.

In either case, the new organisation was short-lived as the usual post-war reductions took their toll and the Royal Horse Artillery was reduced to five brigades and 15 batteries. Consequently, on 4 May 1920, T Battery was redesignated as 146th Battery, RFA and joined 1st Brigade Royal Field Artillery. Between 1922 and 1924 it served with the brigade at the Royal School of Artillery at Larkhill. On 1 November 1922 it was redesignated as 111th Battery, RFA before resuming its original designation as T Battery, Royal Field Artillery on 1 March 1924 when it transferred to 15th Brigade Royal Field Artillery. As the Royal Field Artillery was reamalgamated into the Royal Artillery, it became T Battery, Royal Artillery on 1 May 1924.

In commemoration of its origins, the Honour Title "Shah Sujah's Troop" was officially granted to the battery on 13 October 1926.

With effect from May 1938, brigades were redesignated as regiments and 15th Brigade became 15th Field Regiment, RA. T Battery was still with the regiment on the outbreak of the Second World War with R, S and U Batteries and was stationed at Lahore, India.

=== Second World War ===
The battery served with 15th Field Regiment throughout the Second World War. In November 1940 they moved from Lahore to Rawalpindi.

From 1938, field artillery brigades had been reorganized from three or four six-gun batteries to two 12-gun batteries. Rather than disband existing batteries, they were instead linked in pairs. Strangely, this did not happen in 15th Field Regiment until 12 November 1940 (after arrival in Rawalpindi) when T Battery was linked with R Battery as R/T Battery (and S and U batteries were linked as S/U Battery). The experience of the BEF in May 1940 had already shown the limitations of having artillery regiments formed with two 12-gun batteries: field regiments were intended to support an infantry brigade of three battalions (or armoured brigade of three regiments). This could not be managed without severe disruption to the regiment. As a result, field regiments were reorganised into three 8-gun batteries but this did not happen in 15th Field Regiment until November 1942.

On 27 June 1941 it departed India and arrived in Iraq on 3 July where it was assigned to the 2nd Indian Armoured Brigade Group. It went with the brigade to Persia in August and returned to Iraq in October. It was at Quayarrah (or Qaiyara) on 31 January 1942 and Mosul on 31 March. It was unlinked from R Battery at Sheraiba (or Shuabia) on 9 November and was once again T Battery, RA. 2nd Indian Armoured Brigade (by now renumbered as 252nd Indian Armoured Brigade) came under the command of 31st Indian Armoured Division and the regiment came under the direct command of the division on 1 August 1942. It left the division and Iraq on 1 September 1943 when it was transferred to Egypt, arriving on 11 September. On 21 October, 31st Indian Armoured Division also arrived in Egypt and the regiment rejoined the division. The division was preparing to take part in the Italian Campaign; however more armoured formations were not needed in Italy and division remained in Egypt, Syria and Lebanon.

On 15 November 1943, the regiment left the Indian establishment and was assigned to the 7th AGRA (Army Group Royal Artillery). By January 1944, the regiment had been equipped with Sexton 25 pounder self-propelled guns. In July 1944, it moved to Italy where it served with the British 8th Army and U.S. 5th Army. 15th Field Regiment ended the war in Italy as a self-propelled artillery regiment.

=== Post-war ===
Plans were put in place at the end of 1946 to create a total of eight RHA regiments to form the artillery element of the 6th and 7th Armoured Divisions in the British Army of the Rhine. 7th Regiment, RHA was to be an Anti-Tank Regiment with R, S, T and U Batteries. T Battery became RHA on 15 November 1946. Initially formed in the BAOR in October 1946, the decision was rescinded in March 1947 before the regiment was fully constituted. On 1 April 1947, the regiment became 12th Anti-Tank Regiment, Royal Artillery and the battery reverted to Royal Artillery. It has remained with 12th Regiment ever since.

Equipped with 17 pounder anti-tank guns, it was initially based in Palestine from May 1947 before returning to England (Woolwich) briefly in 1948. It then moved to Libya and on to Trieste in June 1950. In February 1951, it moved to Germany for the first time and joined the BAOR at Celle.

On arrival in Germany, 12th Regiment was converted to the anti-aircraft role as part of 6th Armoured Division and the battery was re-equipped with Bofors guns (initially with the L/60 variant, later L/70). It spent most of the 1950s and 1960s in Germany, though from 1963 to 1966 it was at Tampin, Malaya (at the time of the confrontation). From 25 Nov 1971 to 17 Mar 1972 it undertook the first of nine roulement tours to Northern Ireland (Operation Banner) in the infantry role, either with 12th Regiment or separately.

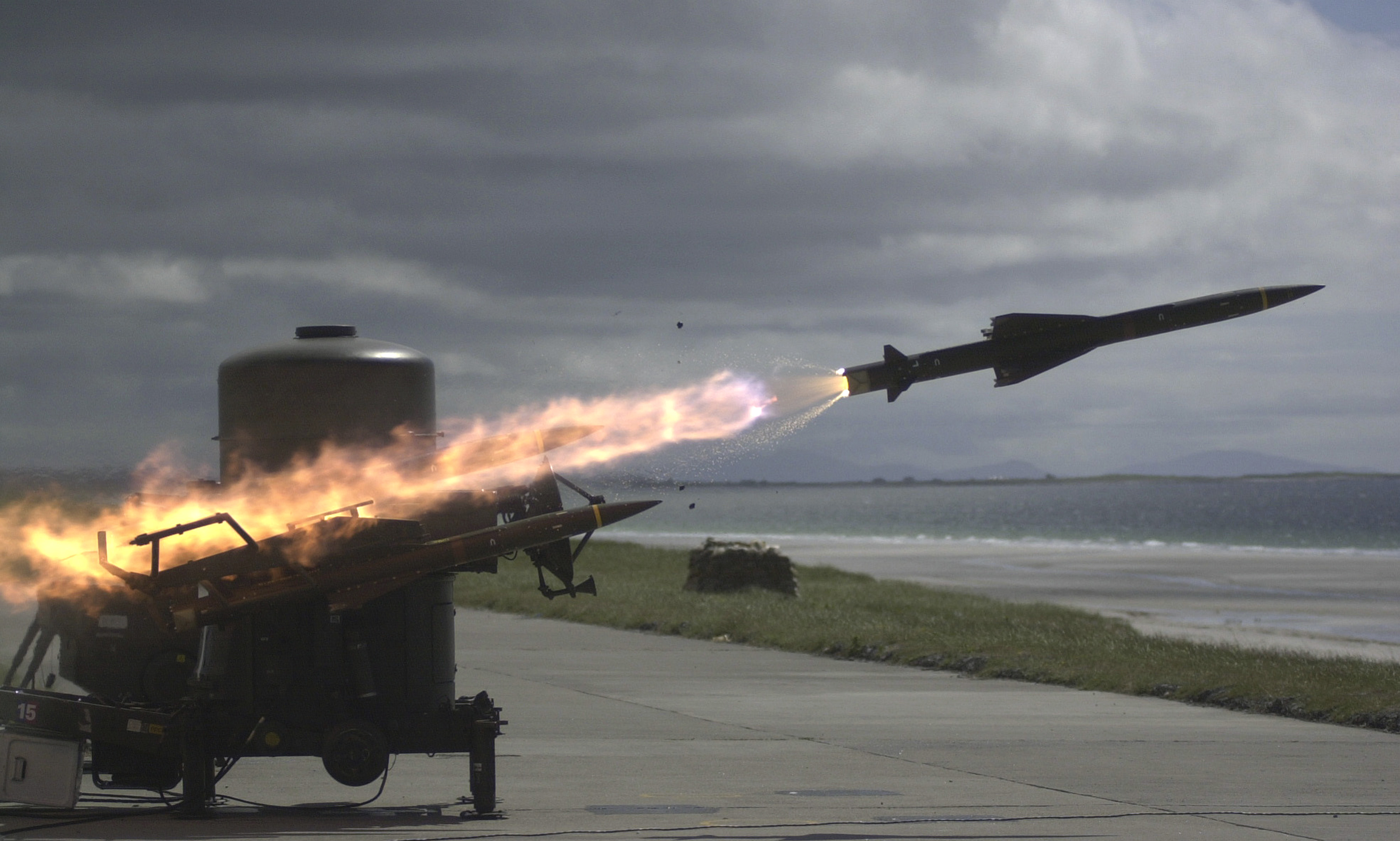
A Rapier missile speeds towards its target during a live firing exercise.

It moved to Rapier Barracks, Kirton-in-Lindsay in August 1972. From July 1973, 9 (Plassey) Battery of the regiment began trials with the Rapier anti-aircraft missile and by September 1975 the regiment was back in Germany fully equipped with the new system. It returned to Rapier Barracks in May 1981 and was there when the Falklands War broke out. T Battery was dispatched to the South Atlantic to take part in the conflict. It was back in Germany in January 1985, by now equipped with Tracked Rapier. From there, it deployed to the Gulf in January 1991 to take part in the Gulf War. The Bty disbanded on the 31/10/1991 with the bulk of the members of the Battery going to 9 Plassey Bty and forming F troop. Temporarily reroled to Javelin prior to being the first Troop to convert to the new weapon system HVM starstreak mounted on the Stormer AFV. The Battle honours and name of the Bty then went to the Regts HQ Bty thus then being called THQ Bty Shah Sujah's Troop RA. In April 1993, T Battery rerolled as the Headquarters battery of 12th Regiment. It undertook a tour to Cyprus as part of UNFICYP (December 1995 to June 1996) and to Kosovo in 1999. It returned to England in 2009 and has been based at Baker Barracks, Thorney Island, West Sussex since then.

=== Current status ===
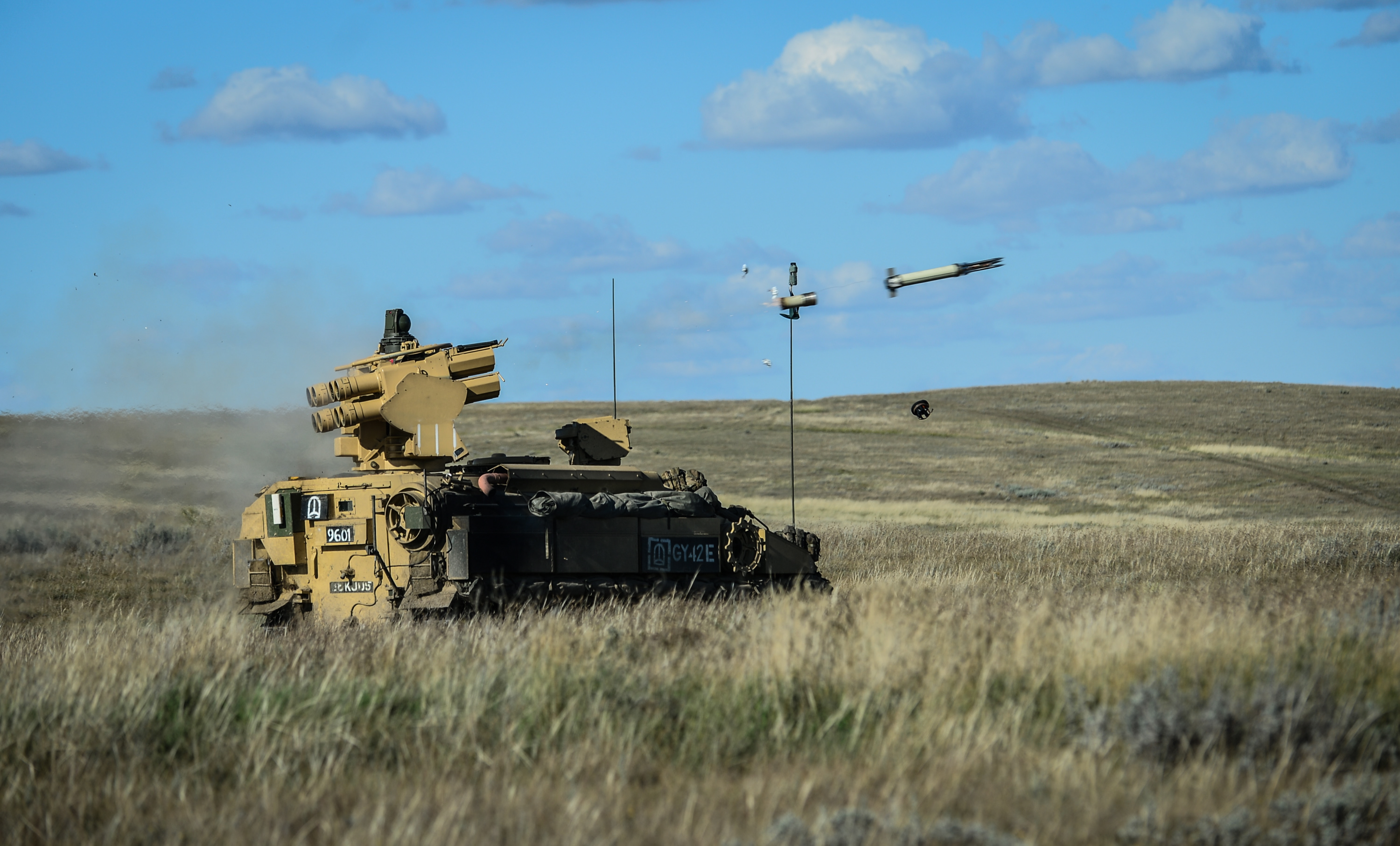
Stormer firing a Starstreak anti-aircraft missile.

Under Army 2020 plans, 12th Regiment was reorganized. The battery relinquished its headquarters role to 170 (Imjin) Battery and was rerolled as a self-propelled air defence battery. It is equipped with Starstreak Surface-to-air missiles mounted on Stormer armoured vehicles.

== See also ==
- British Army
- Royal Artillery
- Royal Horse Artillery
- List of Royal Artillery Batteries

== Bibliography ==
- Becke, Archibald F. (1935). Order of Battle of Divisions Part 1–The Regular British Divisions. London: HMSO. OCLC 4405016.
- Clarke, W.G. (1993). Horse Gunners: The Royal Horse Artillery, 200 Years of Panache and Professionalism. Woolwich: The Royal Artillery Institution. ISBN 09520762-0-9.
- Forty, George (1998). British Army Handbook 1939–1945. Stroud, Gloucestershire: Sutton Publishing Limited. ISBN 0-7509-1403-3.
- Frederick, J.B.M. (1984). Lineage Book of British Land Forces 1660–1978. Wakefield, Yorkshire: Microform Academic Publishers. ISBN 1-85117-009-X.
- Joslen, Lt-Col H.F. (1990) [1st. Pub. HMSO:1960]. Orders of Battle, Second World War, 1939–1945. London: London Stamp Exchange. ISBN 0-948130-03-2.
- Kempton, Chris (2003a). 'Loyalty & Honour', The Indian Army September 1939 – August 1947. Vol. Part I Divisions. Milton Keynes: The Military Press. ISBN 0-85420-228-5.
- Kempton, Chris (2003b). 'Loyalty & Honour', The Indian Army September 1939 – August 1947. Vol. Part II Brigades. Milton Keynes: The Military Press. ISBN 0-85420-238-2.
- Order of Battle of the British Armies in France, November 11th, 1918. France: General Staff, GHQ. 1918.
