= M Battery Royal Horse Artillery =

British Army artillery battery

- Active: 23 January 1809 – present
- Country: United Kingdom
- Allegiance: Hon East India Coy (till 1858); United Kingdom (post 1858)
- Branch: British Army
- Type: Artillery
- Role: Headquarters
- Size: Battery
- Part of: 3rd Regiment Royal Horse Artillery
- Garrison/HQ: Albemarle Barracks, Northumberland, England
- Engagements: Anglo-Egyptian War; Second Boer War; Third Anglo-Afghan War; Second World War Western Desert Campaign Tunisia Campaign Italian Campaign North West Europe Campaign
- Battle honours: Ubique

M (Headquarters) Battery Royal Horse Artillery was the Headquarters Battery of 3rd Regiment Royal Horse Artillery, part of the Royal Horse Artillery of the British Army.

== History ==
=== Madras Horse Artillery ===
M Battery, Royal Horse Artillery was formed on 23 January 1809 as 2nd Troop, Madras Horse Artillery, a horse artillery battery of the Honourable East India Company's Madras Army. On 5 August 1825, it was redesignated as B Troop, 1st Brigade, Madras Horse Artillery as the Madras Horse Artillery expanded to 8 troops and was organized as two brigades. A reduction to 6 troops on 4 January 1831 resulted in the brigades being discontinued and the remaining troops lettered in a single sequence, hence becoming B Troop, Madras Horse Artillery.

As a result of the Indian Rebellion of 1857, the British Crown took direct control of India from the East India Company on 1 November 1858 under the provisions of the Government of India Act 1858. The Presidency armies transferred to the direct authority of the British Crown and its European units were transferred to the British Army. Henceforth artillery, the mutineers' most effective arm, was to be the sole preserve of the British Army (with the exception of certain Mountain Artillery batteries). On 19 February 1862, the Madras Horse Artillery transferred to the Royal Artillery as its 3rd Horse Artillery Brigade (Note: The original Horse Brigade Royal Artillery formed 1st Horse Brigade RA, the 1st Brigade Bengal Horse Artillery became 2nd Horse Brigade RA, the Madras Horse Artillery became 3rd Horse Brigade RA, the Bombay Horse Artillery became 4th Horse Brigade RA and the 2nd Brigade Bengal Horse Artillery became 5th Horse Brigade RA. The 3rd Brigade Bengal Horse Artillery was split between 2nd and 5th Horse Brigades RA. These brigades performed an administrative, rather than tactical, role.) and B Troop became B Battery, 3rd Horse Brigade, RA.

=== Late Victorian era ===
The battery was stationed at Secunderabad from June 1862. A reorganization of the horse artillery on 13 April 1864 saw 3rd Brigade became D Brigade. (Note: The 1st Brigade with 10 batteries was much larger than the other four (with four to seven batteries each) so was split as A and B Brigades, 2nd Brigade become C Brigade, 3rd become D Brigade, 4th become E Brigade, and 5th become F Brigade.) As battery designations were tied to the brigade the battery was assigned to, the battery was now designated B Battery, D Brigade.

From 1866, the term "Royal Horse Artillery" appeared in Army List hence the battery was designated B Battery, D Brigade, Royal Horse Artillery from about this time. Another reorganization on 14 April 1877 saw the number of brigades reduced to three (of 10 batteries each) and D Brigade was broken up. Its batteries were transferred to B and C Brigades and redesignated again, hence the battery became G Battery, B Brigade. The number of brigades was further reduced to two (of 13 batteries each) in 1882 without effecting the designation of the battery. The battery took part in the Anglo-Egyptian War, notably the Battle of Tel el-Kebir in September 1882.

The brigade system was finally abolished on 1 July 1889. Henceforth, batteries were designated in a single alphabetical sequence in order of seniority from date of formation and the battery took on its final designation as M Battery, Royal Horse Artillery.

Equipped with six 12 pounders, the battery was sent to South Africa, unbrigaded, (Note: Of the 10 RHA batteries that took part in the Second Boer War: A, J and M Batteries were unbrigaded; Q, T and U Batteries were assigned to 1st Cavalry Brigade; G and P Batteries were assigned to 2nd Cavalry Brigade; O and R Batteries were assigned to 3rd Cavalry Brigade) and saw active service in the Second Boer War including the Relief of Mafeking.

=== Early 20th century ===
The brigade system was reintroduced on 1 March 1901, this time as tactical formations, and the battery was assigned to the XIV Brigade-Division, RHA (redesignated as VIII Brigade, RHA on 1 October 1906) along with Q Battery and was stationed at Woolwich.

By the time the First World War broke out, the battery had been re-equipped with six quick-firing 13 pounders and was stationed at Risalpur, India with the 1st (Peshawar) Division. On mobilization it was assigned to the 1st (Risalpur) Cavalry Brigade. It remained in India throughout the war, the only RHA battery to do so, (Note: Of the other eight RHA batteries in India in August 1914: A, Q and U Batteries formed I Indian Brigade RHA assigned to 1st Indian Cavalry Division and sent to the Western Front in 1914; N, V and X Batteries formed II Indian Brigade RHA assigned to 2nd Indian Cavalry Division and sent to the Western Front in 1914; S Battery served with 6th Indian Cavalry Brigade in Mesopotamia from February 1915; W Battery served with 11th Indian Cavalry Brigade in Mesopotamia from November 1917) seeing extensive service on the North-West Frontier. Between 1914 and 1917 it was reduced to four guns as it provided a section (Note: A Subsection consisted of a single gun and limber drawn by six horses (with three drivers), eight gunners (riding on the limber or mounted on their own horses), and an ammunition wagon also drawn by six horses (with three drivers). Two Subsections formed a Section and in a six gun battery these would be designated as Left, Centre and Right Sections.) as reinforcements for the Western Front. In May 1919, it mobilized with the 1st (Risalpur) Cavalry Brigade and took part in the Third Anglo-Afghan War.

=== Inter-war period ===
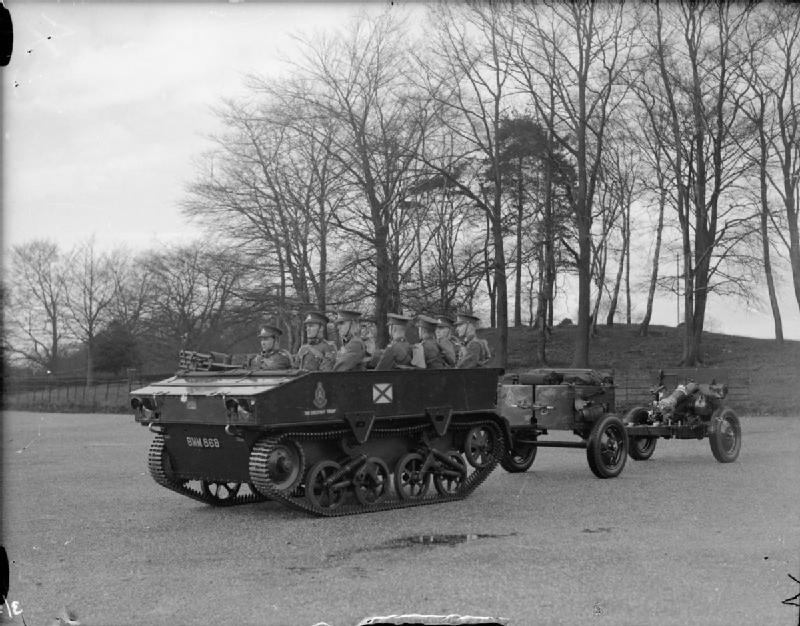
Light Dragon Mark II tractor towing a 3.7 inch howitzer on Carriage Mk IV and limber.

In the aftermath of the First World War, the Royal Horse Artillery was reorganized as it returned to pre-war levels and the battery was assigned to I Brigade, RHA. Further reductions saw the RHA shrink to five brigades (of three batteries each) by March 1920; VIII Brigade, RHA was absorbed in I Brigade and, in particular, M Battery absorbed AA Battery (Note: From 1 July 1889, RHA batteries were lettered in a single alphabetical sequence in order of seniority from date of formation. When more than 26 batteries were needed, double letters were used, AA, BB, etc.) on 4 January 1920 (the batteries were separated again on 11 May 1938).

By March 1920, the battery was overseas again, in Egypt. In October 1923 it returned to the United Kingdom and was stationed at Exeter. In November 1926 it moved to Aldershot where it was transferred to III Brigade, RHA. 1934 saw the start of mechanization; M and A Batteries were the first RHA batteries to be converted, replacing their horses and 13 pounders with 3.7" Howitzers towed by Light Dragon gun tractors. In September 1937 it moved back to Egypt with the brigade and was at Abbassia.

Two significant changes occurred in 1938. Firstly, artillery brigades were reorganized from three six-gun batteries to two 12-gun batteries. Rather than disband existing batteries, they were instead linked in pairs. As a result, M Battery was linked with P Battery to form M/P Battery on 11 May. The second change was that hereafter brigades were redesignated as regiments and III Brigade became 3rd Regiment Royal Horse Artillery on 27 August with D/J and M/P Batteries. In the event, the batteries were unlinked within months (in September 1939) and the regiment operated with four batteries (D, J, M and P).

=== Second World War ===
By the outbreak of the Second World War, 3rd Regiment, RHA was still in Egypt and on 16 October 1939 was assigned to Headquarters RA Group (Middle East Reserve). M Battery, however, was permanently attached to the Armoured Division (Egypt) (later the 7th Armoured Division, the "Desert Rats") in the anti-tank role armed with 2 pounder guns. The battery was to remain with the 7th Armoured Division for the rest of the war.

In January 1940, the 7th Support Group was formed for the division and the battery joined it on 22 January. The rest of 3rd RHA did not join the Support Group until 1 March 1941. In the meantime, the battery took part in the Western Desert Campaign: the Battle of Sidi Barrani (8 – 11 December 1940), the Battle of Bardia (3 – 5 January 1941), the Capture of Tobruk (21 and 22 January) and the Battle of Beda Fomm (5 – 8 February), and the whole regiment in Operation Crusader (18 November – 10 December) – notably the Battle of Sidi Rezegh.

The regiment left the 7th Support Group on 8 February 1942 (the day before it was reformed as the 7th Motor Brigade) and was assigned directly to the 7th Armoured Division.

It later took part in Operation Overlord.

=== Post war ===
In 1993, the battery was amalgamated with the HQ Battery of 3rd Regiment Royal Horse Artillery to become M (Headquarters) Battery.

== See also ==
- British Army
- Royal Artillery
- Royal Horse Artillery
- List of Royal Artillery Batteries
- Madras Horse Artillery Batteries

== Bibliography ==
- Clarke, W.G. (1993). Horse Gunners: The Royal Horse Artillery, 200 Years of Panache and Professionalism. Woolwich: The Royal Artillery Institution. ISBN 09520762-0-9.
- Frederick, J.B.M. (1984). Lineage Book of British Land Forces 1660–1978. Wakefield, Yorkshire: Microform Academic Publishers. ISBN 1-85117-009-X.
- Joslen, Lt-Col H.F. (1990) [1st. Pub. HMSO:1960]. Orders of Battle, Second World War, 1939–1945. London: London Stamp Exchange. ISBN 0-948130-03-2.
- Perry, F.W. (1993). Order of Battle of Divisions Part 5B. Indian Army Divisions. Newport, Gwent: Ray Westlake Military Books. ISBN 1-871167-23-X.
