= VII Brigade, Royal Horse Artillery =

Former horse artillery brigade of the British Army

VII Brigade, RHA 7th Regiment, RHA
- Active: 1 March 1901 – 1 March 1920; October 1946 – 1 May 1947
- Country: United Kingdom
- Branch: British Army
- Type: Artillery
- Size: Battalion
- Part of: 1st Cavalry Division
- Engagements: World War I Western Front

VII Brigade, Royal Horse Artillery was a brigade (Note: The basic organic unit of the Royal Artillery was, and is, the Battery. When grouped together they formed brigades, in the same way that infantry battalions or cavalry regiments were grouped together in brigades. At the outbreak of World War I, a field artillery brigade of headquarters (4 officers, 37 other ranks), three batteries (5 and 193 each), and a brigade ammunition column (4 and 154) had a total strength just under 800 so was broadly comparable to an infantry battalion (just over 1,000) or a cavalry regiment (about 550). Like an infantry battalion, an artillery brigade was usually commanded by a Lieutenant-Colonel. Artillery brigades were redesignated as regiments in 1938.) of the Royal Horse Artillery which existed in the early part of the 20th century. It served with 1st Cavalry Division throughout World War I and was reorganized post-war before being dissolved. A related unit 7th Regiment, RHA had a brief existence post-World War II, before 7th Parachute Regiment, RHA was formed in 1961.

== History ==
=== Formation ===
Royal Horse Artillery brigades did not exist as an organizational or operational grouping of batteries until 1 July 1859 when the Horse Brigade, Royal Artillery was formed. The brigade system was extended to five (later six) brigades when the horse artillery of the Honourable East India Company had been transferred to the British Army in 1861. These brigades were reduced to five in 1871, then to three (of 10 batteries each) in 1877 and to two (of 13 batteries each) in 1882. The brigade system was finally abolished in 1889.

As battery designations were tied to the brigade that the battery was assigned to, batteries were redesignated in a bewildering sequence as they were transferred between brigades. For example, E Battery of C Brigade (E/C Bty) might become N Battery of A Brigade (N/A Bty) upon transfer. Henceforth, batteries were designated in a single alphabetical sequence in order of seniority from date of formation.

The brigade system was revived in 1901. Each brigade now commanded just two batteries and a small staff (a lieutenant-colonel in command, an adjutant and a brigade sergeant major). Initially, batteries were not assigned to brigades in any particular order, but in 1906, at the insistence of Edward VII, brigades were redesignated so that batteries were roughly in order of seniority (hence I Brigade commanded A Battery and B Battery).

VII Brigade, RHA was formed on 1 March 1901 as the VIII Brigade-Division, RHA with I Battery and L Battery. In 1903 it was redesignated as VIII Brigade, RHA and was stationed at Secunderabad. On 1 October 1906, it was redesignated as VII Brigade, RHA.

=== World War I ===
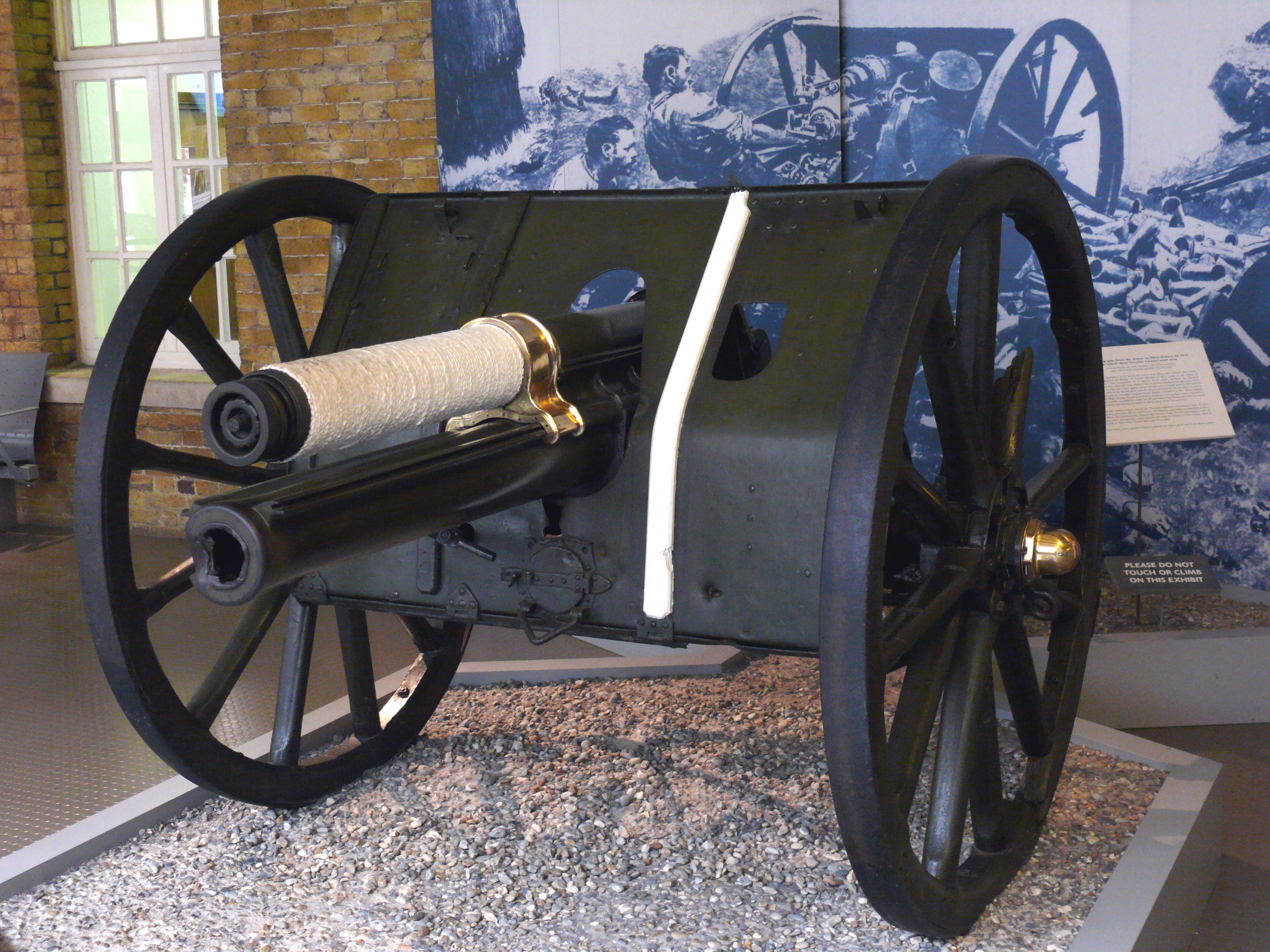
The "Néry Gun" at the Imperial War Museum.

At the outbreak of World War I, the brigade was at Aldershot attached to 1st Cavalry Brigade, still commanding I and L Batteries. On mobilization, it joined 1st Cavalry Division (along with III Brigade, RHA). The brigade served with the 1st Cavalry Division on the Western Front for the rest of the war and the brigade commander acted as Commander Royal Horse Artillery (CRHA) for the division. In practice, the batteries were permanently assigned to the cavalry brigades from September 1914 onwards.

The division crossed to France between 15 and 18 August 1914, concentrated around Maubeuge between 18 and 20 August, and moved forward towards Mons on 21 August. Its first action was the Battle of Mons on 23 and 24 August where the division formed the left flank. It took part in the subsequent retreat, notably the actions of Elouges and Solesmes, the Battle of Le Cateau, the action at Néry and the First Battle of the Marne, before advancing again to the First Battle of the Aisne and the Race to the Sea (Battle of Messines).

At Néry on 1 September, L Battery was almost destroyed as an operational unit: of five Officers, three were killed and two wounded; of 200 Other Ranks, 20 were killed and 29 wounded; and five of six 13 pounders were lost. It had to be withdrawn to England to reform. (Tempy) Z Battery, RHA was formed from various sections (Note: A Subsection consisted of a single gun and limber drawn by six horses (with three drivers), eight gunners (riding on the limber or mounted on their own horses), and an ammunition wagon also drawn by six horses (with three drivers). Two Subsections formed a Section and in a six gun battery these would be designated as Left, Centre and Right Sections.) of I, D and J Batteries, RHA to replace it. On 27 September, the sections returned to their batteries and (Tempy) Z Battery ceased to exist. The next day, H Battery, RHA joined from VI Brigade, RHA at Trowbridge and was attached to 2nd Cavalry Brigade. I Battery, RHA had been attached to 1st Cavalry Brigade on 17 September.

On 14 April 1915, the 9th Cavalry Brigade was formed and joined 1st Cavalry Division to bring it up to a three-brigade strength. 1/1st Warwickshire RHA (TF) joined from 2nd Cavalry Division on the same day and was attached to 9th Cavalry Brigade. The division took part in the Second Battle of Ypres (Battle of Frezenberg, 9–13 May, and Battle of Bellewaarde Ridge, 24 May).

The only action in 1916 was at the Battle of Flers-Courcelette (15 September) when the division was in reserve to XIV Corps of Fourth Army. On 21 November, 1/1st Warwickshire Battery, RHA (TF) was transferred to XV Brigade, RHA, 29th Division replacing Y Battery, RHA which joined VII Brigade, RHA (9th Cavalry Brigade) on 1 December.

In 1917, the brigade supported the division in a number of major actions including the Battle of Arras (April, First Battle of the Scarpe) and the Battle of Cambrai (November and December, including the Tank Attack, the Capture of Bourlon Wood and the German Counter-attacks).

1918 saw greater action as the war of movement resumed, including the German Operation Michael (March, the Battle of St. Quentin, the First Battle of Bapaume and the Battle of Rosières), the Advance to Victory (August, Battle of Amiens), the Second Battle of the Somme (August, Battle of Albert) and the battles of the Hindenburg Line (October, Battle of Cambrai and the Pursuit to the Selle).

At the Armistice, it was still serving with 1st Cavalry Division with H, I and Y Batteries RHA (eighteen 13 pounders).

1st Cavalry Division led the advance of the Second Army into Germany, crossing the border on 1 December and the Rhine by 13 December. The brigade was broken up in Germany in early 1919. H Battery transferred to II Brigade, RHA at Bordon in early 1919, I Battery transferred to IV Brigade, RHA at Newbridge and Kilkenny in May 1919, and Y Battery transferred to VIII Brigade, RHA also at Bordon.

=== Post-war reorganisation ===
By October 1919, VII Brigade, RHA was reformed in the United Kingdom with

- P Battery, RHA joined from X Brigade, RHA at Woolwich
- Q Battery, RHA joined from XVI Brigade, RHA in Germany and stationed at Exeter
- R Battery, RHA joined from X Brigade, RHA at Woolwich

This new incarnation was short-lived, however. On 1 March 1920, the brigade was dissolved and the batteries were redesignated as batteries of the Royal Field Artillery.

=== 7th Regiment, RHA ===
Post-World War II plans for the Royal Horse Artillery envisioned a 7th Regiment, RHA. This was to be an Anti-Tank Regiment with R, S, T and U Batteries. Initially formed in the British Army of the Rhine in October 1946, the decision was rescinded in March 1947 before the regiment was fully constituted. On 1 May 1947, the regiment became 12th Anti-Tank Regiment, Royal Artillery.

Another unit, 7th Parachute Regiment Royal Horse Artillery, was formed in 1961.

== Bibliography ==
- Becke, Archibald F. (1935). Order of Battle of Divisions Part 1–The Regular British Divisions. London: HMSO. OCLC 4405016.
- Clarke, W.G. (1993). Horse Gunners: The Royal Horse Artillery, 200 Years of Panache and Professionalism. Woolwich: The Royal Artillery Institution. ISBN 09520762-0-9.
- Frederick, J.B.M. (1984). Lineage Book of British Land Forces 1660-1978. Wakefield, Yorkshire: Microform Academic Publishers. ISBN 1-85117-009-X.
- Lomas, David (1997). Mons 1914: The BEF's Tactical Triumph. Vol. 49 of Campaign Series. Oxford: Osprey. ISBN 1-85532-551-9.
- Order of Battle of the British Armies in France, November 11th, 1918. France: General Staff, GHQ. 1918.
