= IV Brigade, Royal Horse Artillery =

Former horse artillery brigade of the British Army

D Brigade, RHA IV Brigade, RHA
- Active: 19 February 1862 – 14 April 1877; 1 March 1901 – October 1921
- Country: United Kingdom
- Branch: British Army
- Type: Artillery
- Size: Battalion
- Part of: 3rd Cavalry Division
- Engagements: World War I Western Front

IV Brigade, Royal Horse Artillery was a brigade (Note: The basic organic unit of the Royal Artillery was, and is, the Battery. When grouped together they formed brigades, in the same way that infantry battalions or cavalry regiments were grouped together in brigades. At the outbreak of World War I, a field artillery brigade of headquarters (4 officers, 37 other ranks), three batteries (5 and 193 each), and a brigade ammunition column (4 and 154) had a total strength just under 800 so was broadly comparable to an infantry battalion (just over 1,000) or a cavalry regiment (about 550). Like an infantry battalion, an artillery brigade was usually commanded by a Lieutenant-Colonel. Artillery brigades were redesignated as regiments in 1938.) of the Royal Horse Artillery which existed in the early part of the 20th century. It served with 3rd Cavalry Division throughout World War I but was dissolved shortly thereafter.

The successor unit, 4th Regiment, RHA, was formed in 1939 and still exists as 4th Regiment Royal Artillery.

The brigade had an earlier incarnation as D Brigade, Royal Horse Artillery, formed from the Horse Artillery Brigade of the Honourable East India Company's Madras Army in 1862 before being broken up in 1877.

== History ==
=== D Brigade, RHA ===
The Madras Army of the Honourable East India Company formed its first battery of Horse Artillery The Troop of Madras Horse Artillery on 4 April 1805 (still in existence as J Battery, RHA). By 5 August 1825, the Madras Horse Artillery had grown to a peak strength of eight batteries and was organized as two brigades; on 4 January 1831 the brigade system was discontinued and the Madras Horse Artillery shrank to six batteries in a single sequence (A to F Troops).

Although the Madras Army was completely unaffected by the Rebellion, the British Crown took direct control of India from the East India Company on 1 November 1858 under the provisions of the Government of India Act 1858. The Presidency armies transferred to the direct authority of the British Crown and its European units were transferred to the British Army. Henceforth artillery, the mutineers most effective arm, was to be the sole preserve of the British Army (with the exception of certain Mountain Artillery batteries). On 19 February 1862, the Madras Horse Artillery transferred to the Royal Artillery as its 3rd Horse Brigade. (Note: The original Horse Brigade Royal Artillery formed 1st Horse Brigade RA, the 1st Brigade Bengal Horse Artillery became 2nd Horse Brigade RA, the Madras Horse Artillery became 3rd Horse Brigade RA, the Bombay Horse Artillery became 4th Horse Brigade RA and the 2nd Brigade Bengal Horse Artillery became 5th Horse Brigade RA. The 3rd Brigade Bengal Horse Artillery was split between 2nd and 5th Horse Brigades RA. These brigades performed an administrative, rather than tactical, role.) On transfer, 3rd Horse Brigade, Royal Artillery comprised:

- A Battery, 3rd Horse Brigade (A/3) - formerly A Troop, Madras Horse Artillery (Note: Formed as The Troop of Madras Horse Artillery on 4 April 1805, later J Battery, RHA.)
- B Battery, 3rd Horse Brigade (B/3) - formerly B Troop, Madras Horse Artillery (Note: Formed as 2nd Troop, Madras Horse Artillery on 23 January 1809, later M Battery, RHA.)
- C Battery, 3rd Horse Brigade (C/3) - formerly C Troop, Madras Horse Artillery (Note: Formed as the Rocket Troop, Madras Horse Artillery on 23 December 1818, later P Battery, RHA.)
- D Battery, 3rd Horse Brigade (D/3) - formerly D Troop, Madras Horse Artillery (Note: Formed as D Troop, 1st Brigade, Madras Horse Artillery on 5 August 1825, later R Battery, RHA.)

The two remaining batteries of Madras Horse Artillery, E and F Troops (formed on 28 May 1819 as D (Native) Troop and E (Native) Troop), were amalgamated as F Troop on 21 January 1860. F Troop was not transferred to the Royal Artillery and was disbanded on 15 January 1866.

The 1st Brigade with 10 batteries was much larger than the other four (with four to seven batteries each). A reorganization of the Horse Artillery on 13 April 1864 saw 1st Brigade split as A and B Brigades, 2nd Brigade become C Brigade, 3rd become D Horse Brigade, Royal Artillery, 4th become E Brigade, and 5th become F Brigade. As battery designations were tied to the brigade the battery was assigned to, the batteries were also redesignated. D Horse Brigade, RA now comprised:

- A Battery, D Horse Brigade (A/D) - formerly A/3 Battery at Kamptee
- B Battery, D Horse Brigade (B/D) - formerly B/3 Battery at Secunderabad
- C Battery, D Horse Brigade (C/D) - formerly C/3 Battery at Bangalore
- D Battery, D Horse Brigade (D/D) - formerly D/3 Battery at Bellary

From 1866, the term "Royal Horse Artillery" appeared in Army List hence the brigade was designated D Brigade, Royal Horse Artillery from about this time. Another reorganization on 14 April 1877 saw the number of brigades reduced to three (of 10 batteries each) and D Brigade was broken up. Its batteries were transferred to B Brigade and redesignated again, for example, A/D Battery becoming F Battery, B Brigade.

The number of brigades was further reduced to two (of 13 batteries each) in 1882. The brigade system was finally abolished in 1889. Henceforth, batteries were designated in a single alphabetical sequence in order of seniority from date of formation.

=== IV Brigade, RHA ===
==== Formation ====
The brigade system was revived in 1901. Each brigade now commanded just two batteries and a small staff (a Lieutenant-Colonel in command, an adjutant and a brigade sergeant major). Initially, batteries were not assigned to brigades in any particular order, but in 1906, at the insistence of Edward VII, brigades were redesignated so that batteries were roughly in order of seniority (hence I Brigade commanded A Battery and B Battery).

IV Brigade, RHA was formed on 1 March 1901 as the IX Brigade-Division, RHA with F Battery and J Battery. In 1903 it was redesignated as IX Brigade, RHA and was stationed at Rawalpindi (F Battery) and Meerut (J Battery). On 1 October 1906, it was redesignated as IV Brigade, RHA.

==== Mobilisation ====
At the outbreak of World War I, the brigade was split with J Battery at Aldershot (attached to 1st Cavalry Brigade) and F Battery at St John's Wood Barracks (in London District). On mobilisation, J Battery was assigned to the independent 5th Cavalry Brigade and proceeded to France in August 1914. In September 1914, F Battery joined XIV Brigade, RHA which was assigned to 7th Division at Lyndhurst on formation and proceeded to Belgium in October 1914. With the departure of its batteries, the brigade HQ was dissolved.

==== Duplicate numbering ====
Strangely, two Royal Horse Artillery brigades were formed early in World War I and simultaneously designated as XV Brigade, RHA. One was formed at Leamington, Warwickshire in January 1915 with B, L and Y Batteries for 29th Division. The other XV Brigade, RHA was formed on 1 October 1914 for service with the 3rd Cavalry Division and commanded:

- K Battery, RHA joined from VI Brigade, RHA at Christchurch on 1 October and was attached to 7th Cavalry Brigade on 16 October
- C Battery, RHA joined from XIV Brigade, RHA, 7th Division on 19 October and attached to 6th Cavalry Brigade
- G Battery, RHA joined from V Brigade, RHA, 8th Division on 24 November and attached to 8th Cavalry Brigade
- XV RHA Brigade Ammunition Column (BAC)

It was renumbered as IV Brigade, RHA (and IV RHA BAC) in May 1915.

==== World War I service ====
The brigade served with the 3rd Cavalry Division on the Western Front for the rest of the war and the brigade commander acted as Commander Royal Horse Artillery (CRHA) for the division. In practice, the batteries were permanently assigned to the cavalry brigades from October 1914 onwards.

In 1914, the division saw action in the defence of Antwerp (9 and 10 October) and the First Battle of Ypres, notably the battles of Langemarck (21–24 October), Gheluvelt (29–31 October) and Nonne Bosschen (11 November). In 1915, it took part in the Second Battle of Ypres (Battle of Frezenberg Ridge, 11–13 May) and the Battle of Loos (26–28 September). 1916 saw no notable actions, but in 1917 the division saw action in the Battle of Arras (First Battle of the Scarpe, 9–12 April).

In March 1918, 8th Cavalry Brigade was broken up. It was replaced in 3rd Cavalry Division by the Canadian Cavalry Brigade with its attached Royal Canadian Horse Artillery Brigade (A and B Batteries, RCHA each with four 13 pounders) from the disbanding 2nd Indian Cavalry Division. On 13 March, G Battery, RHA was posted to XVII Brigade, RHA (formerly with 2nd Indian Cavalry Division) to bring it back up to three batteries.

1918 saw the return of the war of movement and the division took part in the First Battle of the Somme notably the Battle of St Quentin (21–23 March), Actions of the Somme Crossings (24 and 25 March) and Battle of the Avre (4 and 5 April); the Battle of Amiens and the battles of the Hindenburg Line (Battle of Cambrai, 8 and 9 October and the Pursuit to the Selle, 9–12 October). Its final action was in the Advance in Flanders (9–11 November).

At the Armistice, it was still serving with 3rd Cavalry Division with C and K Batteries RHA (twelve 13 pounders).

==== Post-war reorganisation ====
The brigade was reformed in Newbridge in May 1919. C and K Batteries joined II Brigade, RHA at Bordon and were replaced by I Battery, RHA and L Battery, RHA from Germany and were stationed at Kilkenny and Newbridge. N Battery, RHA came under command in late 1919 when IX Brigade, RHA was broken up. It was stationed at St John's Wood. (Note: Frederick states that T Battery, RHA joined from XIV Brigade, RHA in Germany and was stationed at Aldershot and Newbridge. T Battery was redesignated as 146th Battery, RFA and joined 1st Brigade Royal Field Artillery in May 1920.)

The brigade survived the immediate post-war reductions in the strength of the RHA, but was dissolved in October 1921 and the batteries became independent. N Battery remained at St John's Wood, and I and L Batteries were posted to India.

=== 4th Regiment, RHA ===
The successor unit, 4th Regiment, RHA, was formed on 28 May 1939 at Helmieh, Egypt with C, F and G Batteries, RHA on arrival from India.

== Bibliography ==
- Becke, Archibald F. (1935). Order of Battle of Divisions Part 1–The Regular British Divisions. London: HMSO. OCLC 4405016.
- Clarke, W.G. (1993). Horse Gunners: The Royal Horse Artillery, 200 Years of Panache and Professionalism. Woolwich: The Royal Artillery Institution. ISBN 09520762-0-9.
- Frederick, J.B.M. (1984). Lineage Book of British Land Forces 1660-1978. Wakefield, Yorkshire: Microform Academic Publishers. ISBN 1-85117-009-X.
- Perry, F.W. (1993). Order of Battle of Divisions Part 5B. Indian Army Divisions. Newport: Ray Westlake Military Books. ISBN 1-871167-23-X.
- Order of Battle of the British Armies in France, November 11th, 1918. France: General Staff, GHQ. 1918.
