= III Brigade, Royal Horse Artillery =

Former horse artillery brigade of the British Army

C Brigade, RHA III Brigade, RHA
- Active: 19 February 1862 – 1 April 1882; 1 March 1901 – 27 August 1938
- Country: United Kingdom
- Branch: British Army
- Type: Artillery
- Size: Battalion
- Part of: 1st Cavalry Division; 2nd Cavalry Division
- Engagements: World War I Western Front

III Brigade, Royal Horse Artillery was a brigade (Note: The basic organic unit of the Royal Artillery was, and is, the Battery. When grouped together they formed brigades, in the same way that infantry battalions or cavalry regiments were grouped together in brigades. At the outbreak of World War I, a field artillery brigade of headquarters (4 officers, 37 other ranks), three batteries (5 and 193 each), and a brigade ammunition column (4 and 154) had a total strength just under 800 so was broadly comparable to an infantry battalion (just over 1,000) or a cavalry regiment (about 550). Like an infantry battalion, an artillery brigade was usually commanded by a Lieutenant-Colonel. Artillery brigades were redesignated as regiments in 1938.) of the Royal Horse Artillery which existed in the early part of the 20th century. It served with the 1st and 2nd Cavalry Divisions on the Western Front throughout World War I.

Post-war, the brigade served in the UK and India before being redesignated as 3rd Regiment, RHA in August 1938 in Egypt.

The regiment had an earlier incarnation as C Brigade, RHA, formed from the 1st Brigade of the Honourable East India Company's Bengal Horse Artillery in 1862 before being broken up in 1882.

== History ==
=== C Brigade, RHA ===
The Bengal Army of the Honourable East India Company formed its first battery of Horse Artillery, the Experimental Brigade, Bengal Horse Artillery on 4 December 1800 (still in existence as F Battery, RHA). By the time the Indian Rebellion of 1857 broke out, the Bengal Horse Artillery had grown to 13 batteries, organised as three brigades. four of these batteries were manned by sepoys (native Indian soldiers) and two mutinied: 4th Troop, 1st Brigade at Neemuch and 4th Troop, 3rd Brigade at Multan. All four batteries were promptly reformed as European units.

As a result of the Rebellion, the British Crown took direct control of India from the East India Company on 1 November 1858 under the provisions of the Government of India Act 1858. The Presidency armies transferred to the direct authority of the British Crown and its European units were transferred to the British Army. Henceforth artillery, the mutineers most effective arm, was to be the sole preserve of the British Army (with the exception of certain Mountain Artillery batteries). On 19 February 1862, the Bengal Horse Artillery transferred to the Royal Artillery as its 2nd and 5th Horse Brigades. (Note: The original Horse Brigade Royal Artillery formed 1st Horse Brigade RA, the 1st Brigade Bengal Horse Artillery became 2nd Horse Brigade RA, the Madras Horse Artillery became 3rd Horse Brigade RA, the Bombay Horse Artillery became 4th Horse Brigade RA and the 2nd Brigade Bengal Horse Artillery became 5th Horse Brigade RA. The 3rd Brigade Bengal Horse Artillery was split between 2nd and 5th Horse Brigades RA. These brigades performed an administrative, rather than tactical, role.) On transfer, 2nd Horse Brigade, Royal Artillery comprised:

- A Battery, 2nd Horse Brigade (A/2) - formerly 1st Troop, 1st Brigade Bengal Horse Artillery (Note: Formed as the Experimental Brigade, Bengal Horse Artillery on 4 December 1800, later F Battery, RHA.) at Benares
- B Battery, 2nd Horse Brigade (B/2) - formerly 2nd Troop, 1st Brigade Bengal Horse Artillery (Note: Formed as 8th Troop, Bengal Horse Artillery on 1 March 1825, transferred to Royal Artillery on 1 April 1887 at T Battery, 3rd Brigade.) at Gwalior
- C Battery, 2nd Horse Brigade (C/2) - formerly 3rd Troop, 1st Brigade Bengal Horse Artillery (Note: Formed as 3rd Troop, 1st Brigade, Bengal Horse Artillery on 1 October 1826, transferred to Royal Artillery on 1 April 1887 at H Battery, 3rd Brigade.) at Peshawar
- D Battery, 2nd Horse Brigade (D/2) - formerly 4th Troop, 1st Brigade Bengal Horse Artillery (Note: Formed as 2nd Brigade of Gallopers, Bengal Artillery on 21 July 1817; disbanded on 12 October 1862.) at Meerut
- E Battery, 2nd Horse Brigade (E/2) - formerly 5th Troop, 1st Brigade Bengal Horse Artillery (Note: Formed as Shah Sujah's Troop, Bengal Horse Artillery on 13 September 1838, later T Battery, RHA.) at Allahabad
- F Battery, 2nd Horse Brigade (F/2) - formerly 1st Troop, 3rd Brigade Bengal Horse Artillery (Note: Formed as 3rd Troop, Bengal Horse Artillery on 4 October 1809, later L Battery, RHA.) at Sialkot
- G Battery, 2nd Horse Brigade (G/2) - formerly 2nd Troop, 3rd Brigade Bengal Horse Artillery (Note: Formed as 2nd Troop, 3rd Brigade, Bengal Horse Artillery on 1 July 1825, transferred to Royal Artillery on 1 April 1887 at S Battery, 4th Brigade.) at Jubbulpore

D Battery was disbanded on 12 October 1862.

The 1st Brigade with 10 batteries was much larger than the other four (with four to seven batteries each). A reorganization of the Horse Artillery on 13 April 1864 saw 1st Brigade split as A and B Brigades, 2nd Brigade become C Horse Brigade, Royal Artillery, 3rd become D Brigade, 4th become E Brigade, and 5th become F Brigade. As battery designations were tied to the brigade the battery was assigned to, the batteries were also redesignated. At the same time, the batteries were ordered according to seniority, the first of a bewildering series of battery redesignations. C Horse Brigade, RA now comprised:

- A Battery, C Horse Brigade (A/C) - formerly A/2 Battery at Morar
- B Battery, C Horse Brigade (B/C) - formerly F/2 Battery at Benares
- C Battery, C Horse Brigade (C/C) - formerly B/2 Battery at Meerut
- D Battery, C Horse Brigade (D/C) - formerly G/2 Battery at Meerut
- E Battery, C Horse Brigade (E/C) - formerly C/2 Battery at Rawalpindi
- F Battery, C Horse Brigade (F/C) - formerly E/2 Battery at Lucknow

From 1866, the term "Royal Horse Artillery" appeared in the Army List hence the brigade was designated C Brigade, Royal Horse Artillery from about this time. Another reorganization on 14 April 1877 saw the number of brigades reduced to three (of 10 batteries each). C Brigade was extensively reorganized: its batteries were transferred to the new B Brigade and it was reformed with the batteries of the old E and F Brigades.

The number of brigades was further reduced to two (of 13 batteries each) in 1882. C Brigade was broken up on 1 April 1882 and it batteries transferred to A and B Brigades. The brigade system was finally abolished in 1889. Henceforth, batteries were designated in a single alphabetical sequence in order of seniority from date of formation.

=== III Brigade, RHA ===
==== Formation ====
The brigade system was revived in 1901. Each brigade now commanded just two batteries and a small staff (a Lieutenant-Colonel in command, an adjutant and a brigade sergeant major). Initially, batteries were not assigned to brigades in any particular order, but in 1906, at the insistence of Edward VII, brigades were redesignated so that batteries were roughly in order of seniority (hence I Brigade commanded A Battery and B Battery).

III Brigade, RHA was formed on 1 March 1901 as the X Brigade-Division, RHA with D Battery and E Battery. In 1903 it was redesignated as X Brigade, RHA and was stationed at Mhow. On 1 October 1906, it was redesignated as III Brigade, RHA.

==== World War I service ====
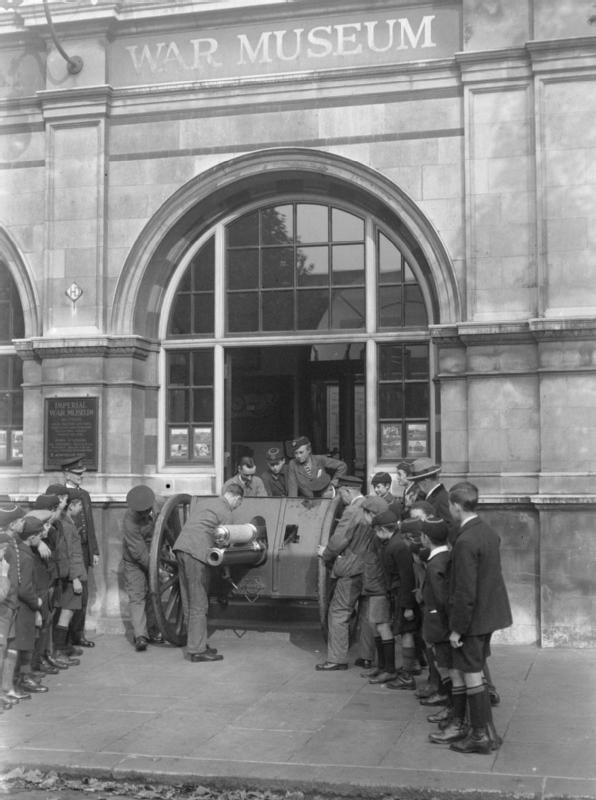
The 13-pounder gun of E Battery, RHA that fired the first British artillery round on the Western front leaves the Imperial War Museum to take part in the unveiling of the Royal Artillery Memorial in October 1925

At the outbreak of World War I, the brigade was at Newbridge attached to 3rd Cavalry Brigade, still commanding D and E Batteries. On mobilization, it was assigned to The Cavalry Division (later 1st Cavalry Division) along with VII Brigade, RHA.

The division crossed to France between 15 and 18 August 1914, concentrated around Maubeuge between 18 and 20 August, and moved forward towards Mons on 21 August. Its first action was the Battle of Mons on 23 and 24 August where the division formed the left flank. It took part in the subsequent retreat, notably the Actions of Elouges and Solesmes, the Battle of Le Cateau, the action at Néry and the First Battle of the Marne.

On 17 September, the brigade transferred to the 2nd Cavalry Division on formation. The brigade served with the 2nd Cavalry Division on the Western Front for the rest of the war. The brigade commander acted as Commander Royal Horse Artillery (CRHA) for the division. In practice, the batteries were permanently assigned to the cavalry brigades from September 1914 onwards:

- D Battery, RHA assigned to 3rd Cavalry Brigade from 17 September
- E Battery, RHA assigned to 5th Cavalry Brigade from 17 September
- J Battery, RHA joined with 4th Cavalry Brigade from 1st Cavalry Division on 14 October

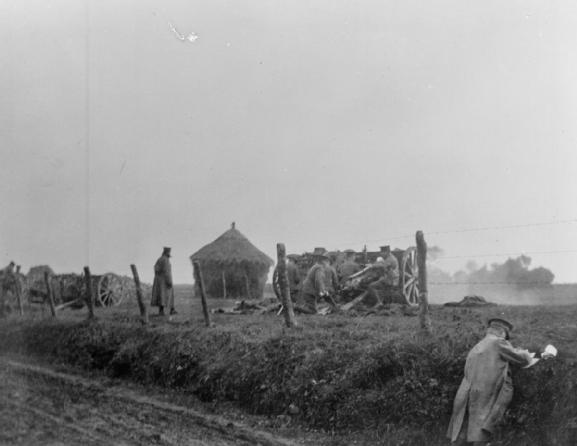
J Battery Royal Horse Artillery in action near the Messines Ridge, October 1914.

In 1914, The division took part in the battles of Messines (12 October – 2 November) and Armentières (12–17 October) and in the First Battle of Ypres, notably the battle of Gheluvelt (29–31 October). In 1915, it took part in the Battle of Neuve Chapelle (10–12 March) and the Second Battle of Ypres (battles of St Julien, 26 April – 3 May, and Bellewaarde Ridge, 24 and 25 May). 1916 saw no notable actions, but in 1917 the brigade supported the division in a number of major actions including the Battle of Arras (9–11 April, First Battle of the Scarpe) and the Battle of Cambrai (November and December, including the Tank Attack, the Capture of Bourlon Wood and the German Counter-attacks).

1918 saw the return of the war of movement and the division was involved in a large number of actions: the First Battle of the Somme notably the Battle of St Quentin (21–23 March), the Battle of the Lys (battle of Hazebrouck, 14 and 15 April), the Battle of Amiens (8–11 August), the Second Battle of the Somme (the Battle of Albert, 21–23 August, and the Second Battle of Bapaume, 31 August – 3 September), and the battles of the Hindenburg Line (Battle of the Canal du Nord, 27 September – 1 October, Battle of Cambrai, 8 and 9 October, and the Pursuit to the Selle, 9–12 October). Its final action was in the Capture of Mons (11 November, 3rd Canadian Division with 5th (Royal Irish) Lancers and one section (Note: A Subsection consisted of a single gun and limber drawn by six horses (with three drivers), eight gunners (riding on the limber or mounted on their own horses), and an ammunition wagon also drawn by six horses (with three drivers). Two Subsections formed a Section and in a six gun battery these would be designated as Left, Centre and Right Sections.) of D Battery, RHA).

At the Armistice, it was still serving with 2nd Cavalry Division with D, E and J Batteries RHA (eighteen 13 pounders).

==== Post-war ====
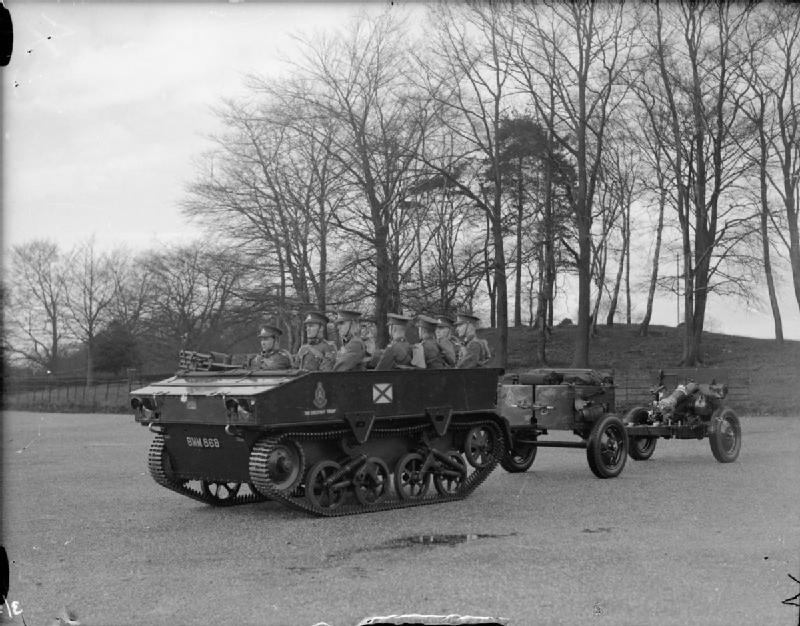
Vickers Light Dragon Mark II tractor towing a 3.7 inch howitzer on Carriage Mk IV and limber.

The brigade moved from Belgium to Aldershot in March 1919, less E Battery, RHA which joined V Brigade, RHA in Germany. It was replaced by F Battery, RHA as St John's Wood Barracks. Between January and March 1920 it moved to India, where D Battery was stationed at Lucknow, F Battery at Ambala and J Battery at Secunderabad. In October 1923, the brigade moved to Egypt, before returning to Newport in November 1926 (D Battery at Trowbridge). It moved to Aldershot in November 1929 and Abbassia, Egypt in September 1937. By now it commanded D, J and M Batteries. The brigade was mechanised in Egypt, replacing its horses and 13 pounders with 3.7" Howitzers towed by Light Dragon gun tractors.

=== 3rd Regiment, RHA ===
In 1938, field artillery brigades were reorganised as two 12-gun batteries. As a result, the existing 6-gun batteries were linked in pairs. On 11 May, D Battery and J Battery were linked as D/J Battery, RHA and M Battery and P Battery (from 21st Anti Tank Regiment) were linked as M/P Battery, RHA.

With effect from May 1938, brigades were redesignated as regiments. This did not take effect in III Brigade until 27 August 1938 when it became 3rd Regiment, RHA.

== Bibliography ==
- Becke, Major A.F. (1935). Order of Battle of Divisions Part 1. The Regular British Divisions. London: His Majesty's Stationery Office.
- Clarke, W.G. (1993). Horse Gunners: The Royal Horse Artillery, 200 Years of Panache and Professionalism. Woolwich: The Royal Artillery Institution. ISBN 09520762-0-9.
- Frederick, J.B.M. (1984). Lineage Book of British Land Forces 1660-1978. Wakefield, Yorkshire: Microform Academic Publishers. ISBN 1-85117-009-X.
- Lomas, David (1997). Mons 1914: The BEF's Tactical Triumph. Vol. 49 of Campaign Series. Oxford: Osprey. ISBN 1-85532-551-9.
- Order of Battle of the British Armies in France, November 11th, 1918. France: General Staff, GHQ. 1918.
