= VIII Brigade, Royal Horse Artillery =

Former horse artillery brigade of the British Army

VIII Brigade, RHA 8th Regiment, RHA
- Active: 1 March 1901 – 12 December 1914; October 1919 – 14 February 1920; October 1946 – March 1947
- Country: United Kingdom
- Branch: British Army
- Type: Artillery
- Size: Battalion

VIII Brigade, Royal Horse Artillery was a brigade (Note: The basic organic unit of the Royal Artillery was, and is, the Battery. When grouped together they formed brigades, in the same way that infantry battalions or cavalry regiments were grouped together in brigades. At the outbreak of World War I, a field artillery brigade of headquarters (4 officers, 37 other ranks), three batteries (5 and 193 each), and a brigade ammunition column (4 and 154) had a total strength just under 800 so was broadly comparable to an infantry battalion (just over 1,000) or a cavalry regiment (about 550). Like an infantry battalion, an artillery brigade was usually commanded by a Lieutenant-Colonel. Artillery brigades were redesignated as regiments in 1938.) of the Royal Horse Artillery which existed in the early part of the 20th century. It was dissolved at the outbreak of World War I as its constituent batteries were posted to other formations. It was briefly resurrected post-war before being dissolved once again. A related unit 8th Regiment, Royal Horse Artillery also had a brief existence post-World War II.

== History ==
=== First formation ===
Royal Horse Artillery brigades did not exist as an organizational or operational grouping of batteries until 1 July 1859 when the Horse Brigade, Royal Artillery was formed. The brigade system was extended to five (later six) brigades when the horse artillery of the Honourable East India Company had been transferred to the British Army in 1861. These brigades were reduced to five in 1871, then to three (of 10 batteries each) in 1877 and to two (of 13 batteries each) in 1882. The brigade system was finally abolished in 1889.

As battery designations were tied to the brigade that the battery was assigned to, batteries were redesignated in a bewildering sequence as they were transferred between brigades. For example, E Battery of C Brigade (E/C Bty) might become N Battery of A Brigade (N/A Bty) upon transfer. Henceforth, batteries were designated in a single alphabetical sequence in order of seniority from date of formation.

The brigade system was revived in 1901. Each brigade now commanded just two batteries and a small staff (a Lieutenant-Colonel in command, an adjutant and a brigade sergeant major). Initially, batteries were not assigned to brigades in any particular order, but in 1906, at the insistence of Edward VII, brigades were redesignated so that batteries were roughly in order of seniority (hence I Brigade commanded A Battery and B Battery).

VIII Brigade, RHA was formed on 1 March 1901 as the XIV Brigade-Division, RHA with M Battery and Q Battery. In 1903 it was redesignated as XIV Brigade, RHA and was stationed at Woolwich. On 1 October 1906, it was redesignated as VIII Brigade, RHA.

By the time World War I broke out, the brigade was in Peshawar, India assigned to 1st (Peshawar) Division. M Battery was at Risalpur and on mobilization was assigned to the 1st (Risalpur) Cavalry Brigade. It remained in India throughout the war. Q Battery was at Sialkot with 2nd (Rawalpindi) Division and on mobilization was assigned to the newly formed I Indian Brigade, RHA with 1st Indian Cavalry Division (attached to 2nd (Sialkot) Cavalry Brigade) and sailed for the Western Front in October 1914. With the departure of its batteries, the brigade HQ was dissolved on 12 December 1914.

=== Second formation ===
By October 1919, VIII Brigade, RHA was reformed in the United Kingdom with

- Y Battery, RHA from VII Brigade, RHA and stationed at Bordon
- Z Battery, RHA from V Brigade, RHA and stationed at Bordon
- AA Battery, RHA (Note: From 1 July 1889, RHA batteries were lettered in a single alphabetical sequence in order of seniority from date of formation. When more than 26 batteries were needed, double letters were used, AA, BB, etc.) from X Brigade, RHA and stationed at Woolwich

This new incarnation was short-lived, however. On 20 November 1919 Y Battery was absorbed in A Battery, on 7 January 1920 Z Battery was absorbed in B Battery and on 11 February 1920 AA Battery was absorbed in M Battery, all of I Brigade, RHA. Finally, on 14 February 1920 the Headquarters was absorbed into the HQ of I Brigade.

=== 8th Regiment, RHA ===
Post-World War II plans for the Royal Horse Artillery envisioned an 8th Regiment, RHA. This was to be a Light Anti-Aircraft (LAA) Regiment with V, W and X Batteries. Initially formed in the British Army of the Rhine in October 1946, the decision was rescinded in March 1947 before the regiment was fully constituted. On 1 April 1947, the regiment became 10th Field Regiment, Royal Artillery.

== Bibliography ==
- Clarke, W.G. (1993). Horse Gunners: The Royal Horse Artillery, 200 Years of Panache and Professionalism. Woolwich: The Royal Artillery Institution. ISBN 09520762-0-9.
- Frederick, J.B.M. (1984). Lineage Book of British Land Forces 1660-1978. Wakefield, Yorkshire: Microform Academic Publishers. ISBN 1-85117-009-X.
- Perry, F.W. (1993). Order of Battle of Divisions Part 5B. Indian Army Divisions. Newport: Ray Westlake Military Books. ISBN 1-871167-23-X.
