= XVI Brigade, Royal Horse Artillery =

Former horse artillery brigade of the British Army

I Indian Brigade, RHA XVI Brigade, RHA XVI Army Brigade, RHA
- Active: 12 December 1914 – April 1919
- Country: United Kingdom
- Branch: British Army
- Type: Artillery
- Size: Battalion
- Part of: 1st Indian Cavalry Division; Fourth Army
- Engagements: World War I Western Front

I Indian Brigade, Royal Horse Artillery was a brigade (Note: The basic organic unit of the Royal Artillery was, and is, the Battery. When grouped together they formed brigades, in the same way that infantry battalions or cavalry regiments were grouped together in brigades. At the outbreak of World War I, a field artillery brigade of headquarters (4 officers, 37 other ranks), three batteries (5 and 193 each), and a brigade ammunition column (4 and 154) had a total strength just under 800 so was broadly comparable to an infantry battalion (just over 1,000) or a cavalry regiment (about 550). Like an infantry battalion, an artillery brigade was usually commanded by a Lieutenant-Colonel. Artillery brigades were redesignated as regiments in 1938.) of the Royal Horse Artillery formed at the outbreak of World War I. It served with 1st Indian Cavalry Division on the Western Front. It was redesignated XVI Brigade, RHA in February 1917 and XVI Army Brigade, RHA in March 1918. It was disbanded after the war.

== History ==
=== I Indian Brigade, RHA ===
I Indian Brigade, RHA was formed on 12 December 1914 for the 1st Indian Cavalry Division in France. It commanded

- A Battery of I Brigade, RHA at Ambala, India
- Q Battery of VIII Brigade, RHA at Peshawar, India
- U Battery of XI Brigade, RHA at Lucknow, India
- I Indian RHA Brigade Ammunition Column

Each battery was armed with six 13 pounder guns.

The brigade served with the 1st Indian Cavalry Division on the Western Front and the brigade commander acted as Commander Royal Horse Artillery (CRHA). In practice, the batteries were permanently assigned to the cavalry brigades, viz:

- A Battery with 3rd (Ambala) Cavalry Brigade then 5th (Mhow) Cavalry Brigade from 15 September 1915 when it arrived from 2nd Indian Cavalry Division
- Q Battery with 2nd (Sialkot) Cavalry Brigade
- U Battery with 8th (Lucknow) Cavalry Brigade

Other than the Battle of Cambrai when it helped to hold the German counter-attack, the division was not involved in battle. Instead, it was held in reserve in case of a breakthrough, although it did send parties to the trenches on a number of occasions. They would hold the line, or act as Pioneers; such parties were designated as, for example, the Mhow Battalion.

=== XVI Brigade, RHA ===
On 26 November 1916, 1st Indian Cavalry Division was renamed 4th Cavalry Division. Consequently, on 24 February 1917, the brigade was redesignated as XVI Brigade, RHA.

In March 1918, the 4th Cavalry Division was broken up in France. The British units remained in France and the Indian elements were sent to Egypt to help constitute 1st Mounted Division. The brigade became XVI Army Brigade, RHA. (Note: Army Brigades, RHA and RFA were artillery brigades that were excess to the needs of the divisions, withdrawn to form an artillery reserve.) About this time the brigade's 13 pounders were replaced by 18 pounders. At the Armistice, it was serving as Army Troops with the Fourth Army commanding A, Q, and U Batteries, RHA (eighteen 18 pounders). The brigade moved to Germany as part of the Army of Occupation.

=== Dissolved ===
The brigade was broken up in Germany in April 1919 and the batteries returned to England. A Battery joined I Brigade, RHA at Woolwich, Q Battery joined VII Brigade, RHA at Exeter and U Battery joined IX Brigade, RHA at Trowbridge.

== Bibliography ==
- Clarke, W.G. (1993). Horse Gunners: The Royal Horse Artillery, 200 Years of Panache and Professionalism. Woolwich: The Royal Artillery Institution. ISBN 09520762-0-9.
- Frederick, J.B.M. (1984). Lineage Book of British Land Forces 1660-1978. Wakefield, Yorkshire: Microform Academic Publishers. ISBN 1-85117-009-X.
- Perry, F.W. (1993). Order of Battle of Divisions Part 5B. Indian Army Divisions. Newport: Ray Westlake Military Books. ISBN 1-871167-23-X.
- Order of Battle of the British Armies in France, November 11th, 1918. France: General Staff, GHQ. 1918.
