= 7th Regiment Royal Horse Artillery (disambiguation) =

7th Regiment, Royal Horse Artillery was an anti-tank regiment of the Royal Regiment of Artillery that existed 1946–1947 before being renamed 12th Regiment Royal Artillery.

7th Regiment Royal Horse Artillery may also refer to:

- VII Brigade, Royal Horse Artillery, a regiment-sized unit of the Royal Regiment of Artillery during World War One
- 7th Parachute Regiment Royal Horse Artillery, the modern regular unit of the Royal Regiment of Artillery
