= 2nd (Sialkot) Cavalry Brigade =

Sialkot Cavalry Brigade 2nd (Sialkot) Cavalry Brigade 2nd Indian Cavalry Brigade Sialkot Brigade Area
- Active: 12 April 1904 – March 1918; June 1920 – January 1940
- Country: British India
- Allegiance: British Crown
- Branch: British Indian Army
- Type: Cavalry
- Size: Brigade
- Part of: 2nd (Rawalpindi) Division; 1st Indian Cavalry Division
- Peacetime HQ: Sialkot
- Engagements: First World War Western Front Battle of Cambrai (1917)

Commanders
- Notable commanders: Br.-Gen. B.T. Mahon

The Sialkot Cavalry Brigade was a cavalry brigade of the British Indian Army formed in 1904 as a result of the Kitchener Reforms. It was mobilized as 2nd (Sialkot) Cavalry Brigade at the outbreak of the First World War as part of the 1st Indian Cavalry Division and departed for France. It served on the Western Front with the division until it was broken up in March 1918.

The brigade was reformed in June 1920 and broken up in January 1940.

== History ==
The Kitchener Reforms, carried out during Lord Kitchener's tenure as Commander-in-Chief, India (1902–09), completed the unification of the three former Presidency armies, the Punjab Frontier Force, the Hyderabad Contingent and other local forces into one Indian Army. Kitchener identified the Indian Army's main task as the defence of the North-West Frontier against foreign aggression (particularly Russian expansion into Afghanistan) with internal security relegated to a secondary role. The Army was organized into divisions and brigades that would act as field formations but also included internal security troops.

The Sialkot Brigade (also referred to as Sialkote Brigade) was formed in April 1904 (Note: 12 April 1904 was the appointment date of the brigade's first commanding officer.) as a result of the Kitchener Reforms. The brigade formed part of the 2nd (Rawalpindi) Division. By the outbreak of the First World War it was designated as Sialkot Cavalry Brigade.

2nd (Sialkot) Cavalry Brigade

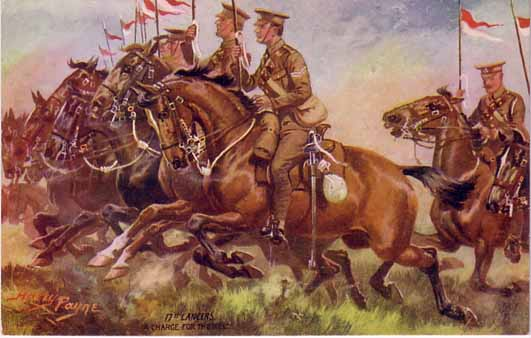
The 17th Lancers advancing, wearing their early-war uniform, postcard after Harry Payne

In September 1914, the brigade was mobilized as the 2nd (Sialkot) Cavalry Brigade and assigned to the 1st Indian Cavalry Division. With the division, it departed Bombay on 16 October 1914 and landed at Marseille on 7 November. However, the brigade did not reach the Front until 8–10 December due to horse sickness. While in France, the brigade was known by its geographical rather than numerical designation so as to avoid confusion with the British 2nd Cavalry Brigade also serving on the Western Front at the same time.

Other than the Battle of Cambrai when it helped to hold the German counter-attack, it was not involved in battle. Instead, it was held in reserve in case of a breakthrough, although it did send parties to the trenches on a number of occasions. They would hold the line, or act as Pioneers; such parties were designated as the Sialkot Battalion.

Dissolved

In March 1918, the brigade was broken up in France. The British units (17th (Duke of Cambridge's Own) Lancers and Q Battery, Royal Horse Artillery) remained in France and the Indian elements were sent to Egypt. On 24 April 1918, these were merged with the 22nd Mounted Brigade of the Yeomanry Mounted Division. On 22 July 1918 the 22nd Mounted Brigade was redesignated as 12th Cavalry Brigade and the division as 4th Cavalry Division.

Reformed

The Sialkot Cavalry Brigade was reformed in June 1920. In September 1920 it was designated as the 2nd Indian Cavalry Brigade and renamed as 2nd (Sialkot) Cavalry Brigade in 1927. By the outbreak of the Second World War it was resdesignated as Sialkot Brigade Area (Note: The brigade was still designated as 2nd (Sialkot) Cavalry Brigade on 9 June 1938.) and it was broken up again in January 1940.

== Orders of battle ==
In India in August 1914
At the outbreak of the First World War, the brigade had the following composition:
- 17th (Duke of Cambridge's Own) Lancers
- 6th King Edward's Own Cavalry
- 19th Lancers (Fane's Horse)
- 1st Battalion, Alexandra, Princess of Wales's Own (Yorkshire Regiment) (transferred to Delhi in October 1914)
- 32nd Sikh Pioneers (remained at Sialkot in September 1914)

Western Front
The brigade's composition on the Western Front included:
- 17th (Duke of Cambridge's Own) Lancers
- 6th King Edward's Own Cavalry
- 19th Lancers (Fane's Horse)
- Q Battery, Royal Horse Artillery (joined in September 1914 from VIII Brigade, Royal Horse Artillery at Peshawar) (Note: Q Battery, Royal Horse Artillery was assigned to II Indian Brigade, Royal Horse Artillery but in practice was permanently attached to the brigade.)
- Sialkot Signal Troop, Royal Engineers
- 10th Machine Gun Squadron (joined after February 1916) (Note: 10th Machine Gun Squadron was formed after February 1916 by combining the machine gun sections of the 17th Lancers (Duke of Cambridge's Own), 6th King Edward's Own Cavalry and 19th Lancers (Fane's Horse).)

Sialkot Brigade Area on 3 September 1939
At the outbreak of the Second World War, the brigade area had the following units under command:
- 3rd Dragoon Guards (at Khanspur Hill)
- 13th Lancers
- 10th Battalion, 12th Frontier Force Regiment (Note: 10th Battalion, 12th Frontier Force Regiment was the Training Battalion / Regimental Centre of the 12th Frontier Force Regiment.)
- 10th Battalion, 16th Punjab Regiment (Note: 10th Battalion, 16th Punjab Regiment was the Training Battalion / Regimental Centre of the 16th Punjab Regiment.)

== Commanders ==
The Sialkot Cavalry Brigade / 2nd (Sialkot) Cavalry Brigade had the following commanders:

From	Rank	Name	Notes
12 April 1904	Brigadier-General	B.T. Mahon	
April 1908	Major-General	A. Phayre	
1 June 1911	Brigadier-General	H.P. Leader	
6 January 1916	Brigadier-General	L.L. Maxwell	Broken up in March 1918
June 1920	Brigadier-General	C.H. Rankin	Brigade re-formed
June 1924	Brigadier-General	C.R. Harbord	
June 1928	Brigadier	C.R. Terrot	
June 1932	Brigadier	T.A.A. Wilson	
August 1934	Brigadier	F. Gwatkin	
August 1938	Brigadier	T.W. Corbett	Broken up in January 1940

== See also ==
- Indian Cavalry Corps order of battle First World War
- Indian Expeditionary Force A

== Bibliography ==
- Becke, Major A.F. (1988) [1936]. Order of Battle of Divisions Part 2A. The Territorial Force Mounted Divisions and the 1st-Line Territorial Force Divisions (42-56) (Reprint ed.). London: His Majesty's Stationery Office. ISBN 1-871167-12-4.
- Gaylor, John (1996). Sons of John Company: The Indian and Pakistan Armies 1903–1991 (2nd ed.). Tunbridge Wells: Parapress. ISBN 1-898594-41-4.
- Griffith, Paddy (1998). British Fighting Methods in the Great War. Routledge. ISBN 978-071463495-1.
- Haythornthwaite, Philip J. (1996). The World War One Source Book. London: Arms and Armour Press. ISBN 1-85409-351-7.
- Mackie, Colin (June 2015). "Army Commands 1900-2011" (PDF). gulabin.com. Archived from the original (PDF) on 5 July 2015.
- Nafziger, George (n.d.). "The Indian Army 3 September 1939" (PDF). Fort Leavenworth: Combined Arms Research Library, United States Army Combined Arms Center.
- Perry, F.W. (1993). Order of Battle of Divisions Part 5B. Indian Army Divisions. Newport: Ray Westlake Military Books. ISBN 1-871167-23-X.
- Rinaldi, Richard A (2008). Order of Battle of the British Army 1914. Ravi Rikhye. ISBN 978-0-97760728-0.
