= V Brigade, Royal Horse Artillery =

Former horse artillery brigade of the British Army

E Brigade, RHA V Brigade, RHA
- Active: 19 February 1862 – 1 February 1871; 31 March 1875 – 14 April 1877; 1 March 1901 – October 1928
- Country: United Kingdom
- Branch: British Army
- Type: Artillery
- Size: Battalion
- Part of: 8th Division; Fourth Army
- Engagements: World War I Western Front

V Brigade, Royal Horse Artillery was a brigade (Note: The basic organic unit of the Royal Artillery was, and is, the Battery. When grouped together they formed brigades, in the same way that infantry battalions or cavalry regiments were grouped together in brigades. At the outbreak of World War I, a field artillery brigade of headquarters (4 officers, 37 other ranks), three batteries (5 and 193 each), and a brigade ammunition column (4 and 154) had a total strength just under 800 so was broadly comparable to an infantry battalion (just over 1,000) or a cavalry regiment (about 550). Like an infantry battalion, an artillery brigade was usually commanded by a Lieutenant-Colonel. Artillery brigades were redesignated as regiments in 1938.) of the Royal Horse Artillery which existed in the early part of the 20th century. It served with 8th Division on the Western Front in World War I before becoming V Army Brigade, RHA in January 1917. It was reformed after the war but was disbanded in October 1928.

The successor unit, 5th Regiment, RHA, was formed in 1939 and still exists as 5th Regiment Royal Artillery.

The brigade had an earlier incarnation as E Brigade, RHA, formed from the Horse Artillery Brigade of the Honourable East India Company's Bombay Army in 1862 before being broken up in 1877.

== History ==
=== E Brigade, RHA ===
The Bombay Army of the Honourable East India Company was the last of the Presidency armies to form Horse Artillery, only forming the 1st Troop, Bombay Horse Artillery on 11 November 1811 (still in existence as N Battery, RHA). By the time the Indian Rebellion of 1857 broke out, the Bombay Horse Artillery had grown to four batteries, organized as the Horse Brigade, Bombay Artillery.

Although the Bombay Army was almost completely unaffected by the Rebellion, the British Crown took direct control of India from the East India Company on 1 November 1858 under the provisions of the Government of India Act 1858. The Presidency armies transferred to the direct authority of the British Crown and its European units were transferred to the British Army. Henceforth artillery, the mutineers most effective arm, was to be the sole preserve of the British Army (with the exception of certain Mountain Artillery batteries). On 19 February 1862, the Bombay Horse Artillery transferred to the Royal Artillery as its 4th Horse Brigade. (Note: The original Horse Brigade Royal Artillery formed 1st Horse Brigade RA, the 1st Brigade Bengal Horse Artillery became 2nd Horse Brigade RA, the Madras Horse Artillery became 3rd Horse Brigade RA, the Bombay Horse Artillery became 4th Horse Brigade RA and the 2nd Brigade Bengal Horse Artillery became 5th Horse Brigade RA. The 3rd Brigade Bengal Horse Artillery was split between 2nd and 5th Horse Brigades RA. These brigades performed an administrative, rather than tactical, role.) On transfer, 4th Horse Brigade, Royal Artillery comprised:

- A Battery, 4th Horse Brigade (A/4) - formerly 1st Troop, Bombay Horse Artillery (Note: Formed as 1st Troop, Bombay Horse Artillery on 11 November 1811, later N Battery, RHA.) at Deesa
- B Battery, 4th Horse Brigade (B/4) - formerly 2nd Troop, Bombay Horse Artillery (Note: Formed as 2nd Troop, Bombay Horse Artillery on 21 January 1820, later Y Battery, RHA.) at Kirkee
- C Battery, 4th Horse Brigade (C/4) - formerly 3rd Troop, Bombay Horse Artillery (Note: Formed as 3rd Troop, Bombay Horse Artillery on 1 March 1824, later Q Battery, RHA.) at Nusserabad
- D Battery, 4th Horse Brigade (D/4) - formerly 4th Troop, Bombay Horse Artillery (Note: Formed as 4th Troop, Bombay Horse Artillery on 1 April 1824, later Z Battery, RHA.) at Ahmednagar

The 1st Brigade with 10 batteries was much larger than the other four (with four to seven batteries each). A reorganization of the Horse Artillery on 13 April 1864 saw 1st Brigade split as A and B Brigades, 2nd Brigade become C Brigade, 3rd become D Brigade, 4th become E Horse Brigade, Royal Artillery, and 5th become F Brigade. As battery designations were tied to the brigade the battery was assigned to, the batteries were also redesignated, the first of a bewildering series of redesignations. E Horse Brigade, RA now comprised:

- A Battery, E Horse Brigade (A/E) - formerly A/4 Battery at Nusserabad
- B Battery, E Horse Brigade (B/E) - formerly B/4 Battery at Kirkee
- C Battery, E Horse Brigade (C/E) - formerly C/4 Battery at Mhow
- D Battery, E Horse Brigade (D/E) - formerly D/4 Battery at Ahmednagar

From 1866, the term "Royal Horse Artillery" appeared in Army List hence the brigade was designated E Brigade, Royal Horse Artillery from about this time. The brigade was broken up on 1 February 1871 and the batteries were transferred to C and D Brigades. (Note: A Battery as C Battery, D Brigade (C/D); B Battery as E Battery, D Brigade (E/D); C Battery as G Battery, C Brigade (G/C); and D Battery as H Battery, C Brigade (H/C).) It was reformed on 31 March 1875 with five batteries. (Note: A Battery was F Battery, B Brigade (F/B); B Battery was G Battery, B Brigade (G/B); C Battery was F Battery, D Brigade (F/D); and D Battery was G Battery, D Brigade (G/D); and E Battery was H Battery, D Brigade (H/D).) Another reorganization on 14 April 1877 saw the number of brigades reduced to three (of 10 batteries each) and E Brigade was broken up again. Its batteries were transferred to C Brigade and redesignated again, for example, A/E Battery becoming A Battery, C Brigade.

The number of brigades was further reduced to two (of 13 batteries each) in 1882. The brigade system was finally abolished in 1889. Henceforth, batteries were designated in a single alphabetical sequence in order of seniority from date of formation.

=== V Brigade, RHA ===
==== Formation ====
The brigade system was revived in 1901. Each brigade now commanded just two batteries and a small staff (a Lieutenant-Colonel in command, an adjutant and a brigade sergeant major). Initially, batteries were not assigned to brigades in any particular order, but in 1906, at the insistence of Edward VII, brigades were redesignated so that batteries were roughly in order of seniority (hence I Brigade commanded A Battery and B Battery).

V Brigade, RHA was formed on 1 March 1901 as the XI Brigade-Division, RHA with G Battery and O Battery. In 1903 it was redesignated as XI Brigade, RHA and was stationed at Ambala. On 1 October 1906, it was redesignated as V Brigade, RHA.

==== World War I ====
At the outbreak of World War I, the brigade was at Ipswich attached to 5th Cavalry Brigade, still commanding G and O Batteries. On 9 October 1914, the newly reformed Z Battery, RHA joined the brigade.

It joined 8th Division at Winchester on formation. With 8th Division, it crossed to France on 4 and 5 November 1914 (landing at Le Havre on 6 and 7 November) and served with the division on the Western Front until January 1917. While with the division, it saw action at the battles of Neuve-Chapelle (Moated Grange Attack, 18 December 1914), Neuve Chapelle again (10–13 March 1915), Aubers Ridge (9 May 1915), Bois-Grenier (25 September 1915), and of the Somme (Battle of Albert on 1 July 1916 and Battle of Le Transloy on 23–30 October).

On 24 November 1914, G Battery was transferred to XV (later IV) Brigade, RHA in 3rd Cavalry Division. O and Z batteries exchanged their 13 pounders for 18 pounders on 8 June 1915. It remained as a two-battery brigade until 8 May 1916 when D(H) Battery joined (designated D(H)/V Battery and armed with four 4.5" howitzers). This was formed from one section (Note: A Subsection consisted of a single gun and limber drawn by six horses (with three drivers), eight gunners (riding on the limber or mounted on their own horses), and an ammunition wagon also drawn by six horses (with three drivers). Two Subsections formed a Section and in a six gun battery these would be designated as Left, Centre and Right Sections.) of 55th (H) Battery and one section of 57th (H) Battery, both of CXXVIII (H) Brigade, RFA. D(H)/V Battery was broken up on 13 January 1917 and the sections returned to their parent batteries.

==== Army brigade ====
On 13 January 1917, the brigade left 8th Division and became V Army Brigade, RHA. (Note: Army Brigades, RHA and RFA were artillery brigades that were excess to the needs of the divisions, withdrawn to form an artillery reserve.) On the same day, B Battery of CLXXXVIII Brigade, RFA (B/CLXXXVIII Battery) joined and was renamed as A/V Battery. A/V Battery was redesignated as 402nd Battery on 1 June. On 9 April 1918, G and N Batteries, RHA joined from XVII Army Brigade, RHA (Note: Frederick says N Battery joined V Brigade on 13 January 1917. Perry claims the N Battery was still with XVII Brigade, RHA in March 1918.) and 402nd Battery transferred to XIV Brigade, RFA as 141st Battery, RFA.

At the Armistice, the brigade was serving as Army Troops with the Fourth Army with G, N, O and Z Batteries RHA (twenty four 18 pounders).

==== Post-war reorganisation ====
The brigade took part in the Victory Parade in Paris in July 1919. It returned to Aldershot from Germany in October 1919. At this point, N Battery was then transferred to IX Brigade, RHA and Z Battery to VIII Brigade, RHA; E Battery, RHA joined from III Brigade, RHA. The brigade survived the immediate post-war reductions in the strength of the RHA, serving on as the junior-most brigade, but was broken up at Meerut in October 1928.

=== 5th Regiment, RHA ===
The successor unit, 5th Regiment, RHA, was formed on 25 November 1939 at Wotton-under-Edge, Gloucestershire with G Battery, RHA and K Battery, RHA.

== Bibliography ==
- Becke, Archibald F. (1935). Order of Battle of Divisions Part 1–The Regular British Divisions. London: HMSO. OCLC 4405016.
- Clarke, W.G. (1993). Horse Gunners: The Royal Horse Artillery, 200 Years of Panache and Professionalism. Woolwich: The Royal Artillery Institution. ISBN 09520762-0-9.
- Frederick, J.B.M. (1984). Lineage Book of British Land Forces 1660-1978. Wakefield, Yorkshire: Microform Academic Publishers. ISBN 1-85117-009-X.
- Perry, F.W. (1993). Order of Battle of Divisions Part 5B. Indian Army Divisions. Newport: Ray Westlake Military Books. ISBN 1-871167-23-X.
- Order of Battle of the British Armies in France, November 11th, 1918. France: General Staff, GHQ. 1918.
