= I Brigade, Royal Horse Artillery =

Former horse artillery brigade of the British Army

A Brigade, RHA I Brigade, RHA
- Active: 1 July 1859 – 1 July 1889; 1 March 1901 – October 1914; March 1919 – 11 May 1938
- Country: United Kingdom
- Branch: British Army
- Type: Artillery
- Size: Battalion

I Brigade, Royal Horse Artillery was a brigade (Note: The basic organic unit of the Royal Artillery was, and is, the Battery. When grouped together they formed brigades, in the same way that infantry battalions or cavalry regiments were grouped together in brigades. At the outbreak of World War I, a field artillery brigade of headquarters (4 officers, 37 other ranks), three batteries (5 and 193 each), and a brigade ammunition column (4 and 154) had a total strength just under 800 so was broadly comparable to an infantry battalion (just over 1,000) or a cavalry regiment (about 550). Like an infantry battalion, an artillery brigade was usually commanded by a Lieutenant-Colonel. Artillery brigades were redesignated as regiments in 1938.) of the Royal Horse Artillery which existed in the early part of the 20th century. It was dissolved at the outbreak of World War I as its constituent batteries were posted to other formations.

Post-war, the brigade was reformed, serving in the UK, Egypt and India before being redesignated as 1st Regiment, RHA in May 1938 at Aldershot.

The brigade had an earlier incarnation as A Brigade, RHA, formed from the Horse Brigade, Royal Artillery in 1864 before being broken up in 1889.

== History ==
=== A Brigade, RHA ===
Royal Horse Artillery brigades did not exist as an organizational or operational grouping of batteries until 1 July 1859 when the Horse Brigade, Royal Artillery was formed. It commanded all the existing horse artillery batteries of the Royal Artillery: (Note: Note that there was no J Battery at this time.)

- A Battery, Horse Brigade, Royal Artillery (Note: Formed as A Troop, Horse Artillery on 1 February 1793, later A Battery, RHA.) at Aldershot
- B Battery, Horse Brigade, Royal Artillery (Note: Formed as B Troop, Horse Artillery on 1 February 1793, disbanded 28 March 1819. Reformed 9 May 1855 as the Half Troop, Horse Artillery, later B Battery, RHA.) at Woolwich
- C Battery, Horse Brigade, Royal Artillery (Note: Formed as C Troop, Horse Artillery on 1 November 1793, later C Battery, RHA.) at Cahir
- D Battery, Horse Brigade, Royal Artillery (Note: Formed as E Troop, Horse Artillery on 1 November 1794, later E Battery, RHA.) in Bombay
- E Battery, Horse Brigade, Royal Artillery (Note: Formed as F Troop, Horse Artillery on 1 November 1794, later D Battery, RHA.) in Bengal
- F Battery, Horse Brigade, Royal Artillery (Note: Formed as G Troop, Horse Artillery on 1 September 1801, later G Battery, RHA.) in Bengal
- G Battery, Horse Brigade, Royal Artillery (Note: Formed as H Troop, Horse Artillery in June 1804, later H Battery, RHA.) at Portobello Barracks, Dublin
- H Battery, Horse Brigade, Royal Artillery (Note: Formed as I Troop, Horse Artillery on 1 February 1802, later I Battery, RHA.) in Madras
- I Battery, Horse Brigade, Royal Artillery (Note: Formed as The Rocket Brigade, Horse Artillery on 7 June 1813, later O Battery, RHA.) at Woolwich
- K Battery, Horse Brigade, Royal Artillery (Note: Formed as K Troop, Horse Artillery on 1 February 1805, disbanded 31 July 1816. Reformed 1 December 1857 as K Troop, considered the forerunner of AA Battery, RHA.) at Aldershot

As a result of the Indian Rebellion of 1857, the British Crown took direct control of India from the East India Company on 1 November 1858 under the provisions of the Government of India Act 1858. The Presidency armies transferred to the direct authority of the British Crown and its European units were transferred to the British Army. Henceforth artillery, the mutineers most effective arm, was to be the sole preserve of the British Army (with the exception of certain Mountain Artillery batteries). On 19 February 1862, the Bengal, Bombay and Madras Horse Artilleries transferred to the Royal Artillery as its 2nd to 5th Horse Brigades. (Note: The original Horse Brigade Royal Artillery formed 1st Horse Brigade RA, the 1st Brigade Bengal Horse Artillery became 2nd Horse Brigade RA, the Madras Horse Artillery became 3rd Horse Brigade RA, the Bombay Horse Artillery became 4th Horse Brigade RA and the 2nd Brigade Bengal Horse Artillery became 5th Horse Brigade RA. The 3rd Brigade Bengal Horse Artillery was split between 2nd and 5th Horse Brigades RA. These brigades performed an administrative, rather than tactical, role.)

The 1st Brigade with 10 batteries was much larger than the other four (with four to seven batteries each). A reorganization of the Horse Artillery on 13 April 1864 saw 1st Brigade split as A Horse Brigade, Royal Artillery and B Brigade, 2nd Brigade become C Brigade, 3rd become D Brigade, 4th become E Brigade, and 5th become F Brigade. As battery designations were tied to the brigade the battery was assigned to, the batteries were also redesignated. A Horse Brigade, RA comprised:

- A Battery, A Horse Brigade (A/A) - formerly A Battery at Curragh
- B Battery, A Horse Brigade (B/A) - formerly B Battery at Dorchester
- C Battery, A Horse Brigade (C/A) - formerly C Battery at Woolwich
- D Battery, A Horse Brigade (D/A) - formerly G Battery at Woolwich
- E Battery, A Horse Brigade (E/A) - formerly K Battery at Dublin

From 1866, the term "Royal Horse Artillery" appeared in Army List hence the brigade was designated A Brigade, Royal Horse Artillery from about this time. Another reorganization on 14 April 1877 saw the number of brigades reduced to three (of 10 batteries each). A Brigade absorbed the batteries of the old B Brigade (which was reformed with the batteries of the old C and D Brigades).

The number of brigades was further reduced to two (of 13 batteries each) in 1882. C Brigade was broken up on 1 April 1882 and its batteries transferred to A and B Brigades. The brigade system was finally abolished in 1889. Henceforth, batteries were designated in a single alphabetical sequence in order of seniority from date of formation.

=== I Brigade, RHA ===
==== First formation ====
The brigade system was revived in 1901. Each brigade now commanded just two batteries and a small staff (a Lieutenant-Colonel in command, an adjutant and a brigade sergeant major). Initially, batteries were not assigned to brigades in any particular order, but in 1906, at the insistence of Edward VII, brigades were redesignated so that batteries were roughly in order of seniority (hence I Brigade commanded A Battery and B Battery).

I Brigade, RHA was formed on 1 March 1901 as the V Brigade-Division, RHA with A Battery and BB Battery. (Note: From 1 July 1889, RHA batteries were lettered in a single alphabetical sequence in order of seniority from date of formation. When more than 26 batteries were needed, double letters were used, AA, BB, etc.) In 1903 it was redesignated as V Brigade, RHA and was stationed at Dorchester. On 1 October 1906, it was redesignated as I Brigade, RHA. On 8 May 1913, BB Battery was disbanded. It was replaced on 1 August with Z Battery (from XIV Brigade, RHA) but was in turn disbanded on 24 December. It was replaced by B Battery (from II Brigade, RHA). (Note: Clarke says B Battery was assigned to I Brigade from 1911 and Z Battery was in II Brigade when disbanded.)

By the time World War I broke out, the brigade was in Ambala, India assigned to 3rd (Lahore) Division. On mobilization, A Battery was assigned to the newly formed I Indian Brigade, RHA with 1st Indian Cavalry Division (attached to 3rd (Ambala) Cavalry Brigade) and sailed for the Western Front in October 1914. B Battery also sailed for the United Kingdom in 1914. In January 1915, it joined XV Brigade, RHA at Leamington and was assigned to 29th Division. With the departure of its batteries, the brigade HQ was dissolved.

==== Second formation ====
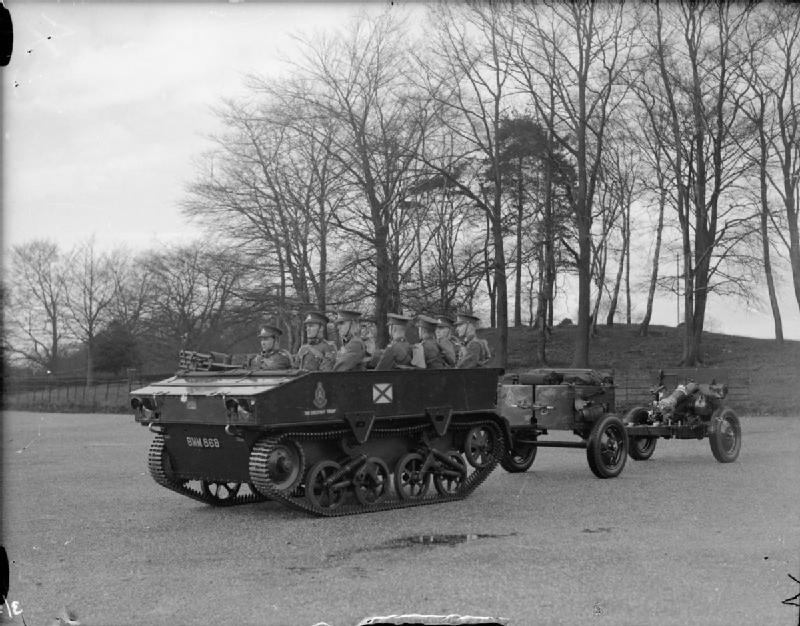
Vickers Light Dragon Mark II tractor towing a 3.7 inch howitzer on Carriage Mk IV and limber of A Battery (The Chestnut Troop) Royal Horse Artillery.

Early in 1919, I Brigade, RHA was reformed at Woolwich and Bordon with

- A Battery, RHA from XVI Brigade, RHA in Germany in May 1919
- B Battery, RHA from XV Brigade, RHA in Germany in April 1919
- M Battery, RHA from Risalpur, India in March 1919

On 20 November 1919 A Battery absorbed Y Battery, on 7 January 1920 B Battery absorbed Z Battery and on 11 February 1920 M Battery absorbed AA Battery, all of VIII Brigade, RHA. Finally, on 14 February 1920 the Headquarters of VIII Brigade was absorbed into the HQ of I Brigade.

By March 1920, the brigade was overseas again: A Battery was in Mesopotamia, B Battery in Palestine and M Battery (with the brigade HQ) was in Egypt. In October 1923 it returned to Exeter (A Battery at Trowbridge) and in November 1926 was at Aldershot where O Battery, RHA replaced M Battery. In November 1929 it was at Newport (B Battery at Trowbridge) before moving to Abbassia, Egypt in October 1931.

A Battery was the first Royal Horse Artillery battery to be mechanized. In 1934 it replaced its horses and 13 pounders with 3.7" Howitzers towed by Light Dragon gun tractors. By October 1937, the whole brigade was mechanized, and stationed at Aldershot.

=== 1st Regiment, RHA ===
In 1938, field artillery brigades were reorganized as two 12-gun batteries. As a result, the existing 6-gun batteries were linked in pairs. On 11 May, A Battery and E Battery (from Sialkot, India) were linked as A/E Battery, RHA and B Battery and O Battery were linked as B/O Battery, RHA.

With effect from May 1938, brigades were redesignated as regiments. On 11 May, I Brigade became 1st Regiment, RHA.

== Bibliography ==
- Becke, Major A.F. (1935). Order of Battle of Divisions Part 1. The Regular British Divisions. London: His Majesty's Stationery Office. OCLC 493146210.
- Clarke, W.G. (1993). Horse Gunners: The Royal Horse Artillery, 200 Years of Panache and Professionalism. Woolwich: The Royal Artillery Institution. ISBN 09520762-0-9.
- Frederick, J.B.M. (1984). Lineage Book of British Land Forces 1660-1978. Wakefield, Yorkshire: Microform Academic Publishers. ISBN 1-85117-009-X.
- Perry, F.W. (1993). Order of Battle of Divisions Part 5B. Indian Army Divisions. Newport, Gwent: Ray Westlake Military Books. ISBN 1-871167-23-X.
