= 2nd Regiment Royal Horse Artillery =

Former horse artillery regiment of the British Army

B Brigade, RHA II Brigade, RHA 2nd Regiment, RHA 2nd Field Regiment RA 2nd (Airportable) Regiment, RA 2nd (Light) Regiment, RA 2nd (Support) Regiment, RA
- Active: 13 April 1864 – 1 July 1889; 1 March 1901 – September 1914; October 1919 – 1 February 1958; February 1958 – 1993
- Country: United Kingdom
- Branch: British Army
- Type: Artillery
- Size: Battalion
- Engagements: Second World War Battle of France Battle of Greece Western Desert campaign Tunisia campaign Italian campaign

2nd Regiment Royal Horse Artillery was a regiment of the Royal Horse Artillery that served in the Second World War. It saw action in France, Greece, North Africa and Italy. It was redesignated as 2nd Field Regiment, Royal Artillery in 1958.

The regiment had an earlier incarnation as B Brigade, RHA, formed from the Horse Brigade, Royal Artillery in 1864 before being broken up in 1889. It was reestablished in 1901 as II Brigade, (Note: The basic organic unit of the Royal Artillery was, and is, the Battery. When grouped together they formed brigades, in the same way that infantry battalions or cavalry regiments were grouped together in brigades. At the outbreak of the First World War, a field artillery brigade of headquarters (4 officers, 37 other ranks), three batteries (5 and 193 each), and a brigade ammunition column (4 and 154) had a total strength just under 800 so was broadly comparable to an infantry battalion (just over 1,000) or a cavalry regiment (about 550). Like an infantry battalion, an artillery brigade was usually commanded by a Lieutenant-Colonel. Artillery brigades were redesignated as regiments in 1938.) RHA but was broken up at the outbreak of the First World War as its constituent battery was posted away.

== History ==
=== B Brigade, RHA ===
Royal Horse Artillery brigades did not exist as an organizational or operational grouping of batteries until 1 July 1859 when the Horse Brigade, Royal Artillery was formed.

As a result of the Indian Rebellion of 1857, the British Crown took direct control of India from the East India Company on 1 November 1858 under the provisions of the Government of India Act 1858. The Presidency armies transferred to the direct authority of the British Crown and its European units were transferred to the British Army. Henceforth artillery, the mutineers most effective arm, was to be the sole preserve of the British Army (with the exception of certain Mountain Artillery batteries). On 19 February 1862, the Bengal, Bombay and Madras Horse Artilleries transferred to the Royal Artillery as its 2nd to 5th Horse Brigades. (Note: The original Horse Brigade Royal Artillery formed 1st Horse Brigade RA, the 1st Brigade Bengal Horse Artillery became 2nd Horse Brigade RA, the Madras Horse Artillery became 3rd Horse Brigade RA, the Bombay Horse Artillery became 4th Horse Brigade RA and the 2nd Brigade Bengal Horse Artillery became 5th Horse Brigade RA. The 3rd Brigade Bengal Horse Artillery was split between 2nd and 5th Horse Brigades RA. These brigades performed an administrative, rather than tactical, role.)

The 1st Brigade with 10 batteries was much larger than the other four (with four to seven batteries each). A reorganization of the Horse Artillery on 13 April 1864 saw 1st Brigade split as A and B Horse Brigade, Royal Artillery, 2nd Brigade become C Brigade, 3rd become D Brigade, 4th become E Brigade, and 5th become F Brigade. As battery designations were tied to the brigade the battery was assigned to, the batteries were also redesignated. B Horse Brigade, RA comprised:

- A Battery, B Horse Brigade (A/B) - formerly D Battery (Note: Formed as E Troop, Horse Artillery on 1 November 1794, later E Battery, RHA.) at Aldershot
- B Battery, B Horse Brigade (B/B) - formerly E Battery (Note: Formed as F Troop, Horse Artillery on 1 November 1794, later D Battery, RHA.) at Woolwich
- C Battery, B Horse Brigade (C/B) - formerly F Battery (Note: Formed as G Troop, Horse Artillery on 1 September 1801, later G Battery, RHA.) at Woolwich
- D Battery, B Horse Brigade (D/B) - formerly H Battery (Note: Formed as I Troop, Horse Artillery on 1 February 1805, later I Battery, RHA.) at Aldershot
- E Battery, B Horse Brigade (E/B) - formerly I Battery (Note: Formed as The Rocket Brigade, Horse Artillery on 7 June 1813, later O Battery, RHA.) at Newbridge

From 1866, the term "Royal Horse Artillery" appeared in Army List hence the brigade was designated B Brigade, Royal Horse Artillery from about this time. Another reorganization on 14 April 1877 saw the number of brigades reduced to three (of 10 batteries each). B Brigade was extensively reorganized: its batteries were transferred to the new A Brigade and it was reformed with the batteries of the old C and D Brigades.

The number of brigades was further reduced to two (of 13 batteries each) in 1882. C Brigade was broken up on 1 April 1882 and it batteries transferred to A and B Brigades. The brigade system was finally abolished in 1889. Henceforth, batteries were designated in a single alphabetical sequence in order of seniority from date of formation.

=== II Brigade, RHA ===
==== First formation ====
The brigade system was revived in 1901. Each brigade now commanded just two batteries and a small staff (a Lieutenant-Colonel in command, an adjutant and a brigade sergeant major). Initially, batteries were not assigned to brigades in any particular order, but in 1906, at the insistence of Edward VII, brigades were redesignated so that batteries were roughly in order of seniority (hence I Brigade commanded A Battery and B Battery).

II Brigade, RHA was formed on 1 March 1901 as the VI Brigade-Division, RHA with B Battery and C Battery. In 1903 it was redesignated as VI Brigade, RHA and was stationed at Ipswich. On 1 October 1906, it was redesignated as II Brigade, RHA.

By the time the First World War broke out, B Battery had been transferred to I Brigade, leaving just C Battery at Canterbury, attached to 4th Cavalry Brigade. In September 1914, C Battery transferred to XIV Brigade which joined 7th Division at Lyndhurst on formation. The brigade HQ was dissolved.

==== Second formation ====
By October 1919, II Brigade, RHA was reformed at Bordon with

- C Battery, RHA from IV Brigade, RHA in Belgium in July 1919
- H Battery, RHA from VII Brigade, RHA in Germany in early 1919
- K Battery, RHA also from IV Brigade, RHA

Between December 1919 and March 1920 it moved to India, where C Battery was stationed at Meerut, H Battery at Sialkot and K Battery at Risalpur. In November 1926, the brigade moved to Abbassia, Egypt (with L Battery instead of H Battery), before returning to Newport in December 1931 (L Battery at Trowbridge). By December 1936, I Battery replaced K Battery, and in May 1938 N Battery replaced C Battery. By now the brigade commanded I, L and N batteries.

=== 2nd Regiment, RHA ===
==== Formed ====
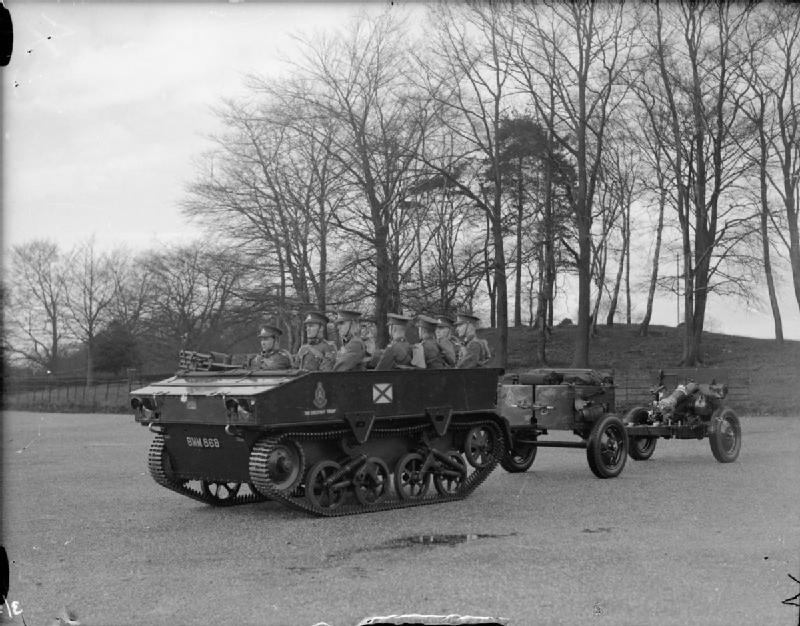
Vickers Light Dragon Mark II tractor towing a 3.7-inch howitzer on Carriage Mk IV and limber.

In 1938, field artillery brigades were reorganized as two 12-gun batteries. Rather than disband existing batteries, they were instead linked in pairs. On 11 May, H Battery (from 8th Field Brigade) and I Battery were linked as H/I Battery, RHA and L Battery and N were linked as L/N Battery, RHA. With effect from May 1938, brigades were redesignated as regiments and II Brigade became 2nd Regiment RHA on 21 May. The regiment was mechanized in August 1939 replacing its horses and 13 pounders with 3.7" Howitzers towed by Vickers Light Dragon gun tractors.

==== Second World War ====
At the outbreak of the Second World War, 2nd RHA was assigned to 1st Support Group of the 1st Armoured Division. In October 1939, it moved to France where it was placed under direct command of General Headquarters, BEF. It was still serving with the BEF when the Battle of France broke out in May 1940. After evacuation from the continent, it was assigned to 2nd Support Group of 2nd Armoured Division, but did not join until July 1940. It was transferred to Egypt with the division.

From January to May 1941, it was assigned to 1st Armoured Brigade and took part in the Battle of Greece. On return to Egypt, it came under direct command of the Middle East Forces (MEF). At the end of January 1942 it rejoined 1st Support Group briefly.

The experience of the BEF in 1940 showed the limitations of having artillery regiments formed with two 12-gun batteries: field regiments were intended to support an infantry brigade of three battalions (or armoured brigade of three regiments). This could not be managed without severe disruption to the regiment. As a result, field regiments were reorganised into three 8-gun batteries. Surprisingly, it was not until April 1942 that its batteries were unlinked. H/I once again formed H and I batteries and L/N reformed as L and N batteries. N Battery returned to the UK to join 6th Regiment, Royal Horse Artillery. At this point the regiment was armed with twenty four 25 pounders.

From 21 April 1942, the regiment served with 22nd Guards Brigade under command of 2nd South African Division in the Battle of Gazala. On 25 June it transferred to 22nd Armoured Brigade and took part in the Battle of Mersa Matruh and the Defence of the El Alamein Line.

On 24 August 1942 it joined 1st Armoured Division. It served with this division throughout the rest of the Western Desert campaign and the Tunisia campaign, in particular, the battles of El Alamein, Tebaga Gap, Akarit, El Kourzia and Tunis. It moved with the division to Italy in May 1944, fighting at the Battle of Coriano on the Gothic Line. It left 1st Armoured Division on 26 September 1944 and came under direct command of Headquarters, Allied Armies in Italy where it remained until May 1945.

==== Post-war ====
In 1948, H Battery transferred to 6th Field Regiment, Royal Artillery and O Battery, RHA joined in its place. I Battery transferred to 4th Regiment, RHA just before conversion to a field artillery regiment, with N Battery replacing it.

==== Conversion to a field artillery regiment ====
The regiment was re-formed as 2nd Field Regiment Royal Artillery by renaming 2nd Regiment Royal Horse Artillery and subordinating it to 12th Infantry Brigade, on 1 February 1958. At that time it included L Field Battery, N Field Battery and O Field Battery and it saw active service later that year during the Malayan Emergency.

In November 1961 the regiment became 2nd (Airportable) Regiment, Royal Artillery and moved to Colchester and in March 1964 it converted to Ordnance QF 25-pounder as 2nd (Light) Regiment, Royal Artillery. Then in 1965 it moved to Münster and became 2nd Field Regiment Royal Artillery. In 1971 it moved to Hemer with Abbot guns as part of 2nd Division and in 1977 it transferred to Dortmund with Abbots as part of 3rd Armoured Division.

It returned home to Roberts Barracks at Larkhill as 2nd (Support) Regiment, Royal Artillery in September 1979. In March 1982 it became 2nd (Field) Regiment, Royal Artillery and in April 1982, as part of a move to Münster with M109's, it joined 4th Armoured Division. It became part of 3rd Armoured Division in 1988 and it deployed to the Persian Gulf as part of Operation Granby between 1991 and 1992. The regiment was finally disbanded in 1993 as a result of the Options for Change and the drawdown from Germany.

== Lineage ==
1864–1889: B Brigade, Royal Horse Artillery

1901–1903: IV Brigade–Division, Royal Horse Artillery

1903–1906: IV Brigade, Royal Horse Artillery

1906–1914: II Brigade, Royal Horse Artillery

1919–1938: II Brigade, Royal Horse Artillery

1938–1958: 2nd Regiment, Royal Horse Artillery

1958–1993: 2nd Regiment, Royal Artillery

== Bibliography ==
- Becke, Major A.F. (1989). Order of Battle of Divisions Part 1. History of the Great War. Ray Westlake Military Books. ISBN 1-871167-09-4.
- Clarke, W.G. (1993). Horse Gunners: The Royal Horse Artillery, 200 Years of Panache and Professionalism. Woolwich: The Royal Artillery Institution. ISBN 09520762-0-9.
- Forty, George (1998). British Army Handbook 1939-1945. Stroud, Gloucestershire: Sutton Publishing Limited. ISBN 0-7509-1403-3.
- Frederick, J.B.M. (1984). Lineage Book of British Land Forces 1660-1978. Wakefield, Yorkshire: Microform Academic Publishers. ISBN 1-85117-009-X.
- Joslen, Lt-Col H.F. (1990) [1st. Pub. HMSO:1960]. Orders of Battle, Second World War, 1939–1945. London: London Stamp Exchange. ISBN 0-948130-03-2.
- Watson, G; Rinaldi, R (2005). The British Army in Germany: An Organizational History 1947-2004. Tiger Lily Publications. ISBN 0-9720296-9-9.
