= 1st Brigade, Royal Field Artillery =

I Brigade, Royal Field Artillery was a brigade (Note: The basic organic unit of the Royal Artillery was, and is, the Battery. When grouped together they formed brigades, in the same way that infantry battalions or cavalry regiments were grouped together in brigades. At the outbreak of World War I, a field artillery brigade of headquarters (4 officers, 37 other ranks), three batteries (5 and 193 each), and a brigade ammunition column (4 and 154) had a total strength just under 800 so was broadly comparable to an infantry battalion (just over 1,000) or a cavalry regiment (about 550). Like an infantry battalion, an artillery brigade was usually commanded by a Lieutenant-Colonel. Artillery brigades were redesignated as regiments in 1938.) of the Royal Field Artillery which served in the First World War.

It was composed of 13th, 67th and 69th Batteries, and on mobilisation in August 1914 was stationed at Edinburgh under Scottish Command. It was attached to 27th Infantry Division in October, when it was reformed to consist of 98th, 132nd and 133rd Batteries. In November, these were joined by 11th Battery from 15th Brigade, and in July 1916 133rd Battery was transferred to 129th Brigade and replaced with B/CXXIX (Howitzer) Battery, renamed D/I Battery. In December 1916, 98th Battery was disbanded, leaving a three-battery establishment.

It saw service with 27th Division throughout the war.
