= J (Sidi Rezegh) Battery Royal Horse Artillery =

British Army artillery battery

J Battery Royal Horse Artillery
- Active: 4 April 1805 – present
- Country: United Kingdom
- Allegiance: Hon East India Coy (till 1858); United Kingdom (post 1858)
- Branch: British Army
- Type: Artillery
- Role: Close Support/Tactical Air Control Party
- Size: Battery
- Part of: 3rd Regiment Royal Horse Artillery
- Location: Hohne, Germany
- Anniversaries: Sidi Rezegh Day 21 November
- Battle honours: Ubique

J (Sidi Rezegh) Battery Royal Horse Artillery are a Close Support Battery of 3rd Regiment Royal Horse Artillery. They were currently based in Caen Barracks in Hohne, Germany.

== History ==
=== Madras Horse Artillery ===
J Battery was originally raised in India on 4 April 1805 as The Troop of Madras Horse Artillery, part of the Madras Army of the Honourable East India Company. With the formation of another unit on 6 January 1806 (the 2nd Half Squadron, Madras Horse Artillery), it was renamed as the 1st Half Squadron, Madras Horse Artillery and 1st Troop, Madras Horse Artillery with the formation of a third troop (later M Battery, Royal Horse Artillery) on 25 January 1809. By 5 August 1825, the Madras Horse Artillery had grown to 8 batteries and so was reorganized as two brigades; the battery was redesignated as A Troop, 1st Brigade, Madras Horse Artillery. The last redesignation under the Madras Army (as A Troop, Madras Horse Artillery) came on 4 January 1831 as the brigade system was discontinued and the Madras Horse Artillery shrank to 6 batteries in a single sequence (A to F Troops).

As a result of the Indian Rebellion of 1857, the British Crown took direct control of India from the East India Company on 1 November 1858 under the provisions of the Government of India Act 1858. The Presidency armies transferred to the direct authority of the British Crown and its European units were transferred to the British Army. Henceforth artillery, the mutineers most effective arm, was to be the sole preserve of the British Army (with the exception of certain Mountain Artillery batteries). On 19 February 1862, the Madras Horse Artillery transferred to the Royal Artillery as its 3rd Horse Brigade (Note: The original Horse Brigade Royal Artillery formed 1st Horse Brigade RA, the 1st Brigade Bengal Horse Artillery became 2nd Horse Brigade RA, the Madras Horse Artillery became 3rd Horse Brigade RA, the Bombay Horse Artillery became 4th Horse Brigade RA and the 2nd Brigade Bengal Horse Artillery became 5th Horse Brigade RA. The 3rd Brigade Bengal Horse Artillery was split between 2nd and 5th Horse Brigades RA. These brigades performed an administrative, rather than tactical, role.) and A Troop became A Battery, 3rd Horse Brigade, RA.

The battery was in South Africa during the Second Boer War (1899-1902). Following the end of the war, 160 officers and men left Point Natal for India on the SS Ionian in October 1902, and after arrival in Bombay, was stationed in Meerut, Bengal Presidency.

=== World War I ===
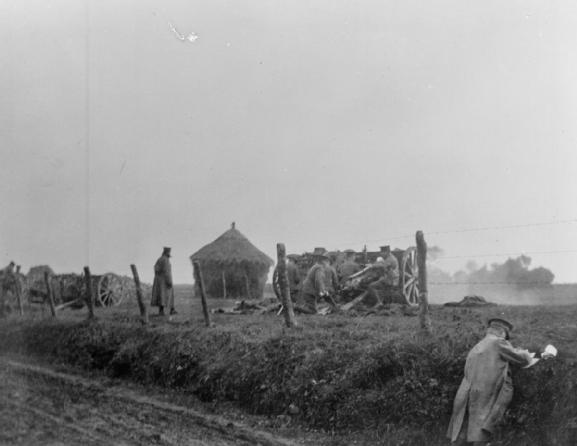
J Battery Royal Horse Artillery in action near the Messines Ridge, October 1914.

=== World War II ===
The battery was given the Honour title "Sidi Rezegh" for its action against a German attack during Operation Crusader, during which A Troop commander George Ward Gunn earned the Victoria Cross, and the battery commander Major Bernard Pinney was recommended for the VC.

=== Post war ===
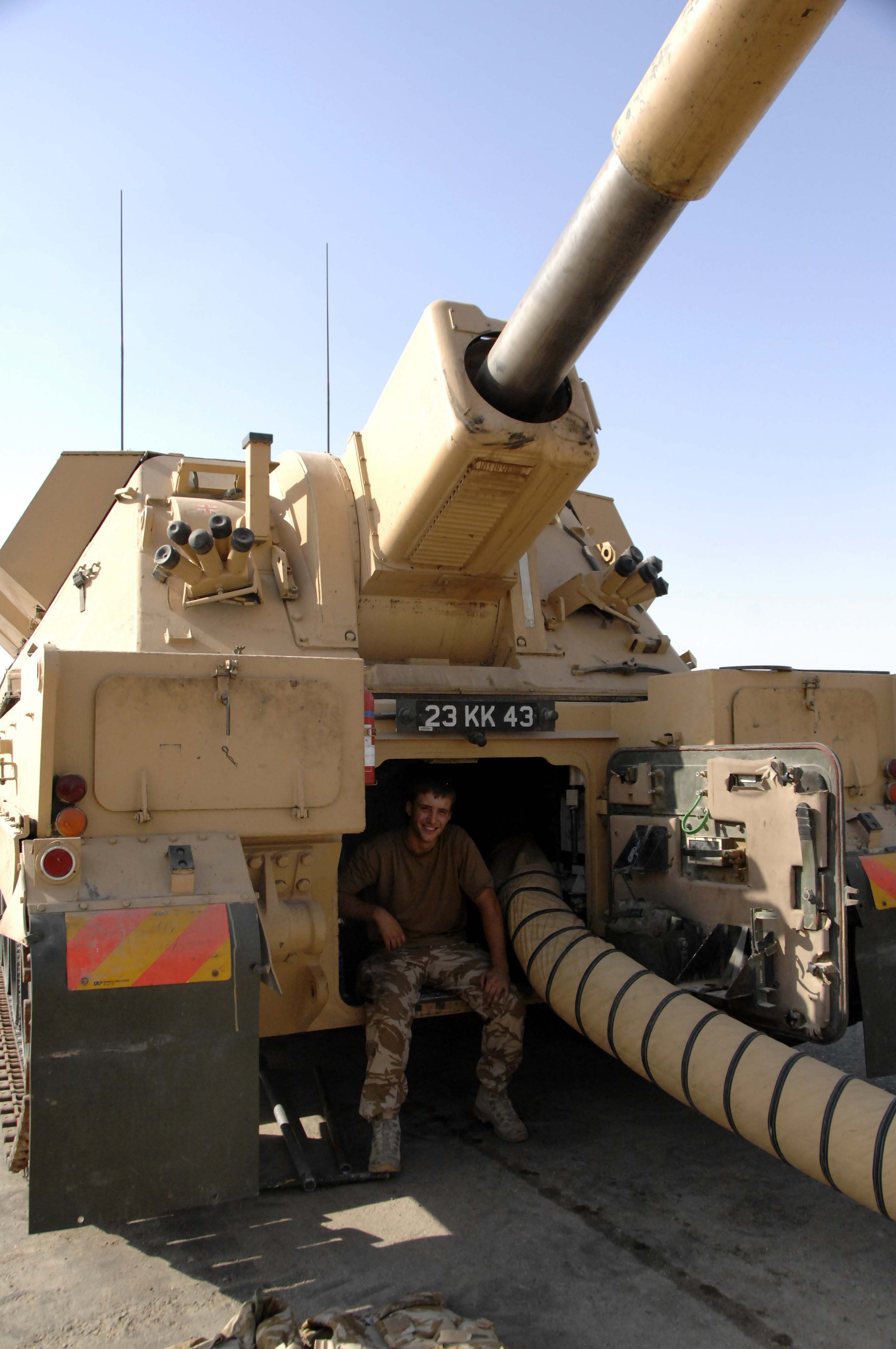
J Battery, 3rd Regiment, Royal Horse Artillery fire rounds to calibrate their AS-90 155 mm self-propelled guns in Basra, Iraq, 28 August 2008.

== See also ==
- British Army
- Royal Artillery
- Royal Horse Artillery
- List of Royal Artillery Batteries
- Madras Horse Artillery Batteries

== Bibliography ==
- Becke, Archibald F. (1935). Order of Battle of Divisions Part 1–The Regular British Divisions. London: HMSO. OCLC 4405016.
- Clarke, W.G. (1993). Horse Gunners: The Royal Horse Artillery, 200 Years of Panache and Professionalism. Woolwich: The Royal Artillery Institution. ISBN 09520762-0-9.
- Frederick, J.B.M. (1984). Lineage Book of British Land Forces 1660-1978. Wakefield, Yorkshire: Microform Academic Publishers. ISBN 1-85117-009-X.
- Order of Battle of the British Armies in France, November 11th, 1918. France: General Staff, GHQ. 1918.
