= Q (Sanna's Post) Battery Royal Artillery =

British Army artillery battery

Q (Sanna's Post) Battery Royal Horse Artillery Q (Sanna's Post) Battery Royal Artillery
- Active: 1 March 1824 – present
- Country: United Kingdom
- Allegiance: Hon East India Coy (till 1858); United Kingdom (post 1858)
- Branch: British Army
- Type: Artillery
- Role: Headquarters
- Size: Battery
- Part of: 5th Regiment Royal Artillery
- Location: Catterick Garrison
- Anniversaries: Sanna's Post Day – 31 March
- Decorations: Sanna's Post
- Battle honours: Ubique

Commanders
- Notable commanders: Edmund Phipps-Hornby VC

Q (Sanna's Post) Battery is the Headquarters Battery of 5th Regiment Royal Artillery in the Royal Artillery. It currently serves as the Headquarters Battery for the British Army's Surveillance and Target Acquisition regiment.

The name Sanna's Post was taken following the actions of the battery in an engagement during the Second Boer War.

== Battery history ==
Q Battery, Royal Horse Artillery was originally raised in Poona, India on 1 March 1824 as 3rd Troop, Bombay Horse Artillery, part of the Bombay Presidency Army of the Honourable East India Company. Between 1838 and 1857 the troop saw action in the First Anglo-Afghan War, the First Anglo-Sikh War, the Second Anglo-Sikh War, and the Anglo-Persian War. In 1858 the battery saw service during the Indian mutiny.

On 19 February 1862, the Bombay Horse Artillery transferred to the Royal Artillery, specifically as its 4th Horse Brigade. and 3rd Troop became C Battery, 4th Horse Brigade, RA. A reorganisation of artillery regiments on 13 April 1864 saw 1st Brigade split as A and B Brigades, 2nd Brigade become C Brigade, 3rd become D, 4th become E, and 5th become F Horse Brigade, Royal Artillery. As the battery's designation was tied to the brigade it was assigned to, it was redesignated on the same date as C Battery, E Horse Brigade, RA. From 1866, the term "Royal Horse Artillery" appeared in Army List hence the battery was designated C Battery, E Brigade, RHA from about this time. Between 1864 and 1889 the battery's title changed a further five times. In 1889 the battery assumed the title of Q Battery Royal Artillery.

The battery next saw service in the Boer war between 1899 and 1901. On 31 March 1900 the battery assisted the majority of General Broadwater's force from a Boer ambush at Koorn Spruit, near Sanna's Post. In 1926, the battery was granted the honour title "Sanna's Post". During the First World War the battery saw continuous action on the western front. At the end of the Great War the battery's name changed again twice before being renamed Q Battery Royal Field Artillery in 1924.

== See also ==
- British Army
- Royal Artillery
- Royal Horse Artillery
- List of Royal Artillery Batteries
- Bombay Horse Artillery Batteries

== Bibliography ==
- Becke, Archibald F. (1935). Order of Battle of Divisions Part 1–The Regular British Divisions. London: HMSO. OCLC 4405016.
- Clarke, W.G. (1993). Horse Gunners: The Royal Horse Artillery, 200 Years of Panache and Professionalism. Woolwich: The Royal Artillery Institution. ISBN 09520762-0-9.
- Frederick, J.B.M. (1984). Lineage Book of British Land Forces 1660–1978. Wakefield, Yorkshire: Microform Academic Publishers. ISBN 1-85117-009-X.
- Order of Battle of the British Armies in France, November 11th, 1918. France: General Staff, GHQ. 1918.
