= A Battery (The Chestnut Troop) Royal Horse Artillery =

British Army artillery battery

- Active: 1 February 1793 – present
- Country: United Kingdom
- Branch: British Army
- Type: Artillery
- Size: Battery
- Part of: 1st Regiment Royal Horse Artillery
- Anniversaries: Formation Day (1793) 1 February
- Equipment: AS-90
- Battle honours: Ubique

Commanders
- Notable commanders: Hew Dalrymple Ross; Anthony Clarke

A Battery (The Chestnut Troop) Royal Horse Artillery is the senior Battery in the British Army's Royal Artillery and is part of 1st Regiment Royal Horse Artillery. The Chestnut Troop is currently based in Purvis Lines at Larkhill Barracks. The unit is currently equipped as a Close Support Artillery Battery, with the AS-90 Self-propelled gun.

== History ==
=== Formation and early years ===
A Troop, Royal Horse Artillery was raised as The Chestnut Troop at Woolwich on 1 February 1793. In 1798 the troop saw action in the Irish Rebellion and in 1799 it fought in the Netherlands. In 1806, Hew Dalrymple Ross assumed command of the unit which he led during campaigns in Spain, Portugal and France. Ross was later knighted and promoted to field marshal. After 1809, it fought in the Peninsular War and at the Battle of Waterloo. Between 1855 and 1856 it fought in the Crimean War.

=== World War I ===
The outbreak of the First World War saw the unit, now enlarged to a battery, deployed to France in 1914. It served during all four years, firing its last round at Orrs on 4 November 1918.

=== Between the two World Wars ===
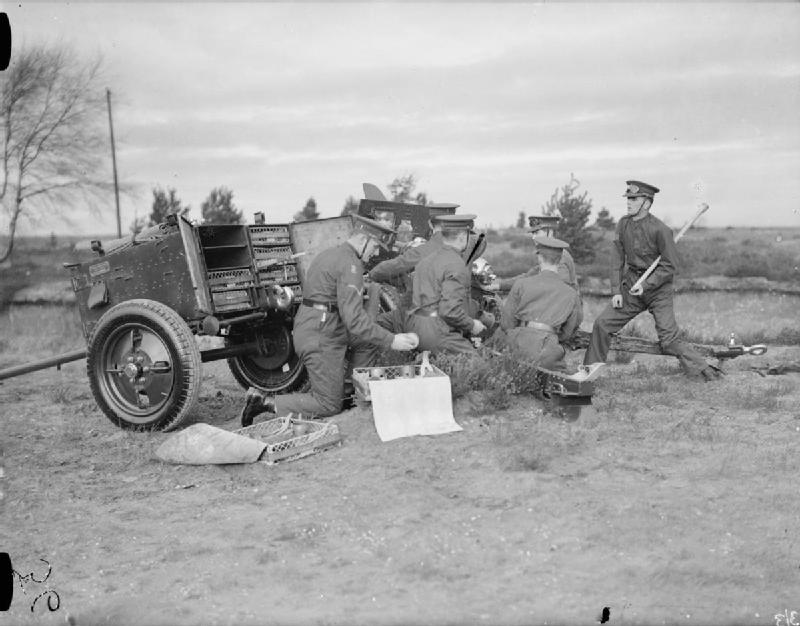
Training with a 3.7-inch mountain howitzer c. 1938

In 1919 the battery was deployed in North West Persia as part of the Norperforce. and, in 1921, it was deployed to Basra. In 1938, the battery became part of 1st Regiment Royal Horse Artillery.

=== World War II ===
The battery was deployed to France, serving with the British Expeditionery Force until the evacuation from Dunkirk. Later in 1940, the battery was sent to Egypt as part of the Desert Rats. In 1941, it fought as part of the Siege of Tobruk. The battery served continuously in the Western Desert especially in El Alamein in 1942. After El Alamein, elements of the battery were seconded to the newly formed "Long Range Desert Group" because of their intimate knowledge of the desert and survival skills. Afterwards, it was then re-equipped with 105mm SP guns before fighting in Italy for the rest of the World War. During the Italian Campaign, commander Anthony Clarke refused orders to bombard the town of Sansepolcro in order to preserve Piero della Francesca's fresco painting The Resurrection, having remembered Aldous Huxley's description of it as "the greatest picture in the world."

=== Post war ===
In the post-war period the battery served in Egypt, the United Kingdom and Germany. Most significantly, between 1965 and 1967 it was deployed to Aden. In the 1970s, the battery completed tours in Northern Ireland, and in 1990, the battery provided soldiers for a combined A/B/E Battery which fought in the Gulf War. In 1996, the battery served in Bosnia as a part of IFOR. In April 2004, the unit deployed to Basra as part of the 1 Cheshire Battlegroup, and was tasked with developing the Iraqi Police within the City, as part of Operation Telic 4. Later in 2007 the battery deployed to Basra on Operation Telic 10. In 2009 A Battery served in Sangin as part of 3 Rifles Battlegroup on Operation Herrick 11.

== See also ==
- British Army
- Royal Artillery
- Royal Horse Artillery
- List of Royal Artillery Batteries

== Bibliography ==
- Clarke, W.G. (1993). Horse Gunners: The Royal Horse Artillery, 200 Years of Panache and Professionalism. Woolwich: The Royal Artillery Institution. ISBN 09520762-0-9.
