= David Nelson =

David or Dave Nelson may refer to:

== Academia ==
- David Nelson (abolitionist) (1793–1844), founder of Marion College and Mission Institute, Presbyterian minister
- David Robert Nelson (born 1951), American physicist, professor of biophysics at Harvard University
- David L. Nelson (born 1956), American human geneticist
- David Nelson (mathematician) (born 1938), English mathematician

== Arts and entertainment ==
- Dave Nelson (trumpeter) (1905–1946), American jazz trumpeter
- David Nelson (musician) (born 1943), American guitarist
- David Nelson (actor) (1936–2011), American actor, director, and producer
- David Nelson, member of The Last Poets
- Dave Nelson, guitarist with Nektar
- Dave Nelson, character on the sitcom NewsRadio played by Dave Foley

== Law and politics ==
- David Aldrich Nelson (1932–2010), United States federal judge
- David Sutherland Nelson (1933–1998), United States federal judge
- David Nelson (Alaska politician) (born 1996), Alaska state representative
- David Nelson (Oklahoma politician), Oklahoma state representative
- David Nelson (Oregon politician) (born 1941), Oregon state senator
- David Nelson (Idaho politician), Idaho state senator
- David R. Nelson (politician) (born 1942), Massachusetts state representative
- David D. Nelson (born 1956), United States ambassador to Uruguay, 2009–2011
- David Nelson (Utah activist) (born 1962), American activist for the protection of equal rights for LGBT people

== Sports ==
- Dave Nelson (1944–2018), American baseball player and sportscaster
- Dave Nelson (Australian footballer) (1910–1986), Australian rules footballer
- Dave Nelson (basketball) (born 1956), American basketball player
- Dave Nelson (curler) (born 1974), American curler
- David M. Nelson (1920–1991), American football coach
- David Nelson (footballer) (1918–1988), Scottish professional footballer
- David Nelson (gamer) (born 1974), American electronic sports player
- David Nelson (hurdler) (born 1967), British athlete and medallist in athletics at the 1990 Commonwealth Games
- David Nelson (rugby league) (1962–2001), English rugby league footballer who played in the 1980s and 1990s
- David Nelson (running back) (born 1963), American football running back
- David Nelson (wide receiver) (born 1986), American football wide receiver

== Other ==
- David Nelson (botanical collector) (died 1789), British botanical collector, crew member of HMS Bounty
- David Nelson (VC) (1886–1918), Irish recipient of the Victoria Cross
- David Nelson (software developer) (born 1993), American software developer
- David Nelson, inventor of the current-feedback operational amplifier
- David Nelson (engineer), Australian Formula One engineer

== See also ==
- David Stergakos (David Nelson Stergakos, born 1956), Greek-American basketball player
