= 1st Cavalry Brigade (United Kingdom) =

- Active: 1815; 1899–1902; 1914–1919
- Country: United Kingdom
- Branch: British Army
- Type: Cavalry
- Size: Brigade
- Part of: 1st Cavalry Division (World War I)
- Engagements: Napoleonic Wars Battle of Waterloo Anglo-Egyptian War (1882); Second Boer War Battle of Paardeberg World War I Western Front

Commanders
- Notable commanders: Lord Edward Somerset; Baker Russell; John French, 1st Earl of Ypres; Julian Byng, 1st Viscount Byng of Vimy; Hew Dalrymple Fanshawe; Charles James Briggs; Horace Sewell

The 1st Cavalry Brigade was a brigade of the British Army. It served in the Napoleonic Wars (1st Household Cavalry Brigade), the Anglo-Egyptian War (1st (Heavy) Cavalry Brigade), the Boer War and in the First World War when it was assigned to the 1st Cavalry Division.

Prior to World War I the brigade was based at Aldershot in England and originally consisted of three cavalry regiments, and a Royal Engineers signal troop. After the declaration of war in August 1914, the brigade was deployed to the Western Front in France, where an artillery battery joined the brigade the following September and a Machine Gun Squadron in February 1916.

One of the brigade's early battles was the action at Néry on 1 September 1914 when, acting alone, the brigade defeated the German 4th Cavalry Division. As a result of this action three men from the artillery battery – Captain Edward Bradbury, Sergeant-Major George Dorrell and Sergeant David Nelson – were awarded the Victoria Cross.

== History ==
=== Napoleonic Wars ===
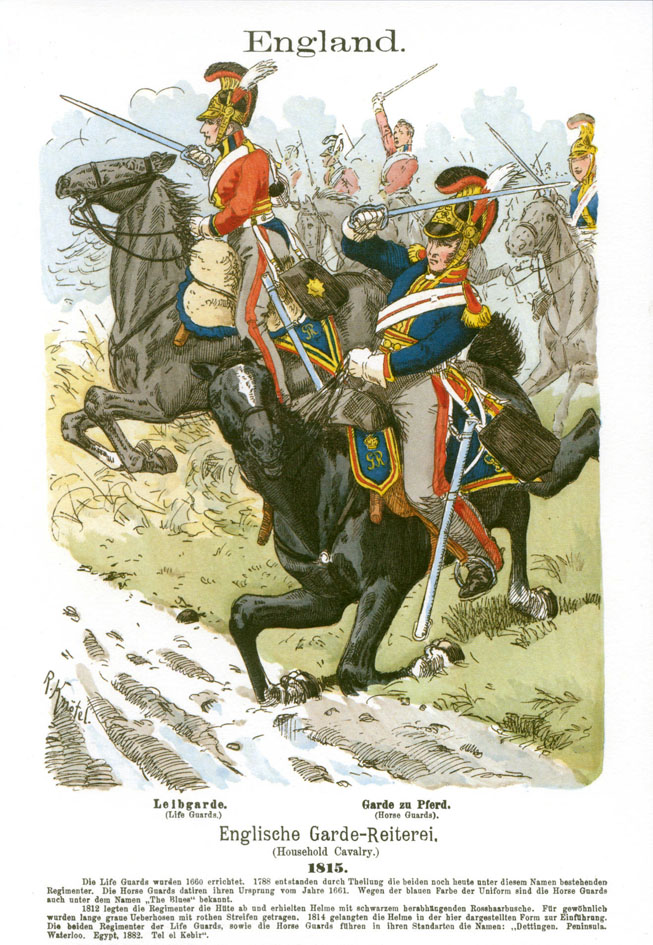
Life Guards (left) and Horse Guards (right) charging.

From June 1809, Wellington organized his cavalry into one, later two, cavalry divisions (1st and 2nd) for the Peninsular War. These performed a purely administrative, rather than tactical, role; the normal tactical headquarters were provided by brigades commanding two, later usually three, regiments. The cavalry brigades were named for the commanding officer, rather than numbered. (Note: This could be a source of confusion as brigades acquired new commanders, or they moved between brigades. For example, Fane's Brigade became De Grey's Brigade from 13 May 1810 when Henry Fane went to Estremadura; De Grey's Brigade was broken up 29 January 1812. On 20 May 1813, Fane took over Slade's Brigade; the second Fane's Brigade was unrelated to the original one although coincidentally, and to add to the potential confusion, the 3rd Dragoon Guards served in both.) For the Hundred Days Campaign, he numbered his British cavalry brigades in a single sequence, 1st to 7th. (Note: The British cavalry included five regiments of the King's German Legion.) The 1st Cavalry Brigade consisted of:

- 1st Life Guards
- 2nd Life Guards
- Royal Horse Guards
- 1st King's Dragoon Guards

As the majority of the brigade consisted of Household Cavalry regiments, it was known as the 1st (Household) Cavalry Brigade .

=== Anglo-Egyptian War ===
- Household Cavalry Composite Regiment (1 Squadron each from the 1st Life Guards, 2nd Life Guards and Royal Horse Guards)
- 4th Dragoon Guards
- 7th Dragoon Guards

=== Second Boer War ===
The brigade was reformed for the Second Boer War. During the Battle of Paardeberg, the brigade commanded:

- Household Cavalry Composite Regiment
- 10th Royal Hussars
- 12th Royal Lancers
- Q, T and U Batteries, Royal Horse Artillery

Following the end of the Second Boer War in 1902 the army was restructured, and the 1st Cavalry Brigade was established at Aldershot (South Cavalry Barracks) attached to the 1st Army Corps. Brigadier-General Henry Scobell was appointed in command from 1 April 1903.

=== First World War ===
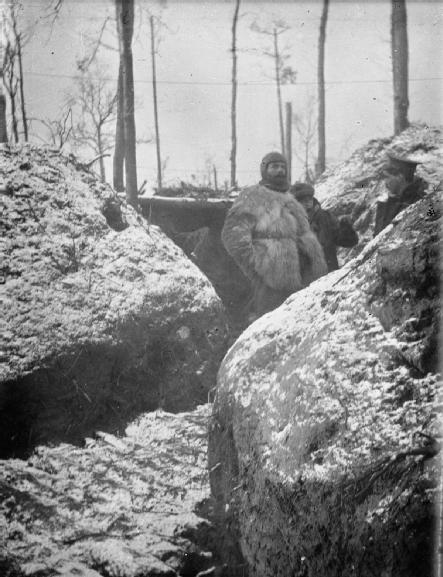
Men of the machine gun section of the 11th Hussars in the trenches at Zillebeke during the winter of 1914–1915.

- 2nd Dragoon Guards (Queen's Bays)
- 5th (Princess Charlotte of Wales's) Dragoon Guards
- 11th (Prince Albert's Own) Hussars
- 1st Signal Troop, Royal Engineers
- I Battery, Royal Horse Artillery from 17 September 1914
- 1st Cavalry Brigade Machine Gun Squadron Machine Gun Corps

==== Commanders ====
The commanders of the 1st Cavalry Brigade during the First World War were:

- Brigadier-General C. J. Briggs (At mobilization)
- Lieutenant-Colonel T. T. Pitman (7 May 1915 - acting)
- Brigadier-General E. Makins (15 May 1915)
- Brigadier-General H. S. Sewell (16 April 1918)

== See also ==
- Order of battle of the Waterloo Campaign
- British Army during World War I
- British Cavalry Corps order of battle 1914
- British cavalry during the First World War

== Bibliography ==
- Becke, Major A.F. (1998) [1st Pub. 1935]. Order of Battle of Divisions Part 1. The Regular British Divisions. London: His Majesty's Stationery Office. ISBN 1-871167-09-4.
- Clarke, W.G. (1993). Horse Gunners: The Royal Horse Artillery, 200 Years of Panache and Professionalism. Woolwich: The Royal Artillery Institution. ISBN 09520762-0-9.
- Haythornthwaite, Philip J. (1990). The Napoleonic Source Book. London: Guild Publishing.
- Reid, Stuart (2004). Wellington's Army in the Peninsula 1809–14. Volume 2 of Battle Orders Series. Oxford: Osprey Publishing. ISBN 1-84176-517-1.
- Smith, Digby (1998). The Greenhill Napoleonic Wars Data Book. London: Greenhill Books. ISBN 1-85367-276-9.
