= Affair of Néry =

1914 skirmish between the British Army and German Army

Battle of Néry
- Part of the Retreat from Mons
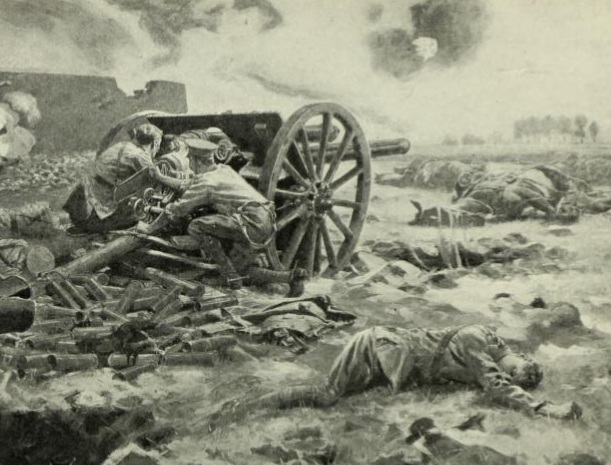
- An artist's impression of the last gun of L Battery in action.
Date	1 September 1914
Location	Néry, Oise, northern France 49°16′56″N 02°46′45″E
Result	British victory

Belligerents
United Kingdom	German Empire

Commanders and leaders
(United Kingdom of Great Britain and Ireland) Charles Briggs	(German Empire) Otto von Garnier

Units involved
1st Cavalry Brigade; L Battery, RHA	4th Cavalry Division

Strength
c. 2,000 men and six guns	c. 5,200 men and twelve guns

Casualties and losses
135 killed and wounded.	Unknown casualties; 78 prisoners.

The Affair of Néry was a skirmish fought on 1 September 1914 between the British Army and the German Army, part of the Great Retreat from Mons during the early stages of the First World War. A British cavalry brigade preparing to leave their overnight bivouac were attacked by a German cavalry division of about twice their strength, shortly after dawn. Both sides fought dismounted; the British artillery was mostly put out of action in the first few minutes but a gun of L Battery, Royal Horse Artillery kept up a steady fire for two and a half hours, against a full battery of German artillery. British reinforcements arrived at around 8:00 a.m., counter-attacked the Germans and forced them to retreat; the German division was routed and did not return to combat for several days. Three men of L Battery were awarded the Victoria Cross for their part in the battle, the battery was later awarded the honour title of "Néry", the only British Army unit to have this as a battle honour.

== Background ==
After the British and German armies first encountered each other at the Battle of Mons on 23 August 1914, the outnumbered British Expeditionary Force had begun to fall back in front of a stronger German army. The two clashed again at the Battle of Le Cateau on 26 August, after which the British again withdrew towards the river Marne. The withdrawal was orderly and disciplined; the German command mistakenly believed the British force was shattered and so neglected to aggressively harass them as they withdrew. As a result, the bulk of the Expeditionary Force was able to withdraw for several days without engaging in any major fighting; the German pursuit was leisurely, and most engagements were skirmishes between rearguard units and cavalry patrols, rarely more than a battalion in strength.

On 31 August, the Expeditionary Force continued falling back to the south-west, crossing the river Aisne between Soissons and Compiègne, with a rear guard provided by the brigades of the Cavalry Division. The day's march was cut short by the warm weather, which exhausted the already fatigued infantry, and they halted for the night just south of the Aisne. The I Corps bivouacked north of the forest around Villers-Cotterêts, with the II Corps to their south-west at Crepy-en-Valois, and the III Corps further to the west around Verberie. This left a gap of around five miles between the II and III Corps, which was filled by the 1st Cavalry Brigade, stationed at the village of Néry. The brigade had spent the day scouting for the German vanguard to the north-west of Compiegne, and did not reach its rest area until dusk, around 8.30pm. The British plan for the following day was for a march of ten to fourteen miles southwards to a new defensive line, which called for an early departure from their rest areas; the III Corps rearguards were expected to pass through Néry by 6 am, which would already have been vacated by the cavalry. However, most units had reached their overnight stations quite late on the 31st, and so General Pulteney, the corps commander, ordered a later departure.

Behind the retreating British forces, the German 1st Army on the right wing had begun to swing south, aiming to cross the river Oise around Compiègne, with the goal of cutting off the retreat of the French Fifth Army and isolating Paris. On the afternoon of 31 August, the 5th Division was identified about eight miles north-west of Compiègne and heading southwards, whilst the leading cavalry divisions of the army crossed the Oise north of Compiègne around the same time. The German units were on a forced march, ordered to reconnoitre towards Paris with all possible speed, and had begun moving at 4 am that morning. Many would continue through the following night; some prisoners at Néry said that they had been travelling for twenty-six hours without sleep. They pressed on regardless of fatigue; one regimental commander responded to complaints that his men were being pushed too hard with the curt remark that "sweat saves blood". (Note: The officer quoted is the commander of the 12. Grenadier-Regiment, in 5th Division.) The first contact between the armies that evening was just after nightfall, when the 2nd Royal Welch Fusiliers of III Corps encountered a patrol of the 8. Husaren-Regiment, of the 9th Cavalry Division, outside Verberie, on the extreme west flank of the British force. (Note: Edmonds quotes the 8. Husaren as part of the 4th Cavalry Division, but per Viser, they were assigned to 9th Cavalry Division.)

== Prelude ==
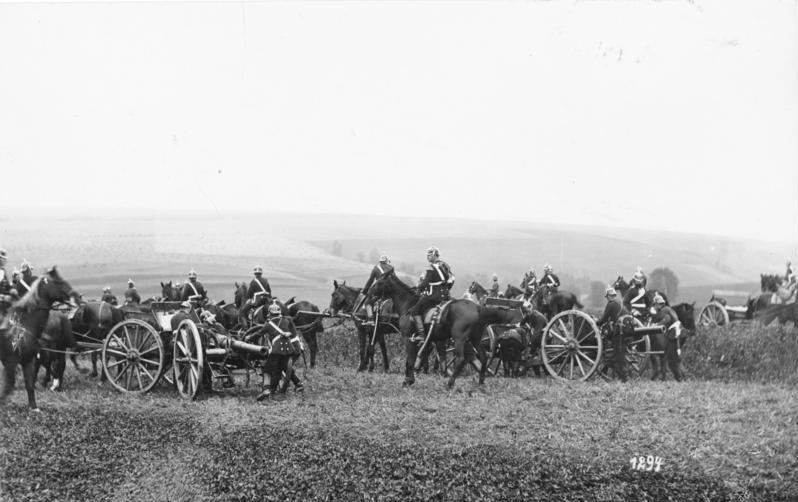
German horse artillery on manoeuvres, pre-war

On the British side, the 1st Cavalry Brigade bivouacked at Néry consisted of three cavalry regiments under the command of Brigadier-General Sir Charles Briggs, the 2nd Dragoon Guards (Queen's Bays), 5th (Princess Charlotte of Wales's) Dragoon Guards and 11th (Prince Albert's Own) Hussars. Each had a nominal strength of 549 men in three squadrons, with two Vickers machine-guns; They were supported by L Battery of the Royal Horse Artillery, which had a nominal strength of 205 men with six 13-pounder guns. Both units were part of the British Expeditionary Force (BEF) Cavalry Division, and had seen action throughout the Retreat from Mons, including fighting at the Battle of Mons and the Battle of Le Cateau but neither had suffered many casualties and were still close to establishment size. (Note: Edmonds notes various engagements by the 1st Brigade and by L Battery, from 24 August onwards, but does not note any significant casualties to any of the units.)

The German First Army was screened on its left flank by the three Divisions of the Höheres Kavallerie-Kommando 2, under General George Cornelius von der Marwitz, that included the 2nd, 4th and 9th Cavalry Divisions, while the Second Army's right flank was screened by the two Divisions of the Höheres Kavallerie-Kommando 1 under General Manfred Freiherr von Richthofen, which included the Guard Cavalry Division and the 5th Cavalry Division. The two Corps had united on 30 August in the vicinity of Noyon. After a day of rest on the 30th, the HKK 1 was to advance towards Soissons, and the HKK 2 towards Villers Cotterets via Thourette.

After crossing the Oise at Thourette, Marwitz received flight intelligence that the French were withdrawing south from Soissons. If they had proceeded in a southeasterly direction they would have only reached the rear of the retreating French, On his own initiative, he redirected his command to the south in an attempt to catch them on the flank. Marwitz was completely unaware of the British forces to the south. The HKK 2 was to make an all night march with the 4th Division proceeding directly through the forest of Compeigne, with the other two Divisions taking a longer route around the west side of the forest. They were to rendezvous between 6 and 7 in the morning at Rosieres.

Commanded by General Otto von Garnier, the division consisted of six 722-man cavalry regiments in three brigades, along with a divisional artillery battalion of twelve guns, a battery of six machine-guns and two Jäger (light infantry) battalions, each with a further six machine-guns; the total strength was around 5,200 men. The divisional units were the 3. Kavallerie-Brigade (2. Kürassier-Regiment (Königin)(Pommersches)and 9.Pommerschen Ulanen-Regiment) commanded by Karl Leopold Graf von der Goltz, the 17. Kavallerie-Brigade (1. Großherzoglich Mecklenburgisches Dragoner-Regiment 17. and 2. Großherzoglich Mecklenburgisches Dragoner-Regiment 18.) commanded by Ernst Graf von Schimmelmann, and the 18. Kavallerie-Brigade (15th Husar Regiment Queen Wilhelmina of the Netherlands. and 16. Husaren-Regiment) commanded by Walther von Printz.

The Germans were equally affected by the fog, but several patrols were dispatched to reconnoitre the area. Vize-Feldwebel von Michael of the 17th Dragoons led a patrol to the west towards the south side of Nery. Heaing the familiar sounds of a camp and initially thinking it was another German regiment, Michael, exercising caution, dismounted, moved closer and after removing their helmets peered over a wall, and found himself within two metres of an English Corporal shaving. Carefully withdrawing and leading their horses for a safe distance, they remounted and raced to give the news to Garnier. At the same time, a second patrol under Sgt. Dittman of the 17th were shocked to meet a British Cavalry patrol, probably from the 11th Hussars. The German reports state that the British Officer was thrown and by the time he had caught his horse and returned to the Camp, the German artillery was already firing. Upon receipt of the reports from his patrols, von Garnier immediately decided to attack. Two of his mounted batteries were moved up to within 500 metres of Nery, and a platoon of mounted machine guns placed on each flank of the guns.

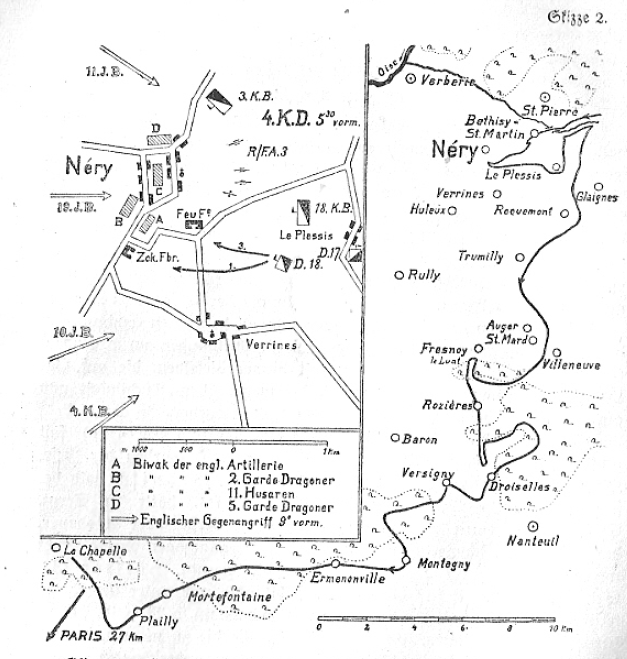
German sketch map of the battle of Nery, 1 September 1914

== Battle ==
"On the 1st September, when retiring from the thickly wooded country to the south of Compiègne, the 1st Cavalry Brigade was overtaken by some German cavalry. They momentarily lost a Horse Artillery battery, and several officers and men were killed and wounded. With the help, however, of some detachments from the 3rd Corps operating on their left, they not only recovered their own guns but succeeded in capturing twelve of the enemy's."

— Despatch of Sir John French, 17 September 1914.

Néry is set in a north–south oriented valley around a small river, which feeds into the river Automne to the north; it is overlooked from the east and west by high bluffs. The main landmark was a sugar factory, just south of the village, where L Battery were billeted; the cavalry regiments were stationed in and around the village proper. Dawn on 1 September came with heavy fog lying in the valley; the force had been awakened and prepared for a move at 4.30 am, but due to the terrible visibility it was decided to wait an hour and a half for the mist to clear, and the men stood down to rest, water the horses, and prepare breakfast. The teams for the artillery were left harnessed to their guns, but with the limbers lowered to take the weight off the horses. At 5.25 am, a patrol from the 11th Hussars, which had been sent out to the south-east, encountered a strong force of enemy cavalry and escaped back to the village; the regiment quickly took up dismounted defensive positions along the eastern edge of the village, though the commander of the 5th Dragoon Guards refused to believe an attack was imminent.

At 5.40 am, firing began from the heights overlooking the village from the east, supported by machine-guns and light artillery. This was the advanced guard of the 4th Cavalry Division, which had been surprised to encounter a British force, and signalled that it had unexpectedly "been surrounded by considerable hostile forces". The commander, General von Garnier, sized up the situation and quickly ordered a dismounted attack on the village.

The effects of the fire from the heights were dramatic; the riderless horses of the 2nd Dragoon Guards took fright and bolted along the road northwards, whilst the artillery was immobilised and forced to remain in the firing line. One of the first casualties was the commander of the battery, Major Sclater-Booth, who was knocked unconscious as he ran towards the guns; the second-in-command of the battery, Captain Bradbury, took charge, and managed to get three guns moved into firing positions, facing twelve field guns on the ridge to the east. Two were quickly knocked out, leaving only one gun, under the direction of Captain Bradbury assisted by Sergeant Nelson and three other men. It kept up a steady fire, drawing the attention of the German artillery away from the cavalry, until its ammunition was almost exhausted; Bradbury was hit by a shell whilst trying to fetch more ammunition, and fatally wounded. The gun continued firing under Nelson and Battery Sergeant-Major Dorrell, but finally fell silent sometime before 8am, when reinforcements arrived.

Whilst Bradbury kept the gun in action, the men of the cavalry regiments had moved into position, on foot, along the eastern edge of the village to prevent an attack by the dismounted German cavalry. At 6am, two squadrons of the 5th Dragoon Guards were sent north to try to outflank the attackers, looping around to the east and pressing in to hold them in place. By the time Bradbury's gun stopped firing, the first reinforcements from III Corps had arrived; the 4th Cavalry Brigade with I Battery RHA, and two battalions of infantry. I Battery began firing directly on the German guns, now exposed by the clearing mist, as did the machine guns of the 1st Middlesex Regiment; the German horses took heavy casualties, and when the artillery withdrew eight of the guns had to be abandoned for lack of horses to pull them. A squadron of the 11th Hussars passed through to pursue the retreating Germans for a mile, taking seventy-eight prisoners, from all six regiments of the German division.

During the battle, the German cavalry nearly overran some of the British artillery but reinforcements were able to halt the German attack and artillery-fire in the fog caused a "temporary panic" among horses and gun-limbers. The reinforcements began to envelop the northern flank of the 4th Division and ammunition ran short, when the delivery was delayed. At 9:00 a.m. Garnier heard reports that Crépy and Béthisy were occupied and broke off the engagement to rally east of Néry, having lost a battery of artillery. The division then moved south via Rocquemont to Rozières.

== Aftermath ==
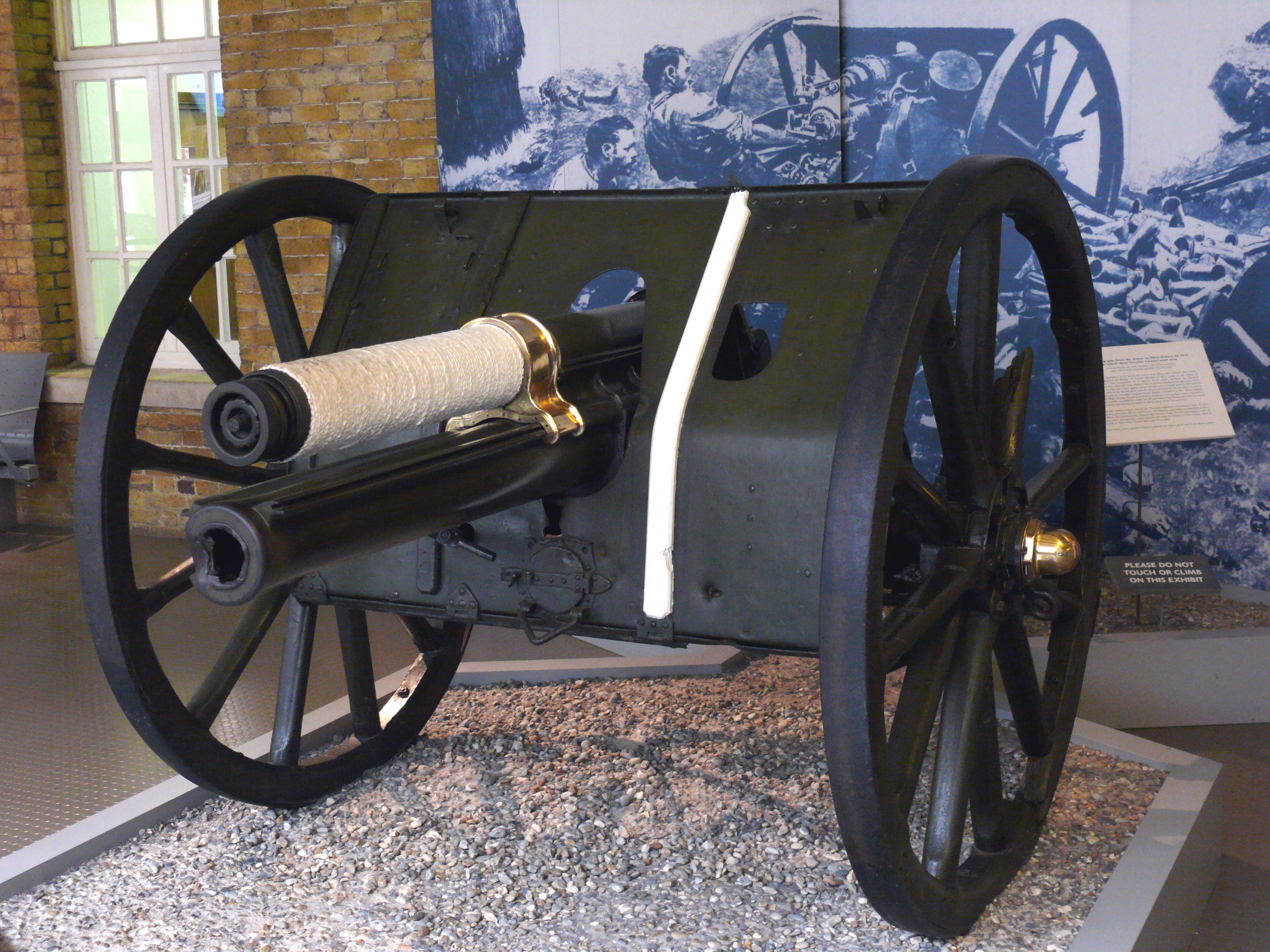
The "Néry Gun" at the Imperial War Museum.

L Battery was almost destroyed as an operational unit in the engagement, losing all five officers and a quarter of its men and was withdrawn to England in order to reform. (Note: The casualties were five officers and forty-nine men (five officers and forty-two men in Farndale; most sources concur with forty-nine), from a nominal strength of five officers and two hundred other ranks. As noted above, the commanding officer was knocked unconscious, the second-in-command died of his wounds shortly after the fighting finished, two of the lieutenants were killed and one was wounded.Edmonds, p. 239; Farndale, p. 57.) It did not see active service again until April 1915, when it was sent to Gallipoli. The three cavalry regiments of 1st Brigade suffered less, taking eighty-one casualties between them, one of whom was Colonel Ansell, the commanding officer of the 5th Dragoon Guards. The brigade major of 1st Brigade, Major John Cawley, was also killed.

Three men of L Battery were awarded the Victoria Cross for their services at Néry; Captain Edward Bradbury, Battery Sergeant-Major George Dorrell, and Sergeant David Nelson. Bradbury was fatally wounded at the end of the fighting, dying shortly afterwards; Nelson was killed in action in April 1918, whilst Dorrell survived the war. Both Dorrell and Nelson were also given commissions as second lieutenants; they would later reach the rank of Lieutenant-Colonel and Major respectively. The VCs awarded to all three, along with the surviving gun which they had used, are now on display at the Imperial War Museum in London. Lieutenant Giffard of L Battery, who survived, was awarded the French Croix de Chevalier of the Légion d'honneur, and two men from the battery were awarded the Médaille militaire. The lieutenant commanding the machine-gun section of 2nd Dragoon Guards was awarded the Distinguished Service Order, with two of his men receiving the Distinguished Conduct Medal. (Note: Note that two members of 5th Dragoon Guards also awarded the DCM, though it is not clear if it was for Néry or for another engagement.) L Battery was later awarded the honour title of "Néry"; it was the only unit to be awarded this as a battle honour, although it was applied for by both the 5th Dragoon Guards and the 11th Hussars. The other participating units received the honour Retreat from Mons.

The 4th Cavalry Division, conversely, was almost completely routed. Its actual casualties are unknown, though were thought to be greater than the British losses, and eight of their twelve guns were captured by the counterattack of the Middlesex Regiment. The brigades were ordered to disperse – according to one officer, they "had to withdraw or be destroyed" when the strength of the British reinforcements became apparent, and scattered in various directions. The Germans either moved north into the Compiègne Forest or east towards Crépy-en-Valois, but hearing fighting at Crepy doubled back to the south-east. They halted in the forests around Rosières, south of Néry; however, they were forced to abandon their remaining four guns, and most of their food and ammunition in the process. That afternoon, the cavalry observed the British columns retreating south along the roads, but were unable to attack them because of their lack of supplies. They left Rosières in the evening of 1 September; a patrol of the 1st Rifle Brigade entered the village at 7pm and found it had just been abandoned by a cavalry unit, leaving in such haste that they had abandoned a machine-gun. The bulk of the units managed to rejoin the First Army by the morning of 3 September, but the division was left behind with a reserve corps on 4 September when the II Cavalry Corps began to advance again. (Note: The quotation is from an unnamed officer of the 18. Dragoner-Regiment. Edmonds gives a figure of "three hundred Uhlans" reported in Rosières, which suggests that the 9. Ulanen-Regiment, at least, had been reduced to around half its original strength through casualties or through stragglers in the retreat; however, it is possible that this was a different unit, or a mixture of units, with any cavalry simply being referred to as "Uhlans".Edmonds, p. 239.)

Nineteen identifiable British dead from the action, all from L battery bar Cawley, are buried at Nery Communal Cemetery. The cemetery also contains a number of unidentified British burials (fewer than ten) and Cawley's brother, killed in 1918, was also buried there.

== Sources ==
Books

- Baker, Anthony (1986). Battle Honours of the British and Commonwealth Armies. Littlehampton Book Services Ltd. ISBN 0-7110-1600-3.
- Edmonds, J. E. (1926). Military Operations France and Belgium 1914: Mons, the Retreat to the Seine, the Marne and the Aisne August–October 1914. History of the Great War Based on Official Documents by Direction of the Historical Section of the Committee of Imperial Defence. Vol. I (2nd ed.). London: Macmillan. OCLC 58962523.
- Farndale, M. (1986). Western Front 1914–18. History of the Royal Regiment of Artillery. London: Royal Artillery Institution. ISBN 1-870114-00-0.
- Glanfield, J. (2005). Bravest of the Brave: the Story of the Victoria Cross. Sutton. ISBN 978-0-7509-3695-8.
- Humphries, M. O.; Maker, J. (2013). Der Weltkrieg: 1914 The Battle of the Frontiers and Pursuit to the Marne. Germany's Western Front: Translations from the German Official History of the Great War. Vol. I. Part 1. Waterloo, Canada: Wilfrid Laurier University Press. ISBN 978-1-55458-373-7.
- Terraine, J. (2002). Mons: Retreat to Victory. Wordsworth. ISBN 1-84022-243-3.
- von Larisch, Heribert (1924). Das 2. Großherzoglich Mecklenburgische Dragoner-Regiment Nr.18 im Weltkrieg 1914-1918. Gerhard Stalling.
- von Troschke, Paul (1940). Die deutsche Heereskavallerie am Entscheidungsflügel 1914. Deutsche Tat im Weltkrieg 1914/18. Bernard & Graefe.
- von Troschke, Paul (1938). Geschichte des 1. Großherzoglich Mecklenburgische Dragoner-Regiments Nr.17. Bernard & Graefe.

Websites

- Viser, J. (2009). "The Prussian Machine – German Army – Cavalry".
