= 119th Brigade, Royal Field Artillery =

Artillery unit of the British Army

- Royal Artillery cap badge
- Active: January 1915–June 1919
- Country: United Kingdom
- Branch: Kitchener's Army
- Role: Field artillery
- Size: 4 Batteries
- Part of: 38th (Welsh) Division; Second Army
- Patron: Welsh National Executive Committee
- Engagements: Battle of the Somme; Battle of Messines; Battle of Passchendaele; Battle of the Lys; Outtersteene Ridge; Fifth Battle of Ypres

Commanders
- Notable commanders: Lt-Col P.J. Paterson, CMG, DSO

CXIX Brigade (119th Brigade) (Note: 'Brigade' was the Royal Artillery term for a lieutenant-colonel's command comprising a number of batteries 'brigaded' together; it was the equivalent of an infantry battalion or cavalry regiment.) was a Royal Field Artillery (RFA) unit raised as part of 'Kitchener's Army' during World War I. Initially recruited in Wales as part of 38th (Welsh) Division, it served on the Western Front and saw action on the Somme. At the beginning of 1917 it became an independent 'Army Field Artillery' brigade, supporting various formations at the battles of Messines and Passchendaele in 1917, the Battle of the Lys during the German Spring Offensive of 1918, and the victorious Allied Hundred Days Offensive. It was disbanded after the Armistice.

== Recruitment ==
On 6 August 1914, less than 48 hours after Britain's declaration of war, Parliament sanctioned an increase of 500,000 men for the Regular British Army, and the newly-appointed Secretary of State for War, Earl Kitchener of Khartoum issued his famous call to arms: 'Your King and Country Need You', urging the first 100,000 volunteers to come forward. This group of six divisions with supporting arms became known as Kitchener's First New Army, or 'K1'. The flood of volunteers overwhelmed the ability of the army to absorb and organise them, and by the time the Fifth New Army (K5) was authorised, many of the units were being organised by local recruitment initiatives. One of the largest of these was the 'Welsh National Executive Committee' (WNEC) formed after a meeting held at Cardiff on 28 September under the chairmanship of David Lloyd George. The WNEC proposed to raise a complete Welsh Army Corps of two divisions. This proposal was authorised by the WO on 10 October, and recruitment got under way. As well as the infantry 'Pals battalions' raised by these initiatives, the K5 divisions required supporting arms such as artillery and engineers. The first field artillery battery for the 1st Welsh Division was formed at Sophia Gardens at Cardiff towards the end of October. It was then sent with the other artillery recruits to the training camp at Porthcawl where they were divided into subsections. There were no uniforms before the WNEC procured clothing in the grey Welsh cloth known as Brethyn Llwyd which the men wore until sufficient khaki could be obtained. There was a complete lack of equipment with which to train, and gun drill had to be carried out with improvisations such as a pair of old horse-drawn omnibus wheels fitted with a pole and hook to practise limbering-up. 1st Welsh Division was numbered as 43rd Division on 10 December 1914.

== Organisation and Training ==
In January 1915 the artillery recruits at Porthcawl were organised into four batteries, numbered 1–4. They moved to Pwllheli in February and over the following weeks each was ordered to form a second battery (Nos 5–8). During March and April the batteries split once again resulting in the 16 field batteries (4 brigades) and 1 heavy battery required for divisional artillery. In April 1915 the WO decided to convert the K4 battalions into reserve units to train reinforcements for the K1–K3 units, and on 27 April the K5 divisions were renumbered to take up the designations of the K4 formations. The short-lived 43rd Division thus became 38th (Welsh) Division on 27 April (the WNEC's over-ambitious plan to raise a complete Welsh Army Corps had been abandoned by then, and the 38th was the only Welsh Kitchener division actually formed). The division's embryo Royal Field Artillery (RFA) brigades were given numbers vacated by the break-up of the K4 divisions: CXIX–CXXI (119th–121st) from 30th Division, and CXXII (122nd) from 31st Division. As well as the number, the Welsh units gained those personnel who had already been posted to the K4 brigades, bringing 38th (Welsh) Divisional Artillery (38th (W) DA) closer to its establishment strength. CXIX Brigade was organised as follows:

- A & B Batteries – from No 2 Bty formed at Porthcawl January 1915
- C & D Batteries – from No 6 Bty formed at Pwllheli 3 March 1915
- CXIX Brigade Ammunition Column (BAC)

When fully equipped, each battery would consist of four 18-pounder guns. In August 1915 38th (W) Division began to concentrate around Winchester where it trained for open warfare on the Hampshire downland. However, for 38th (W) DA the process of organisation continued for several months. Temporary Lieutenant-Colonel Philip Paterson, who had been Mentioned in dispatches while commanding 2nd Bty, RFA, on the Western Front earlier in the year, was appointed commanding officer (CO) of CXIX Bde during November. By the time the brigade went overseas, Major F.W. Salmond was second in command and officer commanding (OC) B Bty. The OC of A Bty was Captain George Thomas Dorrell, who had won a Victoria Cross as Battery Sergeant-Major of L Bty, Royal Horse Artillery, at Néry in 1914. On 6 November 38th (W) Division was warned for service with the British Expeditionary Force (BEF) on the Western Front, but while the rest of the division embarked for France in early December 1915, 38th (W) DA remained behind to complete its training on the ranges at Larkhill.

== Western Front ==
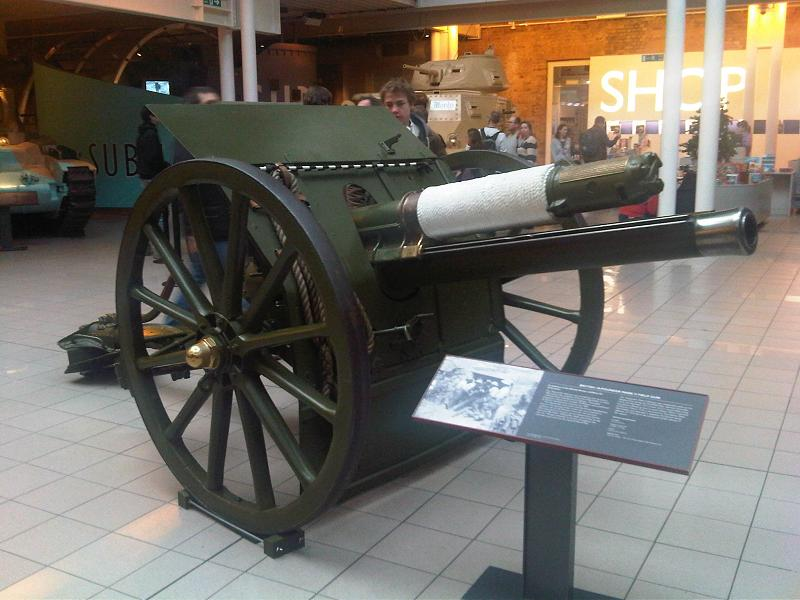
18-Pounder field gun preserved at the Imperial War Museum.

CXIX Brigade left Avington Camp, Winchester, on 22 December and marched to Southampton Docks where it embarked for Le Havre in France, landing the following morning. It travelled by train to Saint-Venant, where it was billeted from 25 December. On 31 December a first detachment of officers, telephonists and gunners was attached to batteries of Guards Divisional Artillery for introduction to front line duties. In late January 1916 another party was attached to 19th (Western) Divisional Artillery for the same purpose. On 29 January half of the brigade relieved half of LXXXVI Bde of 19th (W) DA at Vieille-Chapelle where 38th (W) Division had taken over responsibility. 38th (W) DA completed the relief of 19th (W) DA on 30/31 January, when CXIX Bde was distributed with A Bty acting as 'Counter-Battery' (CB), B Bty as 'Flank guns', C Bty had pairs of guns attached to other batteries as flank guns, and D Bty was attached to 'Left Group' of 38th (W) DA.

From January until June 38th (W) DA was continually in the line along different parts of XI Corps' front. There was little firing to begin with because poor weather restricted observation, but the batteries began registering their guns on targets such as buildings or suspected enemy strongpoints and observation posts (OPs), and carried out retaliatory fire at the request of the infantry in response to German shelling. Early in 1916 a number CXIX Bde's officers were evacuated sick, including Maj Salmond, and Capt Dorrell commanded the brigade when Paterson went on leave during March. In April CXIX Bde moved to Laventie to take over 38th (W) DA's Left Group. German aircraft and observation balloons were active when the weather permitted, and their positions having been located the batteries came under more frequent CB fire from heavy artillery, particularly D Bty, but the gunners had installed double thickness roofs over their gun pits and damage was slight. On 15 May a small operation was carried out to breach the Wyck salient with trench mortars and heavy artillery, with A, B and C Btys of CXIX firing in enfilade along the trenches and communication trenches, A and D Btys also standing by to fire defensive barrages in case of an enemy counter-attack. The operation was successful, but drew heavy retaliatory fire on the front line trenches, including CXIX Bde's OPs. Similar operations to breach the enemy parapets for infantry trench raids were carried out over following weeks.

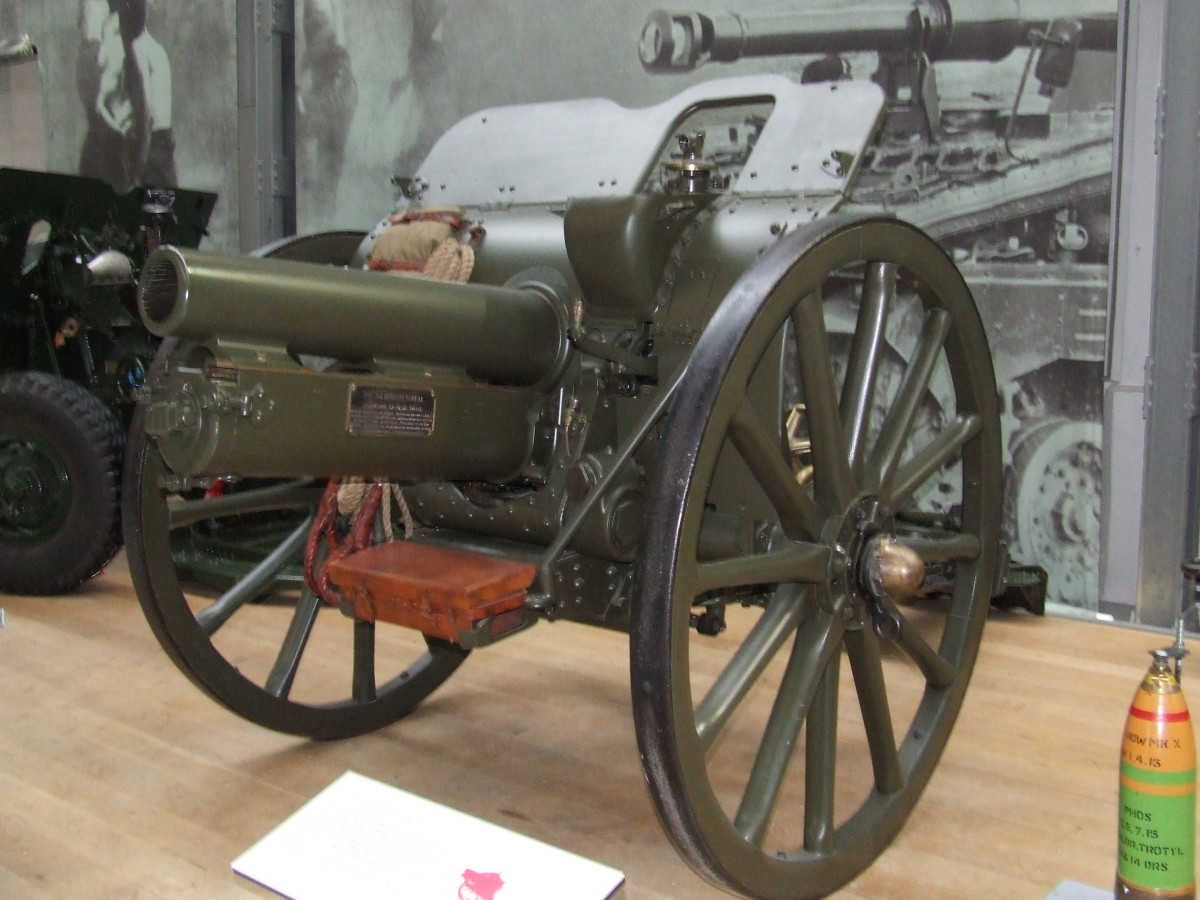
4.5-inch Howitzer at the Royal Artillery Museum.

In May 38th (W) DA was reorganised to match current practice in the BEF. The Brigade Ammunition Columns were disbanded and absorbed by 38th (W) Divisional Ammunition Column (DAC). CXXII (Howitzer) Brigade exchanged a battery with each of the other brigades on 24 May, with the result that all four brigades had three 18-pdr batteries and one 4.5-inch howitzer battery (designated D (H) Battery). The changes to CXIX Brigade's organisation were as follows:

- A/CXIX – left to become A/CXXII
- B/CXIX
- C/CXIX
- D/CXIX – redesignated A/CXIX
- A (H)/CXXII – joined to become D (H)/CXIX

=== Somme ===
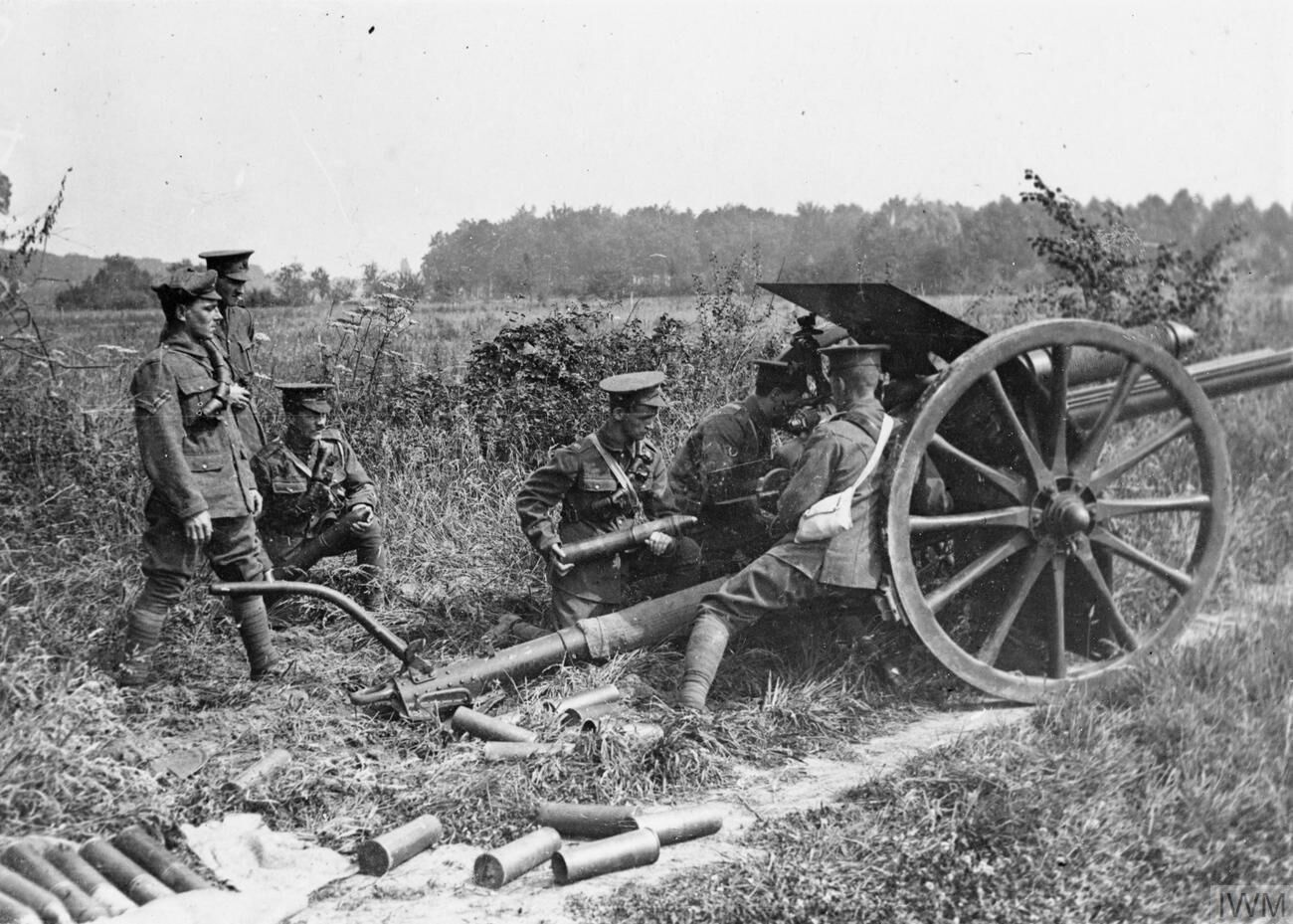
An 18-pounder in action on the Somme.

On 10 June 38th (W) Division was ordered south to join Fourth Army and prepare for the summer's 'Big Push', the Battle of the Somme. After being relieved, 38th (W) DA began its march on 14 June and arrived at 'Grand Camp' near Saint-Pol two days later. Here it spent two weeks training before continuing its march to the south behind the infantry of the division, reaching Treux Wood on 4 July. The Somme Offensive had begun on 1 July with a disastrous attack across a wide front. 38th (W) Division had been warned to accompany the cavalry in exploiting a breakthrough towards Bapaume. There was no breakthrough: instead the division was switched to the Mametz sector, where there had been some success. On the afternoon of 5 July it took over the front line and prepared to capture Mametz Wood. However, most of 38th (W) DA had not yet arrived, so the infantry's attack on 7 June was supported by the artillery of two other divisions with whom they had not previously worked, which led to poor coordination. Part of 38th (W) DA then went into action in the Fricourt–Mametz sector under the command of 21st DA, supporting 17th (Northern) Division's attack. CXIX Brigade had to hand over six 18-pdrs and two howitzers to replace guns of 21st DA that were out of action (it later received two howitzers and one 18-pdr of 21st DA that had been repaired). The brigade came into action at Fricourt and began registering its guns on 9 July. During the successful attack on Mametz Wood on 10 July, CXIX Bde was pushed forward to cut the enemy barbed wire for 17th (N) Division. Next day it began registering targets in the German second line at Bazentin le Petit Wood beyond 38th (W) Division's new positions, and continued shelling this line (suffering some casualties from return fire) until it was successfully attacked on 14 July (the Battle of Bazentin Ridge). The infantry of 38th (W) Division had already been withdrawn from the line by then, but 38th (W) DA continued firing in support of XV Corps' Attacks on High Wood until 19 July. It then left Fourth Army and marched to rejoin 38th (W) Division with Reserve Army around Couin in the now-quiet northern part of the Somme sector opposite Serre.

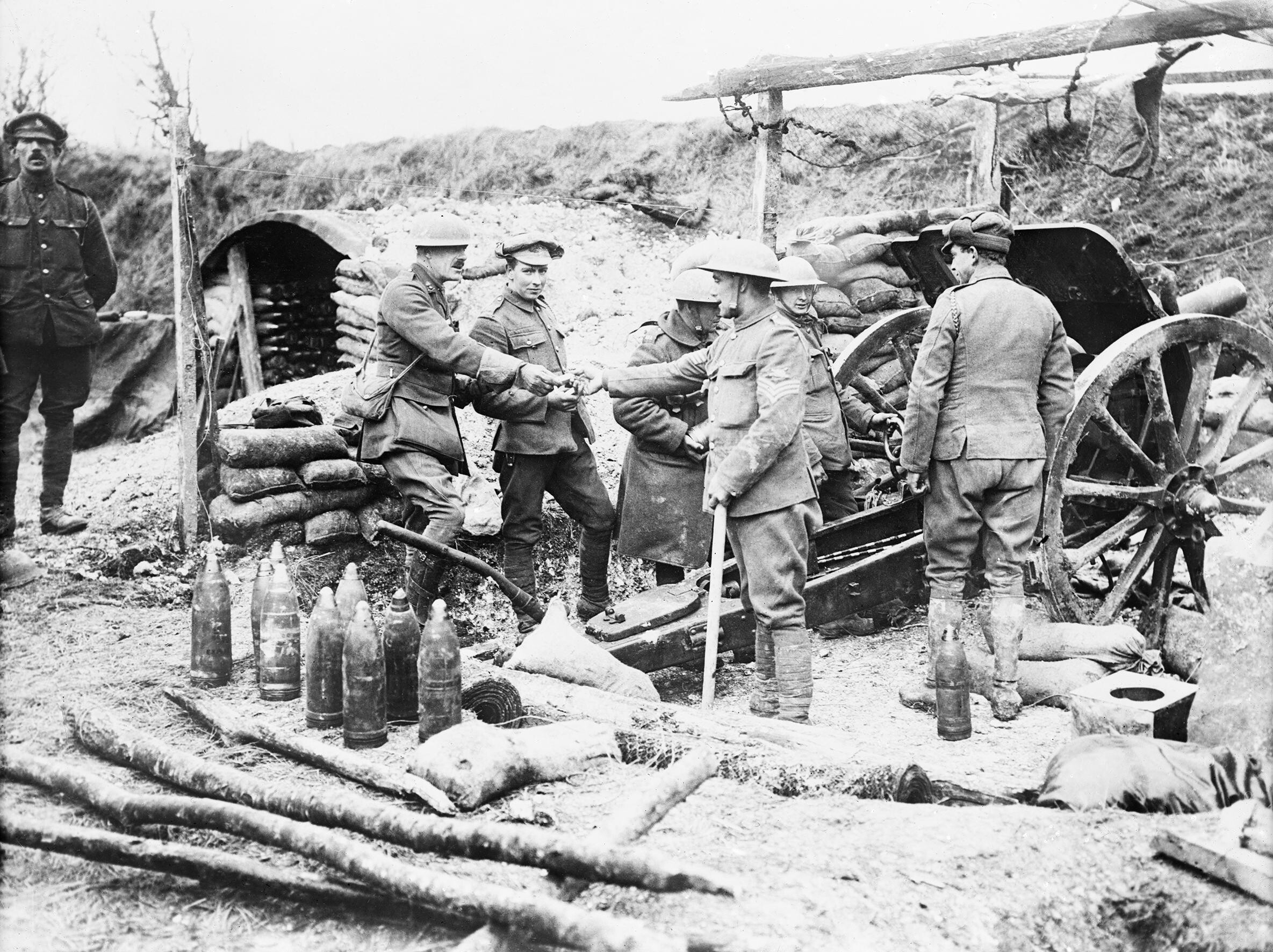
A 4.5-inch howitzer in action on the Somme.

38th (W) DA took over the guns and positions of 48th (South Midland) DA, with CXIX Bde in Right Group. On the nights of 24/25 and 25/26 July, as part of the policy of 'thinning out' the troops in this quiet sector, 38th (W) DA took over more of the front from 12th (Eastern) DA at Mailly-Maillet with a mixed group of batteries under Lt-Col Paterson of CXIX Bde ('Paterson's Group'): D (H)/CXIX, A/CXX, B & C/CXXII and V/38 Trench Mortar Battery; the men of B/CXIX took over A/CXX's guns next day. The guns carried out some registration and night firing. 38th (W) Division's infantry were relieved and left Fifth Army on 29 July, but 38th (W) DA remained in position. CXIX Brigade was relieved on the nights of 6–8 August and marched to rest bivouacs at Hem-Hardinval. It entrained on 13 August and rejoined 38th (W) Division resting round Esquelbecq behind the Ypres Salient. CXIX took over guns in positions near Chateau de Trois Tours facing Pilckem Ridge on 21 August, with Lt-Col Paterson in command of 38th (W) DA's Left Group.

=== Ypres Salient ===
The BEF's field artillery was now being reorganised into six-gun batteries: in three of 38th W) DA's brigades one 18-pdr battery was split up to bring the others up to six guns, and was replaced by a battery from CXX Bde, which was broken up on 28–29 August. As a result, CXIX Brigade now had two howitzer batteries:

- A/CXIX Bty (6 x 18-pdrs) – A Bty + half C Bty
- B/CXIX Bty (6 x 18-pdrs) – B Bty + half C Bty
- C (H)/CXIX Bty (4 x 4.5-inch) – ex D (H)/CXX Bty
- D (H)/CXIX Bty (4 x 4.5-inch)

The Ypres Salient was relatively quiet at this period. CXIX Bde carried out routine bombardments and wire-cutting at the request of the infantry. Retaliatory fire was often directed at the German OPs in 'High Command Redoubt', with little effect. Paterson and his HQ moved to Proven 23–28 September, and then to Regersburg Chateau on 29 September, where he took over command of Right Group; only C Bty of his own brigade was in this group. On the night of 28/29 September B & D (H)/CXIX of Left Group carried out a shoot to support a raid by 13th Royal Welsh Fusiliers (1st North Wales) and 11th South Wales Borderers (2nd Gwent) (SWB) on 'Canadian Dugouts'. On 9/10 October C/CXIX and the rest of Right Group supported a raid by 13th Welsh Regiment (2nd Rhondda), and on 13 October D (H)/CXIX supported another raid by 13th RWF on the 'Caesar's Nose' salient on Pilckem Ridge. B Battery fired a demonstration barrage on 17 November to attract attention away from a large and destructive raid on High Command Redoubt by 14th Welsh Regiment (Swansea). Lieutenant-Col Paterson and Bde HQ returned to command Left Group on 29 November. Another raid was carried out by the division on the 'Krupp Salient' on 9/10 December. On 15/16 December CXIX Bde was relieved and the personnel went back by motor lorries to rest billets at Houtkerque. From 19 December the brigade with its horses and vehicles carried out a three-day march to a training area on the beach at Wissant. At the beginning of 1917 the brigade marched to Herzeele, arriving on 4 January.

== CXIX Army Field Artillery Brigade ==
After the Somme, General Headquarters decided that it needed a reserve of field artillery to reinforce parts of the front without breaking up divisional artillery. Each infantry division contributed one of its RFA brigades to become independent Army Field Artillery (AFA) brigades in this reserve. 38th (Welsh) DA provided CXIX Bde, which formally left the division on 14 January 1917 while it was at Herzeele. Before it transferred, its C (H) Bty was split up between D (H)/CXXI and D (H)/CXXII of 38th (W) DA to bring them up to 6 guns each, and CXIX was joined by B/CLXXIX and half of D (H)/CLXXIX from 39th (Deptford) DA to bring it up to full strength:

- A/CXIX Bty (6 x 18-pdrs)
- B/CXIX Bty (6 x 18-pdrs)
- C/CXIX Bty (6 x 18-pdrs) – ex B/CLXXIX Bty
- D (H)/CXIX Bty (6 x 4.5-inch) – D (H)/CXIX Bty + half D (H)/CLXXIX Bty
- CXIX BAC – ex No 3 Section, 38th (W) DAC

In fact CXIX AFA Bde remained attached to 38th (W) Division for some months, and moved with it to Elverdinge in the Ypres Salient on 19 January. Lieutenant-Col Paterson continued to command Left Group of 38th (W) DA during this period and even acted as CRA of 38th (W) Division for a few days in May. Captain (later Maj) F.P. Wye of D Bty commanded CXIX Bde when Paterson was absent. 38th (W) Division was the left hand division of the BEF, and on 30 January Left Group brought down effective defensive fire when Germans raided the Belgian troops to the left. During February the Germans systematically shelled gun positions on 38th (W) Division's front with heavy guns and gas shells, but caused little damage: two of C Bty's guns were put out of action on 6 February but there were no casualties. C/CXIX later shifted position: the old position received 200 heavy howitzer rounds on 21 March, but the one gun still on thr position was undamaged. The sector quietened down at the end of March and remained so until early May, when the Germans heavily shelled the back areas. On 21/22 May CXIX AFA Bde was withdrawn to its waggon lines at Watou where it was accommodated in tents.

=== Messines ===
After rest, CXIX AFA Bde was to be attached from 30 May to 47th (2nd London) Division with X Corps, Second Army, for the Battle of Messines. Each battery of CXIX was assigned to a different group of 47th (2nd L) DA, with Bde HQ in reserve. Second Army had gathered huge numbers of guns and stockpiled vast amounts of ammunition (by 'Z' Day there were to be 1000 rounds per 18-pdr gun and 750 per 4.5-inch howitzer). The Germans were shelling the roads up which this ammunition had to be delivered to CXIX AFA Bde's batteries, causing casualties among the drivers, but the guns were in position as scheduled on 30 May. Preparatory CB and wire-cutting fire had begun on 21 May, and the brigade's batteries joined in progressively, beginning with registration and a few 'SOS' shoots, then covering British raids. The British bombardment grew in intensity, the field batteries firing practice barrages on 3 and 5 June. German retaliatory fire caused numerous casualties: the gunners had to fire wearing gas masks. A/CXIX Battery attached to CCXCVIII AFA Bde had its ammunition dump set on fire on 1 June and lost its OC wounded the next day. C/CXIX Battery at Trois Rois lost one gun demolished by enemy fire on 1 June, two more on 4 June, and another on 6 June, when No 2 gun was also jammed by a near-miss, and the last broken down. Z Day was fixed for 7 June. The Germans were well aware that an attack was imminent, but the element of surprise came from 19 huge mines dug under the Messines Ridge. These were exploded at zero hour, 03.10, and the field guns began firing a complex series of creeping barrages to cover the advance of the infantry. The main barrage halted after each objective, becoming a standing barrage 150–300 yards (140–270 m) ahead of the attacking infantry to protect them from counter-attacks while they consolidated the captured ground and prepared for their next bound. The frontline German troops were completely demoralised by the massive mine explosions and the attackers had a relatively easy task in capturing the ridge. 47th (2nd L) Division astride the Ypres–Comines Canal followed just 30 yards (27 m) behind the barrage, crossing the 300 yards (270 m) of the German front trench system in 15 minutes, and then took its second objectives of 'White Chateau' and the 'Dammstrasse', though the 'Spoil Bank' next to the canal held out, and defied a second attack behind a barrage about 16.00. A/CXIX Battery fired 4000 rounds in the day, B Bty 4860 in the creeping barrage, and a further 2080 for the afternoon attack, and even in C Bty the remaining damaged No 2 gun fired blind all day at long range. Next day C Bty handed over its surviving gun and withdrew to be re-equipped, while A Bty fired a further 850 and rounds on 'SOS' tasks for the infantry and B Bty fired a 150-round smoke screen. They continued firing and moving forwards over successive days as Second Army established its new line. The fighting died down on 14 June, 47th (2nd L) Division having been relieved by 24th Division the previous day. The batteries reverted to the command of CXIX Bde, which came under 24th DA. Its eventual withdrawal on 22 June was carried out under shellfire: among the damage was the loss of the brigade's records for this period.

CXIX AFA Brigade was at rest from 23 June until 5 July, when it returned to the command of 47th (2nd L) Division, with Bde HQ commanding 47th (2nd L) DA's St Eloi Group until Lt-Col Paterson went on sick leave; Maj Wye took temporary command of the brigade. The brigade went to Boeschepe for rest and training on 20 July and although D Bty began constructing new gun positions the brigade was not engaged when X Corps took part in the Battle of Pilckem Ridge (the opening of the Third Ypres Offensive on 31 July). It was then with 41st DA in the St Eloi sector from 5 August, with Lt-Col Paterson alternating in command of 'Canal Group'. There were no active operations in this sector, but on 10 August the group fired a barrage to support an attack further north. On 22 August B/CXIX's waggon lines were bombed by an enemy aircraft causing a large number of casualties to the horses. On 27 August CXIX Bde's batteries were withdrawn from Canal Group and sent to Steenwerck to join II ANZAC Corps. CXIX AFA Brigade was reassigned to VIII Corps from 6 September. This corps commanded reserve formations in back areas and was not involved in any operations. Nevertheless, the batteries were deployed in the line, calibrating the guns and registering potential targets. There were some exchanges with hostile batteries, but ammunition shortages restricted the firing. CXIX AFA Bde was with 8th DA until 5 October, when it went to rest and training, and then was under 30th DA from 30 October.

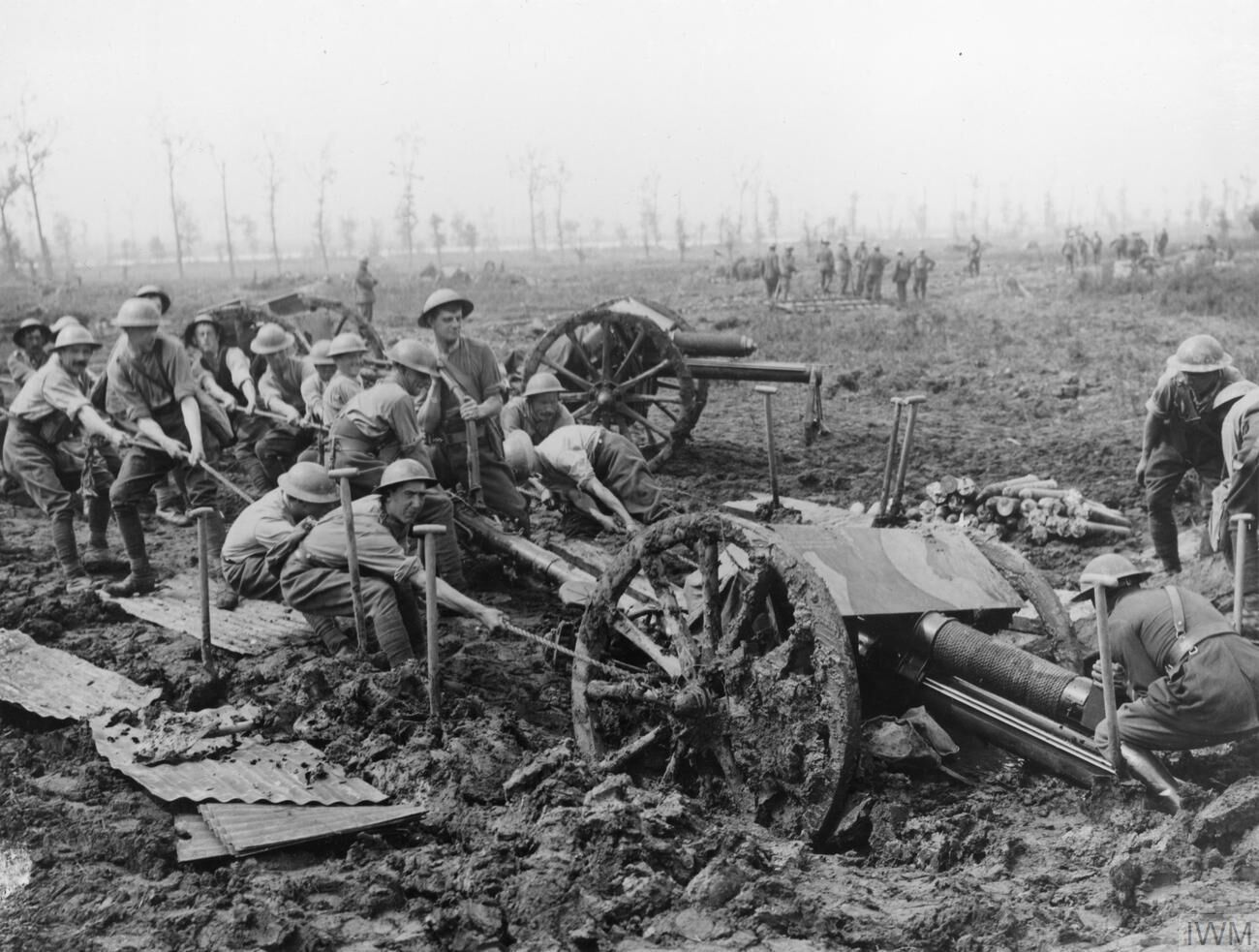
18-pounders being hauled out of mud at Ypres, 1917.

=== Passchendaele ===
However, on 1 November fresh orders were received for the transfer of CXIX AFA Bde to XIX Corps, which had just taken over part of Fifth Army's front for the Second Battle of Passchendaele. The brigade moved to Proven and joined 57th (2nd West Lancashire) DA as the fighting continued in increasingly muddy conditions. Lieutenant-Col Paterson was given command of Right Group at Pilckem comprising three AFA brigades: his own CXIX together with XXVIII and CCXCIII. CXIX's batteries were in position on 3 November, and over the following days came under heavy enemy fire, while firing SOS tasks for the hard-pressed infantry. C and D (H) Batteries each lost a gun to shellfire on 4 November, and C had another gun 'blown to pieces' on 6 November; there were a number of casualties among the gunners. On 10 November the batteries fired a 50-minute barrage for an attack through the rain on the ruins of Passchendaele village by Canadian Corps of Second Army, after which batteries remained on standby to support II Corps protecting the Canadians' flank. The Third Ypres Offensive is regarded as having ended that day, but the batteries continued to respond to SOS calls over succeeding days and both sides carried out night firing and harassing fire. As the exhausted infantry divisions were rotated, the brigade came successively under 50th (Northumbrian) DA from 10 November to 3 December, 35th DA 3–9 December, and 57th (2nd WL) DA until 12 December. It then went to rest for the remainder of the year.

=== Winter 1917–18 ===
CXIX AFA Brigade returned to VIII Corps with Fourth Army on 6 January 1918, serving with 50th (N) DA, then with 33rd DA (8–30 January), and then 50th (N) DA again. On 5 February, without its guns, CXIX AFA Bde relieved LXXXVI AFA Bde with 29th DA, providing working parties to improve gun positions, communications and OPs for the divisional reserve line among the mud and shell holes of the preceding battles. On 12 February 8th Division relieved 29th Division in Corps Reserve, CXIX AFA Bde remaining with it until 7 March when it was attached to the returning 29th DA. The men continued working on strengthening reserve positions until 10 March when VIII Corps attached CXIX AFA Bde to 33rd DA in the front line. Second Army HQ returned to take over the Ypres Salient on 17 March, and for the rest of the war the brigade was included in 'Second Army Troops'.

=== Lys ===
When the long-anticipated German spring offensive opened south of Arras on 21 March 1918 it did not affect Second Army, though hostile artillery activity increased. On 7 April 33rd Division was sent to reinforce the Arras sector. However the second phase of the offensive (the Battle of the Lys) began on 9 April, in which Second Army was directly attacked south of the Ypres Salient. 33rd Division was ordered back, but arrived without its own artillery and went into reserve behind IX Corps. CXIX Brigade HQ became HQ of No 1 Group, 33rd DA, at Low Farm and by the end of next day the group had been augmented by two batteries of XXVIII AFA Bde and two newly-arrived howitzer batteries of XLIX Bde. It covered the whole of 33rd Division's front under Maj. E. A Woods, while Lt-Col Paterson took over as temporary CRA of 33rd DA at the Ramparts of Ypres. That evening the group fired a 'Crash' task in retaliation for enemy shelling of the outposts, but on 11 April the German breakthrough towards Hazebrouck threatened the southern flank of the Salient. VIII Corps began to thin out its outposts in the Forward Zone around Passchendaele and CXIX Bde HQ and the batteries were ordered to fall back to the Army Battle Zone further south. During the withdrawal the brigade fired in support of 31st Division on 12 April (the Battle of Hazebrouck), and completed the withdrawal at 06.30 on 13 April. It was then ordered to move further south and join XV Corps, during which it was able to render occasional help to 4th Guards Bde of 31st Division, which was fighting desperately in front of Hazebrouck. On 14 April CXIX AFA Bde marched to Grand Hasard and reported to 57th (2nd WL) DA, firing about 5000 rounds during the day. Next day it joined 1st Australian Division, which had been rushed up from the Somme to relieve 4th Gds Bde. At 15.00 on 15 April the enemy made an attack on Vieux-Berquin and CXIX's batteries engaged with every round they had, the BAC rushing up further supplies. The attack was held, and the Germans spent 16 April preparing a stronger effort with more artillery. These attacks began at 08.30 on 17 April and became general by 10.00. Each attack was stopped by a 'hurricane' of fire from the Australian infantry and the artillery. The German artillery began a new bombardment at 15.30 and their infantry attempted to leave their trenches to renew the attack at 17.30, with disastrous results. The German advance on Hazebrouck was ended, though the battle continued in other sectors until the end of the month.

=== Summer 1918 ===
On 22 April CXIX AFA Bde reverted to 57th (2nd WL) DA, and was then under 29th Division from 29 April with Lt-Col Paterson commanding the left group comprising CXIX and CCLXXXV AFA Bdes in the absence of the division's own artillery. The front was now quiet and the batteries returned to their normal routine of registration and harassing fire. D (H) Battery was shelled by heavy guns on 2 May, without serious damage, and moved with C Bty to new camouflaged positions next day. On 4 May 1st Border Regiment raided enemy lines, supported by CXIX and two other brigades under Paterson's command. On 8 May CXIX AFA Bde came under the tactical command of 38th (Welsh) DA (covering 29th Division) for the first time in a year. On 16 May 29th DA returned and took over, with CXIX AFA Bde in the centre of the divisional front. The front was generally quiet, though B Battery was heavily shelled with 'Yellow Cross' (Mustard gas) on 15 May, and there were occasional raids to support, by 2nd SWB on 21 May, by 1st King's Own Scottish Borderers on 'Tern Farm' on 26 May, an operation by 86th Infantry Bde on 2/3 June to advance the line by a few hundred yards, and the capture of 'Lug Farm' on 18/19 June. 29th Division began to be relieved from 22 June and CXIX AFA Brigade moved back to a rest area at Lynde on the night of 24/25 June.

After a period of rest and overhaul, CXIX AFA Bde returned to XV Corps on 11 July, being attached to 9th (Scottish) Division. It was preparing gun positions near Méteren until 17 July, then was 'in action' with the division, with Bde HQ near Caëstre. The batteries began registering their guns on Hoegnacker Mill and other targets on Outtersteene Ridge in front. Fourth Army launched the Allies' Hundred Days Offensive with the Battle of Amiens on 8 August, but even before that the Germans had been making small withdrawals in front of Second Army. XV Corps began probing forwards, gaining ground east of Vieux Berquin and south of Méteren on the night of 11/12 August. Any further advance by the corps would be hampered by the enemy position on Outtersteene Ridge. 9th (S) and 29th Divisions were ordered to prepare an operation to take this, with the Scots of 27th Infantry Bde tasked with taking Hoegnacker Mill. This attack was supported by five RFA brigades: L and LI of 9th (S) DA with CXIII, CXIX and CLXXXVI AFA Bdes. Instead of a normal dawn assault, the attack was set for the unusual time of 11.00, and the advance was screened by a creeping barrage containing a large proportion of smoke shells. The gunners of CXIX Bde helped to prepare forward gun positions for CXIII Bde, and the brigade sent its own 'flank guns' forward on 14 August. The assault was launched on 18 August and the barrage was extremely effective. 27th Brigade 'went over like a pack of hounds and were consequently difficult to stop'. Hoegnacker Mill was secured by 11.20, and all objectives by 12.10. Including 'SOS' calls in the afternoon, CXIX AFA Bde fired 8000 rounds during the day.

There was then a comparative lull on Second Army's front, though on occasions infantry patrols of 29th Division were able to push the front forward against slight resistance, regaining the old 'GHQ Line' on 3–4 September and recapturing Ploegsteert behind a barrage on 5 September. Otherwise the field artillery carried out routine harassing fire and exchanges of fire with enemy batteries. 29th Division was replaced by 31st Division on 6 September, but 29th DA and CXIX AFA Bde remained in position.

=== Final advance in Flanders ===
CXIX AFA Brigade was withdrawn from the line for rest on 9 September. It returned to the front on 21 September when along with 29th DA (both administered by II Corps) it reinforced the Belgian army for the great Allied offensive of 28 September (Second Army was now part of the Army Group commanded by King Albert of the Belgians). Two batteries of CXIX AFA Bde were attached to 3rd Belgian Division, and two to 9th Belgian Division. The batteries reconnoitred their assigned positions and transported up ammunition by rail. They manned their guns on 27 September but remained silent until they opened a sudden bombardment at Zero (05.30) next morning (the Fifth Battle of Ypres). Despite torrential rain the Belgian attack was successful, capturing Houthulst Forest, Langemark and Poelcapelle, taking many prisoners and guns, after which the brigade moved up close to Langemark.

After this operation the brigade moved on 4–5 October to join XIX Corps, being attached to 35th Division, which had continued to advance over open country but was now being held up by lack of artillery. The division reorganised for a set-piece attack as part of the Battle of Courtrai. With lines of supply becoming stretched, ammunition was running short, so CXIX Bde sent waggons back to its old battery positions in II Corps' area to salvage as many unused shells as they could find. The batteries manned their positions on the night of 13 October and began firing the barrage at 05.30, with CXIX Bde extending the barrage out to a depth of 3,000 yards (2,700 m). The infantry attack was successful and the batteries limbered up and went forward to engage the crossings of the River Lys over which the enemy were withdrawing. Gunners of CXIX Bde and a heavy battery turned captured guns round and added their fire against the retreating Germans. By 16.20 Bde HQ was at Moorsele. Next day the brigade arranged a barrage to help 104th Infantry Bde capture the high ground at Schoen Water. On 16 October it fired to help 106th Infantry Bde to advance as far as the Lys, which the division's patrols crossed next day. On the night of 17/18 October 35th DA and CXIX AFA Bde fired a barrage to cover the Royal Engineers (REs) bridging the river in the dark. Next morning it covered the infantry as they consolidated a line beyond the river, and CXIX Bde HQ crossed on 19 October and established itself alongside 104th Infantry Bde HQ at the monastery of Marke. By now large numbers of liberated civilians were emerging from cover. On 20 October C Bty sent a 2-gun section forward with each battalion of 104th Infantry Bde, who advanced in open order without any other artillery support. When resistance stiffened in the afternoon the other batteries advanced and fired a barrage enabling 106th Infantry Bde to advance along the high ground.

On 21 October CXIX AFA Bde drew its guns out of action as 41st Division took over the advance from 35th Division. Lieutenant-Col Paterson went on leave to Paris, but after just three days' rest the brigade was ordered up under the command of Maj W Roberts, OC of C Bty, to join 41st DA. It took part in four-brigade barrage for the division's tricky action at Ooteghem on 25–26 October, in which it advanced to the River Scheldt and took the village of Heersteet. 41st Division was now relieved, and CXIX AFA Bde was sent to the waggon lines in the rear from 27 to 29 October before rejoining 35th Division for the action at Tieghem on 31 October. The artillery support comprised CLVII and CLIX Bdes of 35th DA and CXIX Bde, all pushed well forward to Ooteghem, and the 6-inch howitzers of 10th Brigade, Royal Garrison Artillery, also pushed up close to the front. The heavy artillery further back fired a smokescreen to shield the attacking troops from German batteries across the Scheldt. 104th Infantry Bde launched its assault at 05.25, behind the best barrage its men had ever seen, and by 06.20 they had taken the line of villages that formed its first objective, including the Scheldt bridges at Rugge. There was then a pause of 2 hours, during which CXIX and CLIX Bdes moved up to positions west of Tieghem. They received some shelling but there were few casualties and both brigades were in position by 08.10. From here they fired a smoke barrage to shield the further advance along the west bank of the river, which began at 08.45. The villages of the final objective were secured by 09.55 and the remaining enemy west of the river were seen retreating north to Oudenaarde. The infantry exploited their success during the afternoon.

35th Division was relieved on 1/2 November and CXIX AFA Bde was back at the waggon lines 4–6 November. Second Army began planning for an assault crossing of the Scheldt on 11 November, but patrols of XIX Corps then made an unopposed crossing on the night of 8/9 November, showing that the Germans were in full retreat. The divisions of XIX Corps set off in pursuit as soon as the REs had thrown bridges over the river, and their advanced guards met little opposition. CXIX AFA Brigade crossed on 10 November and went into billets in Berchem that night. The leading troops of 35th Division had reached Grammont on the River Dendre when the Armistice with Germany came into effect at 11.00 on 11 November. Lieutenant-Col Paterson had a rum ration issued to his men in celebration.

=== Post-Armistice ===
CXIX AFA Brigade moved to Blandain, west of Tournai, on 16 November and learned that it was to accompany 8th Division in the march towards the German frontier. However, it remained at Blandain until 18 December, when 8th Division moved to the Ath–Enghien area and went into winter quarters. CXIX Brigade HQ was established at Attre and the batteries and BAC were scattered to surrounding villages. Demobilisation got began during gte winter, and by 3 January 1919 the average battery strength had fallen to 120, making meaningful training impossible. A large number of horses were sent to England to be sold in February. Having commanded CXIX Bde throughout its active service, Lt-Col P.J. Paterson was posted to England on 10 March and Maj W. Roberts took command of the brigade, which was reduced to cadre strength on 20 April. On 13 June three-quarters of the brigade's remaining personnel were sent via Lille to the UK to be demobilised. The remaining equipment guards with the stores and vehicles were embarked at Antwerp on 17–18 June and were sent to Sheffield (BHQ and C Bty) and Leeds (A, B & D Btys) to be disbanded.

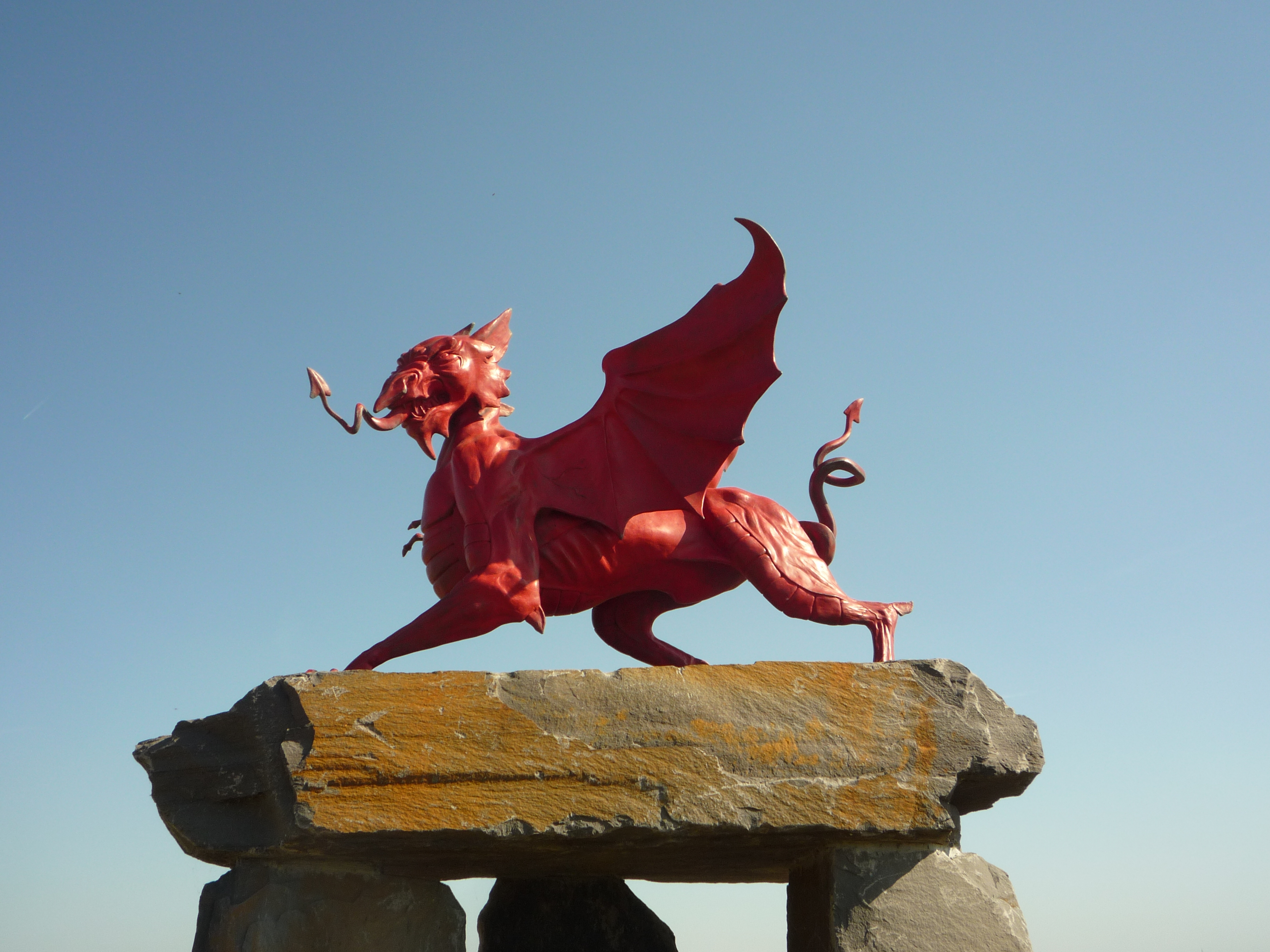
The Red Dragon of Wales atop the Cromlech of stones at the Welsh Memorial Park, Ypres.

== Memorials ==
A white marble memorial plaque to the dead of 38th (Welsh) Divisional Artillery, with the RA badge above and the division's dragon badge below, was placed in Cardiff City Hall after the war. It was later moved to its present location in Llandaff Cathedral.

Red dragon sculptures commemorating the service of the 38th (Welsh) Division have been erected at the Mametz Wood Memorial (1987) and at Welsh Memorial Park, Ypres, on Pilckem Ridge (2014).
