= Edward Bradbury =

Edward Bradbury may refer to:

- Edward Kinder Bradbury (1881–1914), English soldier, recipient of the Victoria Cross
- Edward P. Bradbury, pen name of Michael Moorcock (born 1939), English writer
