= L (Néry) Battery Royal Horse Artillery =

British Army artillery battery

- Active: 4 October 1809 – present
- Country: United Kingdom
- Allegiance: Hon East India Coy (till 1858); United Kingdom (post 1858)
- Branch: British Army
- Type: Artillery
- Part of: 1st Regiment Royal Horse Artillery
- Anniversaries: Néry Day 1 September
- Battle honours: Ubique

L (Néry) Battery Royal Horse Artillery is the Tactical Group Battery of 1st Regiment Royal Horse Artillery.

== Previous role ==
The Battery became a Tactical Group Battery in 2005, with its guns firing their last rounds in Otterburn in February 2005.

- 2006 – L/N (Nery) Battery (The Eagle Troop) RHA split to reform separately as L and N Batteries. N Battery returned to 3 RHA to become their Tactical Group Battery and L Battery became 1 RHA's Tactical Group Battery – supporting the HCR, 1st Mech Bde Formation Reconnaissance Regiment.

=== Battery structure ===
L (Nery) Battery are known as a Tactical Group Battery and they consist of approximately 30 personnel:

- Battery Commanders FOO Party
- FOO Party A - Commanded by the Battery Captain
- FOO Party B - Commanded by a captain.
- Battery Commanders Tac Group

=== Equipment ===
L (Nery) Battery are currently equipped with the Warrior OPV and recently the AJAX tracked armoured fighting vehicle. They have Forward Air Controllers in each team.

== History ==
=== Formation ===
L (Nery) Battery were formed in India in 1809 as 3rd Troop The Bengal Horse Artillery.

=== 19th century ===
- 1857 - The Battery was distinguished with service in the Indian Mutiny, when in action on 7 July 1857, Gunner William Connolly who was repeatedly injured, refused to leave his post on the gun. He was awarded L Battery's first Victoria Cross.
- 1889 - the Battery was renamed L Battery Royal Horse Artillery.

=== World War One ===
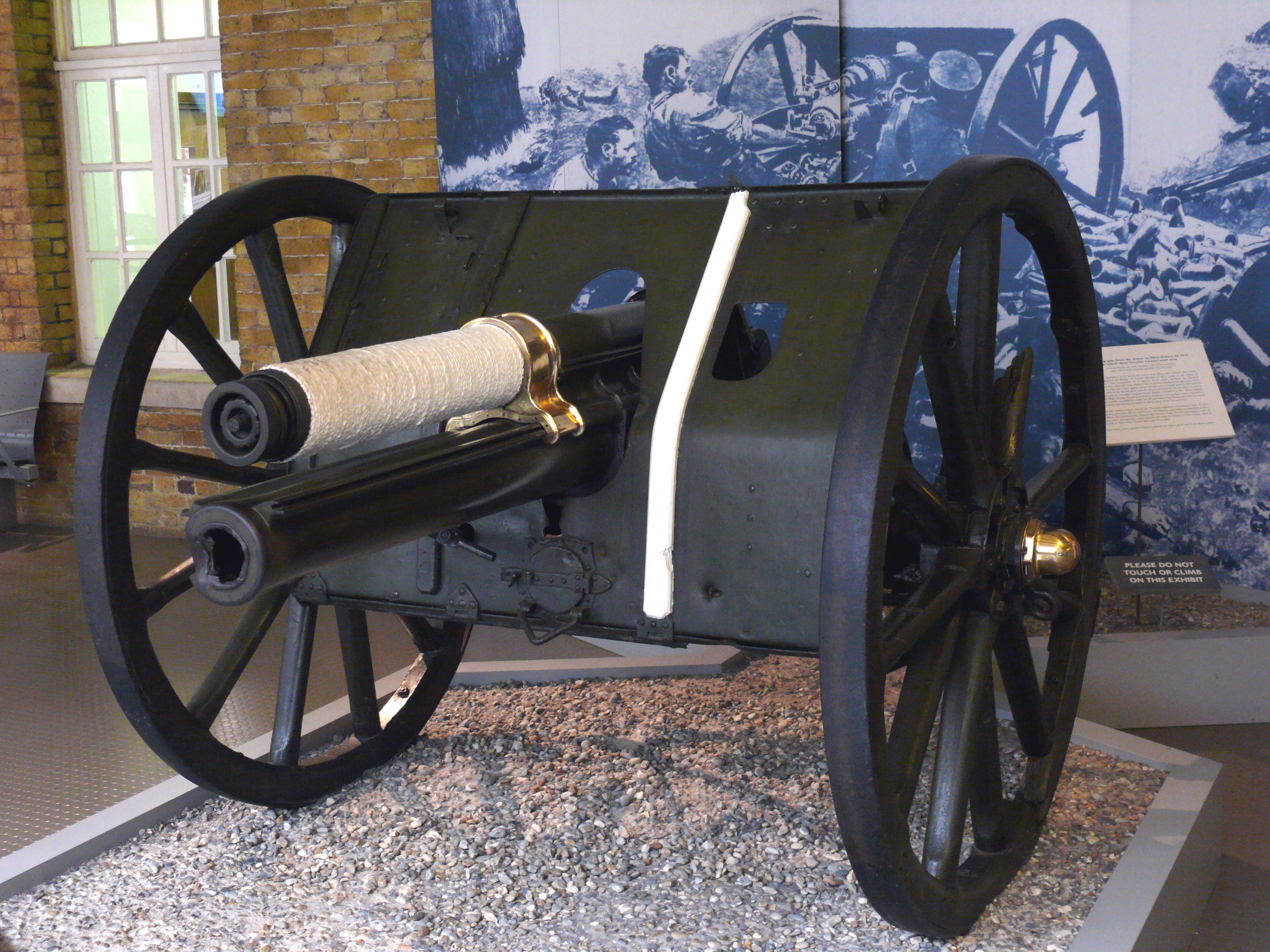
The Néry Gun at the Imperial War Museum in London.

- 1914 – L Battery accompanied the BEF to France.
- 1914 - The Action at Néry. On the morning of 1 September 1914 the German 4th Cavalry Division attacked 1st Cavalry Brigade and L Battery, who had been camped in the village of Néry. In the action that followed, L Battery, less for one gun, was all but destroyed. The 13-pounder gun manned by Captain Bradbury, WO2 Dorrell, Sergeant Nelson, and Gunners Osbourne and Darbyshire, managed to keep the single gun in action against the three German Batteries located a thousand yards away. The Artillery fire put down by this gun allowed the 1st Cavalry Brigade to deliver a successful Counter attack. For this action Captain Bradbury, WO2 Dorrell, Sergeant Nelson, were all awarded the Victoria Cross.

=== World War Two ===
L (Nery) Battery served with distinction during WW2 in North Africa and Italy.

=== Cold War ===
L (Nery) Battery also deployed to Palestine, Malaya, and Cyprus and Northern Ireland.

== Recent and current conflicts ==
=== Northern Ireland ===
L (Nery) Battery deployed to Northern Ireland.

=== Persian Gulf War ===
Elements of the Battery also served in Operation Granby in the Persian Gulf.

=== Balkan Wars ===
- 1993 – L Battery joined 1 RHA in Assaye Barracks Tidworth Camp when 2 Regt RA (formerly 2 RHA) disbanded.
- 1999- The Battery amalgamated with N Battery (The Eagle Troop) RHA to become L/N (Néry) Battery (The Eagle Troop) RHA.

The Battery served in the Balkans.

=== Operation TELIC in Iraq ===
- 2004 - L / N Battery served in Iraq on Op TELIC 4.

== See also ==
- British Army
- Royal Artillery
- Royal Horse Artillery
- List of Royal Artillery Batteries

== Bibliography ==
- Clarke, W.G. (1993). Horse Gunners: The Royal Horse Artillery, 200 Years of Panache and Professionalism. Woolwich: The Royal Artillery Institution. ISBN 09520762-0-9.
