= Horace Sewell =

British Army officer

Brigadier-General Horace Sewell CMG DSO & Bar
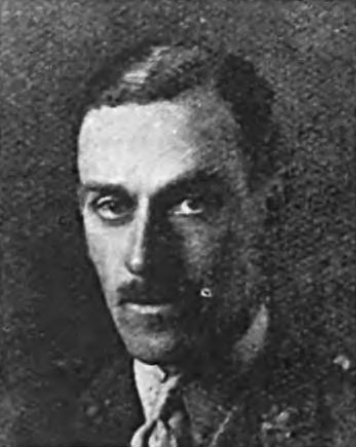
- Born: 10 February 1881
- Died: 25 December 1953 (aged 72)
- Education: Harrow School; Trinity College, Cambridge
- Spouse: Emma King (m. 1916)
- Military career
- Allegiance: United Kingdom
- Branch: British Army
- Service years: 1900–
- Nickname: Sambo
- Unit: 4th Dragoon Guards
- Commands: 1st Cavalry Brigade; 7th Queen's Own Hussars; Midland Cavalry Brigade
- Conflicts: 1907-8 Nigeria Expedition; First World War; Battle of Mons; First Battle of the Aisne (WIA); First Battle of Ypres; Second Battle of Ypres (WIA); Battle of the Somme; Battle of Arras; Battle of Cambrai
- Awards: Mentioned in dispatches x 2 Legion of Honour (France)

Brigadier-General Horace Somerville Sewell, CMG, DSO* (10 February 1881 – 25 December 1953) was a British Army officer who served in World War I. He was one of the few officers of African descent to serve in the British army during the conflict.

== Biography ==
Horace Sewell was born in Wales on 10 February 1881; he was the third son of Henry Sewell, who was in turn the eldest son of the prominent Jamaica planter William Sewell and the mulatto former slave Mary McCrea. Henry Sewell returned to England, where he married and eventually settled at Steephill Castle near Ventnor on the Isle of Wight, but he inherited his father's Jamaica plantation "empire" in 1872, and subsequently divided his time between England and Jamaica, eventually relocating permanently back to the island.

Horace Sewell was educated at Harrow School and Trinity College, Cambridge, before joining the 4th Royal Irish Dragoon Guards in 1900. His regimental nickname was "Sambo", apparently a reference to his Jamaican roots.

Sewell was seconded to the West African Frontier Force for three years from 1907, with a promotion to Captain following soon after the start of the assignment. By the outbreak of World War I in 1914, his regiment was serving in the British Expeditionary Force; he was quickly promoted to major, and took command the regiment as a temporary lieutenant-colonel in March 1915. In April 1918, he was promoted to command the 1st Cavalry Brigade of the British Army, which he led until the end of the Great War. General Sewell was a highly decorated soldier, earning the DSO in 1915, the French Légion d'honneur in 1916, a bar to his DSO for service at the Battle of Cambrai in 1917, and the CMG in 1919, as well as being twice wounded and five times mentioned in dispatches. In 1916 he married the daughter of the New York gypsum magnate Jerome Berre King, Emma.

After the war he commanded the 7th Queen's Own Hussars until 1923 and was promoted on 9 January 1924 to colonel, with seniority backdated to 1 January 1922. Subsequently he commanded the Midland Cavalry Brigade of the Territorial Army until 1928. He retired from the army on 12 May 1928 and was granted the honorary rank of brigadier general.

During World War II, Brigadier-General Sewell was attached to the British Information Services in New York . He matriculated his coat of arms in 1940 and settled at the medieval Tysoe Manor in Warwickshire, but latterly spent much of his time on Jamaica, where he served as a Justice of the Peace.

Brigadier-General Sewell apparently passed for white, and evidence of his mixed-race heritage surprised modern researchers, but his nickname suggests that his ancestry was known to his comrades and subordinates, and he was recognized as "black" by Americans who he came in contact with during his World War II posting.
