= Muziic =

Defunct online music streaming service based on YouTube integration

- Developer: David Nelson
- Release: February 25, 2009
- Operating system: Microsoft Windows
- Available in: Multilingual
- Type: Media player
- License: Proprietary
- Website: www.muziic.com

Muziic is a media player, FLV encoder and related website, designed to directly access Flash Video media files from YouTube, without the user having to visit the file's display page on the YouTube website. Muziic can also refer to the organization that created and maintains the project. As the name suggests, the primary focus of Muziic is on accessing YouTube's music resources.

Muziic was created by then-fifteen-year-old David Nelson and his father Mark Nelson. David was responsible for the software development, and Mark organized the project as a company. After a year of development, the pair set up a website, www.muziic.com (launched on 25 February 2009) and debuted the Muziic Player software.

The service is able to search, sort, play, and create playlists of YouTube videos. It also has an upload function, allowing users to encode media files as Flash Video and add them to YouTube. Currently, the Muziic Player is available for Microsoft Windows operating system (XP and Vista) and is dependent on the Flash Player plug-in for Internet Explorer. The program also has Apple Inc. iPhone and iPod Touch versions. Within twenty-four hours of launch, Muziic for iPhone had become the 29th most popular free music app in the iPhone App Store. Muziic is also a version of the iPad. The Muziic website provides a degree of "social networking" functionality for Muziic users as well, including a community-generated directory of YouTube videos, playlists, and channels. Muziic also maintains its own YouTube channel and has a presence on Myspace, Facebook, and Twitter.
