= Dave Nelson (Australian footballer) =

Australian rules footballer, born 1910

Personal information
- Full name: David Joseph Nelson
- Born: 26 February 1910; Collingwood, Victoria
- Died: 12 April 1986 (aged 76); Hawthorn, Victoria
- Height: 173 cm (5 ft 8 in)
- Weight: 65 kg (143 lb)

Playing career^{1}
Years	Club	Games (Goals)
1928	Coburg (VFA)	1 (0)
1929	North Melbourne	7 (2)
- ^{1} Playing statistics correct to the end of 1929.

David Joseph Nelson (26 February 1910 – 12 April 1986) was an Australian rules footballer who played with North Melbourne in the Victorian Football League (VFL).

== Family ==
The son of David Guy Nelson (1870–1970), and Ellen Nelson (1880–1953), née Tighe, David Joseph Nelson was born in Collingwood, Victoria on 26 February 1910.

He married Patricia Mary McDonald (1917–1997) in 1939.

== Military service ==
Nelson later served in the Australian Army during World War II.

== Death ==
He died at his residence in Hawthorn, Victoria on 12 April 1986.
