= David Nelson (mathematician) =

English mathematician (born 1938)

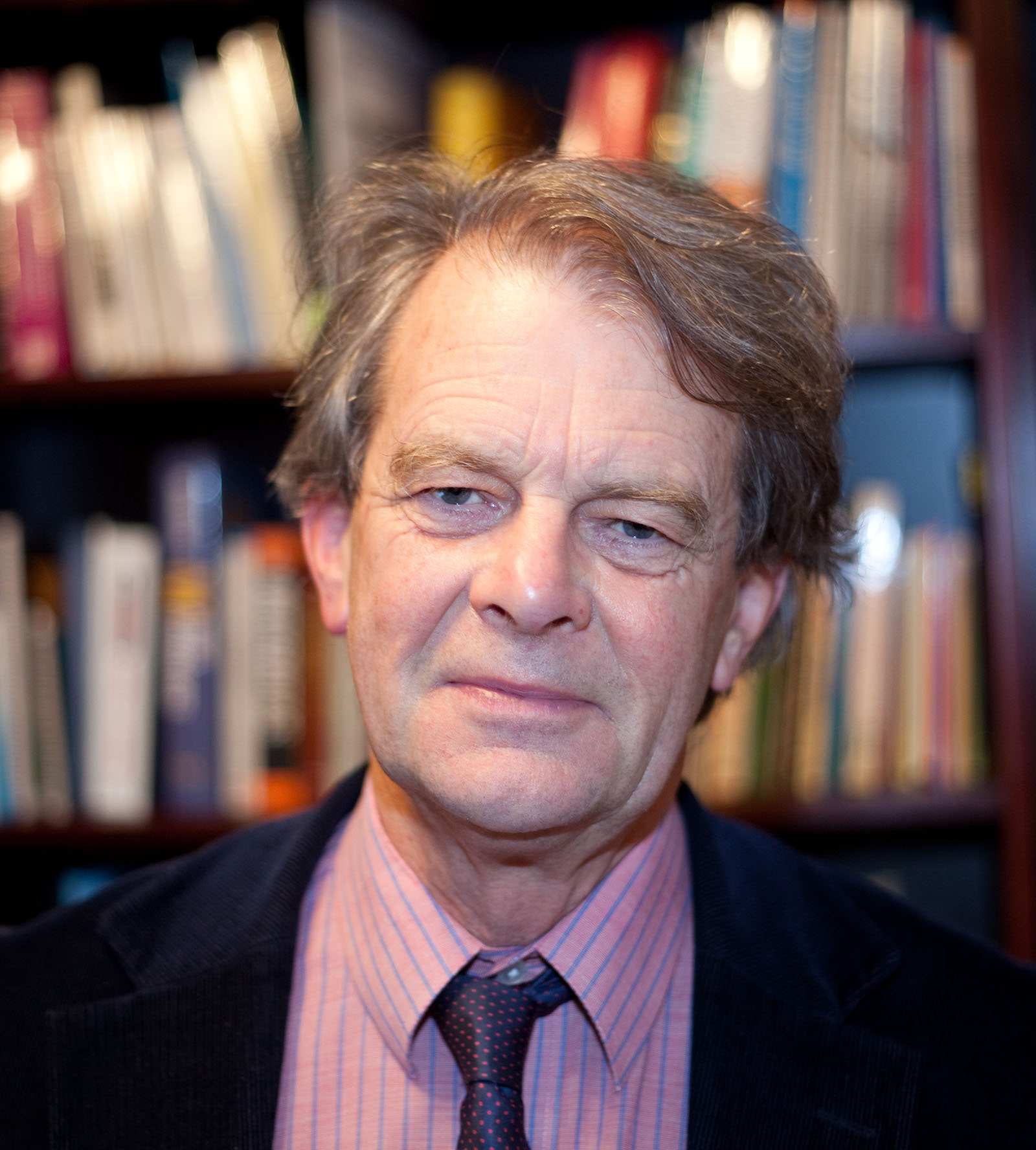
- Born: 1938 (age 87–88)
- Education: Christ's College, Cambridge University

David Nelson (born 1938) (also known as R. D. Nelson) is an English mathematician. He is a Chartered Mathematician and a Fellow of the Institute of Mathematics and its Applications.

Nelson was educated at Calday Grange Grammar School, Cheshire, and won an open mathematical scholarship to Christ's College, Cambridge.

After postgraduate work in mathematical logic at Cambridge and Bristol universities, he entered the teaching profession.

From 1981 to 2001 he was a lecturer in education at the University of Manchester, specializing in mathematics education and the history of mathematics. From 1990 to 2001 he developed and gave courses in mathematical cognition, mathematics education and the history of mathematics in the Department of Mathematics. From 1993 to 2001 he founded and chaired the inter-departmental Maths Education Research Group Seminar (MERG). He is now an honorary visitor in the Department of Mathematics.

Nelson is editor of the Penguin Dictionary of Mathematics (fourth edition, 2008). Originally published in 1989, the book has been translated into Chinese and a Japanese edition is being prepared. He has been a mathematics advisory editor to Penguin Books since 1971, commissioning, advising on and editing over 80 new titles.

His book Multicultural Mathematics (1993, Oxford University Press), with George Gheverghese Joseph and Julian Williams, presents a rationale for teaching mathematics from a multicultural standpoint, shows how the method can be applied within the core of any elementary curriculum and explores the educational and social benefits of such an approach.

Nelson's other books include The Penguin Dictionary of Statistics (2004), Extensions of Calculus (1990, Cambridge University Press), with Colin Goldsmith and Adventures with your Computer (1984, Penguin Books), with Lennart Rade, which presents sixteen mathematical activities and problem areas for students to explore by programming in BASIC on a microcomputer. It was also published in German and Japanese editions.

He has published journal papers on psychology, mathematics education, mathematics, and music.

He has lectured in Poland, Italy, France and the US, and, in 1995, at the invitation of the State Education Committee of the People's Republic of China, organized and led a three- week National Seminar on Mathematics Education to initiate reform of the Chinese national mathematics curriculum.

For many years he has been an A-level examiner and setter of papers, and was a chief examiner in mathematics for OCR (Oxford, Cambridge and RSA Examinations) from 1998 to 2001 and then a principal examiner in mathematics for CAIE (Cambridge Assessment International Education) from 2001 to 2016.

A former member of the National Youth Orchestra, his main recreations are playing the flute and piano, gardening and golf. His wife, Gillian, is a writer and a gardener. They have three children and nine grandchildren.
