= Néry =

- Commune
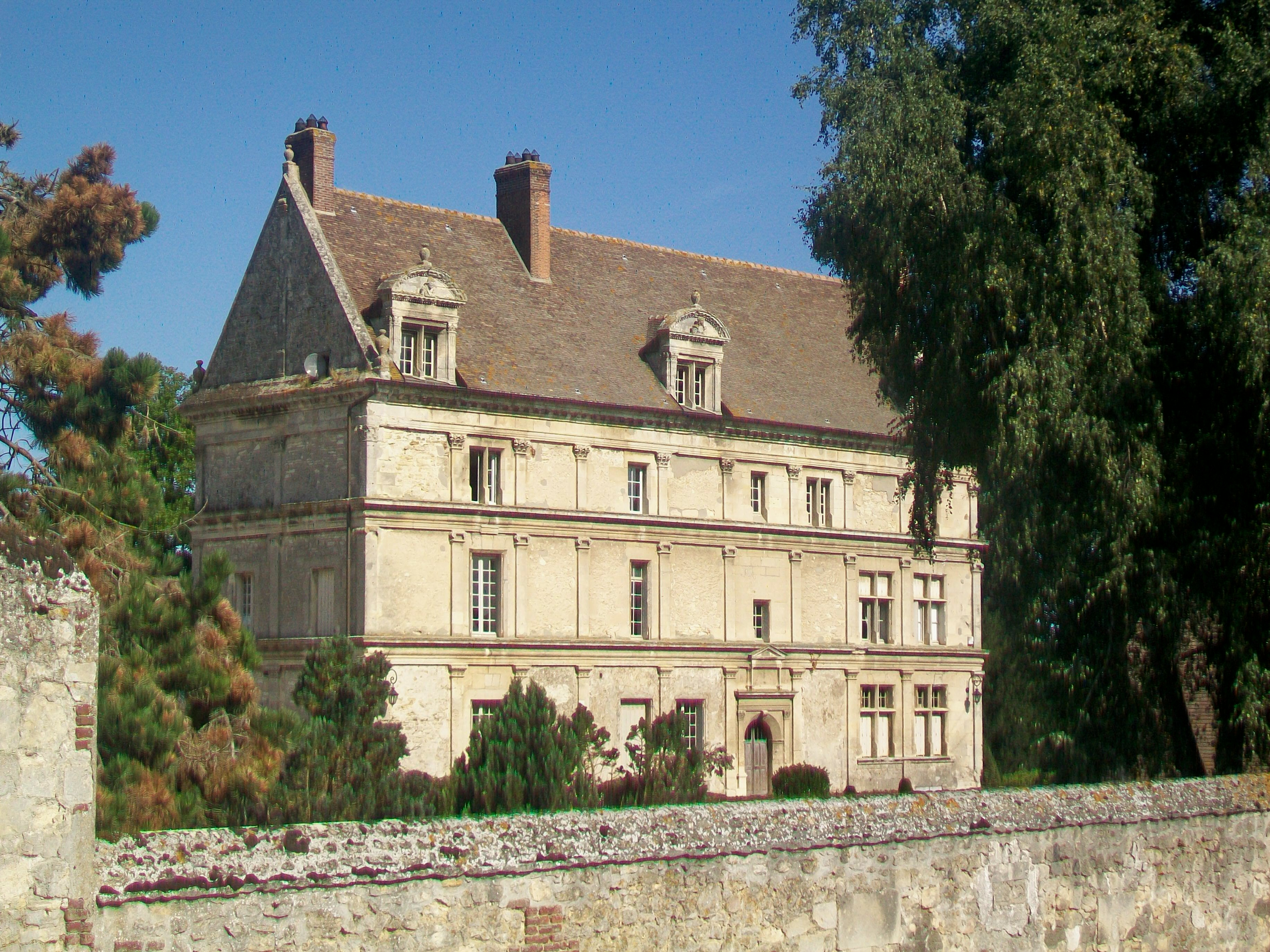
- The manor of Huleux in Néry
- Location of Néry
- Location within France Location within Hauts-de-France
- Coordinates: 49°16′56″N 2°46′45″E
- Country: France
- Region: Hauts-de-France
- Department: Oise
- Arrondissement: Senlis
- Canton: Crépy-en-Valois
- Intercommunality: CA Région de Compiègne et Basse Automne

Government
  - Mayor (2020–2026): Claude Picart
- Area^{1}: 16.34 km^{2} (6.31 sq mi)
- Elevation: 101 m (331 ft)
- Highest elevation: 154 m (505 ft)
- Lowest elevation: 37 m (121 ft)
- Population (2023): 670
  - Density: 41/km^{2} (110/sq mi)
- Time zone: UTC+01:00 (CET)
  - Summer (DST): UTC+02:00 (CEST)
- INSEE/Postal code: 60447 /60320
- ^{1} French Land Register data, which excludes lakes, ponds, glaciers > 1 km^{2} (0.386 sq mi or 247 acres) and river estuaries.

Néry (French pronunciation: [neʁi]) is a commune in the Oise department in northern France.

The commune includes the hamlets of Huleux, Vaucelles, and Verrines. The Church of Saint-Martin in Néry dates from 1140 with later additions. The Manoir de Huleux was built in 1550. In 719 AD, Néry was the scene of a battle in which Charles Martel defeated the Neustrians. At the start of World War I in 1914, a delaying action was fought in the village by part of the British Expeditionary Force.

== The Affair at Néry ==
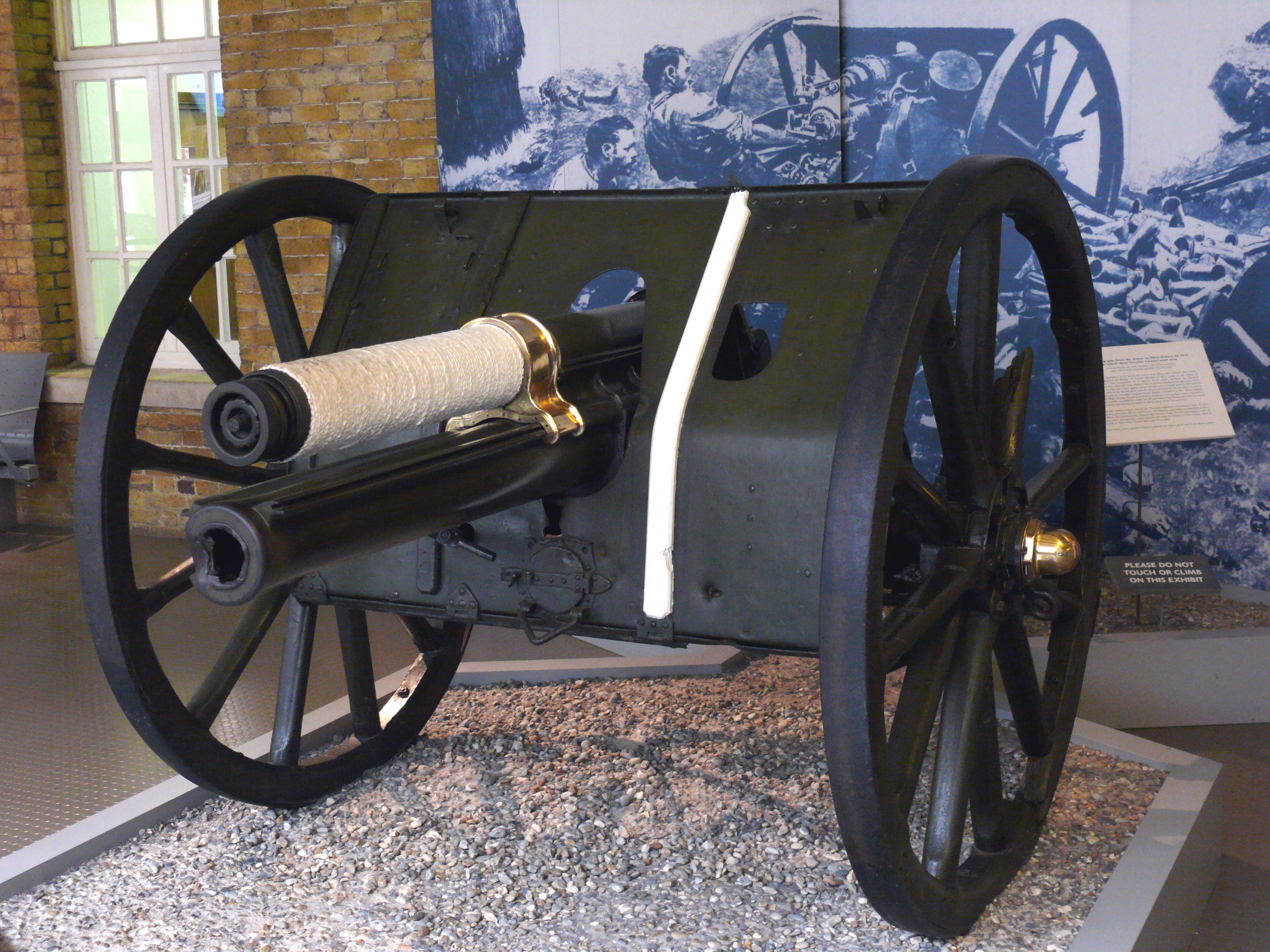
The Néry Gun at the Imperial War Museum, London

At dawn on 1 September 1914, the British 1st Cavalry Brigade and L Battery of the Royal Horse Artillery who had bivouacked at Néry, were surprised by the advancing German 4th Cavalry Division. The German attack was supported by 12 guns which devastated the British battery. However a single 13 pounder gun was kept firing, and together with the rifles and machine-guns of the Queen's Bays, held off the Germans long enough for elements of the 1st and 4th Cavalry Brigade to counterattack and drive away the attackers in disorder. The German division was withdrawn to the reserve corps; there were 135 British casualties. Three Victoria Crosses were awarded to L Battery (Edward Kinder Bradbury, George Thomas Dorrell and David Nelson), and the "Néry Gun" is preserved in the Imperial War Museum.

== See also ==
- Communes of the Oise department
