= David Nelson (software developer) =

American software developer

- Born: May 25, 1993 (age 32); Iowa, United States
- Occupations: Software developer, entrepreneur

David Nelson (born May 25, 1993) is an American software developer and CEO of Motion AI, an Artificial Intelligence software company.

== Muziic ==
In 2009, at age 15, following a report by CNN Nelson gained attention in the media for developing the Muziic streaming music application. The service garnered over 250 million listens worldwide. Muziic was controversial to some in the music industry because it allowed access to stream music videos, through YouTube, but aggregated and displayed the songs in a way geared toward listening and building playlists. Because this occurred prior to services like Spotify coming to the United States, free applications like this were rare and often illegal.

== FanRx ==
David later went on to found FanRx (formerly BandRx) in 2012, a social media software company for musicians and brands. The service gained over 225,000 subscribers and entered the Top 5 most popular music applications on Facebook.

In 2013, Nelson launched Mass Threat, a game development subsidiary of FanRx, catering to the music industry. Mass Threat has worked with Train, Fall Out Boy, Panic! at the Disco and Sia, among others, to develop and launch games geared toward their fans. Mass Threat games collectively have been downloaded over 5 million times, according to the company's website.

== Motion AI ==
In November 2015, Nelson unveiled Motion AI on Product Hunt, where it was number one for the day and earned a top spot in the all-time rankings. The company aims to bring Artificial Intelligence technologies to the masses by building a "UI for AI". In one of the fastest funding rounds in Chicago area history, Motion AI subsequently raised $700,000 in seed funding to expand the team and build out the product, as reported in the Chicago Tribune.

Motion AI was named one of Chicago's "50 Startups to Watch" in 2016.

== Personal life ==
In 2015, Nelson proposed to his girlfriend Chelsea on stage at a Train show in the Bahamas, following an introduction from Pat Monahan.
