= David Nelson (running back) =

American football player (born 1963)

David Leon Nelson (born November 23, 1963) is an American former professional football player who was a running back for the Minnesota Vikings of the National Football League (NFL). Born in Miami, he attended North Miami Beach High School and Heidelberg University before entering the NFL with Minnesota in 1984. He played two games for the Vikings, recording one rushing attempt for three yards and a kickoff return for zero yards.
