= George Thomas Dorrell =

English Victoria Cross recipient (1880–1971)

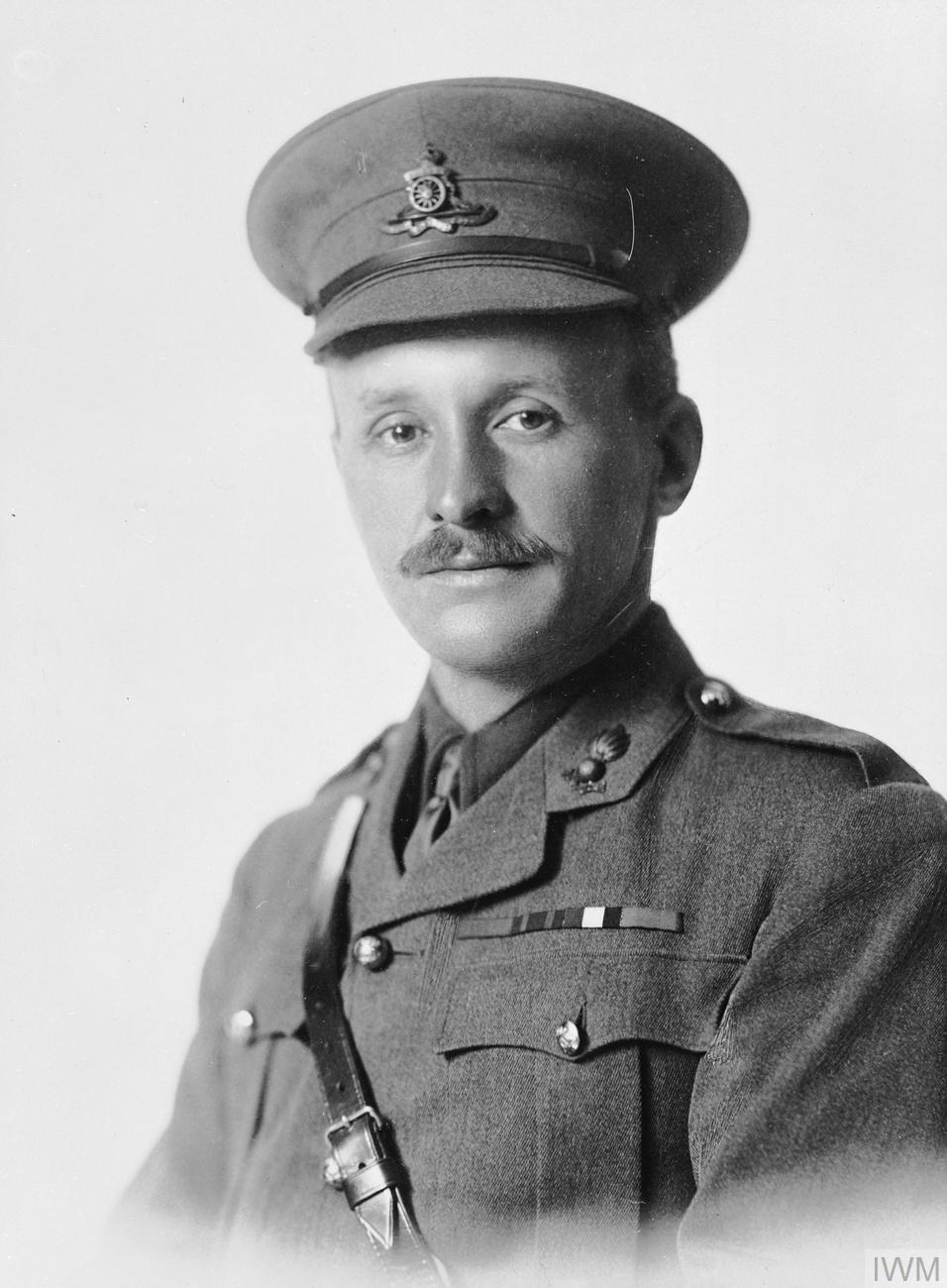
- Born: 7 July 1880; Paddington, Middlesex, England
- Died: 7 January 1971 (aged 90); Cobham, Surrey, England
- Burial place: Randall's Park Crematorium, Leatherhead
- Military career
- Allegiance: United Kingdom
- Branch: British Army; Territorial Army; Home Guard
- Service years: 1895–1926, 1941–1945
- Rank: Lieutenant-Colonel
- Units: Royal Horse Artillery; Royal Artillery; Home Guard
- Conflicts: Second Boer War; World War I World War II
- Awards: Victoria Cross; Member of the Order of the British Empire

Lieutenant-Colonel George Thomas Dorrell, VC, MBE (7 July 1880 – 7 January 1971) was an English recipient of the Victoria Cross, the highest and most prestigious award for gallantry in the face of the enemy that can be awarded to British and Commonwealth forces.

== Military career ==
Joining the British Army at the age of 15, Dorrell served in the Second Boer War.

He was 34 years old, and a Battery Sergeant Major in 'L' Battery, Royal Horse Artillery, British Army during World War I when the following deed took place for which he was awarded the VC.

=== Involvement in the Action at Néry ===
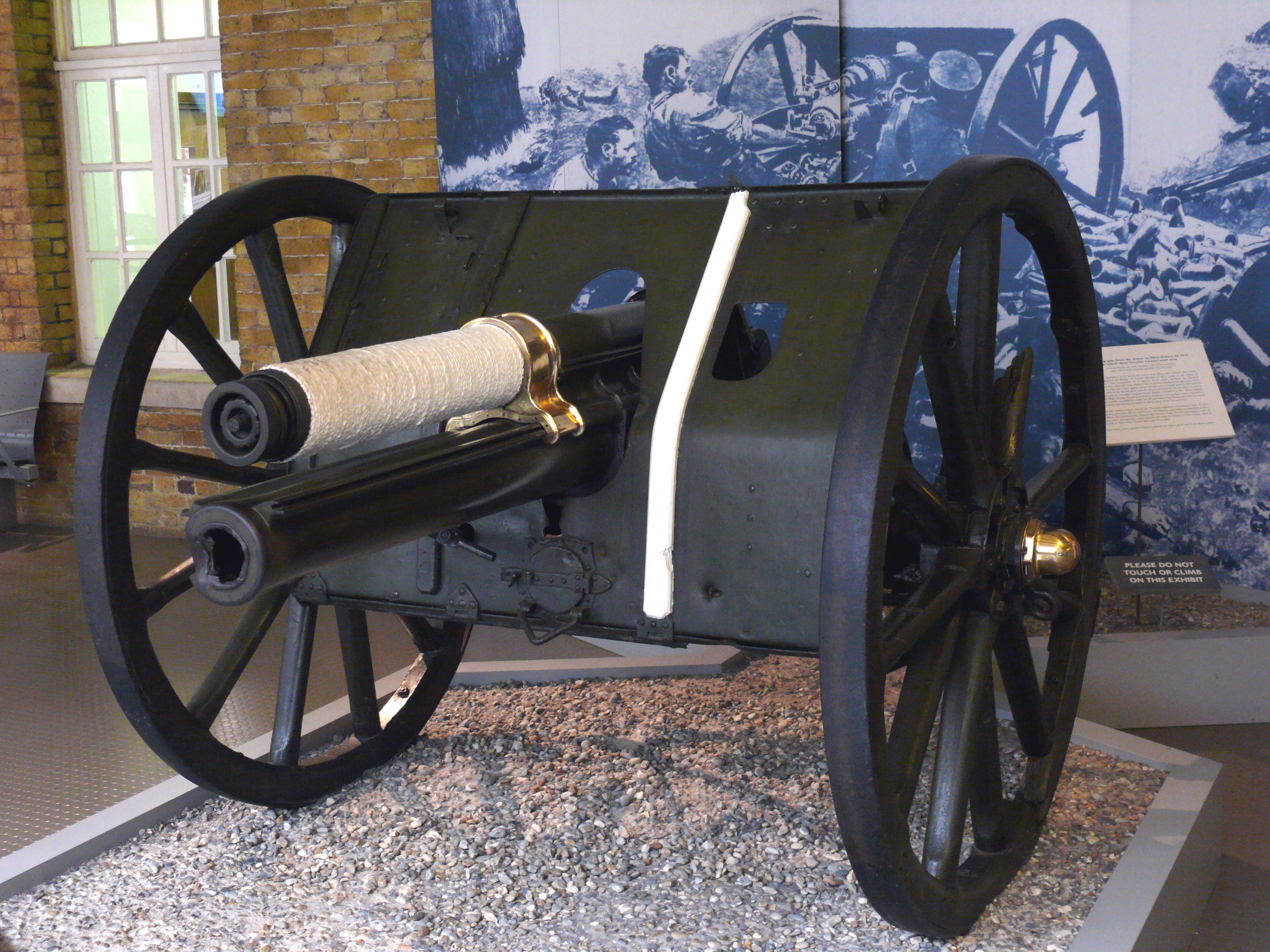
The Nery gun

On 1 September 1914, at Néry, France, during a fierce attack by the enemy, all the officers of 'L' Battery were either killed or wounded, including the officer (Edward Kinder Bradbury) in command, who, although having had one leg taken off by a shell, continued to direct the firing until he died. Battery Sergeant-Major Dorrell then took over command with the support of a sergeant (David Nelson) and continued to fire one of the guns until all the ammunition was expended.

=== Later career ===
As well as receiving the VC, Dorrell was commissioned as an officer. He returned to the Western Front in January 1916 as a Captain and officer commanding A Battery, 119th Brigade, Royal Field Artillery, in 38th (Welsh) Division. In early 1916 he regularly acted as commander of 119th Bde. In May 1916 his battery transferred to 122nd Bde.

He was appointed a Member of the Order of the British Empire (MBE) in the 1925 Birthday Honours.

As brevet lieutenant colonel, Dorrell served as a company commander in the Home Guard during World War II.

His Victoria Cross is displayed at the Imperial War Museum in London.

== Bibliography ==
- Gliddon, Gerald (2011) [1994]. 1914. VCs of the First World War. The History Press. ISBN 978-0752459080.
