= Edward Kinder Bradbury =

Recipient of the Victoria Cross

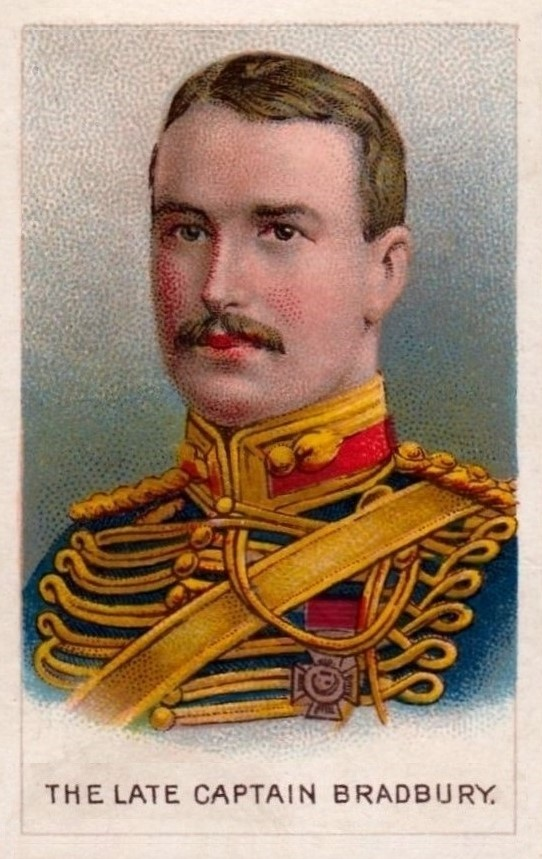
- Born: 16 August 1881; Altrincham, Cheshire
- Died: 1 September 1914 (aged 33); Néry, France
- Burial place: Nery Communal Cemetery
- Military career
- Allegiance: UK
- Branch: British Army
- Service years: 1900–1914 †
- Rank: Captain
- Units: Royal Horse Artillery
- Conflicts: Second Boer War; World War I: Retreat from Mons; Battle of Nery †
- Awards: Victoria Cross

Captain Edward Kinder Bradbury VC (16 August 1881 – 1 September 1914) was an English recipient of the Victoria Cross, the highest and most prestigious award for gallantry in the face of the enemy that can be awarded to British and Commonwealth forces.

Bradbury was an officer in the British Army during the First World War where as second-in-command of L Battery, Royal Horse Artillery he led the battery during an engagement at Néry during the Retreat from Mons on 1 September 1914, where he was killed in action. For the gallantry at Néry, he and two other men were awarded the Victoria Cross.

== Early career ==
Born in August 1881, in Altrincham, Cheshire, he was the son of James Kinder Bradbury and Grace Dowling. He attended the Royal Military Academy, Woolwich, as a cadet, passing out to join the Royal Artillery as a second lieutenant on 2 May 1900. He was promoted to full lieutenant on 3 April 1901, and in January 1902 was seconded for service with the Imperial Yeomanry in South Africa for the Second Boer War, and appointed a lieutenant with the 31st Battalion. The war ended six months later, and Bradbury resigned his appointment in the Imperial Yeomanry in October 1902, returning to the Royal Artillery, and left Port Natal for Aden on the SS Dominion the following month. He was posted to the 127th Battery RFA in 1904.

In early 1905 he was seconded to duties with the Foreign Office, during which time he appears to have served with the King's African Rifles. He returned to a regimental post in 1907, received his captaincy in 1910, and became an adjutant in February 1912, returning to normal duties in November.

Bradbury rode his horse "Sloppy Weather" in the 1909 Royal Artillery Gold Cup, coming third; another of his horses, "Hot Water", competed in the 1911 Punchestown Festival, again coming third.

== First World War ==
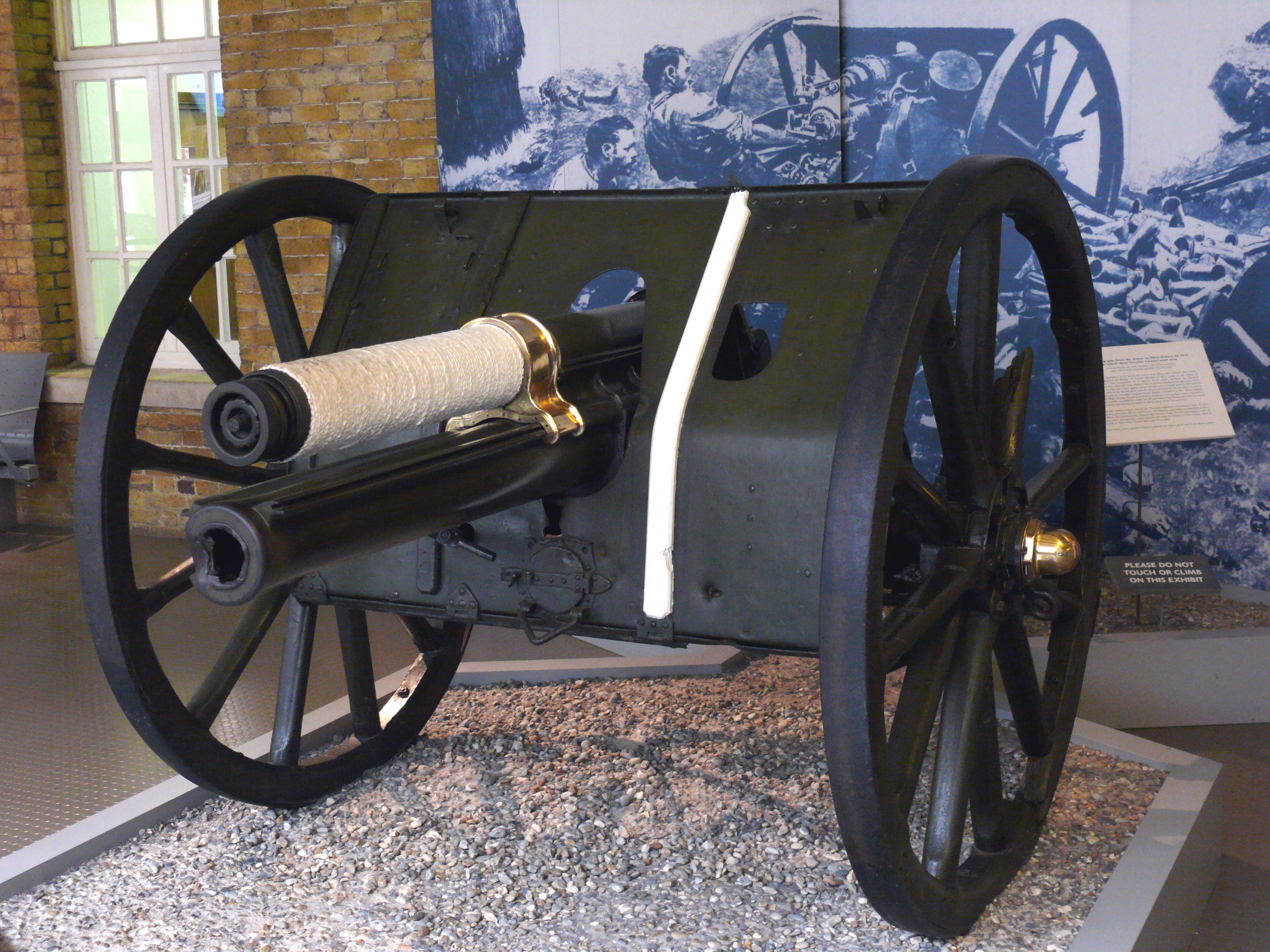
The Néry gun

Bradbury was 33 years old, and a captain in the 'L' Bty., Royal Horse Artillery (Royal Artillery), British Army during the First World War when the following deed took place for which he was awarded the VC.

On 1 September 1914 at Néry, France, during a fierce attack by the enemy, when all the officers of 'L' Battery were either killed or wounded, Captain Bradbury along with Sergeant Major Dorrell and Sergeant Nelson, continued the lone resistance against the German attack. Although having had one leg taken off by a shell while fetching ammunition, Bradbury continued to direct the fire of the battery until he died.

His Victoria Cross is displayed at the Imperial War Museum in London, England.

== Bibliography ==
- Gliddon, Gerald (2011) [1994]. 1914. VCs of the First World War. The History Press. ISBN 978-0752459080.
