= David Nelson (VC) =

Recipient of the Victoria Cross

David Nelson VC
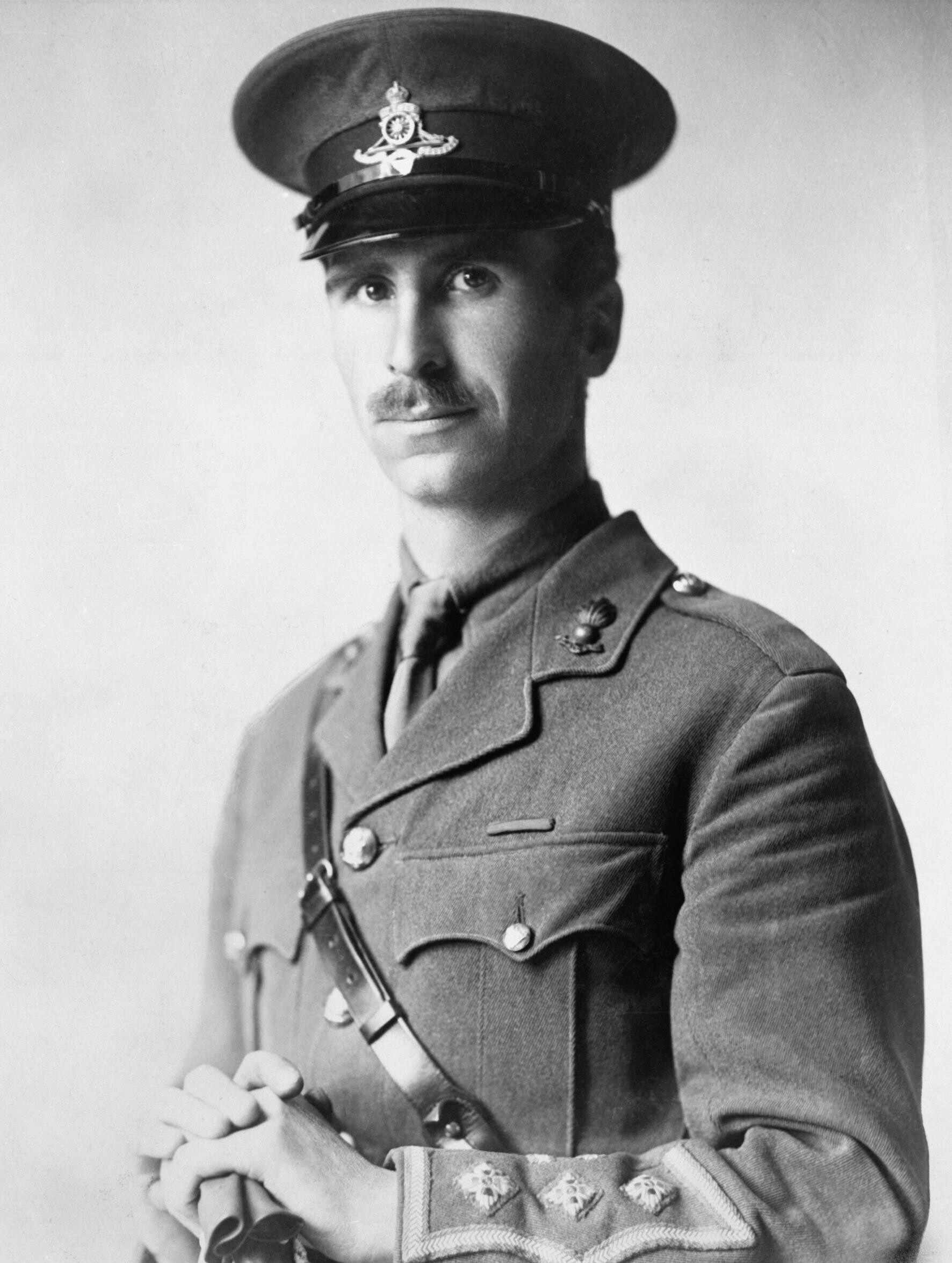
- Born: 3 April 1887; Stranooden, County Monaghan, Ireland, United Kingdom of Great Britain and Ireland
- Died: 8 April 1918 (aged 31); Lillers, French Third Republic
- Burial place: France
- Military career
- Allegiance: United Kingdom
- Branch: British Army
- Service years: 1904–1918
- Rank: Major
- Units: Royal Artillery
- Commands: D Battery, 59th Brigade
- Conflicts: World War I †
- Awards: Victoria Cross

Major David Nelson VC (3 April 1887 – 8 April 1918) was an Irish recipient of the Victoria Cross, the highest and most prestigious award for gallantry in the face of the enemy that can be awarded to British and Commonwealth forces.

== Military career ==
Nelson was born in Deraghland, Stranooden, County Monaghan, Ireland, to David Nelson and Mary Anne Black. He was 28 years old, and a sergeant in 'L' Battery, Royal Horse Artillery (RHA), British Army during World War I when the following deed took place for which he was awarded the VC.

On 1 September 1914 at Néry, France, Sergeant Nelson helped to bring the guns into action – with an officer (Edward Kinder Bradbury) and a warrant officer (George Thomas Dorrell) – under heavy fire and in spite of being severely wounded. He remained with the guns until all the ammunition was expended, although he had been ordered to retire to cover.

Nelson later achieved the rank of major. He was killed in action at Lillers, France, on 8 April 1918.

His Victoria Cross is displayed at the Imperial War Museum in London and his action at Néry is commemorated in a display at the Cart and Wagon Shed heritage centre in Shoeburyness.

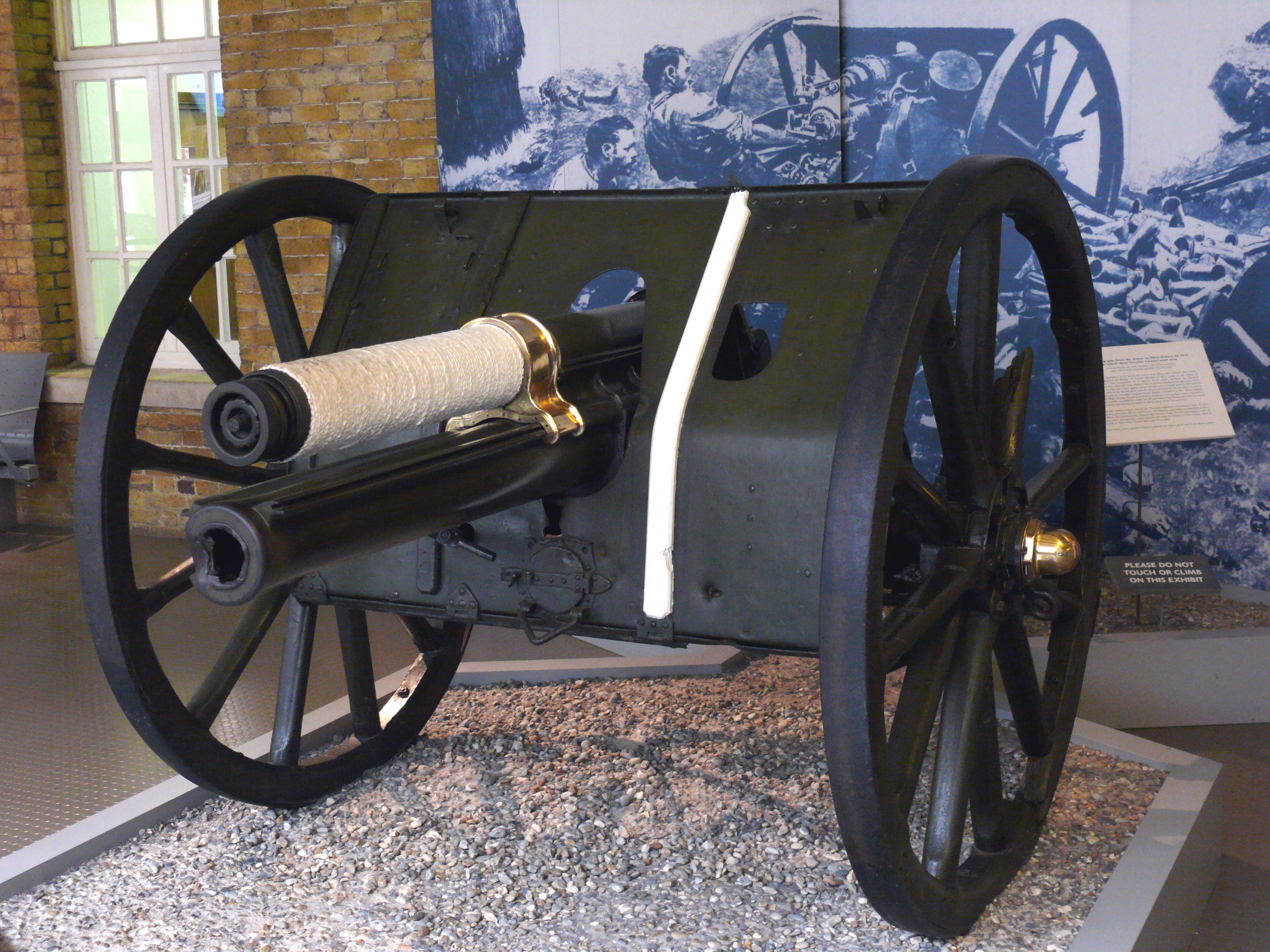
The Nery gun
