= Windsor =

Windsor may refer to:

== Places ==
- Detroit–Windsor, Michigan-Ontario, USA-Canada, North America; a cross-border metropolitan region

=== Australia ===
- Windsor, New South Wales
  - Municipality of Windsor, a former local government area
- Windsor, Queensland, a suburb of Brisbane, Queensland
  - Shire of Windsor, a former local government authority around Windsor, Queensland
  - Town of Windsor, a former local government authority around Windsor, Queensland
- Windsor Tablelands, a series of plateaus in Far North Queensland
- Windsor, South Australia, a small town in the northern Adelaide Plains
- Windsor Gardens, South Australia, a suburb of Adelaide
- Windsor, Victoria, a suburb of Melbourne
  - Windsor railway station, Melbourne

=== Canada ===
- Grand Falls-Windsor, Newfoundland and Labrador
- Windsor, Nova Scotia
- Windsor, Ontario
  - Windsor (Ontario provincial electoral district)
- Windsor, Quebec

=== New Zealand ===
- Windsor, Invercargill, suburb of Invercargill
- Windsor, North Otago, a township in North Otago

=== United Kingdom ===
- Windsor, Berkshire, a town near London
  - Windsor Castle, Windsor, Berkshire
  - Windsor Great Park
  - Windsor (UK Parliament constituency), the constituency centred on this town
  - Old Windsor, a village near Windsor
- Windsor, Belfast, a suburb
- Windsor, Cornwall, a hamlet
- Windsor, Lincolnshire, a hamlet

=== United States ===
- Windsor, California
- Windsor, Colorado
- Windsor, Connecticut
- Windsor Locks, Connecticut
  - Windsor Locks station
- Windsor, Alachua County, Florida
- Windsor, Indian River County, Florida
- Windsor, Georgia
- Windsor, Mercer County, Illinois
- Windsor, Shelby County, Illinois
- Windsor, Indiana
- Windsor, Kentucky
- Windsor, Maine
- Windsor, Massachusetts
- Windsor, Missouri
- Windsor, New Hampshire
- Windsor, New Jersey
- Windsor, New York, a town
  - Windsor (village), New York, within the town
- Windsor, North Carolina
- Windsor, North Dakota
- Windsor, Pennsylvania, a borough in York County
- Windsor, South Carolina
- Windsor, Vermont, a town
  - Windsor (CDP), Vermont, a census-designated place in the town
- Windsor County, Vermont
- Windsor, Virginia
- Windsor Heights, West Virginia
- Windsor, Wisconsin

== People ==
- House of Windsor, the house or dynasty of the present British Royal Family
- Windsor (surname), including a list of people with the name
- Windsor Davies, Welsh actor

== Title ==
- Duke of Windsor, formerly King Edward VIII of the United Kingdom
- Wallis Simpson (Wallis, Duchess of Windsor), wife of the Duke
- Earl of Windsor
- Viscount Windsor
- Baron Windsor

== Design ==
- Windsor cap, soft men's cap
- Windsor chair, type of chair with a solid wood seat and turned legs
- Windsor glasses, type of eyeglasses with circular eyerims and a thin frame
- Windsor knot, type of knot used to tie a necktie
- Windsor (typeface), a 1905 serif typeface that became popular in the 1970s

== Structures ==
- Windsor Castle, one of the homes of the monarch of Britain
- Windsor House (Belfast), a skyscraper in Northern Ireland
- Windsor Hotel (disambiguation), several places
- Windsor Park, a football stadium which is home to Linfield F.C. and the Northern Ireland football team
- Windsor station (disambiguation), stations of the name
- Windsor Theatre (disambiguation), cinemas and theatres with this name
- Windsor Tower (Madrid), a skyscraper in Madrid, Spain, which was destroyed in a fire in 2005
- Windsor (Port Penn, Delaware), a house listed on the U.S. National Register of Historic Places (NRHP)
- Windsor (Cascade, Virginia), a plantation complex listed on the NRHP

== Transport ==
- Windsor (American automobile), a defunct American automobile maker, 1929-1930
- Windsor (British automobile), produced 1924–1927
- Chrysler Windsor, a full-size car produced 1939–1966
- Windsor (sloop), a ship wrecked off the coast of Australia in 1816
- HMS Windsor, several Royal Navy ships
- HMCS Windsor, a Canadian submarine
- USS Windsor, two ships by this name serving during WWII
- Vickers Windsor, World War II British heavy bomber
- Windsor-class attack transport, a class of US Navy ships used to transport troops and their equipment
- Ford Windsor engine, a small-block V8 engine formerly produced by Ford Motor Company
- MG Windsor EV, an electric car rebadged from Baojun Yunduo

== Other uses ==
- The Windsors, UK sitcom
- Windsor (film), a 2016 film starring Barry Corbin
- Windsor (soil), the unofficial state soil of the U.S. state of Connecticut
- United States v. Windsor, a 2013 United States Supreme Court decision concerning same-sex marriage
- Castle Windsor, part of the Castle Project (an open source application framework)
- Windsor core, a version of the Athlon 64 CPU
- "Windsor" (The Architecture the Railways Built), a 2021 television episode
- "Windsor" (The Crown), a 2016 television episode

== See also ==
- New Windsor (disambiguation)
- Old Windsor
- Windsor Castle (disambiguation)
- Windsor Hills (disambiguation)
- Windsor Historic District (disambiguation)
- Windsor Lake (disambiguation)
- Windsor Park (disambiguation)
- Windsor Road (disambiguation)
- Windsor Township (disambiguation)
- Winsor (disambiguation)
