= Windsor Historic District =

Windsor Historic District, or Windsor Village Historic District or variations, may refer to:

- Windsor Square Historic District, Phoenix, AZ, listed on the NRHP in Arizona
- Windsor Village Historic Preservation Overlay Zone, Los Angeles, California
- East Windsor Hill Historic District, South Windsor, CT, listed on the NRHP in Connecticut
- Windsor Farms Historic District, South Windsor, CT, listed on the NRHP in Connecticut
- Windsor Road Historic District, Newton, MA, listed on the NRHP in Massachusetts
- Windsor Court Historic District, Southbridge, MA, listed on the NRHP in Massachusetts
- Windsor Hills Historic District, Baltimore, MD, listed on the NRHP in Maryland
- New Windsor Historic District, New Windsor, MD, listed on the NRHP in Maryland
- Windsor Historic District (Windsor, New Jersey), listed on the NRHP in New Jersey
- Windsor Village Historic District (Windsor, New York), listed on the NRHP in New York
- Windsor Historic District (Windsor, North Carolina), listed on the NRHP in North Carolina
- Windsor Village Historic District (Windsor, Vermont), listed on the NRHP in Vermont

== See also ==
- Windsor (disambiguation)
