= New Windsor =

New Windsor may refer to:

== United States ==
- New Windsor, Illinois
- New Windsor, Maryland
  - New Windsor College, two defunct colleges
  - New Windsor Historic District
- New Windsor, New York, a town
  - New Windsor (CDP), New York, a census-designated place in the town
  - New Windsor Cantonment State Historic Site
- New Windsor Township, South Carolina, an 18th-century township that included Savannah Town, South Carolina
- New Windsor Hotel, previously the 6th Avenue Hotel, a historic building in Phoenix, Arizona

== Elsewhere ==
- New Windsor, New Zealand, Auckland
- Windsor, Berkshire, England, previously officially designated New Windsor

== See also ==
- Old Windsor
- Windsor (disambiguation)
