= Windsor station =

Windsor station or Windsor railway station may refer to:

== Australia ==
- Windsor railway station, Brisbane
- Windsor railway station, Sydney
- Windsor railway station, Melbourne

== Canada ==
- Windsor Station (Montreal)
- Windsor station (Nova Scotia)
- Windsor station (Ontario)
- Windsor station (Michigan Central Railroad), also in Windsor, Ontario

== United Kingdom ==
- Windsor & Eton Riverside railway station
- Windsor & Eton Central railway station
- Windsor railway station (Northern Ireland), a disused station in Belfast

== United States ==
- Windsor station (California)
- Windsor station (Connecticut)
- Windsor Locks station, Connecticut
- Windsor station (Vermont)

== See also ==
- Windsor (disambiguation)
- Windsor & Eton railway station (disambiguation)
