= B Battery Royal Horse Artillery =

British Army artillery battery

- Active: 1 February 1793 – 28 March 1819; 9 May 1855 – present
- Country: United Kingdom
- Allegiance: United Kingdom
- Branch: British Army
- Type: Artillery
- Role: Self-propelled artillery
- Size: Battery
- Part of: 1st Regiment Royal Horse Artillery
- Garrison/HQ: Larkhill Camp
- Nickname: Super B
- Motto: Honi soit qui mal y pense (“shamed be whoever thinks ill of it"- or "Evil to him who evil thinks").
- Anniversaries: Sahagun Day 21 December
- Equipment: AS-90
- Engagements: Irish Rebellion of 1798; Peninsular War; Crimean War; Boxer Rebellion; First World War; Second World War; Aden Emergency; Operation Banner-(Northern Ireland); Operation Granby-(Iraq); Bosnia; Kosovo; Operation TELIC-(Iraq); Operation HERRICK-(Afghanistan); Operation CABRIT-(Estonia)
- Battle honours: Ubique

B Battery, Royal Horse Artillery is a Close Support Battery of 1st Regiment Royal Horse Artillery. It is currently based in Purvis Lines in Larkhill Camp.

== History ==
=== Formation ===
Following the French Revolution in 1789, an uneasy truce between England and France collapsed when, on 1 February 1793, Napoléon declared war on England. On the same day, by Royal Warrant of King George III, A Troop (now A Battery The Chestnut Troop) and B Troop (now B Battery) were raised at Woolwich. The Battery flag 'The Chequerboard' was created to distinguish the Battery from other batteries on the gun line. The date of when the flag was first used is unknown.

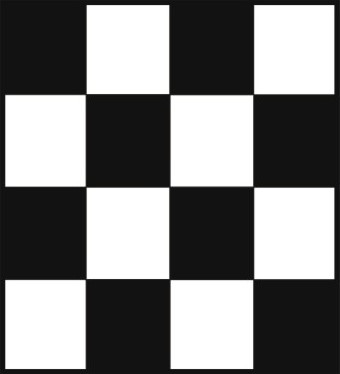
The 'Chequerboard' for B Battery Royal Horse Artillery.

=== Irish Rebellion of 1798 ===
The troops' first deployment came when it supplied two guns to a composite troop in response to the Irish Rebellion of 1798. The first battle came at the Battle of New Ross on 5 June 1798 which was later recognised as one of the hardest contests of the rebellion. The guns were later present at the final encounter of the rebellion at the Battle of Vinegar Hill.

=== Peninsular War ===
B Troop departed from Woolwich Wharf on 23 September 1808 and arrived in Corunna on 8 November. The Troop first saw action in Spain against Napoleon's armies when supporting 15th Hussars, at the Battle of Sahagun. The troop also later took part in the Battle of Corunna, where both of these battles are now the names of troops within the Battery.

=== England and Reduction, 1809 - 1819 ===
This period was one of inactivity for B Troop. The Troop had been severely tested in the Peninsular Campaign and saw no more active service from the Napoleonic Wars. In 1813, the first Rocket Troop was formed from a cadre of B Troop and on 28 February 1819, it was decided to reduce B Troop RHA as part of a reduction of size of the British Army following the Waterloo Campaign.

=== Crimean War ===
In the Crimean War during the Siege of Sevastopol (1854–1855), B Troop, Royal Horse Artillery was re-formed on 1 May 1855, and landed in the Crimea peninsular one month later. However, by this stage the war was well under way with the siege of Sebastopol already commenced. There is no record of B Troop being directly engaged.

=== The Boxer Rebellion, 1900 ===
In 1900 during the Boxer Rebellion, the Battery was the only Horse Artillery unit present. During the Battery's time in China, it did not encounter much resistance however, it was forced to travel hundreds of miles over almost impassable terrain. Unfortunately there is very little documented history from the Battery's activity during this period. Most of the Battery's most interesting and unusual pieces of silver originate from this campaign.

=== First World War ===
At the beginning of the war, B Battery was still in India however quickly returned to England in 1914. It became the senior Battery in the famous 29th Division and 1915 was perhaps the greatest in B Battery's history since the Peninsula Campaign. In April 1915, the Right Section of B Battery was the first Horse Artillery unit ashore during the Gallipoli landings. During the battle, the battery fired more ammunition from their 18-pounder guns than any other battery, and when the Allied forces pulled out, B Battery was the final Battery to leave the peninsula. In 1916, the Battery was almost continually in action during the Somme Offensive. In 1917, the Battery moved to support the Allied offensives at Arras, the Third Battle of Ypres and the Battle of Passchendaele.

=== Between the World Wars ===
Between 1919 and 1921, the Battery was sent to Egypt and Palestine. It then returned to England until 1932 when it redeployed again to Egypt and Palestine to perform police duties during the British Mandate of Palestine and the Arab-Jewish terrorist campaign which later led to the Great Revolt.

=== Mechanisation, 1936 ===
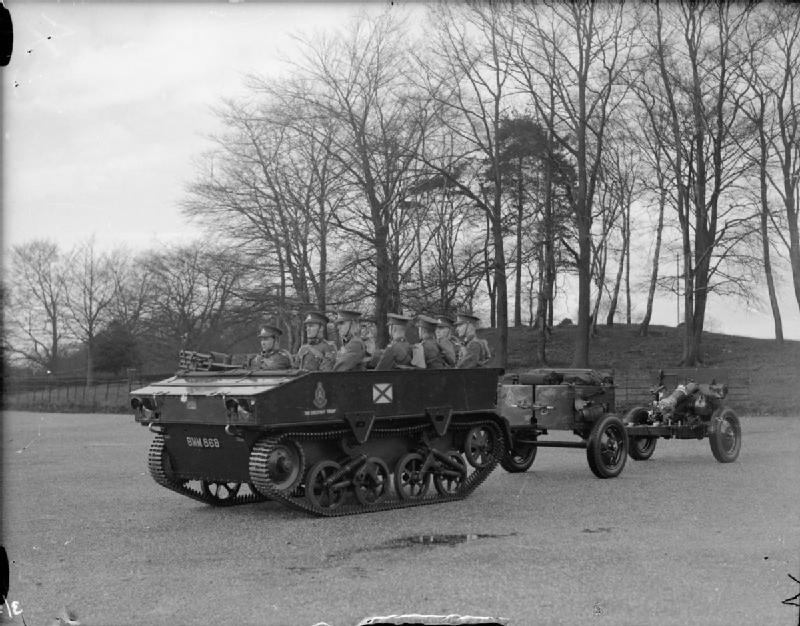
A 'Dragon' tractor towing the 3.7 inch howitzer from the A Battery (The Chestnut Troop).

The last time the Battery officially paraded with horses was for the funeral of its commander, Major McKay, in Cairo on 14 June 1937. In 1936, B Battery became mechanised and ‘Dragon’ tractors towing 3.7 inch howitzers replaced the 13-pounder guns and horses. At this time, B Battery formed part of 1st Brigade RHA and supported the 1st Cavalry Brigade station in Egypt whose task was to defend the country's railways. In 1938, B and O Batteries, and A and E Batteries, were merged to form two six gun Batteries forming the A/E Battery and B/O Battery. 1st Brigade RHA was shortly after renamed 1st Regiment RHA.

=== Second World War ===
In 1939, the battery moved to France, where they were equipped with the 25-pounder gun, towed by the Morris Quad. In June 1940, with the 51st (Highland) Infantry Division, it suffered severe losses at St Valery. After reforming in England in late 1940, B Battery departed for the Middle East, as part of the Desert Rats. It fought in all the major battles in the Middle East Theatre of Operations. Most significantly, during the Siege of Tobruk the Battery was in constant action. The Battery also fought notably at Derna, the First Battle of El Alamein, Alam el Halfa and the Second Battle of El Alamein. It was at Alam el Halfa that the battery supported 133 Infantry Brigade firing onto the 21. Panzer Division, knocking out or damaging some 30 German tanks. Sometime between 1942 and 1945 the battery was retrained on the 105 mm Priest and were involved in the Battles for the Gothic Line and River Po in Italy.

=== Egypt and Palestine, 1945-1951 ===
After the war, the tremendous immigration of European Jews to the new state of Israel resulted in the re-occurrence of the 1936 Arab-Jewish fighting by the Arab resistance. In 1947, B Battery, as part of the 1st Armoured Division, returned to Palestine to assist the civil police in attempting to keep the peace. 1949 found the Battery in the Suez Canal Zone whilst equipped with 25 pounder self-propelled Sextons. The Battery later returned to England in 1951.

=== British Army of the Rhine (BAOR), 1952-1982 ===
In 1952, B Battery moved to BAOR which was to become its base for 17 of the next 22 years. On arrival, the Battery was stationed in Munster and took on the NATO role of helping to maintain a balance of power in Europe. In 1955, the equipment changed from the Sexton to the American M44 155m self-propelled howitzers. B Battery was relocated from Munster to Hildesheim in 1958.

=== Aden and Radfan Campaign, 1965-1967 ===
In 1965, after a short period of training with the Italian 105 mm Pack Howitzers at Netheravon, B Battery moved once again to the Middle East and remained in Aden until May 1967.

=== Northern Ireland and BAOR, 1969-1977 ===
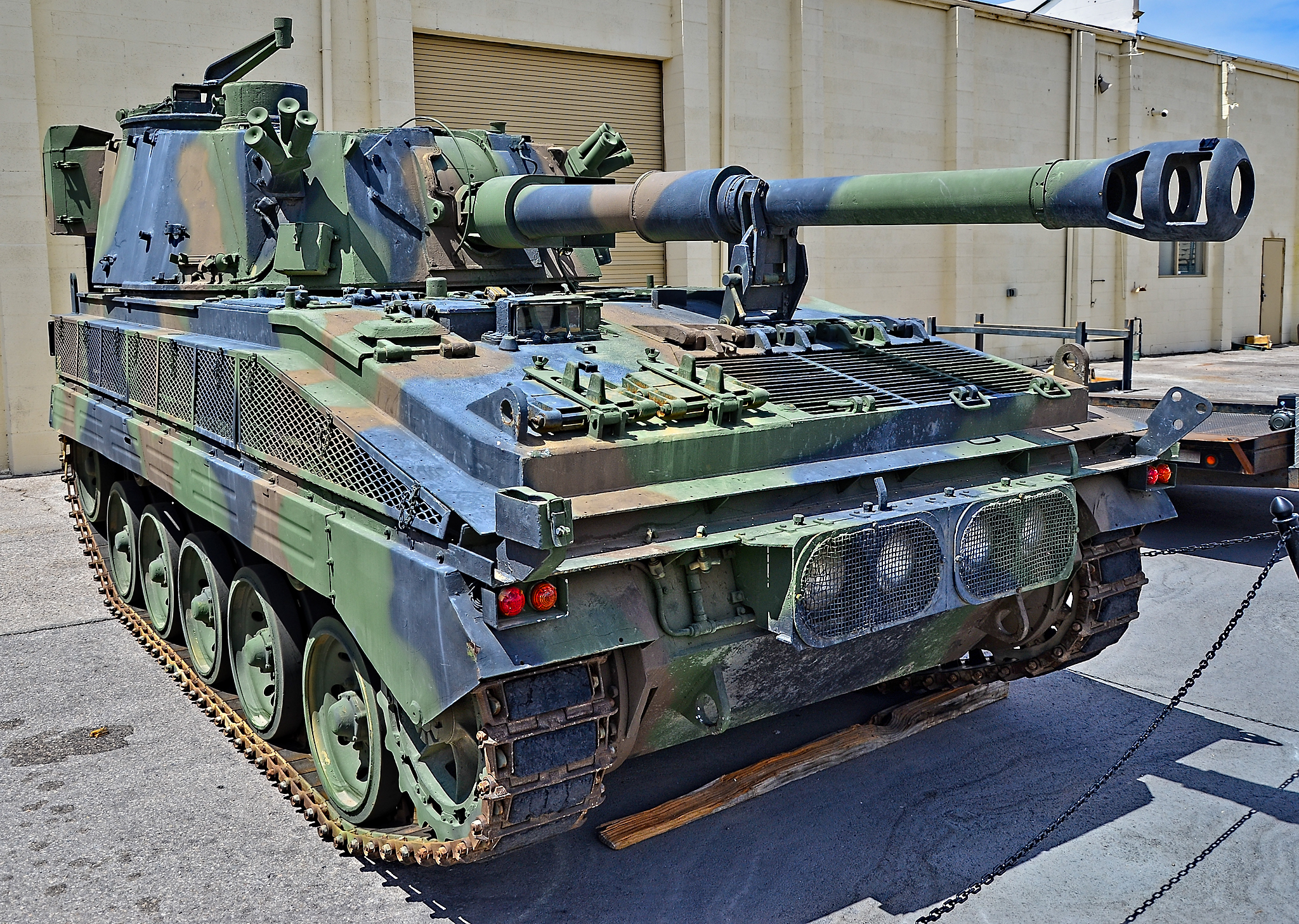
The 105mm FV433 Self Propelled 'Abbot' Gun

During this period there was an exciting series of roles for the Battery, ranging from urban international security tasks to ‘North-West Frontier’ style gunnery actions in the rugged Radfan Mountains during the Radfan Campaign. In 1967, B Battery moved to Colchester for three years with the Strategic Reserve. As well as exercising in the air portable role in many different countries, the Battery had a successful five-month tour in Belfast from October 1969 to March 1970. B Battery then returned to BAOR in 1970 where they were handed 105 mm self-propelled Abbots from 3rd Regiment RHA in Detmold and re-assumed the BAOR NATO role. Between September 1972 and 1977, B Battery completed three successful tours in various parts of Northern Ireland and was later moved to Topcliffe in North Yorkshire in February 1977. B Battery was equipped with the 5.5-inch gun as an interim measure before being equipped with the very latest 155 mm gun, the towed FH 70 howitzer in 1979.

=== 105mm self-propelled Abbot, 1970-1977 and 1982-1992 ===
B Battery became the Trials Battery after adopting the FH 70 howitzer and completed these trials in June 1979. Up until 1982, members of the Battery served in many parts of the world; on Exercise CRUSADER, in the Rhodesian Cease Fire Monitoring Force, in Hong Kong teaching gunnery to Ghurkas, on HMS Coventry, in Canada, in Kenya with the Green Howards, in Durham on MAC(P) duties covering the fireman's strike of November 1977 and in Belize, where two members of the Battery received Commander British Forces Commendations for their actions on the eve of the country's independence.

=== BAOR, Canada and Op GRANBY, 1982-1992 ===
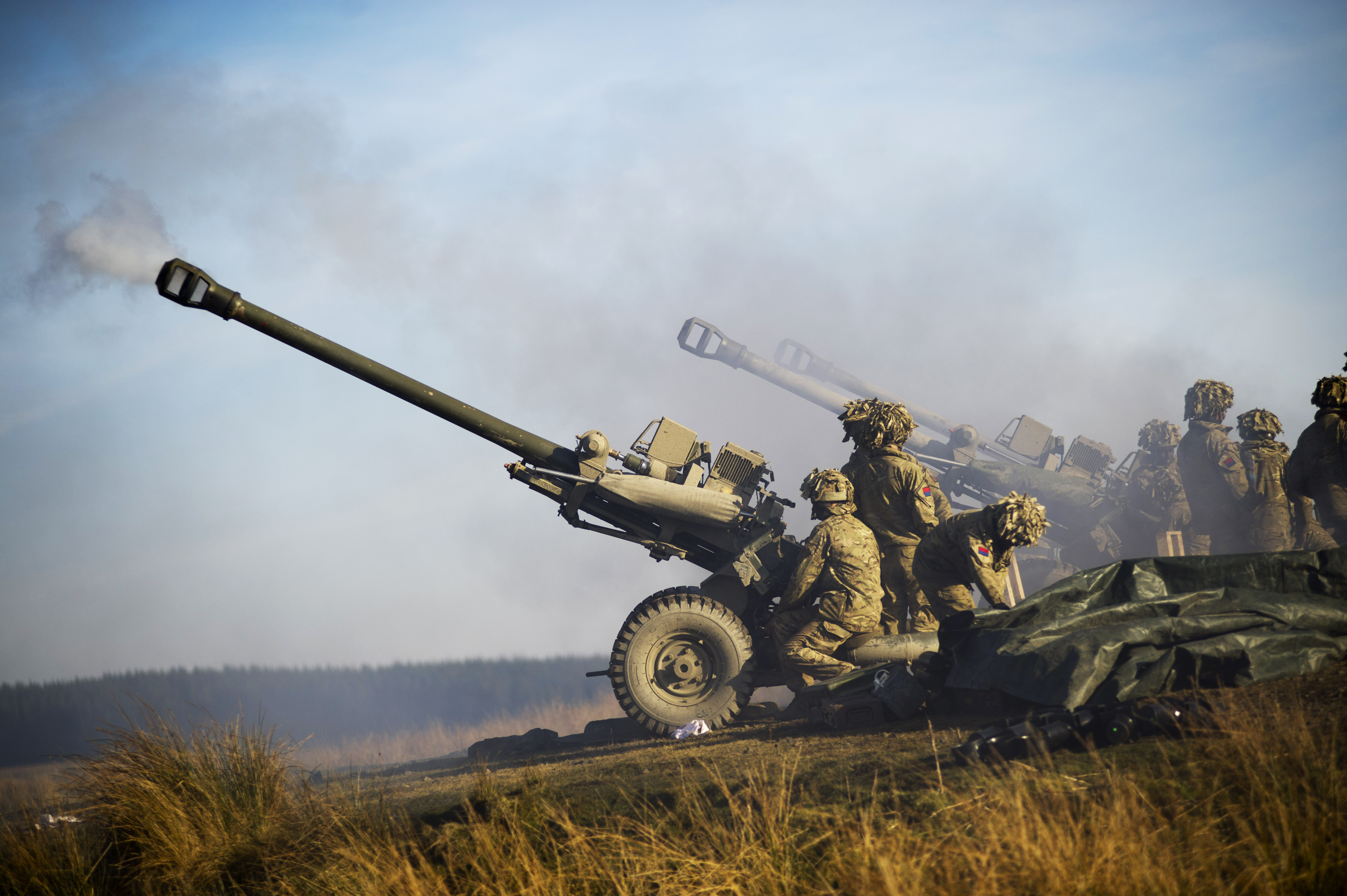
The 105 mm Light Gun

1982 saw B Battery return to BAOR and were stationed in Hohne Garrison with 22nd Armoured Brigade. The Battery supported the 9th/12th Lancers for the first few months and then 1st Battalion Coldstream Guards. The period between 1982 and 1991 was spent on various exercises with some elements of the Battery deploying to Canada at least once a year. The 1st Battalion Welsh Guards replaced the Coldstream Guards in 1983 and in turn was replaced by The Scots Guards in 1988. In 1991, over half the Regiment deployed to the Gulf on Op GRANBY. B Battery went into suspended animation during the Gulf War and A/B/E Battery was formed. In September 1992, as part of 1st Regiment RHA’s arms plot move to the UK, B Battery moved into Assaye Barracks, Tidworth. Here the Battery were equipped with the L118 Light Gun, as an interim measure until the introduction of the AS90 155 mm self-propelled howitzer.

=== Falkland Islands and receipt of the AS90, 1992 ===
In February 1993, Sahagun Troop deployed on Exercise SEA TROUT in the Falkland Islands. This was an exercise that occurred every two years and was designed to bring the Light Guns, which were stationed on the islands, out of light care and to be proof fired. This enabled the Troop to exercise in unfamiliar surroundings in extremely harsh weather conditions. In August 1993, along with the remainder of 1RHA, B Battery attended the RHA 200 parade at Woolwich, London and was observed by the Captain General, Queen Elizabeth II. Later, in the same month, the Battery took receipt of its first AS90s and a period of converting to this latest piece of Artillery culminated in a regimental exercise on Salisbury plain towards the end of the year. In 1994, the Battery attended the In-Service Reliability Demonstration (ISRD). This trial saw the AS90 brought into general service however soon after the ISRD, the Battery converted to the Light Gun and deployed on Exercise POND JUMP WEST in Wainwright, Canada in support of the 1st Royal Welsh Fusiliers (1RWF) Battle Group. On its return to the U.K., the Regiment was warned off for Operations in Northern Ireland. Despite four intensive months of Internal Security Training, the Regiment was stood down due to the ceasefire.

=== Balkans, 1996-2001 ===
In 1996, the Battery deployed on Op RESOLUTE to Bosnia as part of the NATO lead IFOR. Initially, B Battery were to be based in Baraci but due to reductions in theatre, it was decided that three gun batteries were not required at that location. The Battery was teamed up with L (Nery) Battery to form B/L Battery and was based in Glamoc. From here, the Battery conducted deployments with its Troop of guns through Multi National Division South West. After a successful tour, B Battery returned to the UK in January 1997. Following a period of leave, B Battery then started pre-BATUS training, again joining forces with L Battery to support 1st RWF Battle Group. Just prior to deploying, the Battery took the lead in supplying manpower to the Royal Tournament at Earls Court, London, the largest military tattoo in the world at the time. This had members of the Battery assisting in a variety of jobs from taking part in the show to the necessary backroom work. 1988 saw B Battery deploy again to Glamoc, Bosnia, this time as part of SFOR. When the Battery returned in January, 1999, little did they realise that by June the same year the TAC Group would find itself spearheading the advance of the NATO force into Kosovo. The TAC Group saw at first hand the destruction that the Serbs had tried to inflict on the local population during the conflict. The TAC Group returned to Tidworth in September. In 2000, the Battery deployed on Exercise GRAND PRIX in Kenya to support the Argyll and Sutherland Highlanders. Here, the Battery was equipped with the 105mm Light Gun. The Battery had an extremely good exercise and conducted some great infantry training as well as firing the guns. On return from Kenya, the Battery made it to the final of the RA Inter-Battery football against 132 Bty and won 6–0. Once again, the Balkans reared its head and this time Sahagun Troop deployed with L/N Bty to Kosovo and Downman's Troop to Sanski Most with Chestnut Troop. 2001 saw B Battery training up to support the King's Royal Hussars on Exercise IRON ANVIL in BATUS as part of 19 Regiment RA in support of 12th Mechanised Brigade. On return to the UK, the Battery commenced a build-up to deploy back to the Balkans as the UK Artillery Battery based in Sipovo. B Battery was the last Gunner unit, in role, in the Balkans. Back in the UK, the Battery immediately re-rolled to provide cover for the National Fireman's strike. The Regiment deployed to Cheshire and the Battery initially covered Warrington, Runcorn and Widnes. This commitment lasted intermittently between October 2002 and March 2003. The Battery also conducted a Brigade level exercise in BATUS with the Regiment before being warned off for Operation TELIC 4.

=== Operation TELIC 4, 2004-2007 ===
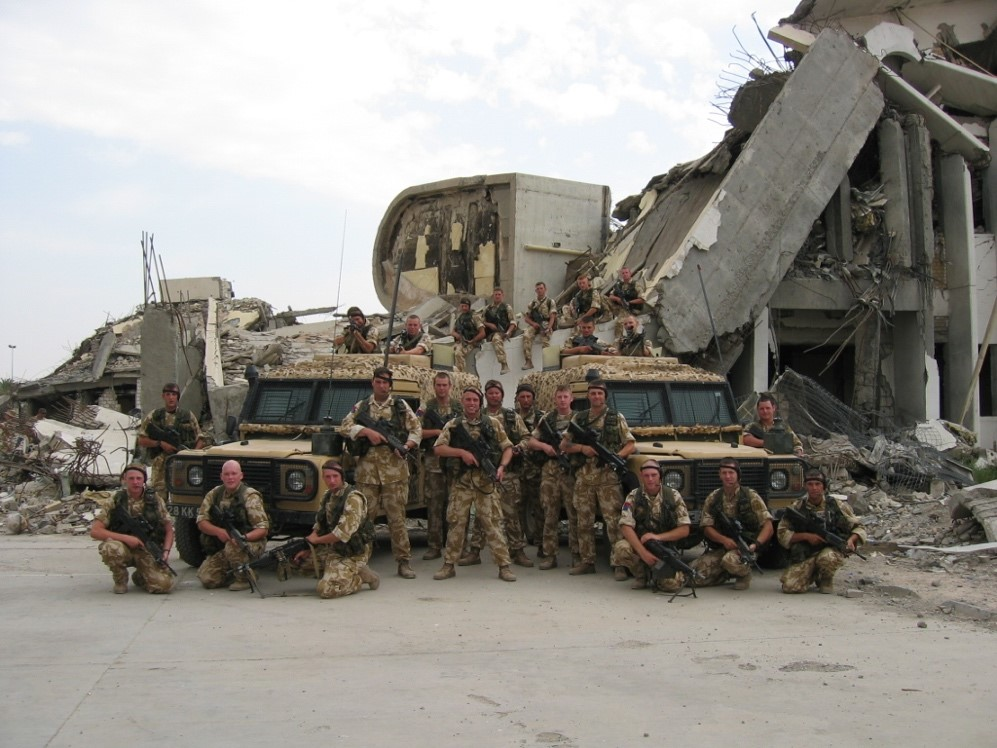
Downman's Troop with Snatch Land Rovers Operation TELIC 4, Iraq 2004

B Battery deployed to Iraq in April 2004 and was tasked with Security Sector Reform (SSR). The Battery was initially based at one of Saddam Hussein’s former Palaces in the south of Basra with Sahagun Troop tasked with mentoring the Tactical Support Unit (TSU) and being based at the Old State Building (OSB) in the centre of the city. B Battery moved location several times during the tour but spent the last two months back at the Palace providing escorts for the Provincial Support Liaison Team (PSLT). This team was part of the G5 support to assist the locals with the rebuilding of Iraq. On 28 September, whilst escorting one of these teams to a housing project in the north of Basra, the patrol was ambushed with small arms and rocket propelled grenades (RPG). The lead Snatch Land Rover was hit by a RPG which killed the driver Gunner David Lawrence and fatally wounded the commander, Corporal Marc Taylor, one of the Royal Electrical and Mechanical Engineers who was serving with the Battery as a team commander. The Battery finished the tour in late October and returned to the UK. After a period of leave, B Battery then prepared itself to deploy to Kenya to support the Royal Ghurkha Rifles (RGR), on Ex GRAND PRIX in the summer of 2005. After converting to the Light Gun, the Battery had a successful exercise. Digitisation followed in 2006 with the Regiment converting from the CLANSMAN radio system to the BOWMAN system. This required extensive re-training however proved successful following a regimental exercise. B Battery deployed to BATUS supporting 2 Royal Welsh in August 2005 and whilst there was warned off for Op TELIC 10 in 2007. On return from the exercise in Canada, the Battery put the guns into the Whole Fleet Management (WFM) programme and was selected to represent the Gunners for the Royal Regiment of Artillery Memorial Service at Hyde Park Corner.

=== Operation TELIC 10 and Operation HERRICK 11 ===
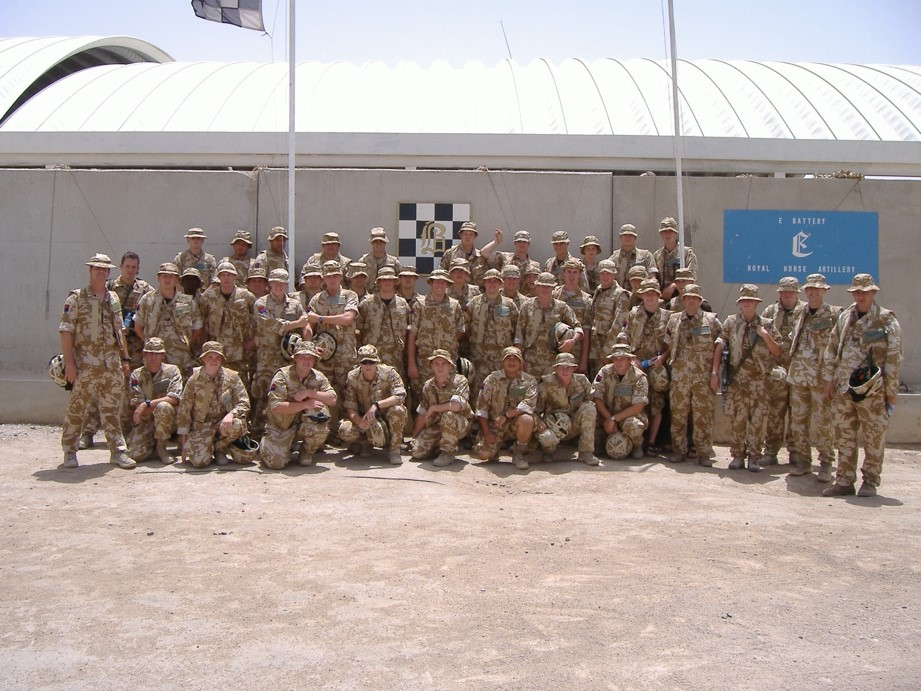
Majority of B Battery RHA Operation TELIC 10, 2007

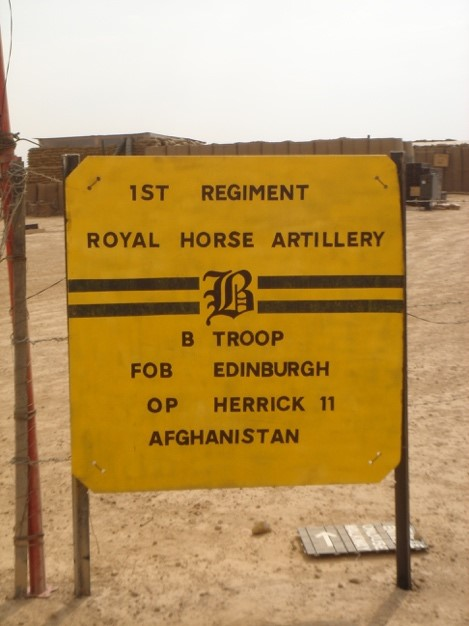
B Battery RHA FOB EDINBURGH Operation HERRICK 11, Afghanistan 2010

In 2007, the Battery moved into the Op TELIC 10 ORBAT and began the necessary training ready for operations in Iraq. The Battery deployed in May 2007 and was based at the Basra Air Station also known as the Contingency Operations Base (COB). Its task was to operate as an infantry company with responsibility for the Town of Az Zubayr. The Battery returned in late November after a highly successful tour. In 2008, B Battery converted to light gun and conducted numerous exercises gearing up for Op HERRICK 11 and successfully deployed to Afghanistan in October 2009. Whilst on the operation, the gun troops were separated with three guns based in FOB (Forward Operating Base) EDINBURGH and the other three were under the command of a Royal Australian Artillery troop (Brumby troop).

=== Operation HERRICK 18 ===
In 2010, B Battery converted back to AS90 with numerous confirmatory exercises including a Canada exercise supporting 1ST Battalion The Yorkshire Regiment. In 2012, the Battery deployed on Ex ASKARI THUNDER in Kenya as part of pre-deployment training for Op HERRICK 18. In 2013, B Battery deployed on a summer tour of Afghanistan. The gun group were all based in FOB OUELLETTE supporting 2 Scots and the higher echelon were all stationed in Camp Bastion. It was a successful tour resulting in the closing down of numerous FOBs and the handing back of security control to the Afghan forces. In 2014, B Battery re–rolled back to AS90 and in 2015 the Battery conducted Ex PRAIRIE STORM 3 in Canada in support of 1 Mercian. In 2016, for the first time, the Battery was tasked to carry out ceremonial duties in London at the Tower of London, Windsor Castle, Buckingham Palace and St James’ Palace.

=== Op CABRIT 6, March - September 2020 ===
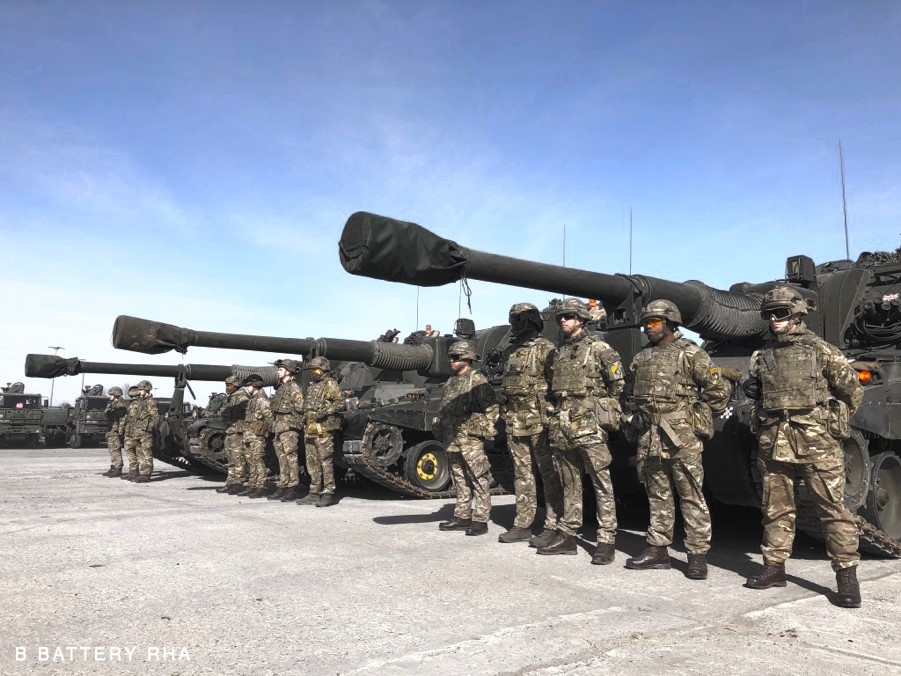
Detachments Front B Battery RHA Operation CABRIT 6, Tapa Camp Estonia 2020

B Battery deployed on Operation CABRIT 6 to Estonia as part of the NATO enhanced Forward Presence within the 1st Royal Regiment of Fusiliers (1RRF) Battle Group in March 2020. The Battery assumed the role from E Battery who completed Op CABRIT 5. The Battery later handed over to The Chestnut Troop in September 2020. Along with three companies from 1RRF, the Battlegroup was composed of C Squadron Queen's Royal Hussars and Armadillo Company from the Danish Royal Life Guards who were later replaced by Vidar Company from the Danish Guard Hussars Regiment in July 2020. The Battle Group's task was to deter adversaries, defend Estonia if need be and to reassure the Estonian population. The tour occurred during the COVID-19 pandemic which placed great restrictions on movements, exercises and resulted in the cancellation of Rest and Recuperation. The major annual exercise for the regular and reservist components of the Estonian Army, Ex SPRING STORM, was drastically scaled down to minimise the spread of coronavirus - this theme continued throughout the tour. B Battery conducted live firing in Estonia and Adazi, Latvia during June. The relatively quiet deployment was certainly unique as the soldiers were understandably very concerned for their families back in the U.K. during the COVID-19 crisis.

== Current role ==
=== Structure and equipment ===
B Battery has four troops named after famous battles:

- El Tamar Troop is the Targeting Troop and it is equipped with three Warrior OPVs, a Warrior BCV and a 432 FPC.
- Corunna Troop is the Logistics Troop containing the BQMS and Motor Transport departments which are responsible for all the wheeled vehicles both in and out of camp and for all re-supply in the field.
- Downman's Troop is equipped with three AS-90s, a Command Post FV 432 and a Gun Line Section Commander's FV 432.
- Sahagun Troop is also equipped with three AS-90s, a Command Post FV 432 and a Gun Line Section Commander's FV 432.

== See also ==
- British Army
- Royal Artillery
- Royal Horse Artillery
- List of Royal Artillery Batteries

== Bibliography ==
- Clarke, W.G. (1993). Horse Gunners: The Royal Horse Artillery, 200 Years of Panache and Professionalism. Woolwich: The Royal Artillery Institution. ISBN 09520762-0-9.
