= Windsor Hotel =

Windsor Hotel may refer to:

in Asia

- Windsor Hotel Taichung, Taichung, Taiwan
- The Windsor Hotel Toya Resort & Spa, Hokkaidō, Japan
- The Hotel Windsor, Myoko, Japan

in Australia

- Hotel Windsor, Melbourne, Australia
- Windsor Hotel (Perth), Western Australia

in Canada

- Windsor Hotel (Montreal), Canada
- Windsor Arms Hotel, Toronto, Canada
- An informal name for Caesars Windsor
- Windsor Hotel, Sault Ste. Marie, Ontario

in Egypt

- Windsor Hotel (Cairo), Egypt

in the United States

- Windsor Hotel (Phoenix, Arizona), listed in the National Register of Historic Places.
- Windsor Hotel (San Diego), part of the Gaslamp Quarter Historic District
- Windsor Hotel (Americus, Georgia)
- Windsor Hotel (Garden City, Kansas), listed on the NRHP in Finney County, Kansas
- Windsor Hotel (Manhattan), New York City
- Windsor Hotel (Memphis, Tennessee), original name of the Lorraine Motel where Martin Luther King was assassinated, now the National Civil Rights Museum

== See also ==
- Windsor Atlantica Hotel, Rio de Janeiro, Brazil
- Windsor Court Hotel, New Orleans, USA
- Windsor Plaza Hotel Saigon, Ho Chi Minh City, Vietnam
