= Winsor Township =

Winsor Township may refer to the following places:

- Winsor Township, Huron County, Michigan
- Winsor Township, Clearwater County, Minnesota
- Winsor Township, Brookings County, South Dakota

== See also ==
- Windsor Township (disambiguation)
- Winsor (disambiguation)
