= Windsor Township, Ohio =

Windsor Township, Ohio may refer to:

- Windsor Township, Ashtabula County, Ohio
- Windsor Township, Lawrence County, Ohio
- Windsor Township, Morgan County, Ohio

== See also ==
- Windsor Township (disambiguation)
