= Windsor Hills =

Windsor Hills or Windsor Hill or variant may refer to:

== United Kingdom ==
- Windsor Hill, a biological Site of Special Scientific Interest in Buckinghamshire
- Windsor Hill Marsh, a biological Site of Special Scientific Interest in Somerset
- Windsor Hill Quarry, a geological Site of Special Scientific Interest in Somerset

== United States ==
- Windsor Hills, a subdivision of the View Park-Windsor Hills, California, census-designated place
- Windsor Hills, a neighborhood of Forest Park, Baltimore
- Windsor Hills Historic District, Baltimore, Maryland
- Windsor Hills, Austin, Texas
- Windsor Hills, Delaware
- Windsor Hills, a camp in Windsor, New Hampshire
- Windsor Hills, a vacation resort community in Kissimmee, Florida

== See also ==
- Windsor (disambiguation)
- East Windsor Hill Historic District
- Windsor Hill Primary School
- Windsor Mountain School
