= Jedediah Hotchkiss =

American Confederate Army officer, cartographer, and topographer (1828–1899)

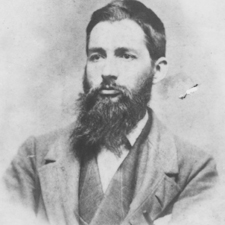
Hotchkiss, c. 1866

Jedediah Hotchkiss (November 30, 1828 – January 17, 1899) was an American Confederate Army officer, cartographer, topographer and teacher. His detailed and accurate maps of the Shenandoah Valley are credited by many as a principal factor in Confederate General Stonewall Jackson's victories in the Valley Campaign of 1862 during the American Civil War.

== Early life ==
Jedediah Hotchkiss, who was better known as Jed, was born in Windsor, New York. He graduated from the Windsor Academy and, by the age of 18, he was teaching school himself in Lykens Valley, Pennsylvania. The following year he relocated to the Shenandoah Valley and opened the Mossy Creek Academy in Augusta County. He supplemented his income as a schoolteacher by working as a mining geologist. As he explored the beautiful area around his new home he began his hobby (and minor business) of mapmaking that would dominate the rest of his life. In 1853 he married a woman from Pennsylvania named Sara Ann Comfort and together they had two daughters. In 1855 Hotchkiss and his brother Nelson founded the Loch Willow Academy school for boys in Churchville, Virginia. His birthplace, known as the Jedediah Hotchkiss House, was listed on the National Register of Historic Places in 1982.

== Civil War ==
Near the end of June 1861, Hotchkiss signed on as a Confederate teamster to take supplies to the Churchville Cavalry at Rich Mountain, West Virginia. Hotchkiss offered his services as a mapmaker to Brig. Gen. Richard B. Garnett, whose Confederate brigade was operating in western Virginia. Hotchkiss was at the Battle of Rich Mountain and created maps for General Robert E. Lee's planned campaign in the mountains. He took a brief medical leave after being stricken with typhoid fever but returned to duty in March 1862 as chief topographical engineer of the Valley District, reporting to Maj. Gen. Stonewall Jackson. Following initial defeat at the First Battle of Kernstown during his 1862 Valley Campaign, on March 26, 1862, Jackson summoned Hotchkiss to his headquarters at Narrow Passage near Woodstock and directed him to "make me a map of the Valley, from Harper's Ferry to Lexington, showing all the points of offence and defence [sic] in those places." Hotchkiss' immediate recommendation was that Jackson's line on Stony Creek at Woodstock was indefensible and that Jackson should withdraw to Rude's Hill, a defensible small promontory south of Mt. Jackson. It was at Rude's Hill that Jackson reorganized his command for the rest of his successful 1862 campaign on the Shenandoah Valley.

The Shenandoah Valley had never been mapped in detail before. Running 150 miles in length and 25 miles wide, it was a daunting task, but Hotchkiss accepted the assignment and worked on the map for the remainder of the war. In order to accommodate his large scale of 1:80,000, he glued together three portions of tracing linen to form a large single map of 7 feet by 3 feet.

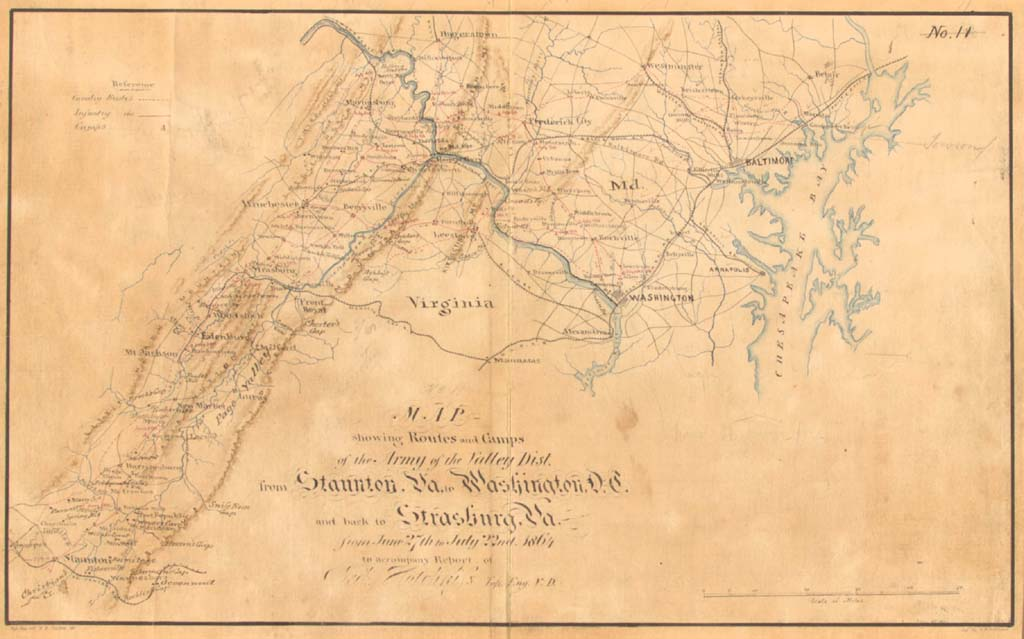
One of Hotchkiss's maps: Valley Campaign of 1864 for Jubal Early

Captain Hotchkiss served under Jackson for the rest of the general's life. Producing large volumes of accurate, detailed and even beautiful maps, he also aided the general by personally directing troop movements across the terrain with which he had become so familiar. Jackson's reputation for lightning movements and surprise attacks, befuddling his enemies, owes much to Hotchkiss's cartography. Together, they served in the Valley Campaign, the Northern Virginia Campaign (including the Battle of Cedar Mountain, the Second Battle of Bull Run and the Battle of Chantilly), the Maryland Campaign (including Harpers Ferry and Antietam), and the Battle of Fredericksburg. At the Battle of Chancellorsville in May 1863, Jackson asked Hotchkiss for eight maps of the area west of Fredericksburg and, along with local residents, discovered the route that Jackson's corps took in the famous flanking march against the Union Army. That night, Jackson was mortally wounded and died less than two weeks later.

After Jackson's death, Hotchkiss continued to be assigned to the staff of the corps commanders who succeeded him (Generals Richard S. Ewell and Jubal A. Early), but he was frequently called upon to work directly for General Robert E. Lee at the headquarters of the Army of Northern Virginia. Balancing these dual responsibilities, he served through the Gettysburg campaign, the Mine Run Campaign and the Overland Campaign. In June 1864, he accompanied Early on his raid through the Shenandoah Valley toward Washington, D.C., and one of his maps contributed to Early's successful surprise attack against General Philip Sheridan at the Battle of Cedar Creek (although the map was not able to prevent Early's decisive defeat by the end of the battle). He then returned to the Siege of Petersburg with the remnants of Early's defeated army for the remainder of the war.

After General Lee's surrender at Appomattox Court House in April 1865, Hotchkiss surrendered to the Union Army. General Ulysses S. Grant had Hotchkiss released from custody and returned his maps to him. Grant paid Hotchkiss for permission to use some of his maps in his reports and almost all of the Confederate maps in the Official Records produced by the U.S. War Department were those drawn by him.

== Postbellum career ==
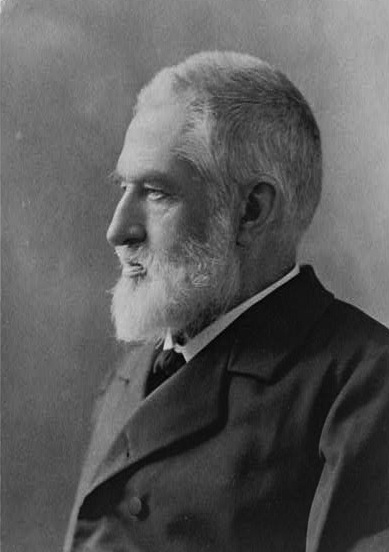
Jedediah Hotchkiss, c. 1890

As a civilian again, Hotchkiss returned to Staunton, Virginia, reopened his school, and was involved in economic activities designed to promote the recovery of the war-ravaged Shenandoah Valley and in veterans' affairs. After teaching school, he opened an office as a civil and mining consulting engineer and, being so familiar with the geography of the state, was able to steer lucrative foreign and Northern investments to the most appropriate places.

In October 1865, a Federal detective confronted Hotchkiss with a military order to confiscate his map collection. Hotchkiss refused to obey the order, and instead took some maps to Richmond for examination by army engineers. Despite Federal pressure, he was able to retain ownership of all his maps, while preparing maps of Virginia counties for the United States Army.

Hotchkiss collaborated in the writing of the 12-volume Confederate Military History, writing the 1,295-page Virginia volume himself. His journals were edited in 1973 by Archie P. MacDonald and published under the title Make Me a Map of the Valley: The Civil War Journal of Stonewall Jackson's Cartographer. Hotchkiss's sketchbooks, diaries and maps are available at the Library of Congress in Washington, D.C..

He was elected as a member to the American Philosophical Society in 1881.

== Death and property ==
Hotchkiss died at his home in Staunton at age 71. He is buried there in Thornrose Cemetery. The small town of Hotchkiss, West Virginia, in Raleigh County was named for him. The magnificent Queen Anne- and Eastlake-style mansion that Hotchkiss built in 1888 at 437 East Beverley Street in Staunton still stands. It is listed on the National Register of Historic Places and Virginia Landmark Register as The Oaks. It is in private ownership after a sale in February 2019 by the family that purchased it from the Hotchkiss heirs in 1948.

== The Hotchkiss map collection ==
The Hotchkiss collection contains over 600 maps primarily relating to the Virginias between 1861 and 1865. Some of the maps are from his post-war work, some are of individual estates and some are source maps made by others. The map collection was retained by his family following his death and the refusal of the Federal confiscation order. C. Vernon Eddy, librarian of the Handley Regional Library in Winchester, Virginia, made arrangements for the listing and safe-keeping of the maps in specially made aluminum tubes, before they were finally given to the Library of Congress in 1948, which then published the maps in 1951. Three of the original maps were donated by the Hotchkiss family to the Handley Library: a Route Map of Gettysburg Campaign, a Sketch of the Battle of Winchester [First] and a Sketch of the Second Battle of Winchester. The Jedediah Hotchkiss Papers are available in the Stewart Bell Jr. Archives Room through the Winchester-Frederick County Historical Society at Handley Regional Library in Winchester, Virginia.
