= Windsor Castle (ship) =

Several vessels have been named Windsor Castle for Windsor Castle:

- Windsor Castle (1783 ship) was launched at Whitby. From 1797 she made five voyages as a slave ship and foundered off Bermuda in 1803 after having disembarked her slaves.
- Windsor Castle (1804 packet ship), a packet boat that on 1 October 1807, captured a French privateer after a sanguinary engagement. An American privateer captured Windsor Castle on 15 March 1815.
- Windsor Castle was the ship HMS Porcupine, launched in 1807, that the Royal Navy sold in 1816. She became the mercantile Windsor Castle and was condemned at Mauritius in June 1826.
- Windsor Castle (1836 ship) was built by James Edwards at South Shields.
- Windsor Castle (1857 ship) was a passenger/cargo ship built by William Pile in Sunderland, that was wrecked in 1884.
- RMS Windsor Castle (1921), a Union-Castle passenger ship launched in 1921
- RMS Windsor Castle (1959), a Union-Castle passenger ship launched in 1959.

== See also ==
- HMS Windsor Castle – one of six vessels of the Royal Navy by that name

Citations
