= Windsor Castle (disambiguation) =

Windsor Castle is a castle in Windsor, one of the seats of the British Royal Family.

Windsor Castle or Windsor Palace may also refer to:

== Buildings ==
- Windsor Castle, Kensington, a public house in London
- Windsor Castle, Maida Vale, a public house in London
- Windsor Palace (Thailand), a former palace in Bangkok, Thailand

== Places ==
- Windsor Castle, Pennsylvania, an unincorporated community in Pennsylvania, USA
- Windsor Castle (Smithfield, Virginia), listed on the National Register of Historic Places in Isle of Wight County, Virginia
- Windsor Castle (Toano, Virginia), listed on the National Register of Historic Places listings in James City County, Virginia

== Vehicles ==
- HMS Windsor Castle – one of six ships of the Royal Navy
- Windsor Castle (ship) – one of several merchant or passenger ships of that name
- Windsor Castle, one of the GWR 3031 Class locomotives that were built for and run on the Great Western Railway between 1891 and 1915

== Other uses ==
- Windsor Castle (novel), a novel by William Harrison Ainsworth serially published in 1842
- Castle Windsor, part of the Castle Project (an open source application framework)

== See also ==
- Windsor (disambiguation)
