= Winsor =

Winsor may refer to:

== Places ==
- Winsor, Hampshire, England
- Winsor, Newfoundland and Labrador, Canada
- United States:
  - Winsor Township, Huron County, Michigan
  - Winsor Township, Clearwater County, Minnesota
  - Winsor Township, Brookings County, South Dakota

== People ==
- Winsor (surname)
- Winsor French (1904–1973), American society columnist
- Winsor Harmon (born 1963), American actor
- Winsor McCay (1869–1934), American cartoonist and animator

== Other uses ==
- Winsor Building, located in Asbury Park, Monmouth County, New Jersey, United States. The building was built in 1904 and was added to the National Register of Historic Places on September 13, 1979
- Winsor Dam, and the Goodnough Dike impound the waters of the Swift River and the Ware River Diversion forming the Quabbin Reservoir, the largest water body in Massachusetts
- Winsor McCay Award, given to individuals in recognition of lifetime or career contributions in animation
- Winsor & Newton, a company based in London, UK that manufactures a wide variety of fine art products, including: oils, alkyds, watercolours, acrylics, pastels, artists' brushes, canvases, papers, portfolios, and distributes the Derwent pencil sets
- Winsorising, as in a Winsorized mean
- Winsor School in Boston, Massachusetts
- House of Windsor, the royal house of the United Kingdom and the other Commonwealth realms

== See also ==
- Windsor (disambiguation)
