= Jedediah Hotchkiss House =

Historic house in New York, United States

- U.S. National Register of Historic Places
- Location within New York Location within the United States
- Location: 10 Chestnut St., Windsor, New York
- Coordinates: 42°4′15″N 75°37′58″W
- Area: 1.7 acres (0.69 ha)
- Built: ca. 1823
- Architectural style: Federal
- NRHP reference No.: 82003348
- Added to NRHP: June 03, 1982

Jedediah Hotchkiss House, also known as Old Stone House, is a historic home located at Windsor in Broome County, New York, United States. It was built about 1823 and is a two-story dwelling with a gable roof constructed of roughly squared creek and fieldstone. It was the birthplace of educator and American Civil War cartographer and topographer Jedediah Hotchkiss (1828–1899).

It was listed on the National Register of Historic Places in 1982.
