= Windsor Lake (disambiguation) =

Windsor Lake or Lake Windsor or variant, may refer to:

== Lakes ==
- Lake Windsor, Arkansas, USA; a lake
- Lake Windsor, Wisconsin, USA; a lake, see List of lakes of Wisconsin
- Lake Windsor, Great Inagua, Inagua, Bahamas; a lake

== Other uses ==
- Windsor Lake, Newfoundland and Labrador, Canada; a provincial electoral district
- Lake Windsor, Wisconsin, USA; a community

== See also ==
- Windsor (disambiguation)
- Lake (disambiguation)
