= Windsor Theatre (disambiguation) =

Windsor Theatre is the former name (1937–1943) of the 48th Street Theatre in New York City.

Windsor Theatre may also refer to:

- Windsor Theatre (Bowery, New York), New York City, 1878–1910
- Windsor Theatre, Brighton, a cinema in Adelaide, South Australia
- Windsor Theatre, Hilton, an historic cinema in Adelaide, South Australia
- Windsor Theatre, Hindmarsh, an historic cinema in Adelaide, South Australia
- Windsor Theatre, Lockleys, an historic cinema in Adelaide, South Australia
- Windsor Theatre, St Morris, an historic cinema in Adelaide, South Australia

== See also ==
- Theatre Royal, Windsor, a theatre in Windsor, UK
