= Windsor & Eton railway station =

Windsor & Eton railway station may refer to:

- Windsor & Eton Central railway station
- Windsor & Eton Riverside railway station
