= Windsor Hotel (San Diego) =

Historic building in San Diego, California, U.S.

Coordinates: 32.7142°N 117.1608°W

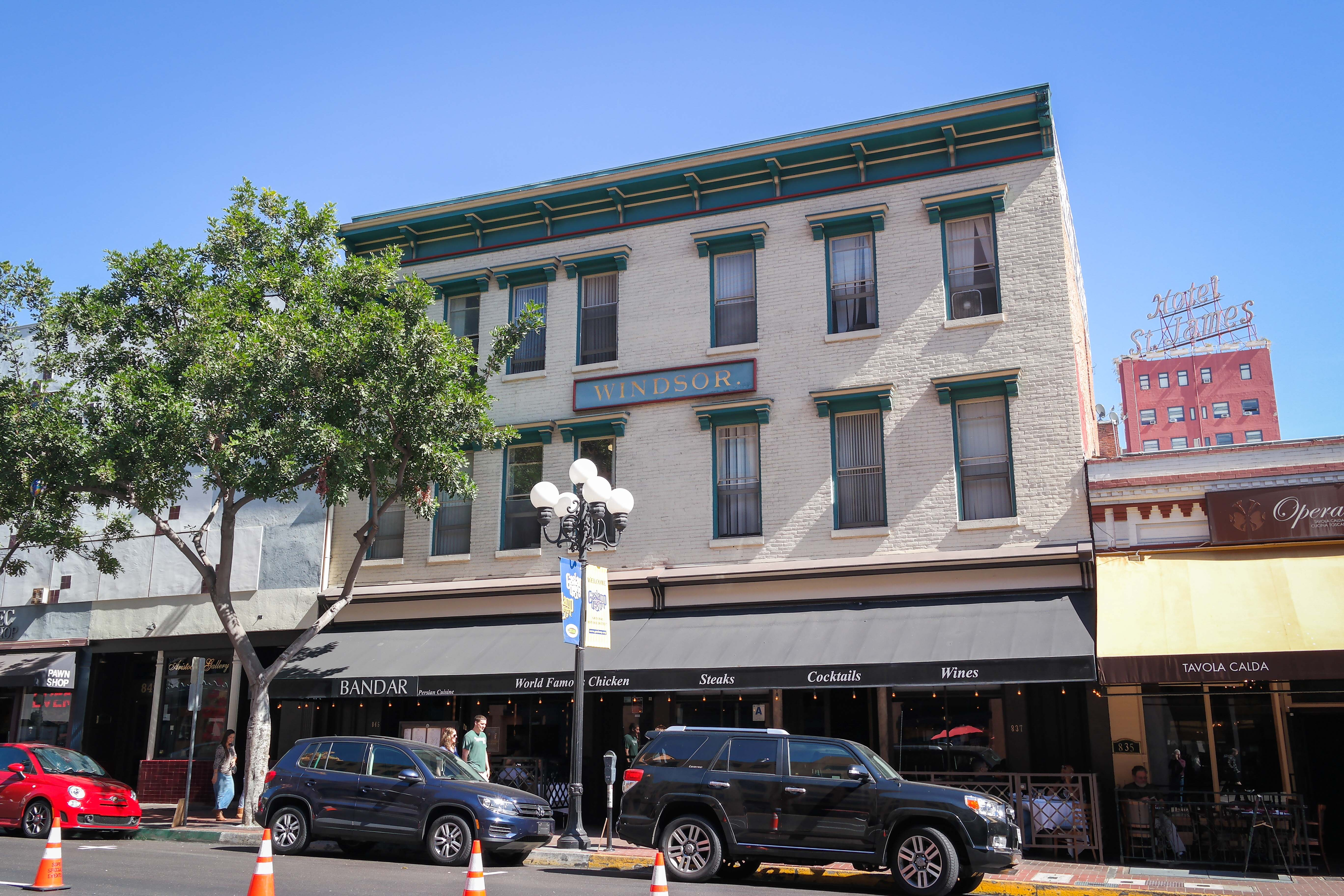
- Interactive map of the Windsor Hotel area

General information
- Location: San Diego, California, U.S.
- Opened: 1887

The Windsor Hotel is an historic structure located at 843 4th Avenue in San Diego's Gaslamp Quarter, in the U.S. state of California. It was built in 1887.

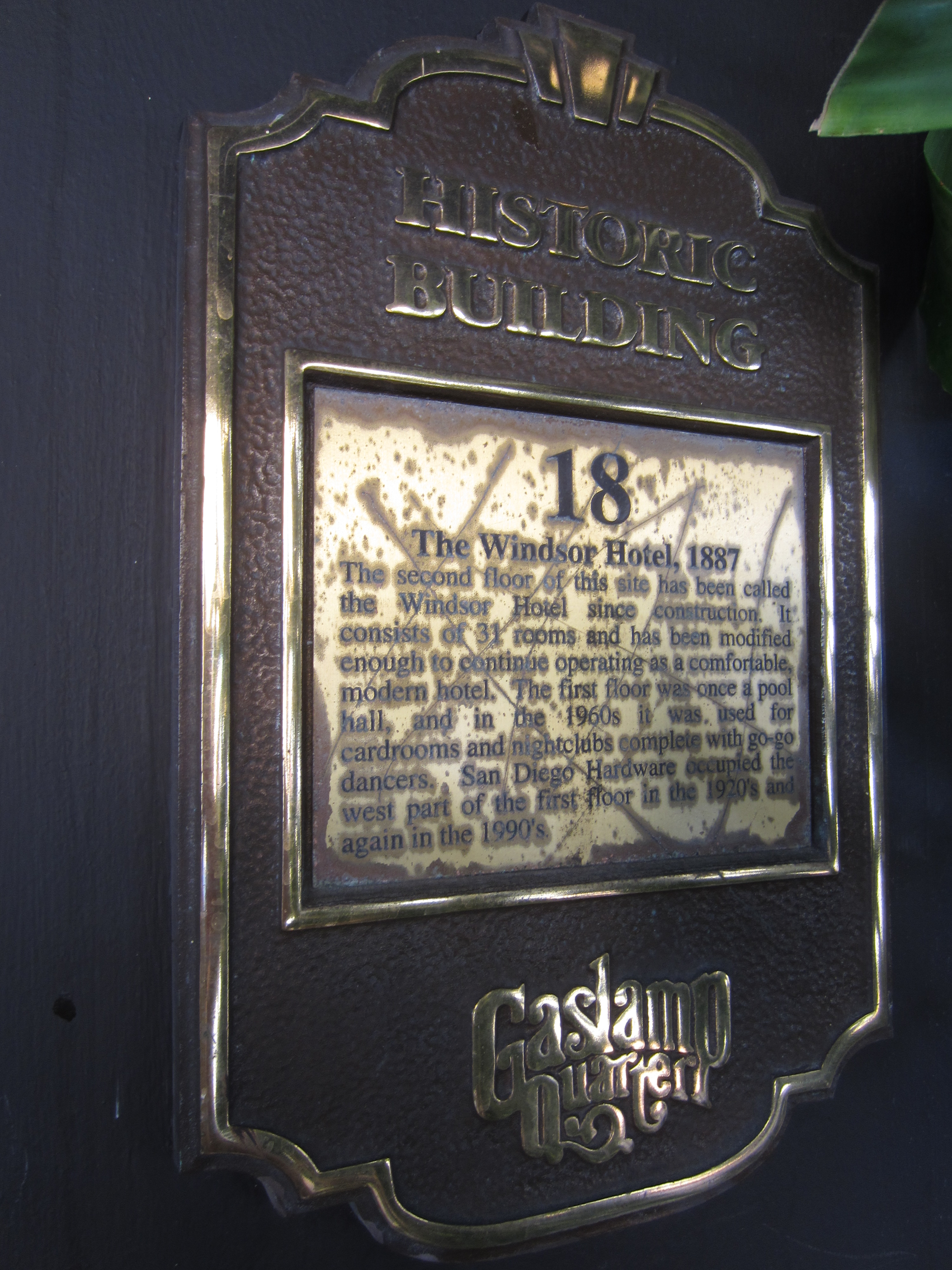
Plaque for the building, 2016

== See also ==
- List of Gaslamp Quarter historic buildings
