= HMS Windsor =

Two ships of the Royal Navy have borne the name HMS Windsor, after the English town of Windsor, Berkshire:

- HMS Windsor (1695) was a 60-gun fourth rate launched in 1695. She was rebuilt in 1745 and broken up in 1777.
- HMS Windsor (D42) was a W-class destroyer launched in 1918. She was sold in 1947 and scrapped in 1949.

== See also ==
- HMS Windsor Castle was the name of several Royal Navy ships
- HMCS Windsor was the Upholder-class submarine HMS Unicorn launched in 1993 and decommissioned in 1995. She was sold to the Royal Canadian Navy in 2001 and renamed HMCS Windsor after the city of Windsor, Ontario.
