= Windsor (village), New York =

Windsor, New York
- Village
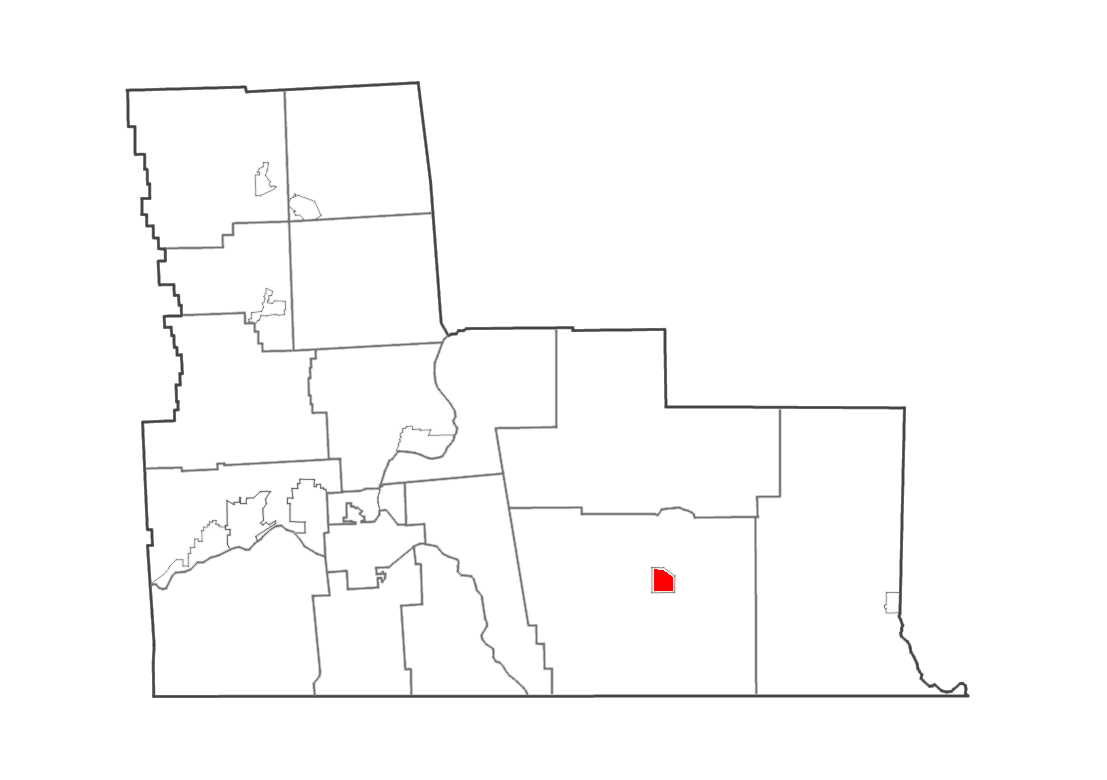
- Location in Broome County

- Location within New York Location within the United States
- Coordinates: 42°4′30″N 75°38′21″W
- Country: United States
- State: New York
- County: Broome
- Town: Windsor

Area
  - Total: 1.17 sq mi (3.02 km^{2})
  - Land: 1.10 sq mi (2.85 km^{2})
  - Water: 0.066 sq mi (0.17 km^{2})
- Elevation: 950 ft (290 m)

Population (2020)
  - Total: 907
  - Density: 825.0/sq mi (318.53/km^{2})
- Time zone: UTC-5 (Eastern (EST))
  - Summer (DST): UTC-4 (EDT)
- ZIP Code: 13865
- Area code: 607
- FIPS code: 36-82524
- GNIS feature ID: 0971474
- Website: www.villageofwindsor.org

Windsor is a village in Broome County, New York, United States. The population was 916 at the 2010 census. It is part of the Binghamton Metropolitan Statistical Area. It is located near the middle of the town Windsor, and is the principal settlement in that town. The village is east of Binghamton.

== History ==
Windsor is the site of the historic Seneca village of Onaquaga, which was one of 40 destroyed by the Continental Army in October 1778 during Sullivan's Expedition.

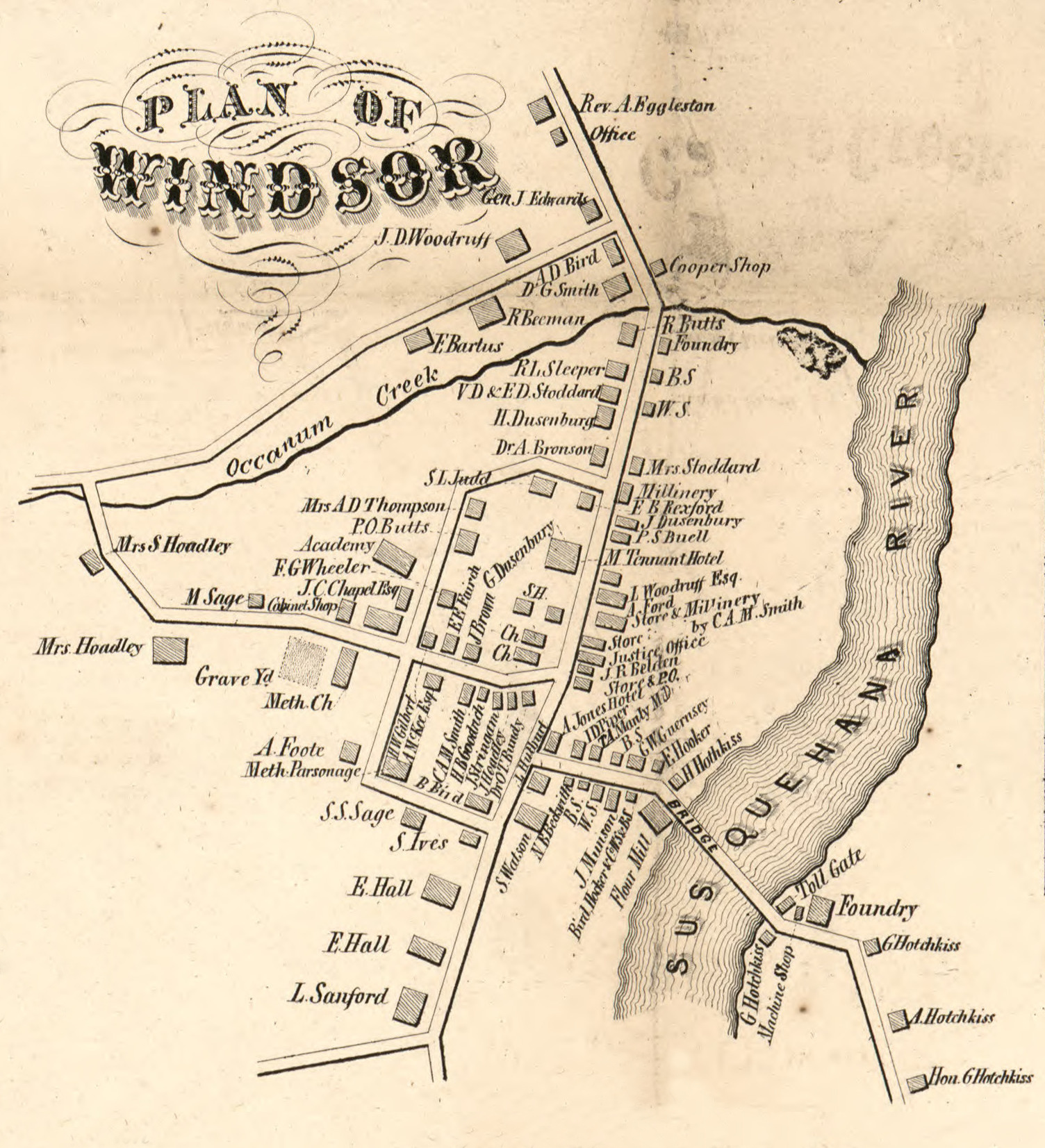
Plan of Windor (1855)

In 1830, the new village was founded as a commercial settlement, and it soon outstripped its rival to the north, Ouaquaga. The village was incorporated in 1896.

The Windsor Village Historic District was listed on the National Register of Historic Places in 1980. The Jedediah Hotchkiss House was listed in 1982.

== Geography ==
According to the United States Census Bureau, the village has a total area of 1.2 square miles (3 km^{2}), of which 1.1 square miles (2.8 km^{2}) is land and 0.077 square miles (.2 km^{2}), or 6.15%, is water.

Windsor is on the west bank of the Susquehanna River and is located along the conjoined Interstate 86 and New York State Route 17 at the junction of New York State Route 79.

== Demographics ==
Historical population
Census	Pop.	Note	%±
1890	524		—
1900	739		41.0%
1910	637		−13.8%
1920	598		−6.1%
1930	661		10.5%
1940	766		15.9%
1950	822		7.3%
1960	1,026		24.8%
1970	1,098		7.0%
1980	1,155		5.2%
1990	1,051		−9.0%
2000	901		−14.3%
2010	916		1.7%
2020	907		−1.0%
U.S. Decennial Census

As of the census of 2000, there were 901 people, 369 households, and 250 families residing in the village. The population density was 833.6 inhabitants per square mile (321.9/km^{2}). There were 422 housing units at an average density of 390.4 per square mile (150.7/km^{2}). The racial makeup of the village was 95.78% White, 1.22% Black or African American, 0.89% Native American, 0.55% Asian, 0.33% from other races, and 1.22% from two or more races. Hispanic or Latino of any race were 0.55% of the population.

There were 369 households, out of which 32.8% had children under the age of 18 living with them, 50.7% were married couples living together, 12.2% had a female householder with no husband present, and 32.0% were non-families. 29.0% of all households were made up of individuals, and 15.2% had someone living alone who was 65 years of age or older. The average household size was 2.44 and the average family size was 3.01.

In the village, the population was spread out, with 27.7% under the age of 18, 6.3% from 18 to 24, 27.9% from 25 to 44, 21.3% from 45 to 64, and 16.8% who were 65 years of age or older. The median age was 39 years. For every 100 females, there were 88.5 males. For every 100 females age 18 and over, there were 83.4 males.

The median income for a household in the village was $37,500, and the median income for a family was $46,563. Males had a median income of $35,000 versus $21,298 for females. The per capita income for the village was $18,168. About 8.4% of families and 10.0% of the population were below the poverty line, including 16.7% of those under age 18 and 4.3% of those age 65 or over.

== Notable residents ==
- Jason Houghtaling, Coach, Tennessee Titans
- Joseph H. Brownell, member of the New York State Assembly
- Giles W. Hotchkiss (1815-1878), US congressman
