= Windsor Park (disambiguation) =

Windsor Park is the home ground of the Northern Ireland national football team.

It may also refer to:

In Australia

- Windsor Park, Tasmania, group of regional sporting grounds in Launceston, Australia
- Windsor Park, a sporting ground in Norlane, Victoria, Australia

In Canada

- Windsor Park, Halifax, Nova Scotia, military housing & transport base, part of CFB Halifax
- Windsor Park (Edmonton), a neighbourhood in Edmonton, Alberta
- Windsor Park, Calgary, a neighbourhood in Calgary, Alberta
- Windsor Park, Winnipeg, a neighbourhood in Winnipeg Manitoba

In Dominica

- Windsor Park (Dominica), a cricket stadium for the West Indies cricket team in Roseau, Dominica

In England

- Windsor Great Park, a deer park on the border of Berkshire and Surrey

In New Zealand

- Windsor Park, New Zealand, a suburb of Auckland

In the United States of America

- Windsor Park, a neighborhood in Austin, Texas
- Windsor Park, a neighborhood in Queens, New York
- Windsor Park, a neighborhood in Alexandria, Virginia
- Windsor Park, a neighborhood adjacent to Lake Michigan in the community of South Shore, Chicago, Illinois
  - 75th Street/Windsor Park station, a rail station in the neighborhood
- Windsor Park, a neighborhood in Indianapolis, Indiana
- Windsor Park Mall, San Antonio, Texas, a defunct shopping mall
