= HMS Windsor Castle =

Six ships of the Royal Navy have borne the name HMS Windsor Castle, after Windsor Castle, an official residence of the English and British monarchs:

- HMS Windsor Castle (1679) was a 90-gun second-rate ship of the line launched in 1678 and wrecked in 1693.
- HMS Windsor Castle was a 90-gun second rate previously named HMS Duchess. She was launched in 1679, renamed HMS Princess Anne in 1701, HMS Windsor Castle in 1702 and HMS Blenheim in 1706, before being broken up in 1763.
- HMS Windsor Castle (1790) was a 98-gun second-rate ship of the line launched in 1790. She was reduced to 74 guns in 1814 and was broken up in 1839.
- HMS Windsor Castle was a 120-gun first rate. She was renamed HMS Duke of Wellington a month after being launched as a screw-propelled ship in 1852.
- HMS Windsor Castle (1858) was laid down as a 116-gun first rate named HMS Victoria, but was renamed in 1855 before being launched in 1858. She had been converted to a 100-gun screw-propelled ship on the stocks, and was rearmed with 97 guns in 1862. She was renamed HMS Cambridge in 1869, when she replaced the 1815 vessel as a gunnery school ship. She was sold in 1908.
- HMS Windsor Castle (1918) was an ex-Russian merchant ship, seized in 1918 or 1919 and converted to an armed merchantman in the British Caspian Flotilla.

== See also ==
- HMY Victoria and Albert, a wood paddle Royal yacht launched in 1855 was previously named Windsor Castle, but was renamed in 1854 before her launch.
- HMS Windsor
- Capture of the Jeune Richard, in which the UK Post Office's packet ship Windsor Castle captured the more heavily armed French privateer Jeune Richard in a notable single-ship action.
- Windsor Castle (disambiguation)
