= Windsor Park Hotel =

Coordinates: 46.50883°N 84.32959°W

Windsor Park Hotel is a former hotel, Algoma University residence and seniors residence in downtown Sault Ste. Marie, Ontario, Canada.

First built in 1895 as Windsor Hotel, addition added in 1919 by local architectural firm Findlay and Foulis and again in 1931 with the nine-floor high rise block. and was the tallest building in the city from 1931 to 1974 (surpassed by the Senior Citizens Tower at Bay and Brock streets).

The once luxury hotel ceased operations after bankruptcy in 1996 becoming Windsor Park Retirement Residences and then donated as student residences for Algoma University from 2010 to 2015 before being sold again in 2015. The building is planned to be restored and reused as senior residences once again by the new owners.
