= Windsor Village Historic District (Windsor, New York) =

Historic district in New York, United States

- U.S. National Register of Historic Places
- U.S. Historic district
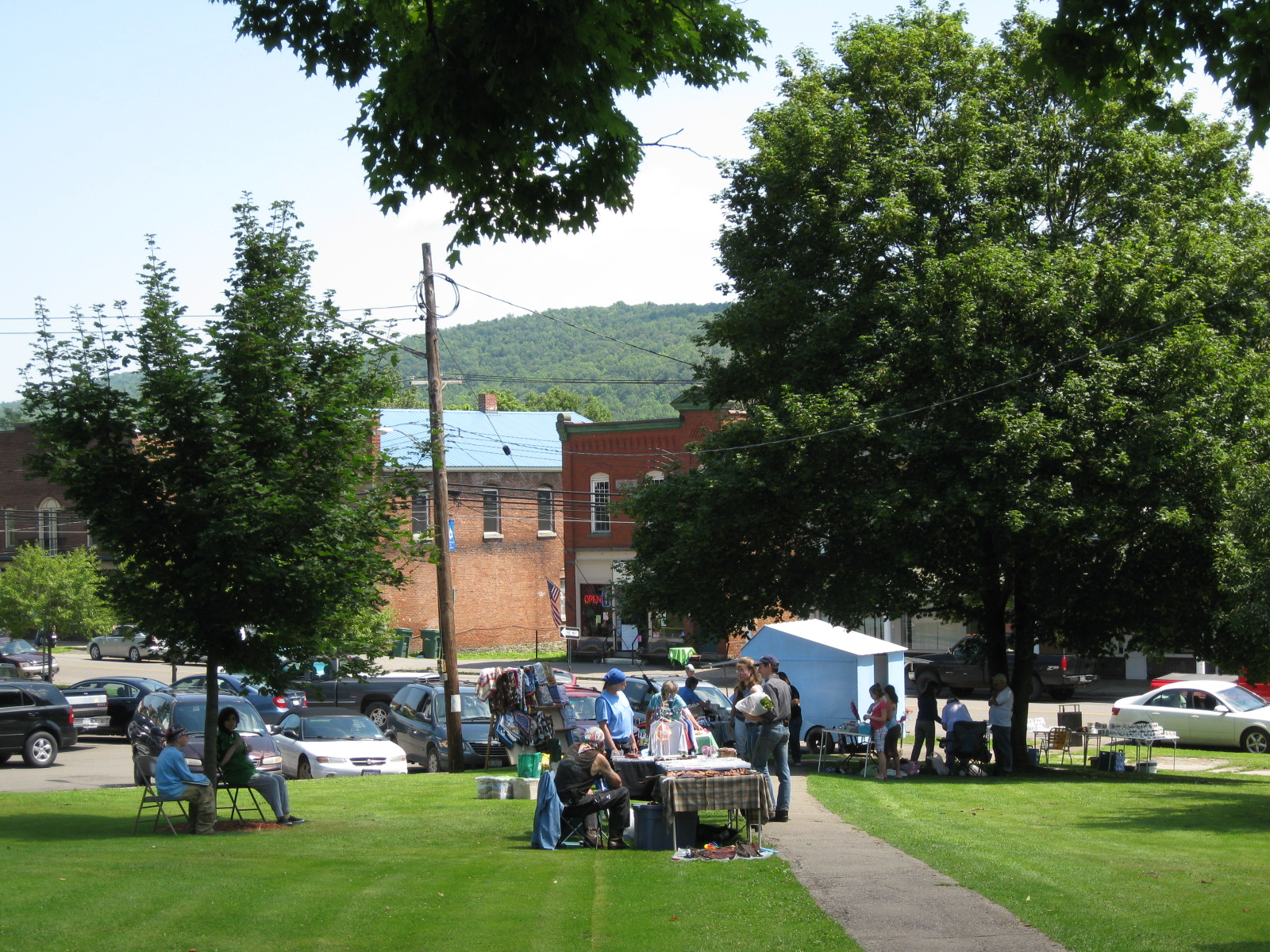
- Windsor Village Green, August 2009

- Location within New York Location within the United States
- Location: College Ave., Academy, Chapel, Church, Dewey, Elm and Main Sts., Windsor, New York
- Coordinates: 42°4′39″N 75°38′39″W
- Area: 55 acres (22 ha)
- Built: 1810
- Architectural style: Greek Revival, Italianate, Queen Anne
- NRHP reference No.: 80002593
- Added to NRHP: July 30, 1980

Windsor Village Historic District is a national historic district located at Windsor in Broome County, New York. The district includes 70 contributing buildings, two contributing sites (village cemetery and village green), and one contributing structure (bandstand). The district includes the core of the business district and many older residential streets. The oldest building dates to about 1810.

It was listed on the National Register of Historic Places in 1980.
