= Windsor Township =

Windsor Township may refer to the following places:

- Windsor Township, Shelby County, Illinois
- Windsor Township, Fayette County, Iowa
- Windsor Township, Cowley County, Kansas
- Windsor Township, Eaton County, Michigan (Windsor Charter Township, Michigan)
- Windsor Township, Traverse County, Minnesota
- Windsor Township, Jefferson County, Missouri
- Windsor Township, Henry County, Missouri
- Windsor Township, New Jersey, former township divided into:
  - East Windsor Township, Mercer County, New Jersey
  - West Windsor Township, Mercer County, New Jersey
- Windsor Township, Bertie County, North Carolina
- Winston Township, Forsyth County, North Carolina
- Windsor Township, Stutsman County, North Dakota
- Windsor Township, Ashtabula County, Ohio
- Windsor Township, Lawrence County, Ohio
- Windsor Township, Morgan County, Ohio
- Windsor Township, Pennsylvania
  - Windsor Township, Berks County, Pennsylvania
  - Windsor Township, York County, Pennsylvania
  - and also: Lower Windsor Township, Pennsylvania

== See also ==
- Windsor (disambiguation)
- Winsor Township (disambiguation)
