= Winsor, Newfoundland and Labrador =

Settlement in Newfoundland and Labrador

Coordinates: 49.147°N 53.551°W

Location of Winsor in Newfoundland and Labrador

Winsor is a settlement in the municipality of New-Wes-Valley in Newfoundland and Labrador.

== Winsor Family ==
The community is named for the John Winsor (1759-1822) who first settled in nearby Swain's Island in 1810.

During the 19th and early 20th Century many members of the Winsor family became involved in sealing, working as steamer captains:

- William Winsor, Sr
- Jesse Winsor
- Samuel Winsor

Descendants of John Winsor served in pre-Confederation House of Assembly of the Newfoundland as for Bonavista Bay and Bonavista North:

- Robert G. Winsor - Liberal MHA 1874-1878
- William C. Winsor - Conservative MHA 1882-1885
- William C. Winsor - Newfoundland People's Party MHA and Dominion Government cabinet minister
- Robert G. Winsor - Fishermen's Protective Union MHA
- Nathan G. Winsor - MHA and Executive Councillor
