= New Windsor Historic District =

Historic district in Maryland, United States

- U.S. National Register of Historic Places
- U.S. Historic district
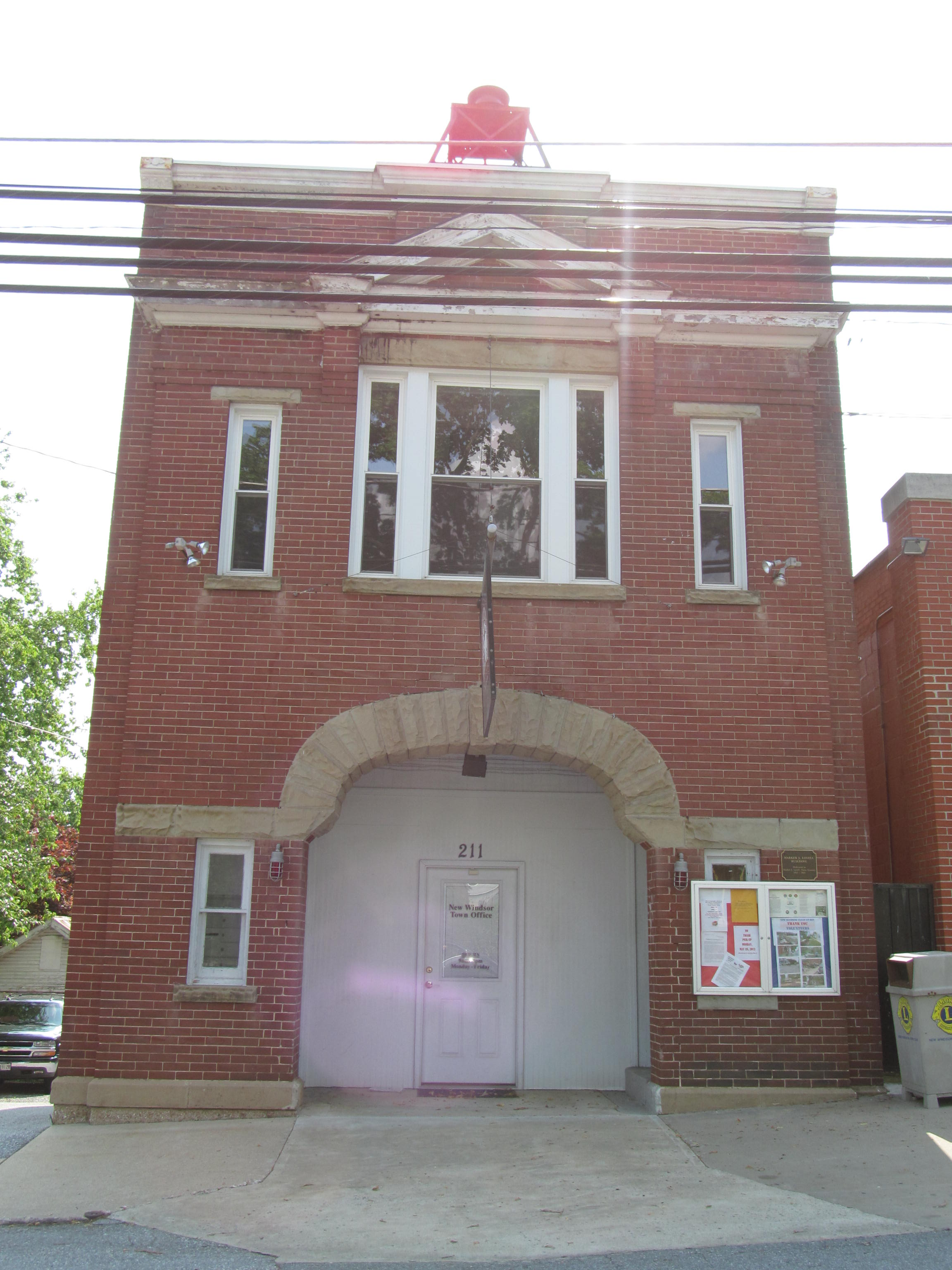
- New Windsor town hall and fire station

- Location within Maryland Location within the United States
- Location: Roughly bounded by Park, and Springdale Aves., New Windsor Rd., Lambert Ave., Coe Dr., and Maine St., New Windsor, Maryland
- Coordinates: 39°32′33″N 77°6′21″W
- Area: 98 acres (40 ha)
- Architect: Multiple
- Architectural style: Queen Anne, Colonial Revival, Bungalow/craftsman
- NRHP reference No.: 97000925
- Added to NRHP: August 21, 1997

New Windsor Historic District is a national historic district at New Windsor, Carroll County, Maryland, United States. The district contains a wide variety of domestic, commercial, public, educational, and religious resources reflecting the development of the town from its founding in 1796 up to the World War II era. Most common homes are 2- or 2 1/2-story center-entrance or center-passage plan dwellings, of both three and five bays, and three-bay side-passage plan houses.

It was added to the National Register of Historic Places in 1997.
