= Windsor Hills Historic District =

Historic district in Maryland, United States

- U.S. National Register of Historic Places
- U.S. Historic district
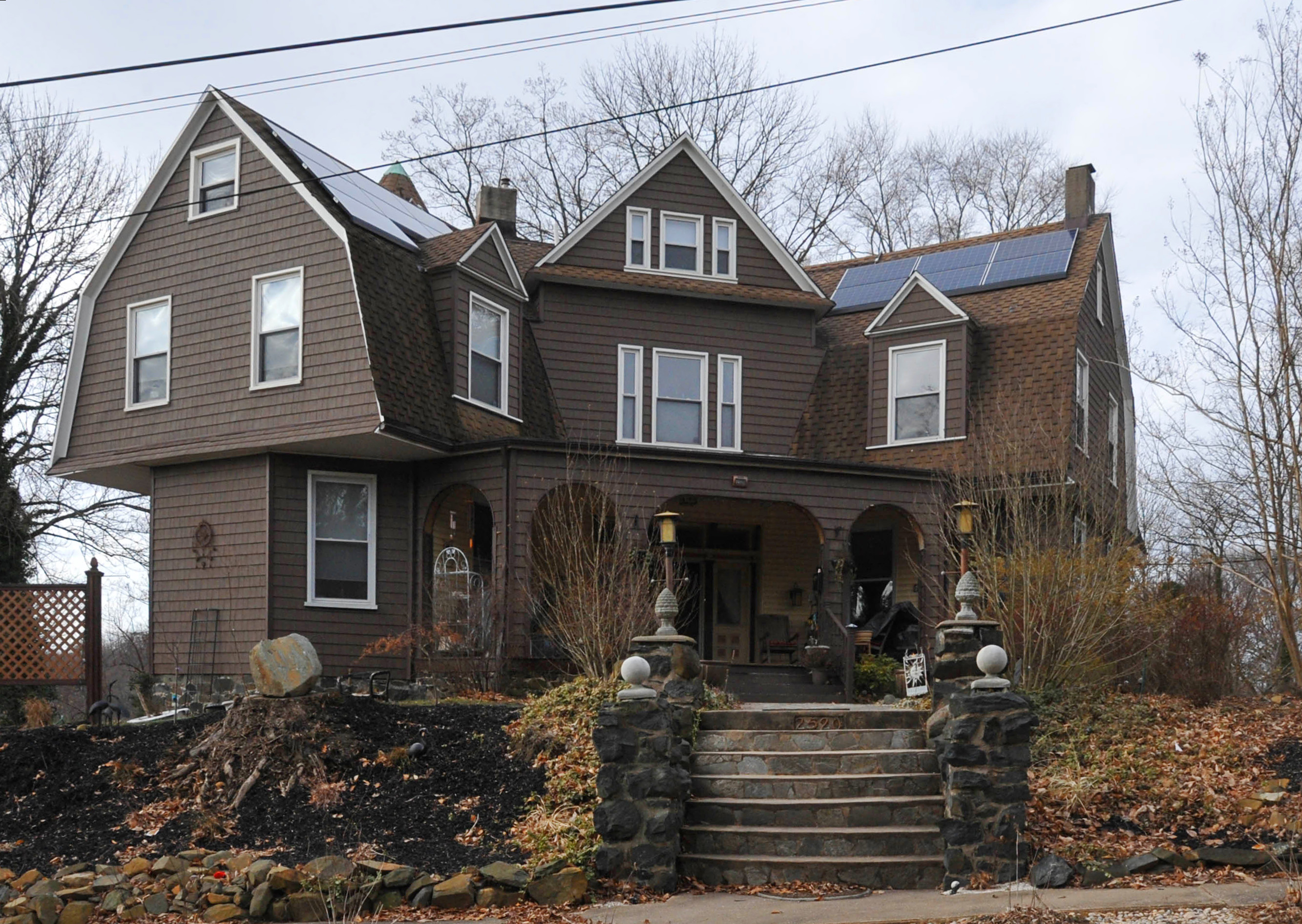

- Location within Baltimore Location within Maryland Location within the United States
- Location: Roughly bounded by Chelsea Terrace, Windsor Mill Rd., Talbot Rd., Westchester Rd., and Woodhaven Ave., Baltimore, Maryland
- Coordinates: 39°18′59″N 76°41′11″W
- Area: 170 acres (69 ha)
- Architect: multiple
- Architectural style: Shingle Style, Bungalow/craftsman, et al.
- NRHP reference No.: 02001610
- Added to NRHP: December 27, 2002

Windsor Hills Historic District is a national historic district in Baltimore, Maryland, United States. It is a residential suburb defined by rolling topography, winding streets, stone garden walls, walks and private alley ways, early-20th century garden apartments, duplexes, and freestanding residences. Structures are predominantly of frame construction with locally quarried stone foundations. There are no commercial buildings and only two public buildings: Mt. Shiloh AME Church and Windsor Elementary School.

== History ==
Thomas Winans, the son of inventor Ross Winans, had an interest in land speculation and owned some of the land that would become Windsor Hills. The first two residences constructed in Windsor Hills were a pair of Italian villas built sometime after the Civil War and were named Tusculum and Monticello after local schools rub by Adele and Alfred Bujac. One of the Monticello remained standing until being torn down by the City of Baltimore in 1925 and replaced by an elementary school. Tusculum would likewise be replaced by the Mt. Shiloh AME Church. Edwin L. Tunis purchased the holdings of Thomas Winans and several others in 1889. The Tunis family settled in the area and heavily influenced the regional style that would develop. Windsor Hills developed over a period from about 1895 through 1930. The dominant styles include Shingle cottages, Dutch Colonial Revival houses, Foursquares, and Craftsman Bungalows. Trolley service to downtown Baltimore began in 1902.

It was added to the National Register of Historic Places in 2002.
