= Lucknow Brigade =

Lucknow Brigade 22nd (Lucknow) Brigade
- Active: June 1907 – January 1916; July 1917 – December 1941
- Country: British India
- Allegiance: British Crown
- Branch: British Indian Army
- Type: Infantry
- Size: Brigade
- Part of: 8th (Lucknow) Division; Indian Expeditionary Force E 11th Indian Division
- Garrison/HQ: Lucknow
- Engagements: First World War Sinai and Palestine Campaign Actions on the Suez Canal

Commanders
- Notable commanders: Maj.-Gen. A. Wilson

The Lucknow Brigade was an infantry brigade of the British Indian Army formed in 1907 as a result of the Kitchener Reforms. It was mobilized as 22nd (Lucknow) Brigade at the outbreak of the First World War as part of Indian Expeditionary Force E. It served in Egypt in 1915 before being broken up in January 1916.

The brigade was reformed in India in 1917 for internal security duties and to aid the expansion of the Indian Army in the last year of the war. It remained part of the British Indian Army between the wars under several designations and was the 6th (Lucknow) Infantry Brigade in September 1939.

== History ==
The Kitchener Reforms, carried out during Lord Kitchener's tenure as Commander-in-Chief, India (1902–09), completed the unification of the three former Presidency armies, the Punjab Frontier Force, the Hyderabad Contingent and other local forces into one Indian Army. Kitchener identified the Indian Army's main task as the defence of the North-West Frontier against foreign aggression (particularly Russian expansion into Afghanistan) with internal security relegated to a secondary role. The Army was organized into divisions and brigades that would act as field formations but also included internal security troops.

The Lucknow Brigade was formed in June 1907 (Note: 1 June 1907 was the appointment date of the first commanding officer of the brigade.) as a result of the Kitchener Reforms. The brigade formed part of the 8th (Lucknow) Division.

22nd (Lucknow) Brigade

In October 1914, the brigade was mobilized as the 22nd (Lucknow) Brigade and was sent to Egypt as the core of Indian Expeditionary Force E. The brigade joined the 11th Indian Division when it was formed in Egypt on 24 December and served on the Suez Canal Defences. After the defeat of the Turkish attempts to cross the canal on 3–4 February 1915, the division acted as a relieving depot for the divisions in France. (Note: The infantry divisions in France were the 3rd (Lahore) and 7th (Meerut).) It was broken up on 31 May 1915 and the brigade came under direct command of the Suez Canal Defences. The brigade was broken up in January 1916.

Reformed brigade

The Lucknow Brigade was reformed in 8th (Lucknow) Division in July 1917. It remained with the division for the rest of the war, carrying out internal security duties. In the final year of the war, the division (and brigade) took part in the general expansion of the Indian Army as new units were formed.

Post-war

The brigade remained part of the British Indian Army after the end of the war. It underwent a number of changes of designation between the World Wars: 73rd Indian Infantry Brigade from May until September 1920, 19th Indian Infantry Brigade from November 1920 and 6th (Lucknow) Infantry Brigade from sometime in the 1920s. For its subsequent history, see 6th (Lucknow) Infantry Brigade.

== Orders of battle ==
In India in August 1914
At the outbreak of the First World War, the brigade had the following composition:
- 3rd Battalion, Royal Fusiliers (City of London Regiment) (left in October 1914 and joined 85th Brigade in the British 28th Division on 24 December 1914 in the United Kingdom)
- 1st Battalion, King's Own Scottish Borderers
- 17th Infantry (The Loyal Regiment) (left in September 1914 for Mauritius)
- 128th Pioneers (left in October 1914 and joined 31st Indian Brigade in Egypt)
- U Battery, Royal Horse Artillery (joined 8th (Lucknow) Cavalry Brigade in September 1914 and departed for the Western Front with 1st Indian Cavalry Division)
- V Brigade, Royal Field Artillery – 63rd, 64th and 73rd Batteries (joined 7th (Meerut) Division in August 1914 and departed for the Western Front)

Egypt
The brigade was extensively reorganized on mobilization. Its composition while it was in Egypt included:
- 1st Battalion, King's Own Scottish Borderers (left on 14 December 1914 and joined 87th Brigade in the British 29th Division in January 1915 in the United Kingdom)
- 62nd Punjabis (joined in October 1914 from Allahabad Brigade, 8th (Lucknow) Division; transferred to 28th Indian Brigade, 10th Indian Division on 9 July 1915)
- 92nd Punjabis (joined in October 1914 from Allahabad Brigade, 8th (Lucknow) Division; left for Mesopotamia in December 1915 where it joined 19th (Dehra Dun) Brigade, 7th (Meerut) Division)
- 2nd Battalion, 10th Gurkha Rifles (joined in October 1914 from Presidency Brigade, 8th (Lucknow) Division; transferred to 29th Indian Brigade, 10th Indian Division in June 1915)
- 3rd Brahmans (joined on 29 December 1914 from Jhansi Brigade, 5th (Mhow) Division; transferred to Mesopotamia in December 1915)
- 125th Napier's Rifles (joined on 12 June 1915 from 21st (Bareilly) Brigade, 7th (Meerut) Division; transferred to 32nd Indian Brigade, 11th Indian Division on 19 September 1915)
- 9th Bhopal Infantry (joined in June 1915 from 7th (Ferozepore) Brigade, 3rd (Lahore) Division; transferred to Mesopotamia in December 1915)
- 1st Battalion, Patiala Infantry (I.S.) (joined on 16 September 1915 from 32nd Indian Brigade, 11th Indian Division; transferred in January 1916 to 31st Indian Brigade, 10th Indian Division)
- 41st Dogras (joined on 16 September 1915 from 21st (Bareilly) Brigade, 7th (Meerut) Division; transferred to Mesopotamia in December 1915)

Reformed brigade
The reformed brigade commanded the following units:
- 1/10th Battalion, Duke of Cambridge's Own (Middlesex Regiment) (at Lucknow and joined the brigade on formation)
- 2nd Battalion, 97th Deccan Infantry (formed at Lucknow in June 1917 and to Allahabad Brigade in July; rejoined in March 1918 then departed on 18 May for Palestine where it joined 181st Brigade in the 60th (2/2nd London) Division on 28 June 1918)
- 1st Garrison Battalion, Royal Irish Rifles (joined from Allahabad Brigade in October 1917)
- 2nd Battalion, 1st Brahmans (formed in November 1917)
- 2nd Battalion, 11th Rajputs (formed in January 1918; transferred in October to Loralai, 4th (Quetta) Division)
- 1st Garrison Battalion, East Yorkshire Regiment (joined from Allahabad Brigade in March 1918)
- 2nd Battalion, 8th Rajputs (formed in March 1918)
- 2nd Battalion, 66th Punjabis (formed in October 1918)
- 133rd Regiment (joined in December 1918 from Nasirabad Brigade, 5th (Mhow) Division)

== Commanders ==
The brigade had the following commanders during its existence:

From	Rank	Name	Notes
1 June 1907	Major-General	Sir J. R. L. Macdonald	
November 1908	Brigadier-General	J. A. Bell	
1910	Major-General	H. B. B. Watkis	
22 October 1911	Major-General	A. Wilson	
16 November 1914	Brigadier-General	S. Geoghegan	
21 December 1915	Brigadier-General	W. A. Watson	Brigade broken up in January 1916
July 1917	Major-General	E. S. May	Brigade re-formed
26 November 1917	Brigadier-General	O. C. Wolley-Dod	
27 November 1918	Brigadier-General	A. G. Pritchard	
January 1920	Brigadier-General	H. de C. O'Grady	
December 1922	Brigadier-General	J. H. Keith Stewart	
December 1923	Brigadier-General	A. E. McNamara	
November 1926	Brigadier	J. Kennedy	
June 1930	Brigadier	O. H. L. Nicholson	
May 1933	Brigadier	K. McG. Laird	
June 1935	Brigadier	C. Hemsley	
February 1936	Brigadier	H. R. C. Lane	
December 1936	Brigadier	R. C. Money	
September 1939	Brigadier	W. O. Lay	

== See also ==
- 6th (Lucknow) Infantry Brigade in the Second World War
- 8th (Lucknow) Cavalry Brigade in the First World War
- Force in Egypt

== Bibliography ==
- Haythornthwaite, Philip J. (1996). The World War One Source Book. London: Arms and Armour Press. ISBN 1-85409-351-7.
- Kempton, Chris (2003b). 'Loyalty & Honour', The Indian Army September 1939 – August 1947. Vol. Part II Brigades. Milton Keynes: The Military Press. ISBN 0-85420-238-2.
- Mackie, Colin (June 2015). "Army Commands 1900-2011" (PDF). www.gulabin.com. Archived from the original (PDF) on 5 July 2015.
- Perry, F.W. (1993). Order of Battle of Divisions Part 5B. Indian Army Divisions. Newport: Ray Westlake Military Books. ISBN 1-871167-23-X.
