= 31st Indian Brigade =

Infantry brigade of the British Indian Army

- Active: 2 January 1915 – 13 February 1916
- Country: British India
- Allegiance: British Crown
- Branch: British Indian Army
- Type: Infantry
- Size: Brigade
- Part of: 11th Indian Division; 10th Indian Division
- Engagements: First World War Sinai and Palestine Campaign Actions on the Suez Canal

The 31st Indian Brigade was an infantry brigade of the British Indian Army that saw active service with the Indian Army during the First World War. It served in Egypt in 1915 before being broken up in February 1916.

== History ==
The 11th Indian Division was formed in Egypt on 24 December 1914, taking under command the 22nd (Lucknow) and 32nd (Imperial Service) Brigades. The 31st Indian Brigade was formed in January 1915 as the division's third brigade and served with it on the Suez Canal Defences. After the defeat of the Turkish attempts to cross the canal on 3–4 February 1915, the division acted as a relieving depot for the divisions in France. (Note: The infantry divisions in France were the 3rd (Lahore) and 7th (Meerut).) The division was broken up on 31 May 1915 and the brigade came under direct command of the Suez Canal Defences.

On 7 January 1916, the 10th Indian Division was reformed as part of the Suez Canal District, and the brigade joined it. The need to return depleted units that had served in France to India meant that this was short-lived. The brigade was broken up in February and the division followed in March.

== Orders of battle ==
11th Indian Division
The brigade had the following composition while serving with 11th Indian Division:
- 2nd Queen Victoria's Own Rajput Light Infantry (left Bombay Brigade, 6th Poona Divisional Area in October 1914 for Egypt; left in December 1915 for Mesopotamia and joined 21st (Bareilly) Brigade, 7th (Meerut) Division)
- 27th Punjabis (left Derajat Brigade in October 1914 for Egypt; left in September 1915 for Mesopotamia and joined 9th (Sirhind) Brigade, 3rd (Lahore) Division)
- 93rd Burma Infantry (left Presidency Brigade, 8th (Lucknow) Division in October 1914 for Egypt; left in August 1915 for Mesopotamia and joined 19th (Dehra Dun) Brigade, 7th (Meerut) Division)
- 128th Pioneers (left Lucknow Brigade, 8th (Lucknow) Division in October 1914 for Egypt; left in December 1915 for Mesopotamia and joined 7th (Meerut) Division as divisional pioneers)
- 6th Jat Light Infantry (joined in August 1915 from 19th (Dehra Dun) Brigade, 7th (Meerut) Division; left in December 1915 for Mesopotamia and joined 21st (Bareilly) Brigade, 7th (Meerut) Division)

10th Indian Division
The brigade was extensively reorganized for service with 10th Indian Division:
- 58th Vaughan's Rifles (Frontier Force) (joined in January 1916 from 21st (Bareilly) Brigade, 7th (Meerut) Division; left in March and joined 20th Indian Brigade)
- 1st Battalion, 4th Gurkha Rifles (joined in January 1916 from 29th Indian Brigade; left in February and joined 44th (Ferozepore) Brigade, 3rd Lahore Divisional Area)
- 2nd Battalion, 8th Gurkha Rifles (joined in January 1916 from 20th Indian Brigade; left in February for Lansdowne in 7th Meerut Divisional Area)
- 1st Battalion, Patiala Infantry (I.S.) (joined in January 1916 from 32nd (Imperial Service) Brigade; to 29th Indian Brigade in February)

== Commander ==
The brigade was commanded throughout its existence by Brigadier-General A.H. Bingley.

== See also ==
- Force in Egypt

== Bibliography ==
- Perry, F.W. (1993). Order of Battle of Divisions Part 5B. Indian Army Divisions. Newport: Ray Westlake Military Books. ISBN 1-871167-23-X.
