= 29th Indian Brigade =

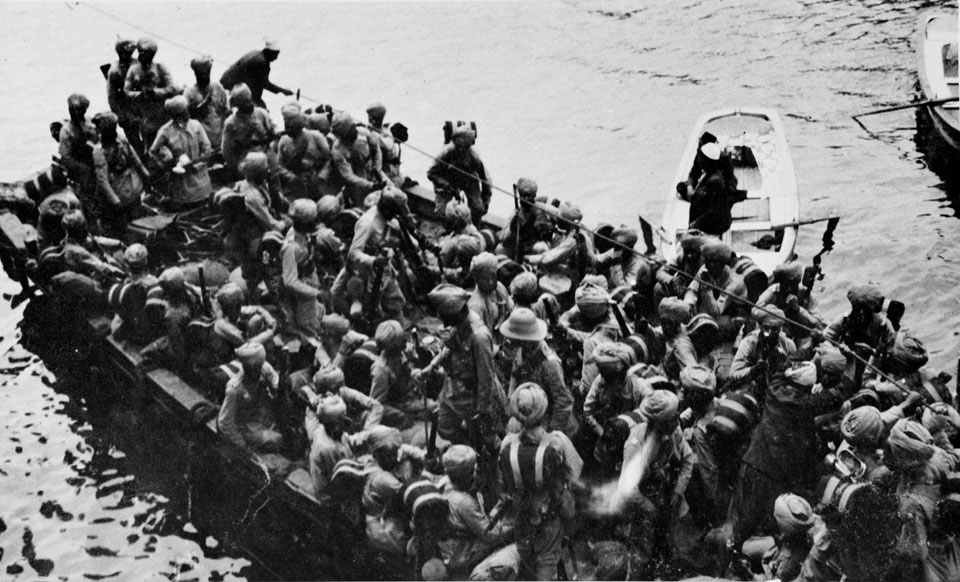
- 29th Indian Brigade landing at Cape Helles, Gallipoli
- Active: 31 October 1914 – 25 June 1917
- Country: India
- Allegiance: British Crown
- Branch: British Indian Army
- Type: Infantry
- Size: Brigade
- Part of: 10th Indian Division att. to British 29th Division
- Engagements: First World War South Arabia Raid on Sheik Saiad Sinai and Palestine campaign Actions on the Suez Canal Gallipoli campaign Third Battle of Krithia Battle of Gully Ravine Battle of Sari Bair

Commanders
- Notable commanders: Maj.-Gen. H.V. Cox; Br.-Gen. P.C. Palin

The 29th Indian Brigade was an infantry brigade of the British Indian Army that saw active service with the Indian Army during the First World War. Formed in October 1914, it raided Sheik Saiad en route to Egypt, defended the Suez Canal in early 1915, before taking part in the Gallipoli Campaign (April to December 1915). On returning to Egypt it acted as an independent formation being broken up in June 1917.

== History ==
Formation

The 29th Indian Brigade was formed in October 1914 as part of Indian Expeditionary Force F (along with the 28th and 30th Indian Brigades) and sent to Egypt. En route to Egypt it raided Sheik Saiad (10–11 November). The Ottoman Empire maintained a small fort at Sheik Saiad guarding the entrance to the Red Sea. Having destroyed the Ottoman fortifications, the brigade re-embarked and continued on to Suez.

10th Indian Division

After arriving in Egypt, it joined the 10th Indian Division when it was formed on 24 December. It served on the Suez Canal Defences, notably taking part in the Actions on the Suez Canal on 3–4 February 1915. After the defeat of the Turkish attempts to cross the canal, the division was dispersed and the brigade was sent to Gallipoli in April 1915.

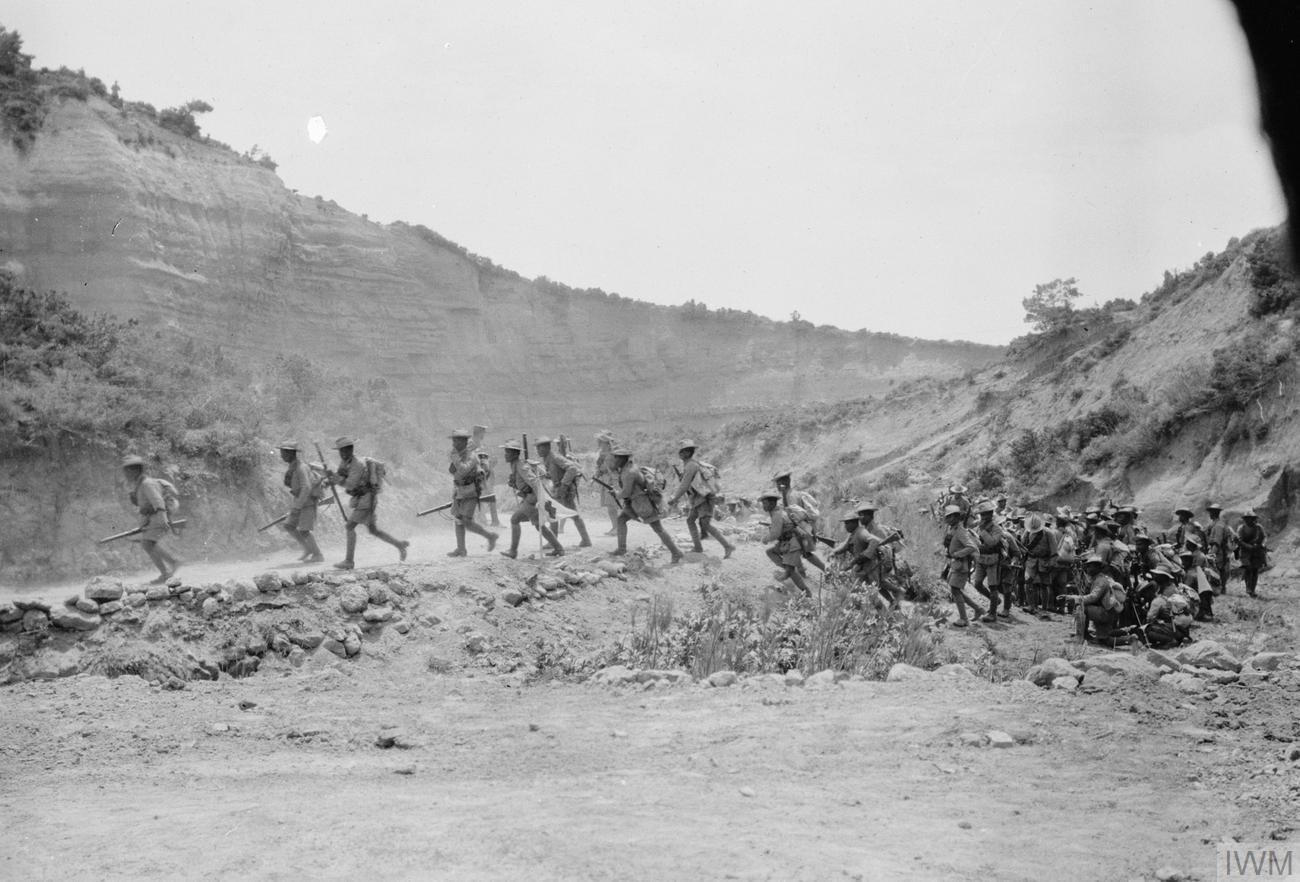
Gurkha soldiers of 29th Indian Brigade in Gallipoli, 1915

Gallipoli

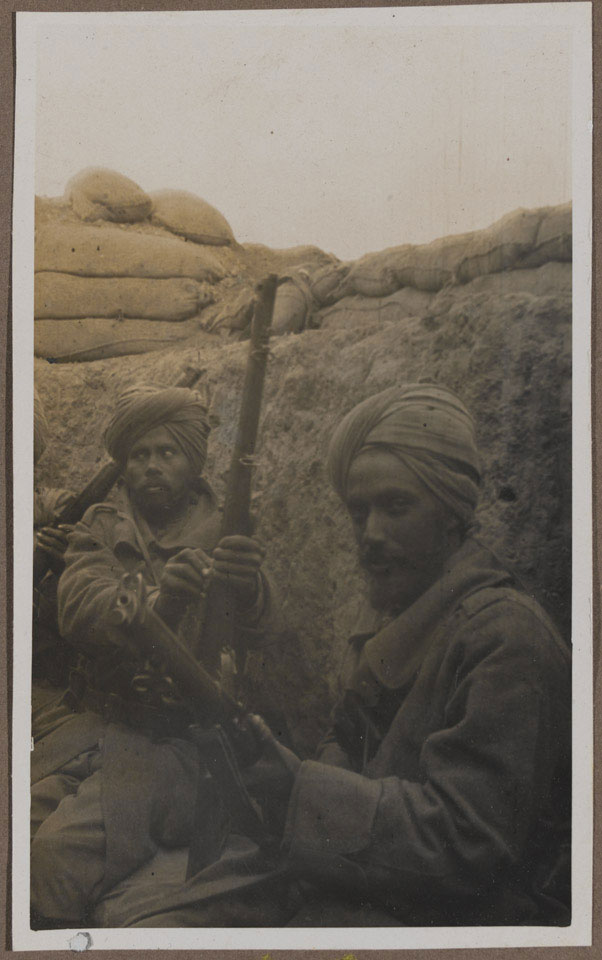
Sikh soldiers of 29th Indian Infantry Brigade rest in a trench.

The brigade formed Indian Expeditionary Force G for service in Gallipoli, the only Indian Army formation to serve on the peninsula. From 1 May to 7 July 1915 it was attached to the British 29th Division at Cape Helles. While with the division, it was in reserve for the Second Battle of Krithia (6–8 May), but played a more major role at Gurkha Bluff (12 May), the Third Battle of Krithia (4 June) and the Battle of Gully Ravine (28 June–2 July).

The brigade was switched to ANZAC Cove where it was attached to the Australian and New Zealand Army Corps, with which it took part in the Battle of Sari Bair (6–21 August 1915). 1st Battalion, 6th Gurkha Rifles was the only unit to reach the top of the ridge and see the Dardanelles; shelled by the Royal Navy, a Turkish counter-attack drove them off. The brigade's involvement at Gallipoli came at a high price: the 14th Sikhs, alone, suffered 264 killed and 840 wounded while serving at Gallipoli. (Note: An Indian infantry battalion had a strength of 13 British officers, 17 Indian officers and 723 other ranks. Such losses represented approximately 150% of this strength.)

Independent

On 7 January 1916, the 10th Indian Division was reformed as part of the Suez Canal District, and the brigade joined it. The need to return depleted units that had served in France to India meant that this was short-lived. The division was broken up on 7 March and the brigade became an independent formation. It continued to serve on the Suez Canal Defences.

In March 1917, the Egyptian Expeditionary Force started forming the British 75th Division, originally to be made up of Territorial Force battalions arriving from India. In May 1917, to speed up the formation of the division, it was decided to incorporate Indian battalions. To this end, the 29th Indian Brigade was broken up in June 1917 and its battalions posted to 75th Division.

== Orders of battle ==
With 10th Division in Egypt
The brigade had the following composition from formation and while assigned to 10th Indian Division in Egypt:
- 14th King George's Own Ferozepore Sikhs (joined from 1st (Peshawar) Brigade, 1st (Peshawar) Division)
- 69th Punjabis (joined from 5th (Jhelum) Brigade, 2nd (Rawalpindi) Division)
- 89th Punjabis (joined from Presidency Brigade, 8th (Lucknow) Division)
- 1st Battalion, 6th Gurkha Rifles (joined from 3rd (Abbottabad) Brigade, 2nd (Rawalpindi) Division)

Gallipoli
The brigade commanded the following units during the Gallipoli Campaign:
- 14th King George's Own Ferozepore Sikhs
- 69th Punjabis (transferred in May 1915 to 21st (Bareilly) Brigade, 7th (Meerut) Division)
- 89th Punjabis (transferred in May 1915 to 7th (Ferozepore) Brigade, 3rd (Lahore) Division)
- 1st Battalion, 6th Gurkha Rifles
- 1st Battalion, 5th Gurkha Rifles (Frontier Force) (joined in June 1915 from 28th Indian Brigade, 10th Indian Division)
- 2nd Battalion, 10th Gurkha Rifles (joined in June 1915 from 22nd (Lucknow) Brigade, 11th Indian Division)
- 1st Battalion, 4th Gurkha Rifles (joined in October 1915 from 9th (Sirhind) Brigade, 3rd (Lahore) Division)

The 69th and 89th Punjabis served briefly at Gallipoli before departing for the Western Front. While serving at Gallipoli, the following units were attached to the brigade:

- 108th Indian Field Ambulance
- 23rd Mule Corps
- supply and transport column

Return to Egypt
After returning to Egypt, the battalions that had served at Gallipoli were gradually posted away:
- 14th King George's Own Ferozepore Sikhs (detached to Tor in February 1916 and transferred to Bushire in May)
- 1st Battalion, 4th Gurkha Rifles (transferred in December 1915 to 31st Indian Brigade, 10th Indian Division)
- 1st Battalion, 5th Gurkha Rifles (Frontier Force) (left for 1st (Peshawar) Brigade, 1st (Peshawar) Division in February 1916)
- 1st Battalion, 6th Gurkha Rifles (left for 1st (Peshawar) Brigade, 1st (Peshawar) Division in February 1916)
- 2nd Battalion, 10th Gurkha Rifles (left in January 1916 for Suez local defences)

Reformed and service as an independent formation
The brigade was gradually reformed as new battalions joined from February 1916 onwards:
- 57th Wilde's Rifles (Frontier Force) (joined in February 1916 from 7th (Ferozepore) Brigade, 3rd (Lahore) Division; transferred in June 1916 to East Africa)
- 1st Battalion, Patiala Infantry (I.S.) (joined in February 1916 from 31st Indian Brigade, 10th Indian Division; transferred in December 1916 to 20th Indian Brigade)
- 1st Battalion, 101st Grenadiers (joined on 4 September 1916 from East Africa; transferred on 10 April 1917 to 49th Indian Brigade)
- 2nd Battalion, 3rd Queen Alexandra's Own Gurkha Rifles (joined in December 1916 from 20th Indian Brigade; transferred on 24 June 1917 to 233rd Brigade, British 75th Division)
- 123rd Outram's Rifles (joined in January 1917 from Multan, 3rd Lahore Divisional Area; transferred on 1 July 1917 to 234th Brigade, British 75th Division)
- 2nd Battalion, 101st Grenadiers (formed in February 1917; transferred on 10 April 1917 to 49th Indian Brigade)
- 3rd Battalion, 3rd Queen Alexandra's Own Gurkha Rifles (formed in February 1917; transferred on 30 June 1917 to 233rd Brigade, British 75th Division)

== Commanders ==
The brigade had the following commanders:

From	Rank	Name	Notes
31 October 1914	Brigadier-General	H.V. Cox	subsequently commanded the Australian 4th Division
17 February 1915	Major General	H.V. Cox	subsequently commanded the Australian 4th Division
26 September 1915	Brigadier-General	P.C. Palin	
5 February 1917	Brigadier-General	E.R.B. Murray	
25 March 1917	Brigadier-General	P.C. Palin	subsequently commanded the British 75th Division

== See also ==
- Force in Egypt

== Bibliography ==
- Becke, Archibald F. (1935). Order of Battle of Divisions Part 1–The Regular British Divisions. London: HMSO. OCLC 4405016.
- Becke, Archibald F. (1937). Order of Battle of Divisions Part 2B. The 2nd-Line Territorial Force Divisions (57th–69th) with The Home-Service Divisions (71st–73rd) and 74th and 75th Divisions. London: HMSO. OCLC 4405016.
- Gaylor, John (1996). Sons of John Company: The Indian and Pakistan Armies 1903–1991 (2nd ed.). Tunbridge Wells: Parapress. ISBN 1-898594-41-4.
- Haythornthwaite, Philip J. (1996). The World War One Source Book. London: Arms and Armour Press. ISBN 1-85409-351-7.
- Perry, F.W. (1992). Order of Battle of Divisions Part 5A. The Divisions of Australia, Canada and New Zealand and those in East Africa. Newport: Ray Westlake Military Books. ISBN 1-871167-25-6.
- Perry, F.W. (1993). Order of Battle of Divisions Part 5B. Indian Army Divisions. Newport: Ray Westlake Military Books. ISBN 1-871167-23-X.
