= Force in Egypt =

- Principal battles of the Force in Egypt
- 1915: Defence of the Suez Canal

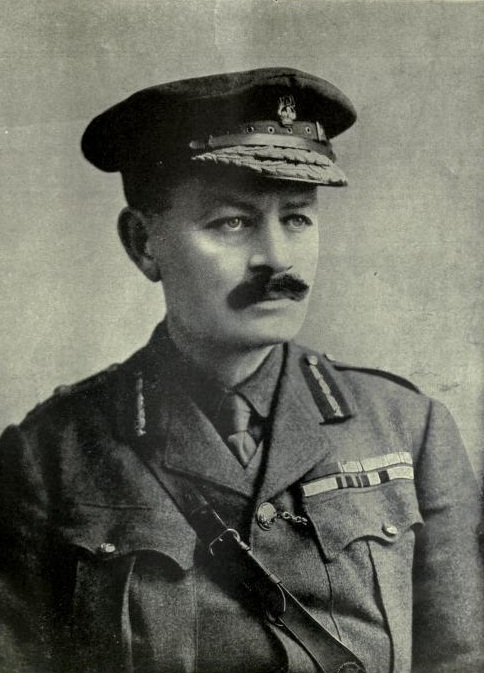
Major General Julian Byng, commander

The Force in Egypt was a British Army formation established in August 1914 to administer garrison forces in Egypt at the beginning of the First World War. The force had the objective of protecting the Suez Canal and was originally commanded by Major General Julian Byng, but he was replaced by General John Maxwell, who took command on 8 September 1914. Initially, the main threat to the Suez came from Germany and throughout the early months several of the force's elements were sent to Europe to take part in the fighting on the Western Front. On 5 November 1914, Britain and France declared war on the Ottoman Empire, after which the Force in Egypt faced a threat from Ottoman forces, which was realised in February 1915 with a raid on the Suez Canal. This threat remained until 1916 when the British forces went on the offensive.

The composition of the force changed several times due to the varying availability forces. By the end of 1914, the forces deployed in defence of the Suez Canal under Maxwell totalled approximately 30,000 troops. The main elements of this force were the 10th Indian Division (Major General A. Wilson), the 11th Indian Division, the Imperial Service Cavalry Brigade, and the Bikaner Camel Corps, as well as elements from the Indian Mountain Artillery and the Egyptian Army Artillery. In addition, several British and French warships in the canal served as floating batteries and there were several aircraft available for reconnaissance. Following the opening of the Gallipoli Campaign, the Force in Egypt was reduced mainly to a training and reinforcement camp until forces were withdrawn from the Gallipoli Peninsula and returned to Egypt in December 1915.

In 1916, the Force in Egypt was merged with the Mediterranean Expeditionary Force to form the Egyptian Expeditionary Force (EEF). General Sir Archibald Murray was given command and additional resources and the mission of the EEF changed from the defence of the Suez to an invasion of Palestine.

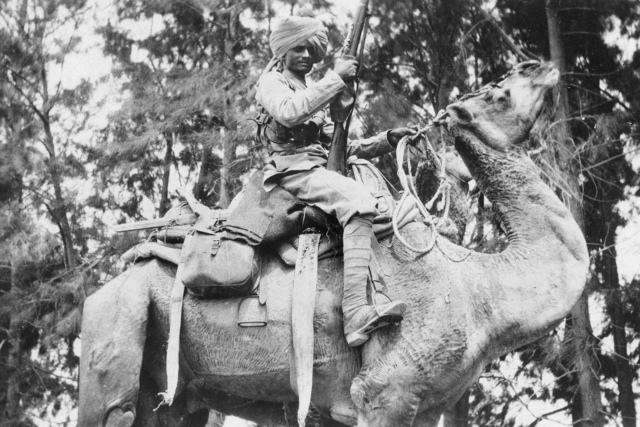
A member of the Bikaner Camel Corps

== August 1914 ==
3rd Dragoon Guards
T Battery, Royal Horse Artillery
7th Mountain Battery, Royal Garrison Artillery
2nd Field Company, Royal Engineers
2nd Battalion, Devonshire Regiment
1st Battalion, Worcestershire Regiment
2nd Battalion, Northamptonshire Regiment
2nd Battalion, Gordon Highlanders and auxiliary services.

== September 1914 ==
In addition to the above, two units from the 3rd (Lahore) Division were added:

9th (Sirhind) Brigade
III Mountain Artillery Brigade

Shortly afterwards, as a result of the Sinai frontier being crossed, Lord Kitchener ordered additional forces in the form of the East Lancashire Division (Territorial Force) with two Yeomanry regiments to follow, although several elements that were assigned to the Force in Egypt in August 1914 were shipped to France.

By October 1914, the 9th (Sirhind) Brigade was under orders to deploy to France but was retained until the 22nd (Lucknow) Brigade arrived.

The following forces were promised and on their way to Egypt in October 1914:

Bikaner Camel Corps
Imperial Service Cavalry Brigade
32nd (Imperial Service) Brigade

33rd Punjabis battalion (regular British Indian Army)
Alwar, Gwalior and Patiala Infantry battalions

eight Indian battalions
three more Indian brigades.

== January 1915 ==
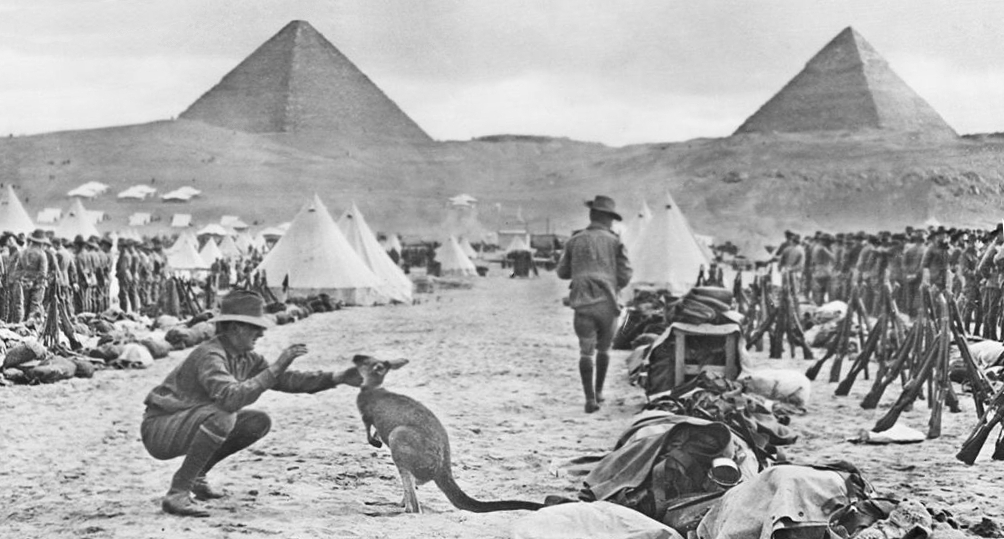
Australian troops in Egypt, December 1914

(total force 70,000)

10th Indian Division
11th Indian Division
Imperial Service Cavalry Brigade
Bikaner Camel Corps
Indian Mountain Artillery (three batteries)
Egyptian Army Artillery (one battery)
Royal Flying Corps detachment
French naval seaplanes

In training

Australian and New Zealand Army Corps (ANZAC)
42nd (East Lancashire) Division

== Suez Canal Defences: 15 January 1915 ==
Advanced Ordnance Depot Zagazig

one battalion from the 32nd (Imperial Service) Brigade

Garrison railway and Sweetwater Canal

one troop of Imperial Service Cavalry
a half company from the Bikaner Camel Corps
a half company of Indian infantry

General Reserve Camp, Moascar

31st Indian Brigade

2nd Queen Victoria's Own Rajput Light Infantry
27th Punjabis
93rd Burma Infantry
128th Pioneers

32nd (Imperial Service) Brigade

33rd Punjabis
Alwar, Gwalior and Imperial Service Cavalry Brigade less three squadrons and one troop

one Egyptian RE Section (camels)
one Egyptian Mountain Battery
two sections of field artillery with the Cavalry Brigade
Indian field ambulances.

=== Sector I: Port Tewfik to Geneffee ===
Headquarters at Suez
30th Indian Brigade

24th Punjabis
76th Punjabis
126th Baluchistan Infantry
2/7th Gurkha Rifles

one squadron of Imperial Service Cavalry
one company from the Bikaner Camel Corps
half company of Sappers and Miners
one battery from the Royal Field Artillery (Territorial)
one Indian field ambulance

=== Sector II: Deversoir to El Ferdan ===
Headquarters at Ismailia Old Camp
22nd (Lucknow) Brigade

62nd Punjabis
92nd Punjabis
2/10th Gurkha Rifles

28th Indian Brigade

51st Sikhs
53rd Sikhs
56th Punjabis
1/5th Gurkha Rifles

one squadron Imperial Service Cavalry
the Bikaner Camel Corps (less three and a half companies)
a machine gun section from the Egyptian Camel Transport Corps
one battery from the Royal Field Artillery (Territorial)
one battery from the Indian Mountain Artillery
two Indian field ambulances

=== Sector III: El Ferdan to Port Said ===
Headquarters El-Qantarah
29th Indian Brigade

14th Sikhs
69th Punjabis
89th Punjabis
1/6th Gurkha Rifles

one battalion from the 22nd (Lucknow) Brigade
one squadron from the Imperial Service Cavalry
two companies from the Bikaner Camel Corps
half company of sappers and miners
two batteries from the Royal Field Artillery (Territorial)
26th Battery, Indian Mountain Artillery
armoured train with a half company of Indian infantry
wireless section (Territorial)
Indian field ambulance
Detachment Royal Army Medical Corps (Territorial)

== April 1915 ==
During April the 29th Indian Brigade and the East Lancashire Division were sent to Gallipoli. The 2nd Mounted (Yeomanry) Division arrived to take their place by 29 April.

Sent to Gallipoli as part of the Mediterranean Expeditionary Force

Australian and New Zealand Army Corps
42nd (East Lancashire) Infantry Division
one Indian brigade (incomplete)

Sent to Basra

one Indian brigade

Sent to Aden (to defend Yemen against a possible attack)

Aden Brigade

== 9 July 1915 ==
The total force of 69,765 personnel consisted of:

one Yeomanry brigade: 1,054 personnel
2nd Mounted Division: 8,242 personnel
Indian Expeditionary Force "E" (under orders for Aden): 15,940 personnel
5th, 6th, 7th Australian Brigades in process of arriving: 5,212 personnel
ANZAC: 10,243 personnel
29th Divisional Supply Column: 312 personnel
regulars, details, depot: 829 personnel
Mediterranean Expeditionary Force base: 28,134 personnel

By November 1915, the Force in Egypt had been reduced largely to a training and reinforcement camp. Although there were 60,000 troops in Egypt, these were mainly details of formations fighting at Gallipoli and ANZACs in training.

== November 1915 ==
Western Frontier Force (Major General A. Wallace)

Composite mounted brigade

Three composite regiments of Yeomanry
One composite regiment of Australian Light Horse

1/1st Nottinghamshire Royal Horse Artillery
Composite infantry brigade

Three territorial battalions.
One battalion Indian infantry (15th Sikhs).

Some South African troops and a New Zealand battalion were added after November 1915.

On 10 March 1916, the Force in Egypt was merged with the Mediterranean Expeditionary Force to form the Egyptian Expeditionary Force.
