= 20th Indian Brigade =

Garhwal Brigade 20th (Garhwal) Brigade 20th Indian Brigade
- Active: 26 November 1902 – 1920
- Country: British India
- Allegiance: British Crown
- Branch: British Indian Army
- Type: Infantry
- Size: Brigade
- Part of: 7th (Meerut) Division; 10th Indian Division; Independent
- Peacetime HQ: Lansdowne
- Engagements: First World War Western Front Battle of La Bassée Battle of Neuve Chapelle Battle of Aubers Battle of Festubert Battle of Loos Sinai and Palestine Campaign Second Transjordan attack Third Transjordan attack Second Battle of Amman

Commanders
- Notable commanders: Maj.-Gen. C.L. Woollcombe; Maj.-Gen. H.D’U. Keary; Br.-Gen. C.G. Blackader

The Garhwal Brigade was an infantry brigade of the British Indian Army formed in 1902 as a result of the Kitchener Reforms. It was mobilized as 20th (Garhwal) Brigade at the outbreak of the First World War as part of the 7th (Meerut) Division and departed for France. It served on the Western Front until November 1915. It then moved to Egypt where it joined the 10th Indian Division, by now designated as 20th Indian Brigade. (Note: The brigade is sometimes mistakenly referred to as 20th Imperial Service Brigade due to the fact that it included three Imperial Service Troops battalions during the Sinai and Palestine Campaign. There is no evidence that this was the official title. All three battalions had previously served with 32nd (Imperial Service) Brigade.) It left the division in March 1916 and thereafter served as an independent brigade in the Sinai and Palestine Campaign. It was broken up in 1920.

== History ==
The Kitchener Reforms, carried out during Lord Kitchener's tenure as Commander-in-Chief, India (1902–1909), completed the unification of the three former Presidency armies, the Punjab Frontier Force, the Hyderabad Contingent and other local forces into one Indian Army. Kitchener identified the Indian Army's main task as the defence of the North-West Frontier against foreign aggression (particularly Russian expansion into Afghanistan) with internal security relegated to a secondary role. The Army was organized into divisions and brigades that would act as field formations but also included internal security troops.

The Garhwal Brigade was formed in November 1902 (Note: 26 November 1902 was the appointment date of the first commanding officer of the brigade.) as a result of the Kitchener Reforms. The brigade formed part of the 7th (Meerut) Division.

=== Western Front ===
At the outbreak of the First World War, the Garhwal Brigade was still part of the 7th (Meerut) Division. It was mobilized with the division in August 1914 as the 20th (Garhwal) Brigade and sailed from Bombay on 20 September for the Western Front. It arrived in Marseille on 12–14 October and moved up to the Front, entering the line on the night of 30/31 October – taking part in the Battle of La Bassée (10 October – 2 November). While in France, the brigade was known by its geographical rather than numerical designation so as to avoid confusion with the British 20th Brigade also serving on the Western Front at the same time. The brigade served with the division as part of the Indian Corps on the Western Front until the end of 1915.

For the rest of 1914, the brigade took part in the Defence of Festubert (23–24 November) and the Defence of Givenchy (20–21 December). In the former, Naik Darwan Singh Negi of the 1st Battalion, 39th Garhwal Rifles won the Victoria Cross (VC), the highest and most prestigious award for gallantry in the face of the enemy that can be awarded to British and Commonwealth forces. Indian troops only became eligible for the award in 1911. His award was gazetted on the same date as that of Sepoy Khudadad Khan, the first Indian VC winner.

In 1915, the brigade took part in the Battle of Neuve Chapelle (10–13 March) where another two VCs were won: Rifleman Gabar Singh Negi (posthumous) of the 2nd Battalion, 39th Garhwal Rifles, and Private William Buckingham of the 2nd Battalion, Leicestershire Regiment. The brigade then took part in the battles of Aubers (9 May), Festubert (15–25 May) and Loos (25 September – 8 October) where Rifleman Kulbir Thapa of the 2nd Battalion, 3rd Queen Alexandra's Own Gurkha Rifles won the brigade's fourth VC.

The losses suffered by the Indian Corps could not be adequately replaced as the reserve and replacement system essentially broke down. Consequently, on 31 October 1915 orders were received to transfer the 3rd (Lahore) and 7th (Meerut) Divisions to Mesopotamia. The last elements were relieved by 9 November and departed for Egypt en route to Mesopotamia. While in Egypt, the brigade left 7th (Meerut) Division in December 1915 and was replaced by 28th Indian Brigade.

=== Egypt and Palestine ===
The 10th Indian Division was re-formed on 7 January 1916 as part of the Suez Canal Defences with units and formations in Egypt: the 20th (Garwhal) Brigade – by now designated as 20th Indian Brigade – joined the division along with the 29th Indian Brigade returned from Gallipoli and 31st Indian Brigade formerly with 11th Indian Division. The new division was short lived: it was broken up again on 7 March 1916 as the need to reform depleted units from France made this plan unrealistic. The brigade became an independent formation and served as such for the rest of the war in the Sinai and Palestine Campaign.

The brigade continued to serve on the Suez Canal Defences under command of the Egyptian Expeditionary Force in 1916 and 1917. In April 1918, it was attached to the Desert Mounted Corps and with it took part in the Second Transjordan attack (30 April – 4 May 1918). Two battalions of the brigade – Alwar Infantry (I.S.) and 1st Battalion, Patiala Infantry (I.S.) – were involved in the Battle of Abu Tulul on 15 July. It then helped to occupy the Jordan Valley. In August 1918, the brigade joined Chaytor's Force along with the Anzac Mounted Division and other units under the command of Major-General E.W.C. Chaytor. As part of the Final Offensive in Palestine, the Force operated in the Jordan Valley and hills to the east of the Jordan. It took part in the Third Transjordan attack (19–25 September) leading to the capture of Amman (25 September).

The brigade was broken up in 1920.

== Orders of battle ==
Garhwal Brigade in India in August 1914
At the outbreak of the First World War, the brigade had the following composition:
- 1st Battalion, 39th Garhwal Rifles
- 2nd Battalion, 39th Garhwal Rifles
- 2nd Battalion, 3rd Queen Alexandra's Own Gurkha Rifles
- 2nd Battalion, 8th Gurkha Rifles (transferred in September 1914 to 21st (Bareilly) Brigade)

20th (Garhwal) Brigade, 7th (Meerut) Division on the Western Front
The brigade's composition on the Western Front included:
- 2nd Battalion, Leicestershire Regiment (joined in September 1914 from 21st (Bareilly) Brigade; transferred on 17 November 1915 to 28th Indian Brigade in Egypt)
- 1st Battalion, 39th Garhwal Rifles (until April 1915) (Note: In April 1915, the 1st and 2nd Battalions of the 39th Garhwal Rifles were amalgamated as 39th Garhwal Rifles.)
- 2nd Battalion, 39th Garhwal Rifles (until April 1915)
- 39th Garhwal Rifles (from April 1915)
- 2nd Battalion, 3rd Queen Alexandra's Own Gurkha Rifles
- 1/3rd Battalion, London Regiment (joined on 10 February 1915 from Malta; joined 139th (Nottinghamshire and Derbyshire) Brigade, 46th (North Midland) Division on 4 November 1915)
- 2nd Battalion, 8th Gurkha Rifles (rejoined in March 1915 from 7th (Ferozepore) Brigade, 3rd (Lahore) Division; left the brigade in Egypt in December 1915 and in March 1916 to Lansdowne, 7th Meerut Divisional Area)

The following Indian units temporarily replaced British ones during July and August 1915:

- 15th Ludhiana Sikhs
- 1st Battalion, 1st King George's Own Gurkha Rifles (The Malaun Regiment)
- 1st Battalion, 4th Gurkha Rifles

20th Indian Brigade, 10th Indian Division in Egypt
The brigade had the following composition while assigned to the 10th Indian Division in Egypt:
- 39th Garhwal Rifles (left in February 1916 for Dehra Dun Brigade, 7th Meerut Divisional Area)
- 2nd Battalion, 3rd Queen Alexandra's Own Gurkha Rifles
- 2nd Battalion, 2nd King Edward's Own Gurkha Rifles (The Sirmoor Rifles) (joined in November 1915 from 19th (Dehra Dun) Brigade, 7th (Meerut) Division; left in February 1916 for Dehra Dun Brigade, 7th Meerut Divisional Area)
- 4th Battalion, Gwalior Infantry (I.S.) (joined in January 1916 from 32nd (Imperial Service) Brigade)
- Alwar Infantry (I.S.) (joined in February 1916 from 32nd (Imperial Service) Brigade, via Lines of Communication)

20th Indian Brigade as an independent formation
The brigade had the following composition while acting as an independent formation in the Sinai and Palestine Campaign:
- 2nd Battalion, 3rd Queen Alexandra's Own Gurkha Rifles (left in December 1916 for 29th Indian Brigade)
- 4th Battalion, Gwalior Infantry (I.S.)
- Alwar Infantry (I.S.) (Note: The Alwar Infantry (I.S.) was redesignated as the 145th (Alwar) Infantry from August to December 1918.)
- 58th Vaughan's Rifles (Frontier Force) (joined in February 1916 from 31st Indian Brigade; left in April 1917 for 49th Indian Brigade)
- 1st Battalion, Patiala Infantry (I.S.) (joined in December 1916 from 29th Indian Brigade)
- 1st Battalion, 101st Grenadiers (joined on 18 January 1918 from 49th Indian Brigade; left on 30 April 1918 for 29th Brigade, British 10th Division)
- 2nd Battalion, 101st Grenadiers (joined on 19 January 1918 from 49th Indian Brigade; left on 1 May 1918 for 31st Brigade, British 10th Division)
- 110th Mahratta Light Infantry (joined on 20 July 1918 from 160th Brigade, British 53rd Division) (Note: The original 110th Mahratta Light Infantry was captured in April 1916 with the 6th (Poona) Division in the fall of Kut. It was reformed from 2nd Mahratta Reserve Battalion in India in June 1917.)

The brigade had the following units attached from August to November 1918:

- 38th (Service) Battalion, Royal Fusiliers (City of London Regiment) (Note: The 38th and 39th battalions of the Royal Fusiliers (City of London Regiment) were formed from Jewish volunteers.)
- 39th (Service) Battalion, Royal Fusiliers (City of London Regiment)
- 1st Battalion, British West Indies Regiment
- 2nd Battalion, British West Indies Regiment

== Commanders ==
The Garhwal Brigade / 20th (Garhwal) Brigade / 20th Indian Brigade had the following commanders:

From	Rank	Name	Notes
26 November 1902 (Note: Mackie says the brigade was formed in 1904.)	Major-General	A.G.F. Browne	
18 October 1907	Major-General	C.L. Woollcombe	
14 November 1911	Major-General	H.D’U. Keary	
8 January 1915	Brigadier-General	C.G. Blackader	Appointment vacated on 30 November 1915
November 1915 (Note: Perry does not show the appointment of H.V. Cox or F.A. Smith.)	Major-General	Sir H.V. Cox	
December 1915	Brigadier-General	F.A. Smith	
3 January 1916	Brigadier-General	H.D. Watson	
17 January 1918	Brigadier-General	E.R.B. Murray	Until January 1919

== See also ==
- Garhwal Brigade formed in India to replace the original brigade when it was mobilized
- Indian Expeditionary Force A

== Bibliography ==
- Becke, Archibald F. (1945). Order of Battle of Divisions Part 4. The Army Council, G.H.Q.s, Armies and Corps, 1914-1919. London: HMSO. OCLC 4405016.
- Haythornthwaite, Philip J. (1996). The World War One Source Book. London: Arms and Armour Press. ISBN 1-85409-351-7.
- James, Brigadier E.A. (1978). British Regiments 1914–18. London: Samson Books Limited. ISBN 0-906304-03-2.
- Mackie, Colin (June 2015). "Army Commands 1900-2011" (PDF). www.gulabin.com. Archived from the original (PDF) on 5 July 2015.
- Perry, F.W. (1993). Order of Battle of Divisions Part 5B. Indian Army Divisions. Newport: Ray Westlake Military Books. ISBN 1-871167-23-X.
