= 32nd (Imperial Service) Brigade =

- Active: October 1914 – January 1916
- Country: British India
- Allegiance: British Crown
- Branch: British Indian Army
- Type: Infantry
- Size: Brigade
- Part of: 11th Indian Division
- Engagements: First World War Sinai and Palestine Campaign Actions on the Suez Canal

The 32nd (Imperial Service) Brigade was an infantry brigade of the British Indian Army that saw active service with the Indian Army during the First World War. It served in Egypt in 1915 before being broken up in January 1916.

== History ==
The 32nd (Imperial Service) Brigade was formed in October 1914, mostly from Imperial Service Troops (forces raised by the princely states of the British Indian Empire), hence its name. It joined the 11th Indian Division when it was formed in Egypt on 24 December and served on the Suez Canal Defences. After the defeat of the Turkish attempts to cross the canal on 3–4 February 1915, the division acted as a relieving depot for the divisions in France. (Note: The infantry divisions in France were the 3rd (Lahore) and 7th (Meerut).) It was broken up on 31 May 1915 and the brigade came under direct command of the Suez Canal Defences. The brigade was broken up in January 1916.

== Order of battle ==
The brigade commanded the following units in the First World War:

- 33rd Punjabis (joined from Bannu Brigade; transferred to 21st (Bareilly) Brigade, 7th (Meerut) Division in August 1915)
- Alwar Infantry (I.S.) (transferred to Lines of Communications in January 1916, then to 10th Indian Division)
- 4th Battalion, Gwalior Infantry (I.S.) (transferred to 20th Indian Brigade, 10th Indian Division in January 1916)
- 1st Battalion, Patiala Infantry (I.S.) (transferred to 22nd (Lucknow) Brigade, 11th Indian Division on 16 September 1915)
- 125th Napier's Rifles (joined from 22nd (Lucknow) Brigade, 11th Indian Division on 16 September 1915; transferred to 19th (Dehra Dun) Brigade, 7th (Meerut) Division in January 1916)

== Commander ==
The brigade was commanded throughout its existence in the First World War by Brigadier-General H.D. Watson.

== See also ==
- Force in Egypt

== Bibliography ==
- Perry, F.W. (1993). Order of Battle of Divisions Part 5B. Indian Army Divisions. Newport: Ray Westlake Military Books. ISBN 1-871167-23-X.
