= The Loyal Purbiah Regiment =

17th Infantry (The Loyal Regiment)
- Active: 1858-1922
- Country: Indian Empire
- Branch: Army
- Type: Infantry
- Part of: Bengal Army (to 1895); Bengal Command
- Uniform: Red; faced white
- Engagements: 1878–80 Afghanistan; 1885 Suakin; Tofrek

Commanders
- Colonel-in-Chief: Edward VII (1904)

The 17th Infantry (The Loyal Regiment) was an infantry regiment of the Bengal Army, later of the united British Indian Army. It was formed at Phillour in 1858 by Major J. C. Innes from men of the 3rd, 36th and 61st Bengal Native Infantry regiments who remained loyal to the British East India Company during the Indian Mutiny, and designated The Loyal Purbiah Regiment.

These men were designated as Purbiyas, Purbiah, or Poorbeah meaning Easterners and were recruited from the region stretching from Agra to Bihar.

It was subsequently re-designated as follows:-

- 17th Regiment of Bengal Native Infantry – 1861
- 17th (The Loyal Purbiah) Regiment of Bengal Native Infantry – 1864
- 17th (The Loyal Purbiah) Regiment of Bengal Infantry –1885
- 17th (The Loyal Regiment) of Bengal Infantry – 1898
- 17th Musalman Rajput Infantry (The Loyal Regiment) – 1902

Its final designation came in 1903 with the Kitchener reforms of the Indian Army.

The regiment took part in the Second Anglo-Afghan War, the Battle of Tofrek the siege of Suakin in the Sudan Campaign and World War I. During World War I they were part of the 22nd (Lucknow) Brigade, first attached to the 8th Lucknow Division in India on internal security duties the brigade was then transferred to Egypt as part of the 11th Indian Division.

After World War I the infantry of the Indian Army was restructured by the mass amalgamation of single battalion units into a smaller number of multi-battalion regiments. The 17th Infantry was one of nine regiments disbanded in 1922, as a result of this reform.
