= Cyril Harbord =

British Army general (1873–1958)

Brigadier-General Cyril Harbord CB CMG DSO
- Born: 2 December 1873; Alverstoke, Hampshire
- Died: 28 September 1958 (aged 84)
- Military career
- Allegiance: United Kingdom
- Branch: British Indian Army
- Service years: 1892–1929
- Rank: Brigadier-General
- Units: 30th Lancers (Gordon's Horse); 29th Lancers (Deccan Horse)
- Commands: 15th (Imperial Service) Cavalry Brigade; 2nd Indian Cavalry Brigade
- Conflicts: Second Boer War; Dervish War; First World War; Western Front; Sinai and Palestine campaign
- Awards: Companion of the Order of the Bath; Companion of the Order of St Michael and St George; Distinguished Service Order; Mentioned in Despatches; Commander of the Order of the Nile (Egypt)

Brigadier-General Cyril Rodney Harbord, CB, CMG, DSO (2 December 1873 – 28 September 1958) was a cavalry officer in the British Indian Army, where he served in the 30th Lancers (Gordon's Horse).

Harbord saw active service in the Second Boer War, the Dervish war expeditions and the First World War, and rose in rank to command the 15th (Imperial Service) and the 2nd Indian Cavalry Brigades.

== Background ==
Cyril Rodney Harbord was born on 2 December 1873, to Charles Hodgson and Rosalie Harriet Harbord. He was educated at Bedford School, graduated from the Royal Military College, Sandhurst as a Queen's Cadet, and joined the Indian Army as a second-lieutenant on 3 September 1892.

== Military career ==
Harbord was promoted to lieutenant on 3 December 1894, to captain 26 November 1901, and to major 18 October 1910.

He was commissioned in the Imperial Yeomanry and saw active service with the 3rd Battalion in the Second Boer War, for which he was mentioned in despatches, awarded Queen's South Africa Medal with three clasps and the King's South Africa Medal with two clasps. He left Cape Town in April 1902, arrived at Southampton the following month, and relinquished his commission with the Imperial Yeomanry in August 1902. Following his return, he served with the 29th Lancers (Deccan Horse) and as a special service officer on the staff of the Somaliland Field Force in 1904.

This was followed by service in the First World War. On the Western Front and in the Sinai and Palestine campaign. On 16 April 1917, he was promoted to temporary brigadier-general and given commanded of the 15th (Imperial Service) Cavalry Brigade. While in command of the brigade he was made a Companion of the Distinguished Service Order in April 1918, and appointed a Companion of the Order of St Michael and St George in May 1919.

For his service in the war he was awarded, by the Sultan of Egypt, the Order of the Nile third class in November 1919. Having reverted to his peace time rank after the war, in December 1926 he was a colonel and commander of the 2nd Indian Cavalry Brigade at Sialkot in India, when he was appointed a Companion of the Order of the Bath.

Harbord retired from the army in 1929 and died 28 September 1958.

== Family ==
Harbord was married to Kathleen Mary Cocks (née Fox), with whom he had four children. One son, James Dennis Harbord, was killed in action during the Second World War.
