= 49th Indian Brigade =

- Active: 15 March 1917 – 20 January 1918
- Country: British India
- Allegiance: British Crown
- Branch: British Indian Army
- Type: Infantry
- Size: Brigade
- Part of: Independent
- Engagements: First World War Sinai and Palestine Campaign

The 49th Indian Brigade was an infantry brigade of the British Indian Army that saw active service with the Indian Army during the First World War. It served as an independent formation in the Sinai and Palestine Campaign but was broken up early in 1918.

== History ==
The 49th Indian Brigade was formed in March 1917 by the Egyptian Expeditionary Force. It served in the Sinai and Palestine Campaign as an independent formation. It did not take part in any significant battles and was broken up in January 1918.

== Order of battle ==
The brigade had the following composition in the First World War:

- 58th Vaughan's Rifles (Frontier Force) (joined in April 1917 from 20th Indian Brigade; transferred to 234th Brigade, British 75th Division on 16 September 1917)
- 1st Battalion, 101st Grenadiers (joined on 10 April 1917 from 29th Indian Brigade; transferred to 20th Indian Brigade on 18 January 1918)
- 2nd Battalion, 101st Grenadiers (joined on 10 April 1917 from 29th Indian Brigade; transferred to 20th Indian Brigade on 19 January 1918)

== Commander ==
The brigade was commanded throughout its existence by Brigadier-General E.R.B. Murray.

== Bibliography ==
- Perry, F.W. (1993). Order of Battle of Divisions Part 5B. Indian Army Divisions. Newport: Ray Westlake Military Books. ISBN 1-871167-23-X.
