= 15th (Imperial Service) Cavalry Brigade =

World War I military force from India

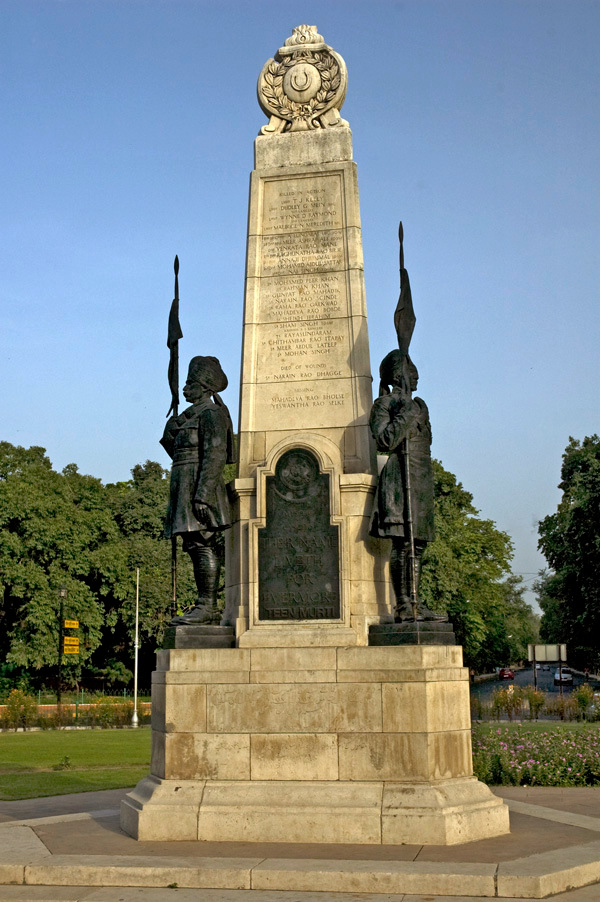
- Memorial to the Imperial Service Cavalry Brigade, at Teen Murti Haifa Chowk in New Delhi.
- Active: October 1914 – January 1920
- Country: British India
- Allegiance: British Crown; Princely States
- Branch: Imperial Service Troops
- Type: Cavalry
- Size: Brigade (~ 1,700 men)
- Part of: Egyptian Expeditionary Force; Imperial Mounted Division; XXI Corps; Australian Mounted Division; Desert Mounted Corps; 2nd Mounted (later 5th Cavalry Division)
- Engagements: World War I: Suez; Gaza; Jordan Valley; Abu Tellul; Megiddo; Haifa; Haritan

Commanders
- Notable commanders: William A. Watson; Cyril R. Harbord

Insignia
- Abbreviation: ISCB

The 15th (Imperial Service) Cavalry Brigade was a brigade-sized formation that served alongside British Empire forces in the Sinai and Palestine campaign, during World War I. Originally called the Imperial Service Cavalry Brigade it was formed from Imperial Service Troops provided by the Indian princely states of Jodhpur, Hyderabad, Mysore, and Patiala which each provided a regiment of lancers. A maximum of three regiments served in the brigade at any one time. The states of Kashmir, Idar and Kathiawar provided smaller detachments for the brigade, which was at times reinforced by other British Empire regiments and artillery batteries when on operations.

In October 1914, the Imperial Service Cavalry Brigade was moved by sea to Egypt to become part of the Force in Egypt defending the Suez Canal. In the first three years of the war, the soldiers were involved in several small-scale battles connected to the Raid on the Suez Canal, but spent most of their time patrolling in the Sinai Desert and along the west bank of the canal. It was not until November 1917 as part of the Egyptian Expeditionary Force that the Imperial Service Cavalry Brigade was involved in the Third Battle of Gaza. The following year the brigade joined the 5th Cavalry Division when it became the 15th (Imperial Service) Cavalry Brigade and played an active role in the British victory over Turkish forces in Palestine.

In total, eighty-four men from the brigade were killed in action or died of their wounds and another 123 were wounded. Several memorials were erected to commemorate the brigade in the Middle East and in India. The anniversary of the brigade's most famous victory, the Battle of Haifa, is still celebrated today by its successors in the Indian Army.

== Background ==
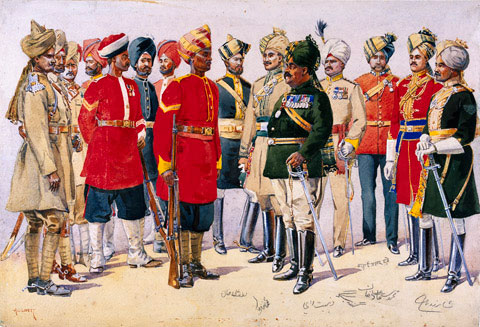
Imperial Service Troops circa 1908

In 1888, the Indian Government proposed that the independent armies of the Indian Princely states provide the British Empire with troops for service on the North West Frontier and outside the Indian subcontinent. The states' forces were recognised by the Indian Government and the British Indian Army as allies, and their troops were subject to the Indian Army Act when serving alongside the Indian Army. When in the field, the commander of the British Forces alongside which any Imperial Service Troops were serving was recognised as the higher legal authority in accordance with the act. To eliminate supply problems, states' armies' field uniform and weapons were the same as the regular Indian Army, and the Indian Government appointed a staff of officers designated Military Advisers and Assistant Military Advisers to assist the independent states' rulers in the training and organisation of their forces. Imperial Service Troops were commanded by Indian officers. In contrast, British Indian Army units had British officers in all senior command posts; their own Indian Viceroy's commissioned officers were trained to only a troop or platoon level of command.

The Imperial Service Troops included cavalry, infantry, artillery, sappers and transport regiments or battalions, with several states contributing both men and equipment. The first states to provide troops for active service were Gwalior and Jaipur for the Chitral Expedition in 1895. Hyderabad sent troops to Burma in 1898 and to the Second Anglo-Boer War in 1902. During the 1900 Boxer Rebellion in China, part of the British relief force contingent was an Imperial Service Brigade, raised from the troops of Alwar, Bikaner and Jodhpur. Bikaner also sent troops to serve in the 1901 Somaliland Campaign. By the start of the First World War, the princely states together provided fifteen cavalry regiments, thirteen infantry battalions, seven transport units, four companies of sappers, three camel corps regiments and two batteries of mountain artillery, totalling around 22,500 men.

== Brigade organisation ==
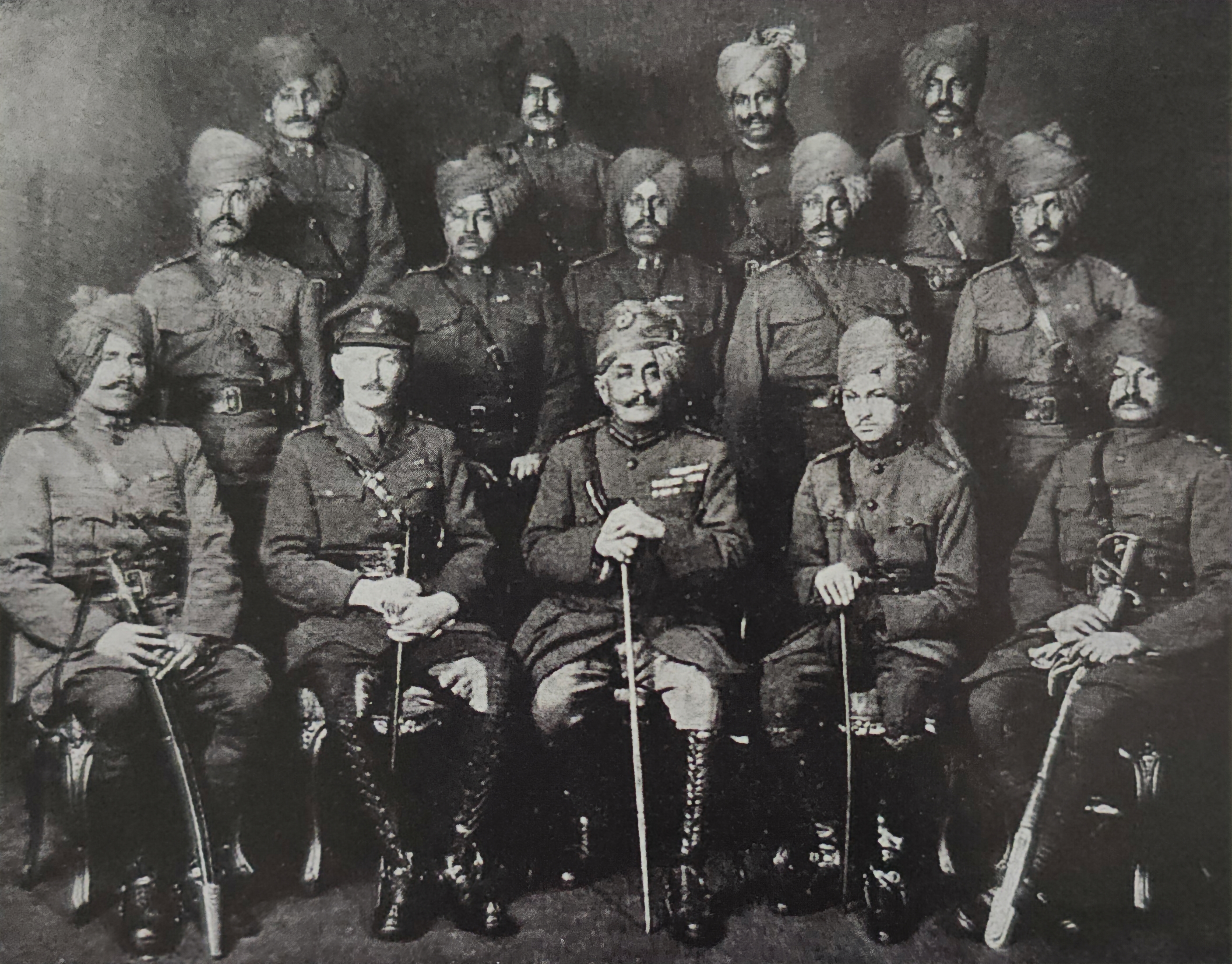
Officers of the Jodhpur Lancers in England

In October 1914, under the command of Brigadier-General William A. Watson of the British Indian Army, the Imperial Service Cavalry Brigade, of around 1,700 men, was gathered at Deolali for service in the First World War. The brigade headquarters had an establishment of seven officers and forty-seven men. Including the brigade commander there were five British officers on the brigade staff; also attached were Sir Pratap Singh the Maharaja of Idar and Captain Zorawar Singh the Commandant of the Bhavnagar Imperial Service Lancers. (Note: Zorwar Singh was one of the first four Indians to receive a commission in the British forces, as opposed to a commission in the British Indian Army.) The Kathiawar Imperial Service Signal Troop, commanded by Captain Henry St. George Scott of the 4th Gurkha Rifles, were with brigade headquarters, with an establishment of one Indian officer and twenty-seven men of other ranks, including twelve despatch riders from Idar State. The brigade also included the 124th Indian Cavalry Field Ambulance, commanded by Captain T. O'Leary of the Indian Army Medical Corps, with an establishment of five Indian officers, one British and ten Indians of other ranks.

The fighting component of the brigade was formed from three cavalry regiments, each of five squadrons: the 1st Hyderabad Lancers commanded by Major Mahomed Azmatullah Bahadur with twenty-seven officers (one British) and 533 other ranks, the Mysore Lancers (including two troops of Bhavnagar Lancers and one troop of Kashmir Lancers) commanded by Regimentdar B. Chamraj Urs Bahadur with thirty-two officers (one British) and 487 other and the Patiala Lancers commanded by Colonel Nand Singh Sardar Bahadur with twenty-six officers and 528 other ranks. This formation remained the same until May 1916, when the Patiala Lancers were transferred to serve in the campaign in Mesopotamia. The brigade regained its own third regiment in May 1918 when the Jodhpur Lancers, commanded by Colonel Thakur Pratap Singh Sardar Bahadur, which had been serving on the Western Front in France, arrived in the theatre. The final unit assigned to the brigade was the Imperial Service Machine-Gun Squadron formed on 10 June 1918 by amalgamating the three cavalry regiment's machine-gun sections into one unit. Some sources refer to the squadron as the 15th Imperial Service Brigade Machine-Gun Squadron.

Even though the brigade was an Imperial Service unit, the cavalry regiments and brigade headquarters included attached British Indian Army Special Service Officers (SSO), but only as advisors. In 1914, the three cavalry regiments had two SSOs attached, and Colonel J. Desaraj Urs Commander-in-Chief of the Mysore State Forces accompanied the Mysore Lancers as an observer. The Jodhpur Lancers joined the brigade with seven SSOs attached. Throughout the war the establishment of British officers assigned to the cavalry regiments was gradually increased; in February 1915 there were four in each regiment, in 1917 another two were assigned and in mid-1918 a full complement of twelve British officers in each of the regiments was reached.

== Service history ==
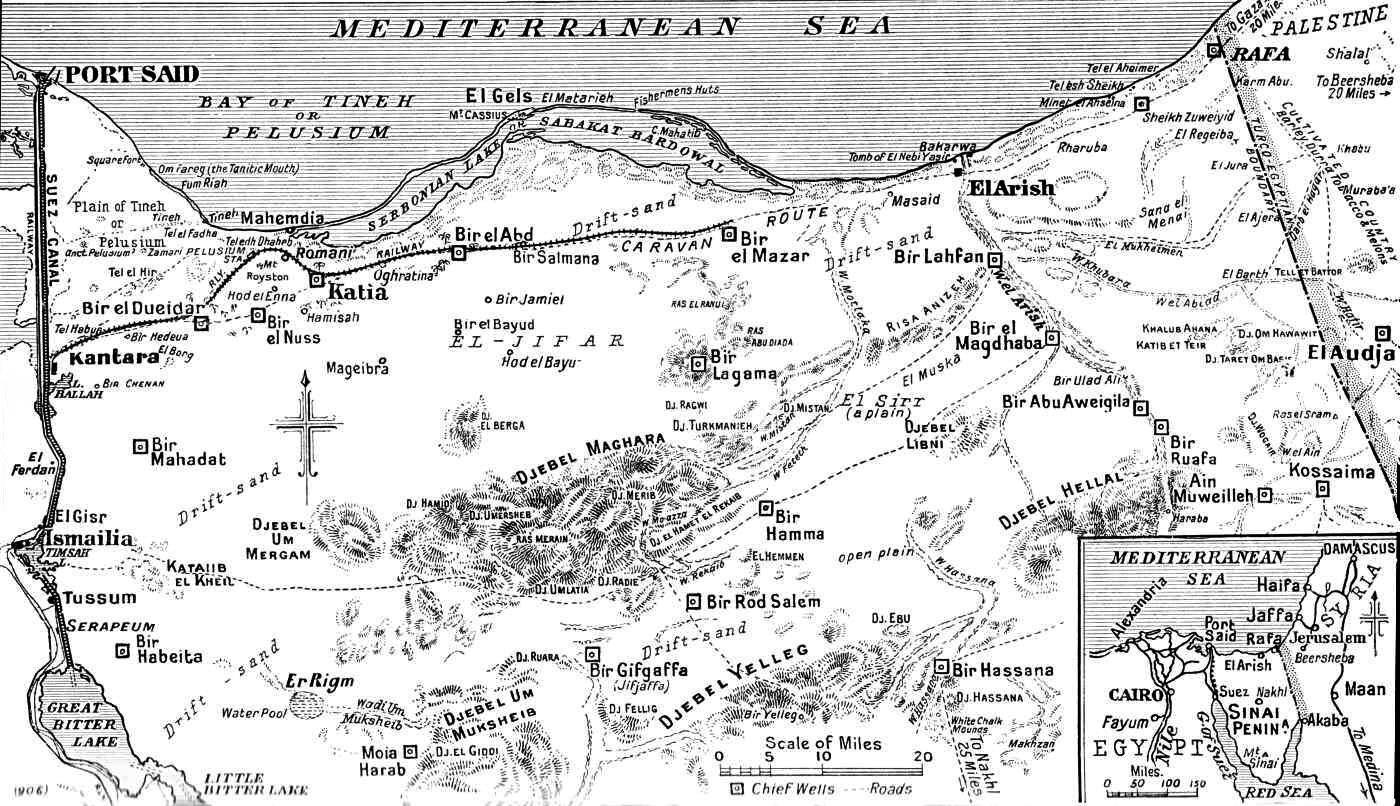
Suez Canal, the Sinai Desert and Southern Palestine

=== 1914 ===
While waiting at Deolali to embark for Egypt, the brigade conducted regimental and brigade training programmes during which all ranks and animals were inspected, and those found unfit for service were returned to their regimental depots. Between 27 and 29 October the brigade moved to Bombay for embarkation; six transport ships carrying most of the brigade sailed on 1 November, while a seventh ship carrying two squadrons of Mysore Lancers remained behind with mechanical problems and finally set sail a fortnight later. The main body of the brigade arrived at Suez on 16 November, travelled by train to Ismailia two days later and started their first war-time patrols along the banks of the Sweet Water Canal. The brigade was not assigned to a higher formation at this time but were Army Troops under command of General Headquarters. The Bikaner Camel Corps, another Imperial Service unit, was attached to the brigade at Ismailia for administrative purposes, but was not operationally attached. To expand the area the brigade could patrol, squadrons were detached to El Kubri, Kantarah and the Ferry Post crossing at Ismailia. At the same time, the brigade became responsible for patrolling the length of the Suez Canal. The other British forces defending the canal were more static infantry formations, comprising the 42nd (East Lancashire), and the 10th and 11th Indian Divisions, the latter included the Imperial Service Infantry Brigade as one of its three brigades. Their Turkish opponents had around 25,000 men in the region, including the 25th Division. (Note: At the time of the First World War, the modern Turkish state did not exist, and instead it was part of the Ottoman Turkish Empire. While the terms have distinct historical meanings, within many English-language sources the term "Turkey" and "Ottoman Empire" are used synonymously, although many academic sources differ in their approaches. The sources used in this article predominately use the term "Turkey". .)

=== 1915 ===
By the end of 1914, no contact had been made with any Turkish forces. In January 1915 the brigade was informed that a large Turkish force had moved into the Sinai. The out-stations were reinforced and the squadron at Kantarah was involved in a small action at Bir El Dueidar, between Kantarah and Katia which was the brigade's first involvement in combat. Towards the end of the month, several small battles occurred until the night of 2/3 February, when Turkish opponents tried to cross the canal in force. The attempt failed and on 4 February the brigade moved into the Sinai with infantry in support. About seven miles (11 km) east of Toussoum they located the Turkish forces, estimated to be between three or four brigades in strength, and captured twenty-five men and ninety camels. By 10 February the Turkish had withdrawn to the east and the canal was no longer in immediate danger, so the brigade returned to the canal and resumed their normal patrolling routine. At the end of February 1915 the Mysore and Hyderabad Lancers were ordered to return to the Sinai and destroy the water sources used by the Turkish during their advance.

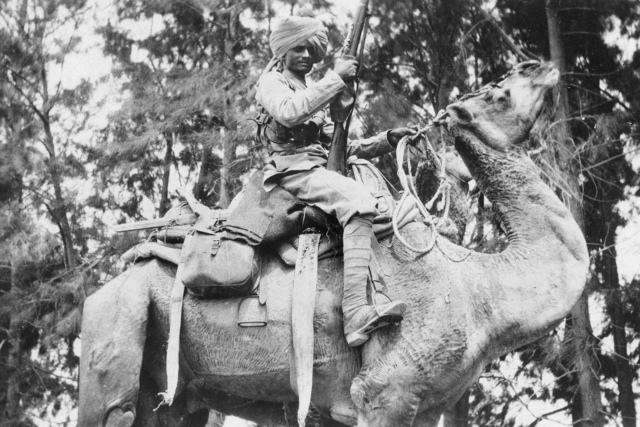
Bikaner Camel Corps soldier

The brigade's next action was on 22 March when two squadrons of Hyderabad Lancers were included in a force sent to assault a Turkish formation of 800 infantry and 200 cavalry supported by artillery, entrenched ten miles (16 km) east of El Kubri. After a short fight the Turkish withdrew; it had been intended that the Lancers would move to cut off their retreat but the soft terrain prevented them getting into position in time. On 7 April, patrols from Kantara reported a force of about 1,200 men had opened fire on them. To counter this new threat to the canal, the whole brigade was moved to Kantarah and the next day advanced into the Sinai, but failed to locate any Turkish troops and returned to Ismailia.

On 28 April a patrol from the Bikaner Camel Corps was attacked by an estimated 400 men with artillery support. In response the brigade crossed the canal that night supported by infantry and Egyptian artillery and advanced on El Hawawish, where the Turkish were believed to be located. By daybreak however their guide reported he was lost, so the brigade continued alone. Bypassing El Hawaish, they made for Bir Mahadat, arriving at midday they discovered the Turkish were withdrawing to the north. Setting off in pursuit they caught up with the Turkish rearguard, which was forced to stop and fight. For the loss of two killed and eight wounded the brigade killed twenty Turkish soldiers and captured thirteen. At 20:00 on 29 April, the pursuit was called off and the brigade returned to Ferry Post on the canal. Several times in the following months the brigade responded to reports of Turkish incursions, but nothing came of them until 23 November when a Mysore Lancers squadron located a Turkish camel force of about sixty men fifteen miles (24 km) east of Kantarah. Pursued by the Lancers, the Turkish withdrew, during which the Lancers killed seven men, captured twelve and wounded several more. Among the dead was the Bedouin leader Rizkalla Salim who had led most of the Turkish raids on the canal, and with his death the attacks ceased.

=== 1916–1917 ===
From January 1916, all patrolling east of the Suez Canal was left to the British yeomanry and the Australian Light Horse formations. The Imperial Service Cavalry Brigade concentrated on patrolling the Sweet Water Canal, the railway line between Suez and Port Said, and the Suez Canal Zone to the west of the canal, which was a restricted area for non-military personnel. On 31 March, Major-General W.A. Watson assumed command of the Nile Delta region and was replaced as brigade commander by Brigadier-General M.H. Henderson. In May 1916, the brigade was reduced to two cavalry regiments when the Patiala Lancers left for Mesopotamia. The brigade also carried out weapons and signal training, but the year ended without them being involved in any contact with the Turkish.

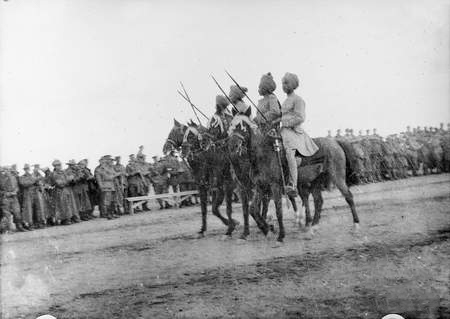
Hyderabad Lancers at Tel el Kebir 1916

In February 1917, the brigade was ordered to relieve the British 6th Mounted Brigade on the east bank of the Suez canal. The Mysore Lancers moved to Gebel-Geneffe, the Hyderabad Lancers to Ayun Musa, with the brigade headquarters at El Shatt. For the next few weeks the brigade sent patrols out into the Sinai until 14 April, when they were ordered to relocate to Kantarah, where two days later Brigadier-General Cyril Rodney Harbord took over command. To help counter an expected Turkish attack in early May, the brigade was ordered to Khan Yunis in Gaza. The brigade marched the 150 miles (240 km) in nine days, arrived on 25 April and came under command of the Imperial Mounted Division. The division was the army reserve under orders to counter-attack the Turkish left flank. The expected attack never came, but instead of moving back to the canal, the brigade became lines of communication troops, based at Khan Yunis and Rafah. For the next three months, the brigade was deployed on rear area security and patrolling duties. In May 1917, the cavalry regiments received the Vickers machine-gun to replace their older Maxim Guns and all ranks were put through training courses on the Vickers and a newer version of the Lee–Enfield Rifle, which had also just been issued. In September, the cavalry regiments' pack horses started to be replaced by horse-drawn wagons and each of the regiments was issued with twelve Hotchkiss machine-guns; one per troop.

==== Third battle of Gaza ====
On 27 September, the brigade was once again moved to the front line and given responsibility for patrolling the area between the Desert Mounted Corps and the XXI Corps, taking under command the XXI Corps Cavalry Regiment on 20 October. At the time the brigade was the only mounted formation not under the direct command of the Desert Mounted Corps, remaining Army Troops. The next British attack was the capture of Gaza in November 1917; the plan was for the infantry to capture their initial objectives, then the brigade would be released to advance along the Mediterranean coastline, turn right and attack the Turkish rear and their headquarters at Nuzzle. When the battle started, the British infantry captured all but one of their objectives, but as the brigade started to move out, a Turkish counter-attack regained their previous positions, so the brigade's advance was called off. However, by the night of 6/7 November, continued British attacks forced the Turkish to withdraw from Gaza and the brigade was ordered forward to pursue them. By 13:00 the brigade was north of Gaza when the Mysore Lancers' leading squadron located the Turkish rearguard, which included a heavy machine-gun position. At 15:00 the Hyderabad Lancers and the XXI Corps Cavalry Regiment attacked Beit Hanun, while the rest of the brigade attacked Beit Lahi. As the Hyderabad Lancers approached their objective, they came under a heavy artillery bombardment. Leaving one squadron and their machine-guns behind to provide fire support, the rest of the Lancers attacked, capturing the Wadi Safieh line. The Lancers, still under artillery fire, held out until 16:30, when they were ordered to withdraw and rejoin the rest of the brigade now concentrated at Beit Lahi.

The brigade now came under command of XXI Corps and at 01:45 on 8 November was ordered to move west of Beit Hanun and link up with the Australian Mounted Division, which was advancing from the east. As they moved to the east of Beit Hanun, the XXI Corps Cavalry Regiment, which was still attached to the brigade, came under heavy machine-gun and artillery fire, preventing the brigade from advancing further. The Turkish bombardment continued until 12:20, when they were observed withdrawing. The XXI Corps Cavalry Regiment and Mysore Lancers were ordered to encircle and cut off their retreat, however dug in Turkish positions at the Wadi Hesi once again halted the brigade advance. At 15:00 that day the brigade eventually made contact with the 4th Light Horse Brigade, completing the link up with the Australian Mounted Division.

The morning of 9 November was spent trying to water the horses, some of which had had no water for over twenty-four hours, so the brigade did not move after the now retreating Turkish until after 11:20. Moving at their best speed, the brigade reached the high ground east of El Medjel by 14:30, capturing two artillery guns, rifles and ammunition en route. Two troops were sent forward to locate the Turkish rearguard, which they found at 16:30 crossing the plain at El Tine. Early the next morning, patrols were again sent to locate the Turkish forces but at 07:00, the brigade was unexpectedly ordered back to Gaza. Despite the heavy fire the brigade had been subjected to, their casualties during the battle were light; only four officers and ten other ranks had been wounded, sixteen horses killed and another fifty wounded. The Turkish casualties were estimated at 100 dead; forty-nine were taken prisoner and five artillery guns were captured.

=== 1918 ===
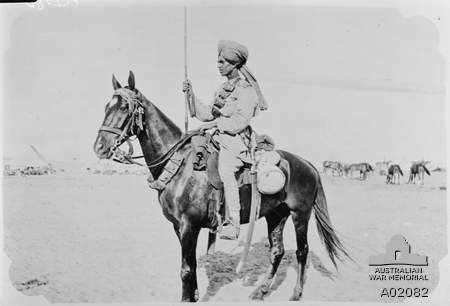
Mysore Lancers sowar and horse; note the method of carrying small arms ammunition in a bandolier on the man and around the horse's neck.

In early January, the brigade trained and re-equipped, which included the first issue of bayonets to the Lancers. On 2 April, the Hyderabad Lancers were detached from the brigade, coming under the command of the ANZAC Mounted Division, then the Desert Mounted Corps and finally the 60th Division. The rest of the brigade moved to the Jordan Valley, arriving at Jericho on 29 April. The next day the brigade was designated the Desert Mounted Corps reserve and concentrated two miles (3.2 km) to the west of the Ghoraniyeh bridgehead over the River Jordan. On the final day of the raid on Es Salt, on 4 May, the brigade, with the New Zealand Wellington Mounted Rifles Regiment attached, was ordered to cross the Jordan and form a defensive screen on the east bank to cover the withdrawal of the ANZAC Division. They remained in place until 5 May, when the ANZAC Division reached and crossed the Jordan safely at 16:00. The brigade, less some patrols, was back within the bridgehead by 18:00. In the following twelve days, the brigade patrolled to the east of the River Jordan, resulting in numerous contacts with the Turkish defenders, during which several prisoners and deserters were captured. On 11 May, the Jodhpur Lancers were assigned to the brigade and the Wellington Mounted Rifles returned to the command of their parent New Zealand Mounted Rifles Brigade. On 23 May, the brigade came under command of the Australian Mounted Division and moved to a position four miles (6.4 km) north of Jericho, remaining with the Australians until 4 June, when they left for Ras Dieran, becoming part of the newly raised 2nd Mounted Division. For almost a month the brigade was involved in training and staff exercises, during which time the brigade machine-gun squadron was formed. On 5 July, the brigade left for the Jordan Valley to resume their place in the front line.

On 14 July, the brigade's squadrons were involved in several small battles in the Hajlah, Henu and Abu Tellul bridgehead area, which included a charge by the Jodhpur Lancers on the Turkish positions followed by a separate charge by a squadron of Mysore Lancers on those retreating from the Jodhpur's action. Accumulatively, the day's fighting resulted in over 100 Turkish dead and seventy prisoners taken, twenty of them wounded, from the 9th and 11th Cavalry Regiments. The brigade's casualties were twenty-five dead, seven wounded and six missing. For their part in the battles the Jodhpur Lancers were mentioned in army despatches. On 24 July, the 2nd Mounted Division was renamed 5th Cavalry Division and the brigade became the 15th (Imperial Service) Cavalry Brigade. In early August, the brigade carried out several patrols, crossing the bridgehead and into the Jordan Valley until 4 August, the Turkish were found to have withdrawn overnight. A small Turkish force returned on 15 August but withdrew before the brigade could move up and engage them. The brigade remained in the area until the night of the 17/18 August, when they were relieved by the 10th Cavalry Brigade from the 4th Cavalry Division.

==== Haifa ====
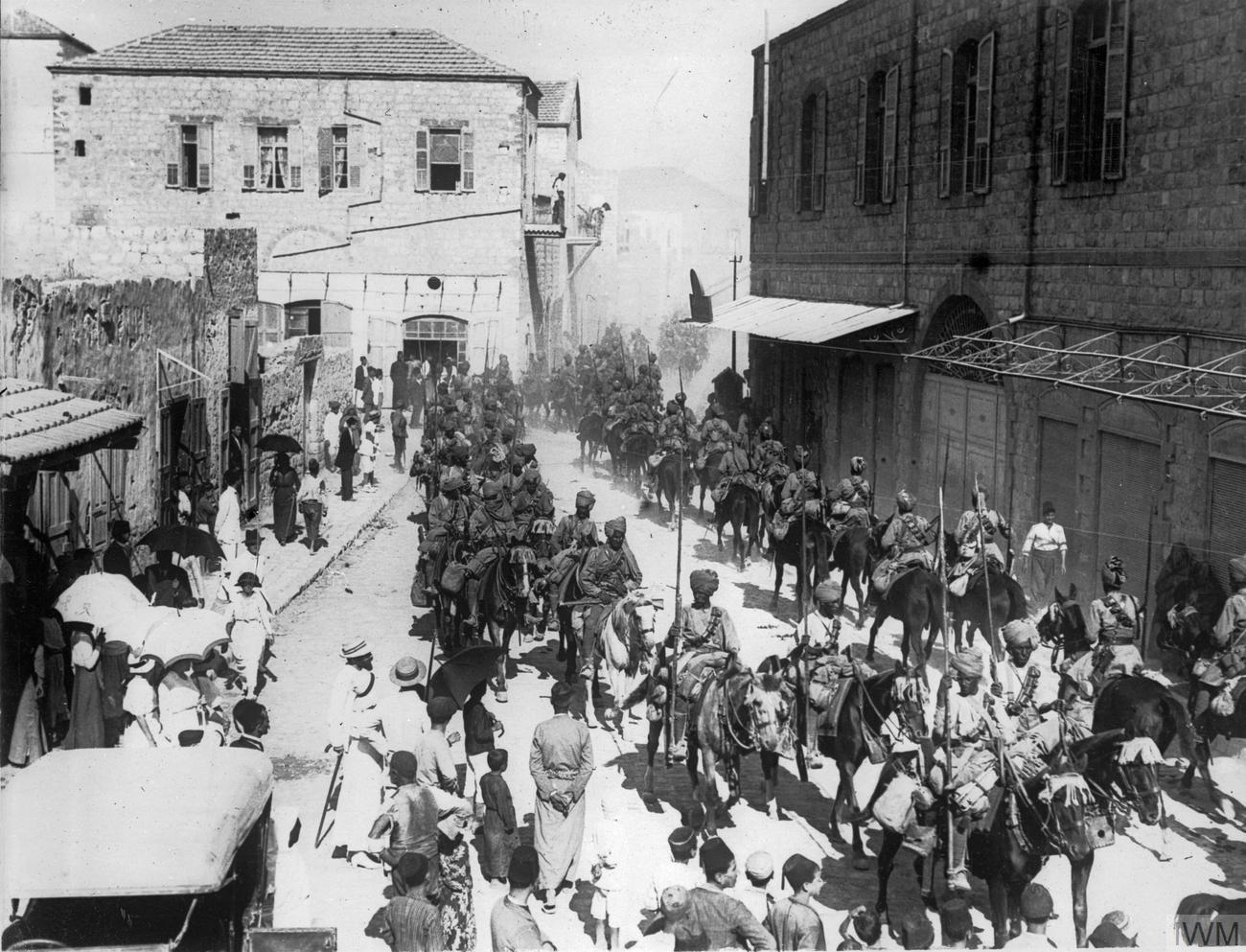
Men from the brigade at Haifa after its capture

The next three weeks were taken up with regimental and brigade training, until 17 September when the brigade started returning to the front line. The Hyderabad Lancers were detached from the brigade on 22 September to escort 12,000 prisoners to Kerkur, and on 23 September, B Battery, Honourable Artillery Company was attached to the brigade for the forthcoming operations. At 03:00 on 23 September, the brigade leading the 5th Cavalry Division left Afule for Haifa and Acre. The advance was unopposed until 10:00 that day when the Mysore Lancers reached the village of Beled Esh Sheikh where the leading squadron was shelled from Mount Carmel and came under small-arms fire from the region of the village. The Turkish had four artillery guns on the heights overlooking the brigade's line of approach and another six to the east of Haifa, supported by machine-gun posts and infantry to the west of the main Haifa road.

The brigade deployed its forces, with one squadron from the Mysore Lancers supported by two machine-guns to capture Mount Carmel. A second Mysore squadron would cover the main road while the remainder of the regiment with two machine-guns would advance along the Acre railway line. The Jodhpur Lancers would deploy in the open and wait further orders, while brigade headquarters and the remainder of the machine-gun squadron and the artillery battery would be to the north of Beled Esh Sheikh. When in position, the Jodhpur Lancers—supported by covering fire from the artillery—and the Mysore Lancers would charge the guns. At 11:45 the Sherwood Rangers Yeomanry caught up with the brigade and one squadron was detached to support the Mysore Lancers on Mount Carmel. The attack was scheduled to start at 14:00 but before that, the artillery battery and reconnaissance patrols sent out to look for the Turkish positions kept up suppressing fire on them, to which the Turkish responded with counter-battery fire. The attack commenced on time; the Jodhpur Lancers advanced in squadron columns in the face of heavy Turkish rifle and machine-gun fire.

The Lancers charged towards the railway line, but the terrain forced them to move to their left into a wadi, which was impassable and forced the Lancers even further left. The leading squadron crossed the railway line, captured the machine-gun positions and cleared the way for the remainder of the regiment to charge into the town. At the same time the regiment's second squadron had moved right, capturing three artillery guns and two machine-guns, while the two remaining squadrons charged through the town virtually unopposed, facing only sporadic rifle fire. As they reached the other side of the town they were soon joined by the two other squadrons which had made their way around the outskirts, capturing another two artillery guns en route. Elsewhere, one of the Mysore Lancers squadrons that had been giving covering fire came under heavy artillery and machine-gun fire from the mouth of the River Nahr el Mukutta. The squadron mounted and charged the Turkish positions, capturing two artillery guns, two machine-guns and 110 prisoners. With the town secure the Mysore squadron on Mount Carmel charged a Turkish position at Karmelheim, capturing a 6-inch naval gun, two mountain artillery guns, two machine-guns and seventy-eight prisoners. During the charge they were joined by a squadron from the Sherwood Rangers Yeomanry, who captured another fifty prisoners. Prisoners taken inside the town were two German officers, twenty-three Turkish officers and 664 other ranks. Two 6-inch naval guns, four 4.2-inch guns, six 77 mm guns, four 10-pound camel guns, ten machine-guns and a large quantity of ammunition were captured in Haifa. The brigade's own casualties were relatively light; one Indian officer and two other ranks were killed, and six Indian officers and twenty-eight other ranks were wounded. Sixty horses were killed and eighty-three were wounded.

==== Advance to Homs ====
The brigade rested for the next two days and was rejoined by the Hyderabad Lancers on 25 September. At 05:00 the next day they resumed the advance, arriving at Lake Tiberias (Sea of Galilee) at 11:00 on 27 September. After watering the horses the brigade advanced again, reaching Kasr Atra at 22:30, where they halted for the night. They were to start again early the next day, but had to wait as the Australian Mounted Division to their right had been stopped by the Turkish forces and at 11:00 the brigade resumed their advance. Because of the delay, they did not reach El Kuneitra until midnight on 28/29 September. The next day the brigade was designated as the Desert Mounted Corps reserve, responsible for guarding their own and the Australian Mounted Division's transport columns. During the day, the two divisions were held up for fourteen hours by a small, well-placed Turkish detachment. On 30 September the brigade was ordered to head for Kiswe to round up Turkish stragglers from the Ottoman Fourth Army. By 09:30 on 1 October, the brigade was two miles (3.2 km) to the north of Kiswe but were then ordered to move to a new position two miles (3.2 km) east of Damascus, where they were to be the division reserve, while the 14th Cavalry Brigade was made responsible for the capture of Kiswe.

The next day, 2 October, was the day that British Empire forces officially entered Damascus. This was marked by a short period of rest for the British forces and the brigade advance did not resume until 05:30 on 5 October. Their first objective was Khan Meizelun then Moallaka which they reached unopposed on 6 October. The next day Lieutenant-Colonel Hyla Holden, a SSO with the Jodhpur Lancers, became the first Allied officer to enter Beirut, the Arab Revolt forces commanded by Sherif Hussein bin Ali arrived that same afternoon and assumed control of the local government. The brigade continued their advance capturing several villages in the following days. Tell Esh Sherif on 11 October, Baalbek on 13 October, Lebwe on 14 October, El Kaa on 15 October, Kusseir on 16 October and Homs was reached at midday 17 October.

==== Haritan ====
At Homs, the brigade rested for two days and on 19 October headed for Er Rastan, with orders to repair a bridge over the River Orontes, which had been destroyed by retreating Turkish forces. The next day, assisted by No. 5 Field Squadron Royal Engineers, was spent repairing the bridge, after which the brigade advanced, reaching Hama on 21 October. The brigade had expected to rest there for several days but were ordered to continue the advance to Aleppo. The brigade was preceded by seven light armoured cars, but the remainder of the division was following a day behind. On 24 October the armoured cars' advance was stopped by Turkish defences near Khan Tuman. The Turkish held a strong defensive line on a ridge line to the south and west of Aleppo. The brigade was ordered to occupy a position on the Aleppo-Alexandretta road and to clear Turkish trenches on the ridge to the west of Aleppo, but when they reached the ridge line on 26 October, the position had been evacuated. Intelligence from locals suggested that a force of 1,000 men with two small artillery guns were heading north out of Aleppo, so the brigade set off in pursuit. At 11:00, the leading two Jodhpur Lancers squadrons and a machine-gun section reached a position overlooking Haritan to the north of Aleppo when they came under Turkish small arms fire. Harbord ordered an immediate brigade attack; the Mysore Lancers would move around to the east of the ridge and charge the village, followed by the other two Jodhpur Lancer squadrons while the remainder of the brigade machine-gun squadron would move onto the ridge to provide covering fire, with the two other Jodhpur squadrons. The armoured cars of No. 12 Light Armoured Motor Battery arrived at 11:30 and were ordered along the main road to support the attack.

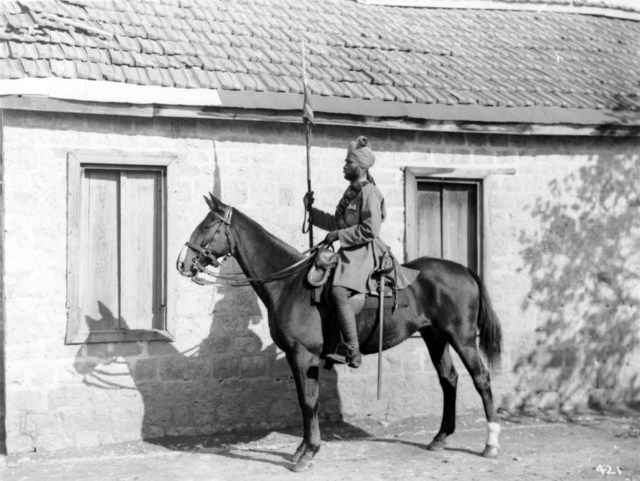
Indian lancer near Aleppo in 1918

As the attack started, the leading armoured car developed a fault and returned to their start position, due to a misunderstanding, the rest of the battery followed them, taking them out of the attack. The Mysore Lancers had also started their advance but moved further east to get into a position to charge after discovering the Turkish line was longer than expected, taking them out of range of their supporting machine-guns. At 12:00 the Lancers charged the Turkish position, killing fifty men and capturing twenty, but without any fire support from their machine-gun squadron they were unable to penetrate the Turkish defences and were forced to withdraw to the rear, dismount and keep the Turkish position under observation. The extent of the Turkish position had not been fully appreciated, and was now estimated to be held by a force of 3,000 infantry, 400 cavalry, up to twelve artillery guns and between thirty and forty machine-guns. One group of Turkish soldiers started towards the Mysore Lancers position, but halted about 800 yards (730 m) short and started to dig new defensive trenches. Unable to progress against the larger force, the brigade kept the position under observation and at 21:00, the Turkish were seen to be withdrawing and had completely evacuated their positions by midnight. At 23:15 the 14th Cavalry Brigade arrived, setting up their own observation lines, until daylight when they took over the 15th Brigade's positions. In the day's battle, Turkish casualties were estimated to be around 100 men, while the brigade lost four British officers, including Holden attached to the Jodhpur Lancers, one Indian officer and sixteen other ranks. Twelve officers, six of them British, and forty-four other ranks were wounded, and three other ranks were reported missing.

That night, the Turkish forces withdrew twenty miles (32 km) to Deir el Jemel to the north-west of Aleppo. The 5th Cavalry Division was not strong enough by itself to continue the advance and halted, waiting for the Australian Mounted Division to catch up with them. On 27 October, the day after their unsuccessful charge, the brigade became the division reserve and was ordered back to Aleppo. Events now overtook them; at noon on 31 October, after the Armistice of Mudros had been agreed the previous day, the war with the Ottoman Empire ended.

== Disbandment ==
After the Armistice of Mudros, the brigade remained with 5th Cavalry Division in Palestine as part of the occupation forces. However, demobilization began immediately and the brigade was broken up by January 1920. Although they did not suffer the same casualties associated with the Western Front in France, its units did not escape without loss. The Mysore Lancers had twenty-three men killed in action, one man died as a result of his wounds, another two were reported missing believed killed, three wounded men were taken prisoner and released at the end of the war, and forty-nine men were wounded. The Hyderabad Lancers had twelve men killed in action, four died as a result of their wounds, seven were reported missing believed killed and forty-three were wounded. The casualties for the Jodhpur Lancers, while serving with the brigade, were seventeen men killed in action, five died as a result of their wounds, five missing believed killed, two were taken prisoner and thirty-one were wounded. The casualties for the Patiala Lancers were not recorded in the brigade history, but the Commonwealth War Graves Commission records that while attached to the brigade from 1914 to May 1916 they had seven dead. For their service, several men of the brigade were given orders or were decorated; the brigade received six Distinguished Service Orders, three Order of the Nile, one Order of the British Empire, six Order of British India, fourteen Military Crosses, two Military Medals, forty-nine Indian Distinguished Service Medals, twelve Indian Order of Merits and sixty-six were mentioned in despatches.

=== Memorials ===
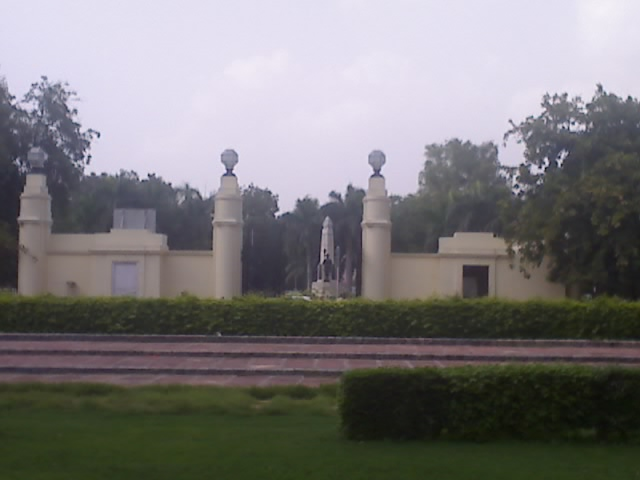
Teen Murti memorial park gate

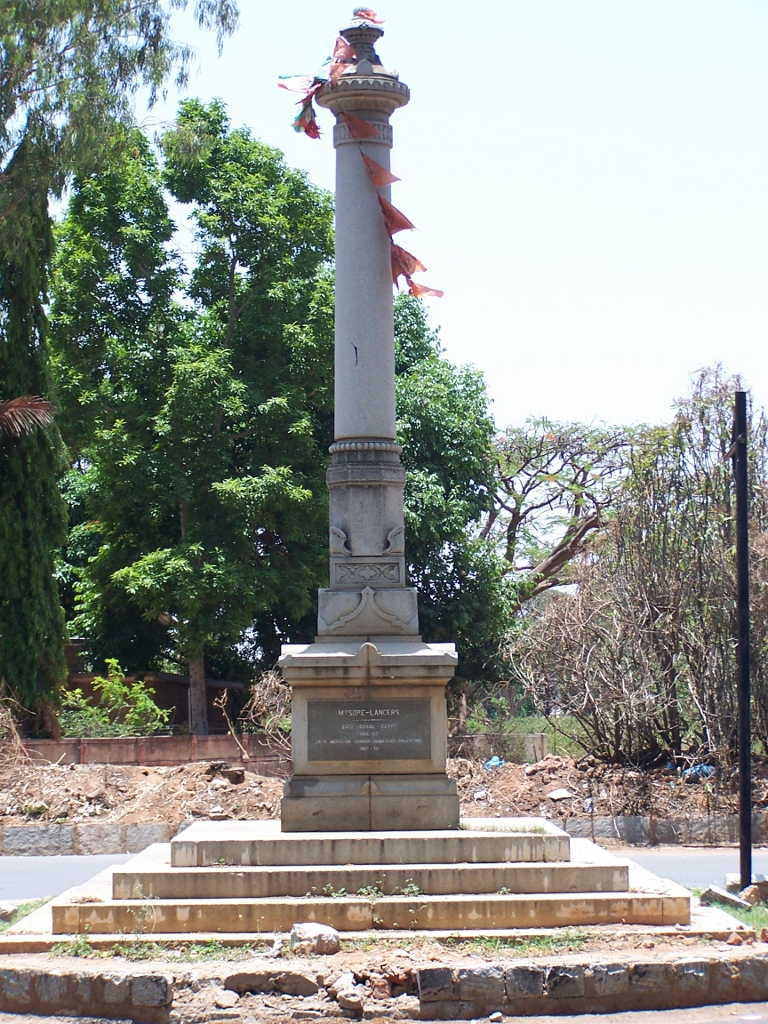
Mysore Lancers Memorial at Bangalore in April 2004

The main memorial to the brigade is the Teen Murti (three soldiers) memorial in New Delhi, a stone and bronze sculpture inscribed with the names of those members of the brigade killed in action. The three statues represent soldiers from the Indian States of Hyderabad, Mysore and Jodhpur. A memorial on the site of the fighting at Haritan is inscribed with the date of the battle, the units involved and details of the casualties. The Port Tewfik Memorial was erected at the Suez Canal to commemorate the 4,000 Indian officers and soldiers killed during the Sinai and Palestine campaign who have no known grave. The brigade's capture of Haifa on 23 September is remembered by the present Indian Army as Haifa Day, and the Mysore and Jodhpur Lancers part in its capture was recognised by the British government, which awarded them the battle honour Megiddo.

The British army commander Edmund Allenby in his despatches also commented on the contribution of the men in the brigade:

"I take this opportunity of expressing my appreciation of the valuable services and high soldierly qualities of the following contingents of Indian Imperial Service Troops which, through the generosity of their respective Ruling Chiefs, were placed at my disposal: — Hyderabad Lancers, Jodhpur Lancers, Kathiawar Signal Troop, Mysore Lancers."

== Formation ==
=== Commanders ===
- Brigadier-General William Arthur Watson (October 1914 – 31 March 1916)
- Brigadier-General M. H. Henderson (31 March 1916 – 16 April 1917)
- Brigadier-General Cyril Rodney Harbord (16 April 1917 – 1920)

=== Units assigned ===
- 1st Hyderabad Lancers (October 1914 – 1918)
- Mysore Lancers (October 1914 – 1918)
- Patiala Lancers (October 1914 – May 1916)
- Jodhpur Lancers (From 11 May 1918)
- 124th Indian Cavalry Field Ambulance (October 1914 – 1918)
- 15th Kathiawar Signal Troop (October 1914 – 1918)
- 15th Imperial Service Machine Gun Squadron (From 10 June 1918)

=== Units attached ===
- Bikaner Camel Corps (for administration only)
- XXI Corps Cavalry Regiment (20 October – 9 November 1917)
- Wellington Mounted Rifle Regiment (4–11 May 1918)
- Sherwood Rangers Yeomanry (23–25 September 1918)
- B Battery Honourable Artillery Company (23–25 September 1918)

== See also ==
- Force in Egypt
- Imperial Service Infantry Brigade
- Hyderabad State Forces

== Bibliography ==
- Field Marshal Carver, Michael (2004). The National Army Museum Book of the Turkish Front 1914–1918: The Campaigns at Gallipoli, in Mesopotamia and in Palestine. Pan Grand Strategy Series. London: Pan Macmillan. ISBN 978-0-330-49108-2.
- Duckers, Peter (2008). The British-Indian Army, 1860–1914. Shire Album Series. Vol. 412. Oxford: Osprey Publishing. ISBN 978-0-7478-0550-2.
- His Highness The Mararaja of Jaipur Sawai Man Singh II (1967). A History of the Indian States Force. Bombay: Orient Longmans. OCLC 473418.
- History of the 15th (Imperial Service) Cavalry Brigade during the Great War 1914–1918. London: His Majesty's Stationery Office (HMSO). 1920. Archived from the original on 21 February 2023.
- Fewster, Kevin; Basarin, Vecihi; Basarin, Hatice Hurmuz (2003). Gallipoli: The Turkish Story. Crows Nest, New South Wales: Allen and Unwin. ISBN 1-74114-045-5.
- Gudmundsson, Bruce (2005). The British Expeditionary Force 1914–15. 16 of Battle Orders. Oxford: Osprey Publishing. ISBN 978-1-84176-902-8.
- Perry, F.W. (1993). Order of Battle of Divisions Part 5B. Indian Army Divisions. Newport: Ray Westlake Military Books. ISBN 1-871167-23-X.
- Preston, Richard Martin (1921). The Desert Mounted Corps: An Account of the Cavalry Operations in Palestine and Syria, 1917–1918. Boston: Houghton Mifflin. OCLC 9116623.
- Raugh, Harold E (2004). The Victorians at War, 1815–1914: An Encyclopedia of British Military History. Santa Barbara: ABC-CLIO. ISBN 978-1-57607-925-6.
- Roy, Kaushik (2011). The Indian Army in the Two World Wars. History of Warfare. Vol. 70. Leiden: BRILL. ISBN 978-90-04-18550-0.
- Punja, Shobita (1990). An Illustrated Guide to Museums of India. Michigan: Guidebook Company. ISBN 978-962-217-143-5.
- Sharma, Gautam (1996). Nationalisation of the Indian Army (1885–1947). Bombay: Allied Publishers. ISBN 978-81-7023-555-2.
- Sumner, Ian (2001). The Indian Army 1914–1947. Osprey Elite Series. Vol. 75. Oxford: Osprey Publishing. ISBN 978-1-84176-196-1.
