= 8th (Lucknow) Division =

- Active: 1903–1922
- Country: (British Raj) British India
- Allegiance: British Empire
- Branch: British Indian Army
- Type: Infantry
- Role: Internal Security
- Size: Division
- Part of: Northern Army
- HQ: Lucknow

The 8th (Lucknow) Division was a formation of the British Indian Army's Northern Army that was first formed as a result of the Kitchener reforms of the Indian Army in 1903. The Division remained in India on internal security duties during World War I, though the 8th (Lucknow) Cavalry Brigade was transferred to the 1st Indian Cavalry Division and served in France on the Western Front, and the 22nd Lucknow Infantry Brigade served as part of the 11th Indian Division in Egypt.

== Division formation in 1914 ==
=== 8th (Lucknow) Cavalry Brigade ===
Commander: Major General Cookson

- 1st King's Dragoon Guards
- 16th Cavalry
- 36th Jacob's Horse
- 39th Central India Horse

=== 22nd (Lucknow) Brigade ===
Commander: Major General A. Wilson

- 3rd Battalion, Royal Fusiliers
- 1st Battalion, King's Own Scottish Borderers
- 17th Infantry (The Loyal Regiment)
- 36th Sikhs
- 74th Punjabis
- U Battery, Royal Horse Artillery
- V Brigade, Royal Field Artillery
  - 63rd, 64th and 73rd Batteries

=== Fyzabad Brigade ===
Commander: Brigadier General Charles Kavanagh

- 12th Cavalry
- 1st Battalion, Leinster Regiment
- 9th Bhopal Infantry

=== Allahabad Brigade ===
Commander: Brigadier General Cowper

- 17th Cavalry
- 1st Battalion, Royal Scots
- 3rd Battalion, Middlesex Regiment
- 62nd Punjabis
- 92nd Punjabis

=== Presidency Brigade ===
Presidency Brigade was based in Calcutta.
Commander: Major General May

- 2nd Battalion, Royal Fusiliers
- 2nd Battalion, King's Own Royal Regiment (Lancaster)
- 1st Battalion, Argyll and Sutherland Highlanders
- 11th Rajputs
- 22nd Punjabis
- 93rd Burma Infantry
- 2/10th Gurkha Rifles
- XVII Brigade RFA
  - 10th, 26th and 92nd Batteries
- 51st and 62nd Companies RGA

=== Unbrigaded ===
- 5th Light Infantry – at Nowgong
- 113th Infantry – at Dibrugarh
- 123rd Outram's Rifles – at Manipur
- 1/8th Gurkha Rifles – at Shillong

== See also ==
- List of Indian divisions in World War I

== Bibliography ==
- Haythornthwaite, Philip J. (1996). The World War One Source Book. London: Arms and Armour Press. ISBN 1-85409-351-7.
- Moberly, Frederick James (1927) [1923]. The Campaign in Mesopotamia 1914–1918. History of the Great War Based on Official Documents. Vol. I. London: HMSO. OCLC 772784341.
- Perry, F.W. (1993). Order of Battle of Divisions Part 5B. Indian Army Divisions. Newport: Ray Westlake Military Books. ISBN 1-871167-23-X.
