= 133rd Regiment =

133rd Regiment may refer to:

- 133rd Field Artillery Regiment, United States
- 133rd Light Anti-Aircraft Regiment, Royal Artillery
- 133rd Infantry Regiment (United States)
- 133rd Regiment of Foot, Britain
- 133rd Tank Regiment, Italy

== American Civil War regiments ==
- 133rd Illinois Infantry Regiment
- 133rd Indiana Infantry Regiment
- 133rd New York Infantry Regiment
- 133rd Ohio Infantry Regiment
- 133rd Pennsylvania Infantry Regiment

== See also ==
- 133rd Division (disambiguation)
