= 10th Indian Division =

- Active: 24 December 1914 – 7 March 1916
- Country: India
- Branch: British Indian Army
- Type: Infantry
- Size: Division
- Engagements: World War I Sinai and Palestine Campaign Actions on the Suez Canal

Commanders
- Notable commanders: Major-General A. Wilson

The 10th Indian Division was an infantry division of the British Indian Army during World War I. It was formed in Egypt in December 1914 with three infantry brigades of Indian Expeditionary Force F. After taking part in the Actions on the Suez Canal, the division was dispersed as its brigades were posted away.

It was re-formed in January 1916 as part of the Suez Canal Defences with units and formations in Egypt, but this was short-lived. It was broken up again on 7 March 1916 as the need to re-form depleted units from France made this plan unrealistic.

The division was commanded throughout its existence by Major-General Alexander Wilson.

== History ==
=== First formation ===
The 28th, 29th and 30th Indian Brigades were formed in October 1914 and posted to Egypt as Indian Expeditionary Force F. The 10th Indian Division was formed on 24 December 1915 with these three brigades, and little else in terms of divisional troops. The division had beat off Turkish attempts to cross the Suez Canal on 3–4 February 1915 in the Actions on the Suez Canal.

Thereafter, the division was soon dissolved with a brigade (30th) sent to Mesopotamia in March 1915, another (29th) detached to Gallipoli from April to December 1915, and the third (28th) detached to Aden from July to September 1915, before it also departed for Mesopotamia in November.

==== Order of Battle, January 1915 ====
The division commanded the following units in January 1915:

- 28th Indian Brigade (Major-General Sir G. Younghusband) (Note: 28th Indian Brigade was formed in October 1914. It was detached to Aden from July to September 1915 (with B Battery HAC and Berkshire RHA). It departed for Mesopotamia in November and joined 7th (Meerut) Division in December.)
  - 51st Sikhs (Frontier Force)
  - 53rd Sikhs (Frontier Force)
  - 56th Punjabi Rifles (Frontier Force)
  - 1/5th Gurkha Rifles
- 29th Indian Brigade (Brigadier-General H.V. Cox) (Note: 29th Indian Brigade was formed in October 1914. It raided Sheikh Saiad on 10 November 1914 en route to Egypt. It was detached to Gallipoli from April to December 1915 as Indian Expeditionary Force G, attached to the British 29th Division.)
  - 14th King George's Own Ferozepore Sikhs
  - 69th Punjabis
  - 89th Punjabis
  - 1/6th Gurkha Rifles
- 30th Indian Brigade (Major-General C.J. Melliss) (Note: 30th Indian Brigade was formed in October 1914. It was sent to Mesopotamia in March 1915 where it joined 12th Indian Division and later 6th (Poona) Division.)
  - 24th Punjabis
  - 76th Punjabis
  - 126th Baluchistan Infantry
  - 2/7th Gurkha Rifles
- Divisional troops
  - VII Mountain Brigade, IMA (Note: Detached to Gallipoli from April to December 1915.)
    - 21st Kohat Mountain Battery (Frontier Force)
    - 26th Jacob's Mountain Battery
  - Field Ambulances
    - 105th Indian Field Ambulance
    - 108th Indian Field Ambulance (Note: Served in Gallipoli with 29th Indian Brigade.)
    - 123rd Indian Field Ambulance
    - 135th Indian Field Ambulance

=== Re-formed ===
The division was re-formed on 7 January 1916 as part of the Suez Canal Defences with units and formations in Egypt: 20th Indian Brigade joined from 7th (Meerut) Division, 29th Indian Brigade rejoined from Gallipoli and 31st Indian Brigade joined from 11th Indian Division. The new division was short-lived: it was broken up again on 7 March 1916 as the need to re-form depleted units from France made this plan unrealistic.

==== Order of Battle, January 1916 ====
The division commanded the following units in January 1916:

- 20th Indian Brigade (Brigadier-General H.D. Watson) (Note: 20th and 29th Indian Brigades became independent in March 1916.)
  - 2/2nd Gurkha Rifles
  - 2/3rd Gurkha Rifles
  - 39th Garhwal Rifles (Note: 1st and 2nd Battalions, 39th Garhwal Rifles amalgamated in April 1915.)
  - 4th Gwalior Infantry (I.S.)
- 29th Indian Brigade (Brigadier-General P.C. Palin)
  - 14th King George's Own Ferozepore Sikhs
  - 57th Wilde's Rifles (Frontier Force)
  - 1/5th Gurkha Rifles
  - 1/6th Gurkha Rifles
- 31st Indian Brigade (Brigadier-General A.H. Bingley) (Note: 31st Indian Brigade was broken up on 13 February 1916.)
  - 58th Vaughan's Rifles (Frontier Force)
  - 1/4th Gurkha Rifles
  - 2/8th Gurkha Rifles
  - 1st Patiala Infantry (I.S.)
- Divisional Troops
  - Unbridaged
    - 33rd Punjabis
    - 2/10th Gurkha Rifles
    - Alwar Infantry (I.S.)
  - Mounted Troops
    - Mysore Lancers (I.S.)
    - Patiala Lancers (I.S.)
    - Hyderabad Lancers (I.S.)
    - Bikaner Camel Corps (I.S.)
  - Artillery
    - Hong Kong and Singapore Royal Artillery Battery
  - Engineers
    - 10th Company, 2nd Queen's Own Sappers and Miners
  - Pioneers
    - 23rd Sikh Pioneers
  - Field Ambulances
    - 105th Indian Field Ambulance
    - 108th Indian Field Ambulance
    - 123rd Indian Field Ambulance
    - 135th Indian Field Ambulance

== See also ==
- List of Indian divisions in World War I

== Bibliography ==
- Perry, F.W. (1993). Order of Battle of Divisions Part 5B. Indian Army Divisions. Newport: Ray Westlake Military Books. ISBN 1-871167-23-X.
- Rinaldi, Richard A (2008). Order of Battle of the British Army 1914. Ravi Rikhye. ISBN 978-0-97760728-0.
- Sumner, Ian (2001). The Indian Army 1914-1947. Oxford: Osprey Publishing. ISBN 1-84176-196-6.
