= 128th Pioneers =

- Active: 1846–1922
- Country: British India
- Branch: British Indian Army
- Part of: Bombay Army (to 1895); Bombay Command
- Colors: Red; faced pale yellow, 1882 yellow
- Engagements: Second Anglo-Burmese War; Sudan Campaign; Tirah Campaign; World War I

The 128th Pioneers were an infantry regiment of the British Indian Army. The regiment traces their origins to 1846, when they were raised as the 28th Bombay Native Infantry.

The regiments first action was in Afghanistan during the Second Afghan War in the Battle of Kandahar. In 1885, they were sent to Egypt to take part in the Sudan Campaign. They played an active part in the Battle of Tofrek and the Battle of Suakin. On their return to India, they were part of the force gathered for the Tirah Campaign in 1897.

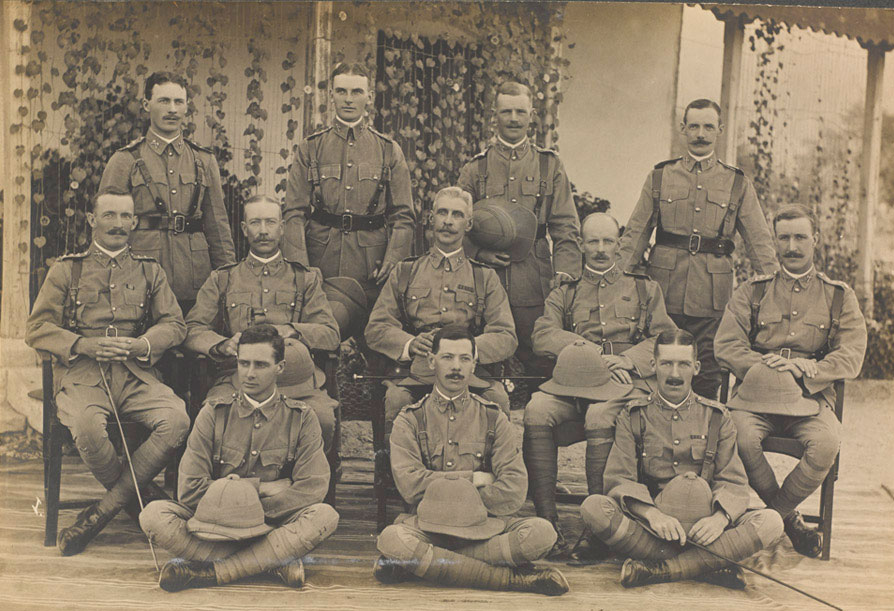
Officers of the 128th Pioneers, Quetta, 1908.

During World War I, they were sent to Egypt, to guard the Suez Canal from Turkish forces. They were originally attached to the 10th Indian Division but moved to the 11th Indian Division in 1916.

After World War I, the Indian government reformed the army moving from single battalion regiments to multi battalion regiments. In 1922, the 128th Pioneers became the 3rd Battalion, 2nd Bombay Pioneers. The regiment was disbanded in 1932.

== William St. Lucien Chase ==
William St. Lucien Chase was awarded the Victoria Cross when a lieutenant in the 28th Bombay Native Infantry during the Second Afghan War when, on 16 August 1880, at Deh Khoja, near Kandahar, Afghanistan, Chase, with the help of Private Thomas Elsdon Ashford, rescued and carried, for a distance of over 200 yards, under enemy fire, a wounded soldier who had taken shelter in a block house. Several times they were compelled to rest, but they persevered and finally brought the wounded man to a place of safety.

== Predecessor names ==
- 28th Bombay Native Infantry - 1846
- 28th Bombay Infantry - 1885
- 28th (Pioneer) Regiment of Bombay Infantry - 1888
- 28th Bombay Pioneers - 1901
- 128th Pioneers
