= 21st Kohat Mountain Battery (Frontier Force) =

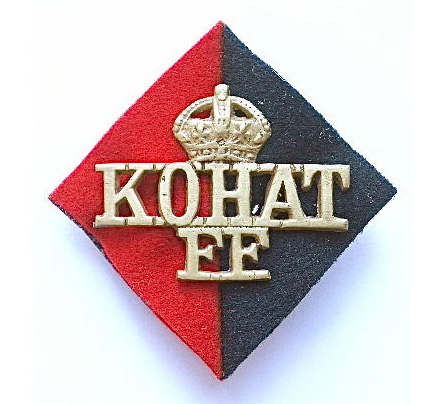
- Active: 1851 - Present
- Country: (United Kingdom) British India (1851 - 1947); Pakistan (1947 - Present)
- Branch: (British Raj) British Indian Army; Pakistan Army
- Type: Artillery
- Size: Battery
- Uniform: Blue; faced scarlet
- Engagements: Second Afghan War 1878-80; Tirah Campaign 1897-98; First World War (Egypt, Gallipoli, Mesopotamia, Persia) 1914-18; Second World War (Burma) 1939-45; Kashmir War 1948; Indo-Pakistan War 1965; Indo-Pakistan War 1971

The 21st Kohat Mountain Battery (Frontier Force) was an artillery unit of the British Indian Army. It was raised in 1851 as the No. 2 Horse or Punjab Light Field Battery, Punjab Irregular Force. It became the 21st Kohat Mountain Battery (Frontier Force) in 1903. In 1947, it was transferred to the Pakistan Army, where it exists as the 2nd Royal Kohat Battery (Frontier Force) of The First (SP) Medium Regiment Artillery (Frontier Force).

== History ==
The 21st Kohat Mountain Battery was raised at Bannu by Lieutenant H Hammond on 1 February 1851 from horse artillery detachments of the Lahore Durbar, as part of the Punjab Irregular Force (Piffer). The Piffers were a collection of regular units accreted for expeditionary operations in the Punjab Frontier and Afghanistan. 21st Kohat Mountain Battery was the first unit to be formally raised as a permanent part of the Punjab Irregular Force, later designated as the Punjab Frontier Force. Is the senior most unit of the Frontier Force Regiment. After 1903 reforms, the Punjab Frontier Force began to cease to be an expeditionary force and incorporated permanent units.

The Frontier Force earned legendary fame for its exploits on the Northwest Frontier of India. The Kohat Battery saw extensive service on the Frontier and took part in numerous operations including the Second Afghan War and the Tirah Campaign in 1897–98.

During the First World War, the 21st Kohat Mountain Battery fought with great distinction at Gallipoli, Egypt, Mesopotamia and Persia. For its outstanding performance in the war, it was awarded the title of ‘Royal’ in 1922. After the war, it again saw service on the Northwest Frontier. During the Second World War, it fought in the Burma Campaign as part of the 17th Indian Division. In 1944, it became an exclusively Punjabi Muslim unit.

In 1947, it was transferred to the Pakistan Army, where it became part of the 1st Mountain Regiment, Royal Pakistan Artillery. The battery fought in the Kashmir War of 1948. In 1957, it was equipped with 105 mm Self Propelled Field guns and the 1st Mountain Regiment was re-designated as the 1st (SP) Field Regiment, Artillery. The regiment fought with great gallantry in the Battle of Chawinda during the Indo-Pakistani War of 1965. In the Indo-Pakistani War of 1971, the regiment served in the Zafarwal Sector. In 1980, it was re-equipped with medium guns. The battery is affiliated with the Frontier Force Regiment.

== Battle honours ==
Peiwar Kotal, Kabul 1879, Afghanistan 1878–80, Tirah, Punjab Frontier, Suez Canal, Egypt 1915–16, Mesopotamia 1916–18, Persia 1918, Anzac, Landing at Anzac, Defence of Anzac, Suvla, Sari Bair, Gallipoli 1915.

== Genealogy ==
- 1851 - No. 2 Horse or Punjab Light Field Battery, Punjab Irregular Force
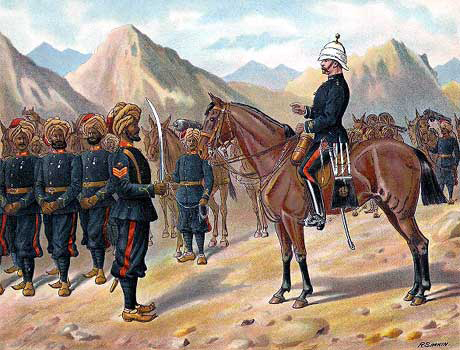
  The No. 1 Kohat Mountain Battery, Punjab Frontier Force. Chromolithograph by Richard Simkin, c. 1896.
- 1865 - No. 2 Horse or Punjab Light Field Battery, Punjab Frontier Force
- 1877 - No. 1 Mountain Battery, Punjab Frontier Force
- 1879 - No. 1 Kohat Mountain Battery, Punjab Frontier Force
- 1890 - No. 1 (Kohat) Mountain Battery, Punjab Frontier Force
- 1901 - Kohat Mountain Battery
- 1903 - 21st Kohat Mountain Battery (Frontier Force)
- 1920 - 21st Kohat Pack Battery (Frontier Force)
- 1921 - 101st (Kohat) Pack Battery
- 1922 - 101st Royal (Kohat) Pack Battery (Frontier Force) (How)
- 1924 - 101st Royal (Kohat) Pack Battery, Royal Artillery (Frontier Force) (How)
- 1927 - 1st Royal (Kohat) Indian Mountain Battery, Royal Artillery (Frontier Force) (How)
- 1928 - 1st Royal (Kohat) Mountain Battery, Royal Artillery (Frontier Force) (How)
- 1939 - 1st Royal (Kohat) Mountain Battery, Frontier Force, Indian Artillery
- 1942 - 1st Royal (Kohat) Indian Mountain Battery, Frontier Force, Indian Artillery
- 1945 - 1st Royal (Kohat) Indian Mountain Battery, Frontier Force, Royal Indian Artillery
- 1947 - 2nd Royal (Kohat) Mountain Battery, Frontier Force, Royal Pakistan Artillery
- 1956 - 2nd Royal (Kohat) Mountain Battery, Frontier Force, Artillery
- 1957 - 2 Royal Kohat (SP) Field Battery, Artillery (FF)
- 1980 - 2 Royal Kohat (SP) Medium Battery, Artillery (FF)
