= Alexander Wilson (British Army officer) =

British Army general

Major-General Sir Alexander Wilson KCB
- Born: Alexander Andrew Wilson; 29 October 1858; Framsden, Suffolk, England
- Died: 7 July 1937 (aged 78)
- Military career
- Allegiance: United Kingdom
- Branch: British Army
- Rank: Major-General
- Commands: 1st battalion Argyll and Sutherland Highlanders; 15th Infantry Brigade; Lucknow Brigade; Indian Expeditionary Force E Lieutenant Governor of Jersey
- Conflicts: Anglo-Zulu War; Second Boer War; World War I
- Awards: Knight Commander of the Order of the Bath

Major-General Sir Alexander Andrew Wilson KCB (29 October 1858 – 7 July 1937) was a senior British Army officer, Colonel of the Argyll and Sutherland Highlanders and Lieutenant Governor of Jersey between the years 1916 and 1920.

== Military career ==
Educated at Lancing College, from 1872 to 1876, he was subsequently commissioned into the Suffolk Artillery Militia before obtaining a regular army commission as a Second Lieutenant in the Argyll and Sutherland Highlanders on 22 February 1879 and served with the regiment through the Anglo-Zulu War of 1879 before being appointed Commandant of Colonial Forces, Western Australia in 1895.

Wilson returned from Australia to fight with his regiment during the Second Boer War and was appointed commanding officer of the 1st Battalion after the Battle of Magersfontein in 1899.

He relinquished command of the battalion and was placed on half-pay and was also promoted to brevet colonel on 12 December 1903.

He was awarded a Companion of the Order of the Bath (CB) in the 1908 Birthday Honours in June 1908.

On 1 April 1908 he succeeded Vesey John Dawson as general officer commanding (GOC) of the 15th Infantry Brigade and was granted the temporary rank of brigadier general whilst employed in this role. He held this command for over three years, during which time he received a promotion to major general on 1 May 1911, before succeeding Major General Henry Buckley Burton Watkis as commander of the Lucknow Brigade, part of the 8th (Lucknow) Division in India in October 1911.

He served under Sir John Maxwell in the Sinai and Palestine campaign (World War I) as General Officer Commanding Indian Expeditionary Force E, Canal Defences and was mentioned in dispatches whilst commanding the Suez Canal defences against the Turkish attack through 1915–1916. He was also appointed KCB in January 1916. He relinquished command of Indian Expeditionary Force E and was appointed Lieutenant Governor of Jersey from 7 October 1916 to 20 October 1920.

In addition, in 1915 he was appointed regimental colonel of the Regiment (Argyll and Sutherland Highlanders), an appointment he held until his death in 1937.

He married Jane Leith-Hay Graham, daughter of Robert Graham, 14th of Fintry. Their son Alexander Robert Graham Wilson DSO also later rose to command of the 1st Battalion, Argyll and Sutherland Highlanders.

Government offices
Preceded by Sir Alexander Rochfort	Lieutenant Governor of Jersey; 1916–1920	Succeeded by Sir William Smith
