= Imperial Service Troops =

Forces of princely states in India

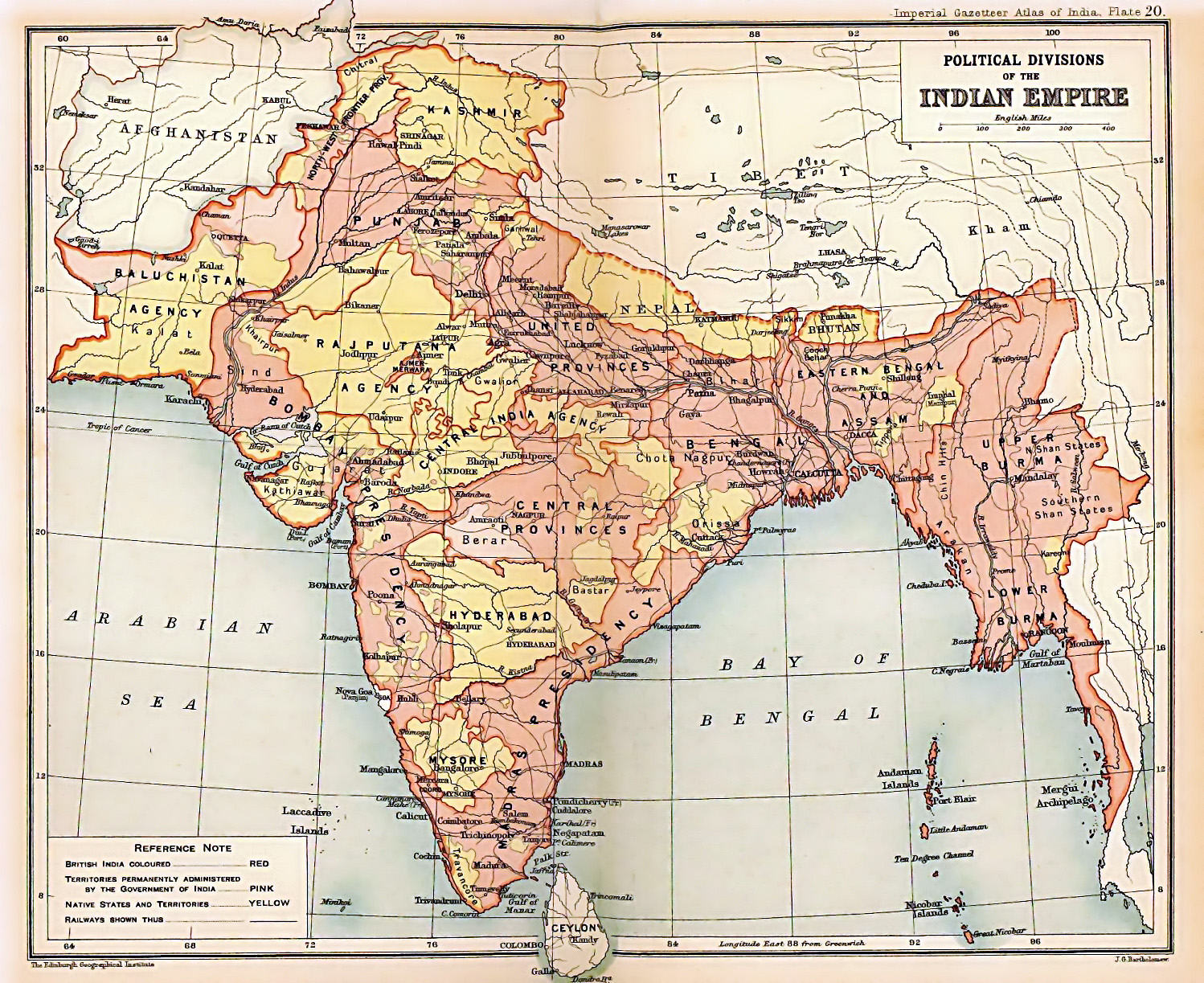
The Indian Empire 1909, showing the princely states coloured yellow and British India coloured red

The Imperial Service Troops, officially called the Indian States Forces after 1920, were auxiliary forces raised by the princely states of the Indian Empire which were deployed alongside the Indian Army when their service was required. The Imperial Service Troops were inaugurated in 1888 by the Viceroy of India. At the beginning of the 20th century, their total numbers were about 18,000 men.

The troops were routinely inspected by British officers and generally had the same equipment as soldiers in the Indian Army. Although their numbers were relatively small, the Imperial Service Troops were employed in China and British Somaliland in the first decade of the 20th century, and later saw action in the First World War and Second World War.

== Genesis ==
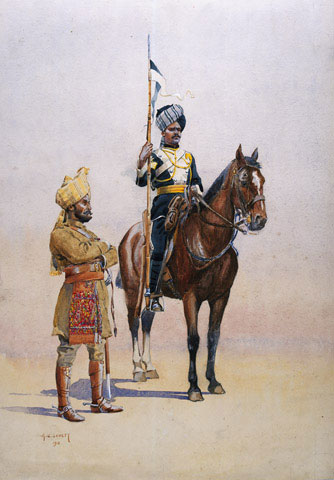
Mysore Imperial Service Troops circa 1910

In March 1885, after a Russian force defeated the Afghan army at Panjdeh, a village on the ill-defined Russian-Afghan frontier, the British were alarmed and immediately dispatched units from the Indian Army to reinforce the North-West Frontier defenses. The "Panjdeh incident," however, also resulted in generous donations of money for a potential war effort from many Indian rulers, most notably the Nizam of Hyderabad. Although the incident was later resolved by a compromise, the timely support of the Indian princes prompted the British to create a reserve force of approximately 20,000 soldiers recruited from the armies of the Native States, but trained and equipped by the Indian Army. The cost of the training and new equipment was borne by the Native States.

== Armies of the Princely States ==
The armies of the Princely States were bound by many restrictions that were imposed by subsidiary alliances. They existed mainly for ceremonial use and for internal policing. According to the Imperial Gazetteer of India vol. IV 1907, p. 85,

"Since a chief can neither attack his neighbour nor fall out with a foreign nation, it follows that he needs no military establishment which is not required either for police purposes or personal display, or for cooperation with the Imperial Government. The treaty made with Gwalior in 1844, and the instrument of transfer given to Mysore in 1881, alike base the restriction of the forces of the State upon the broad ground of protection. The former explained in detail that unnecessary armies were embarrassing to the State itself and the cause of disquietude to others: a few months later a striking proof of this was afforded by the army of the Sikh kingdom of Lahore. The British Government has undertaken to protect the dominions of the Native princes from invasion and even from rebellion within: its army is organized for the defence not merely of British India, but of all the possessions under the suzerainty of the King-Emperor."

In addition, other restrictions were imposed:

"The treaties with most of the larger States are clear on this point. Posts in the interior must not be fortified, factories for the production of guns and ammunition must not be constructed, nor may the subjects of other States be enlisted in the local forces. ... They must allow the forces that defend them to obtain local supplies, to occupy cantonments or positions, and to arrest deserters; and in addition to these services they must recognize the Imperial control of the railways, telegraphs, and postal communications as essential not only to the common welfare but to the common defence."

=== Equipment and training ===
With the establishment of the Imperial Service Troops scheme in 1885, the Government of India undertook to contribute equipment and weapons to states' forces units listed as being available for deployment when called upon. In return the princely states were required to bring the pledged troops up to a level of preparation that would enable them to serve alongside regular Indian regiments. To this end Indian Army officers were seconded to Imperial Service Troops units and schools of instruction were established for IST recruits. A senior British officer was appointed as Inspector-General of Imperial Service Troops with a staff of inspectors to undertake IST training and advise the military durbars of each of the states. In addition to the units committed to Imperial Service, the larger princely states continued to maintain traditional units for ceremonial purposes, though much reduced in numbers.

=== Early campaigns ===
Kashmir was the first of the participating states to provide a contingent for active service. This took the form of two mountain batteries who fought in the Hunza Nagar campaign of 1891 and the subsequent Chitral Expedition of 1895. Nine Indian states provided Imperial Service detachments for the Frontier War of 1897.

Alwar, Bikaner, Jodhpur and Malerkotla provided units for service in China during the Boxer Rebellion of 1901. The Bikaner Camel Corps subsequently served in Somaliland in 1902. While it was not British policy to employ Indian troops in the South African War of 1899–1902, considerable numbers of horses and quantities of equipment from Imperial Service stocks were provided by the princely states.

The various Imperial Service units often had elaborate parade uniforms, designed and changed at the whim of individual state rulers. When mobilized for active service the plain khaki drill service dress of the regular Indian Army was worn.

=== Imperial Service Troops in the First World War ===
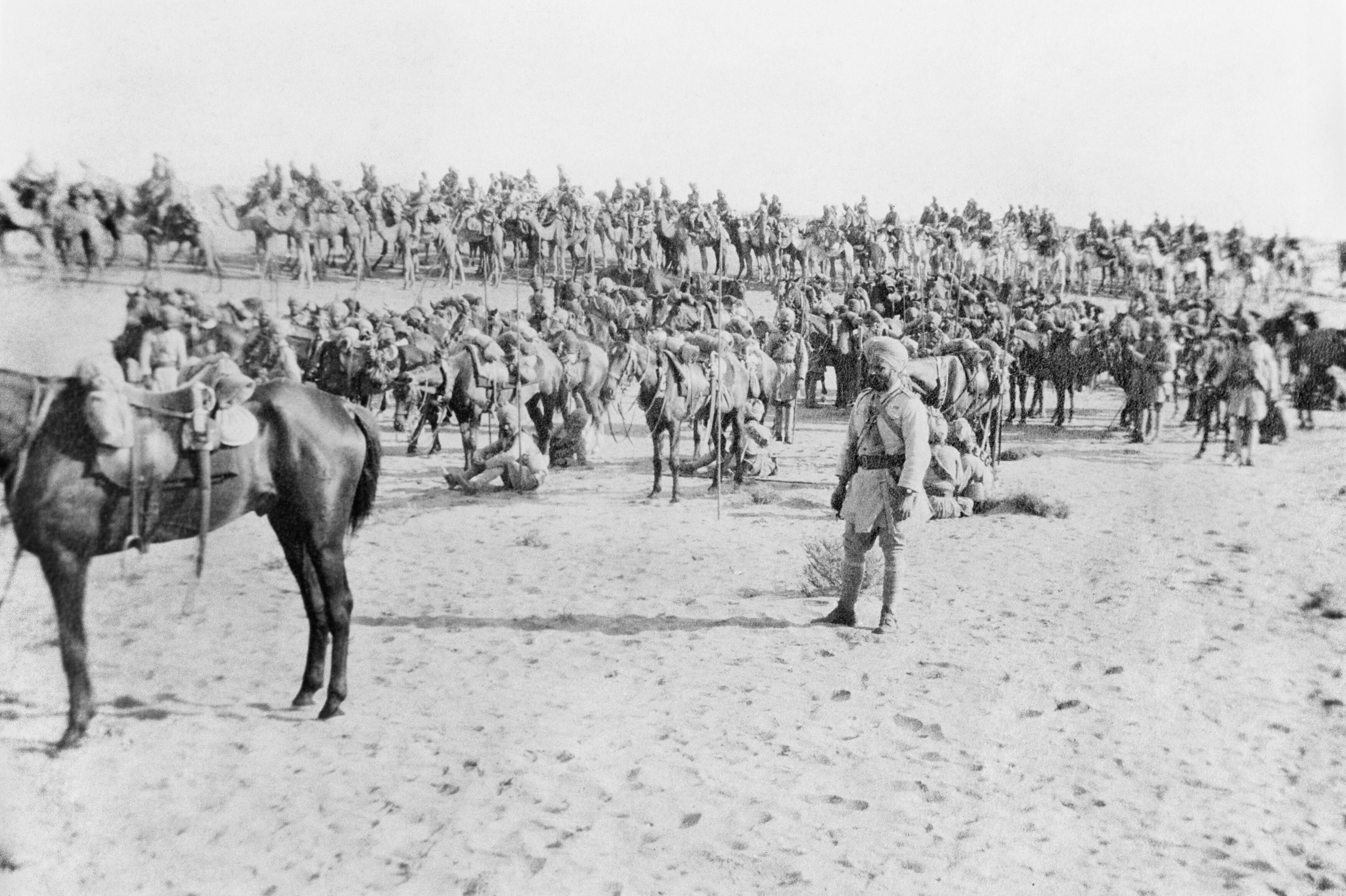
Mysore and Bengal Lancers with Bikaner Camel Corps in the Sinai Desert, Egypt, 1915.

On the eve of war in 1914, twenty-nine Indian states were providing soldiers for the Imperial Service Troops scheme. These totalled 22,479 of whom 7,673 were cavalry, 10,298 infantry and 2,723 transport corps. Smaller numbers served as artillery, sappers and signals personnel, while Camel Corps troopers, mainly recruited in Bikaner, numbered 637. During the First World War 18,000 Imperial Service soldiers saw service in Mesopotamia, Egypt, Palestine and East Africa, including the Jammu and Kashmir State Forces. The Kashmir Rifles fought with distinction at the Battle of Tanga when other troops were routed by the defending German colonial forces.

Sappers and transport units were sent to France. Contingents from the smaller states did not serve overseas but were employed, on internal security duties or training cavalry remounts, in India itself. In the emotional atmosphere prevailing at the beginning of the war many of the Indian rulers went beyond meeting the standing commitment to make Imperial Service Troops available for whatever purpose the Government of India decided. In September 1914 the Viceroy Lord Hardinge reported that 700 Indian princes had offered their services in various forms from the sending of troops to the provision of hospital ships or financial assistance.

==== Imperial Service Cavalry Brigade ====
From 1914 to 1916, as part of the Egyptian Expeditionary Force commanded by General Maxwell, the Imperial Service Cavalry Brigade with the 10th and 11th Indian Divisions, the Bikaner Camel Corps and three batteries of Indian Mountain Artillery, took part in the Defence of the Suez Canal Campaign at the beginning of the Sinai and Palestine campaign.

The Imperial Service Cavalry Brigade, made up of the Jodhpore Imperial Service Lancers, the Mysore Imperial Service Lancers and the 1st Hyderabad Imperial Service Lancers, continued to serve in the Egyptian Expeditionary Force during 1917. In 1918 these regiments formed the 15th (Imperial Service) Cavalry Brigade, commanded by Brigadier General Cyril Rodney Harbord, in the 5th Cavalry Division commanded by Major General H. J. Macandrew. They took part in the cavalry phase of the Battle of Megiddo and were still fighting when the war ended near Aleppo after advancing from Damascus.

=== Between the wars ===
In 1920 the Imperial Service Troops system was reviewed and revised. The renamed Indian States Forces were divided into Field Service Units: organized, trained and armed to regular Indian Army standards, and General Service Units kept available as a reserve. The GSU would be upgraded as needed. A third category consisting of militia could be mobilized for internal security duties but were armed and equipped to a lower standard. On paper the Indian States Forces comprised approximately 50,000 men drawn from forty-nine states. Economic and other considerations slowed progress in introducing the new scheme, which was not fully implemented until 1939.

=== Second World War ===
During the Second World War the princely states provided 250,000 men for service with the Indian States Forces (ISF). ISF units saw service in Malaya, Burma, North Africa, the Middle East and Italy while detachments served as garrison and internal security troops in India itself. Five ISF battalions were part of the garrison of Singapore when it fell to the Japanese in February 1942.

=== Post Independence ===
Following 1947, sixty-nine former Indian States Forces units were transferred into the part of the Indian Army which transferred to the new Dominion of India. ISF infantry units were generally added to existing regular regiments: the 1st and 2nd Patiala Infantry for example becoming the 15th and 16th (Patiala) battalions of the Punjab Regiment. Six ISF cavalry regiments were however amalgamated to form the newly raised 61st Cavalry, which remains the only horse mounted non-ceremonial unit in the Indian Army. Four ISF infantry regiments and one mountain artillery battery were incorporated into the new Pakistan Army.

== Imperial Service Troops in popular culture ==
- John Masters' book "The Ravi Lancers" uses the experiences of a fictional Imperial Service cavalry regiment in France during the First World War to illustrate the divide between the feudal culture and relationships of a princely state and the mechanical brutality of modern warfare.

== See also ==
- British Indian Army
- Regiments of the Indian Army (1903) – Imperial Service Troops
