= 11th Indian Division =

- Active: 24 December 1914 – 31 May 1915
- Country: India
- Branch: British Indian Army
- Type: Infantry
- Size: Division
- Engagements: World War I Sinai and Palestine Campaign Actions on the Suez Canal

Commanders
- Notable commanders: Alexander Wallace

The 11th Indian Division was an infantry division of the British Indian Army during World War I. It was formed in December 1914 with two infantry brigades already in Egypt and a third formed in January 1915. After taking part in the Actions on the Suez Canal, the division was dispersed as its brigades were posted away.

The division was commanded throughout its existence by Major-General Alexander Wallace.

== History ==
The pre-war 22nd (Lucknow) Brigade and the 32nd (Imperial Service) Brigade (formed in October 1914) were posted to Egypt to help defend the Suez Canal. The 11th Indian Division was formed on 24 December 1914 with these two brigades, and little else in terms of divisional troops. A third brigade (31st) was formed in January 1915 with other units already in Egypt. The division beat off Turkish attempts to cross the Suez Canal on 3–4 February 1915 in the Actions on the Suez Canal.

Thereafter, the division was dissolved in May 1915 with its brigades posted to the Suez Canal Defences. The brigades did not last much longer: the 22nd and 32nd Brigades bere broken up in January 1916 and the 31st Brigade joined 10th Indian Division at the same time, but was also broken up a month later.

=== Order of Battle, January 1915 ===
The division commanded the following units in January 1915:

- Imperial Service Cavalry Brigade
  - 1st Hyderabad Lancers
  - Mysore Lancers
  - Patiala Lancers
- 22nd (Lucknow) Brigade (Brigadier-General W.A. Watson) (Note: 22nd (Lucknow) Brigade was mobilized by 8th (Lucknow) Division and arrived in Egypt in November 1914. It was broken up in January 1916.)
  - 2/10th Gurkha Rifles
  - 3rd Brahmans
  - 62nd Punjabis
  - 92nd Punjabis
- 31st Indian Brigade (Brigadier-General A.H. Bingley) (Note: 31st Indian Brigade was formed in Egypt in January 1915. It transferred to 10th Indian Division in January 1916.)
  - 2nd Queen Victoria's Own Rajput Light Infantry
  - 27th Punjabis
  - 93rd Burma Infantry
  - 128th Pioneers
- 32nd (Imperial Service) Brigade (Brigadier-General H.D. Watson) (Note: 32nd (Imperial Service) Brigade was formed in October 1914. It was broken up in January 1916.)
  - 33rd Punjabis
  - Alwar Infantry (I.S.)
  - 4th Gwalior Infantry (I.S.)
  - 1st Patiala Infantry (I.S.)
- Divisional troops
  - 23rd Sikh Pioneers
  - 21st (Kohat) Mountain Battery (Frontier Force)
  - 121st Indian Field Ambulance
  - 124th Indian Field Ambulance

== See also ==
- List of Indian divisions in World War I

== Bibliography ==
- Perry, F.W. (1993). Order of Battle of Divisions Part 5B. Indian Army Divisions. Newport: Ray Westlake Military Books. ISBN 1-871167-23-X.
- Rinaldi, Richard A (2008). Order of Battle of the British Army 1914. Ravi Rikhye. ISBN 978-0-97760728-0.
- Sumner, Ian (2001). The Indian Army 1914-1947. Oxford: Osprey Publishing. ISBN 1-84176-196-6.
