= 6th Indian Cavalry Brigade =

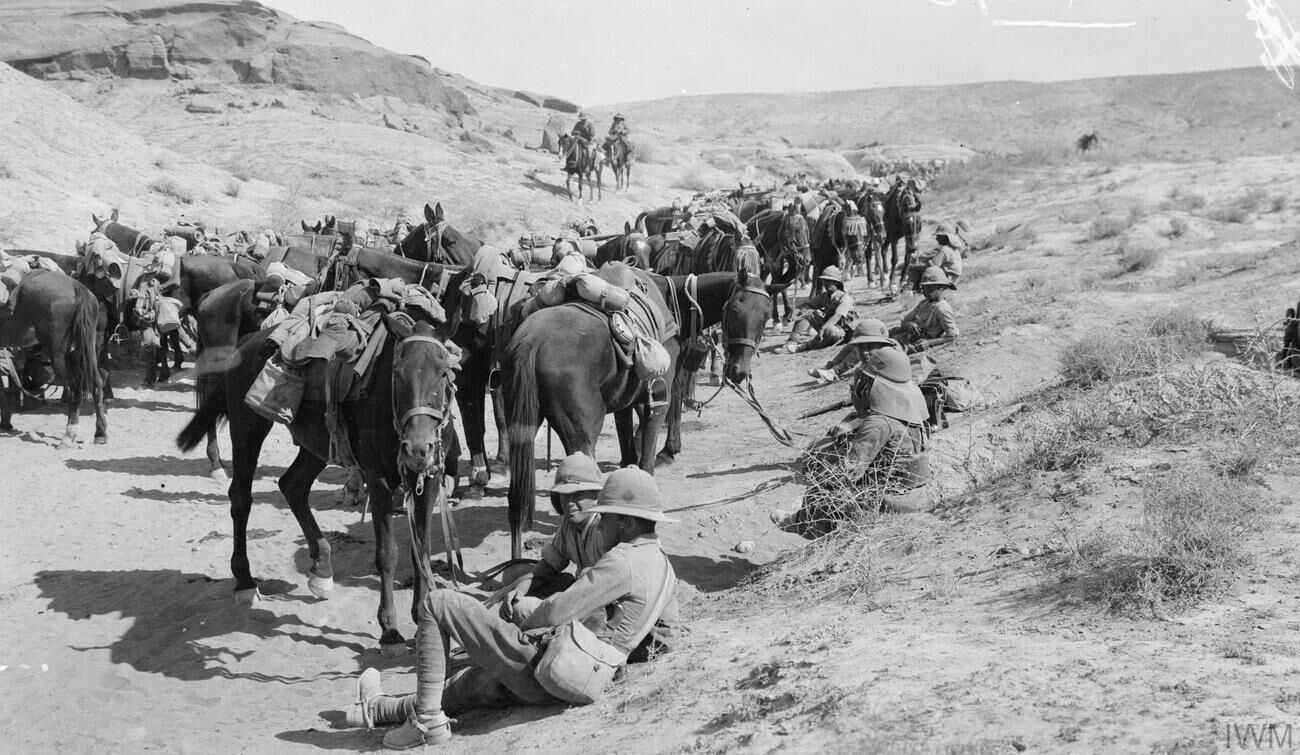
- 14th (King's) Hussars resting at the roadside after the third action of Jebel Hamrin, December 1917
- Active: 10 March 1915 – March 1919
- Country: British India
- Allegiance: British Crown
- Branch: British Indian Army
- Type: Cavalry
- Size: Brigade
- Part of: 6th (Poona) Division; Cavalry Division (Mesopotamia)
- Engagements: First World War Mesopotamian Campaign Battle of Shaiba Battle of Ctesiphon (1915) Battle of Sheikh Sa'ad Battle of Wadi (1916) Battle of Hanna Battle of Dujaila Second Battle of Kut Battles of Ramadi (1917)

The 6th Indian Cavalry Brigade was a cavalry brigade of the British Indian Army that saw active service in the Indian Army during the First World War. It took part in the Mesopotamian campaign and was broken up soon after the end of the war.

== History ==
On 21 February 1915, orders were sent from India to form a cavalry brigade in Mesopotamia. As a result, the 6th Indian Cavalry Brigade was formed with the 33rd Queen Victoria's Own Light Cavalry which had arrived in Mesopotamia in November 1914 with 6th (Poona) Division, 16th Cavalry and S Battery, Royal Horse Artillery which arrived earlier in the month, and 7th Hariana Lancers which departed India on 28 February to complete the brigade. It served in the campaign in Mesopotamia for the rest of the First World War.

Initially acting in an independent role, the brigade took part in the Battle of Shaiba (12–14 April 1915) where Major George Wheeler of the 7th Hariana Lancers won the Victoria Cross, and Operations in Persian Arabistan (21 April–18 June) including the Affair of Khafajiya (14–16 May). It then took part in the Battle of Es Sinn (28 September) that resulted in the capture of Kut al Amara. From 6 October, the brigade was placed under the command of the 6th (Poona) Division and with it took part in the advance on Baghdad including the Battle of Ctesiphon (22–24 November) and the subsequent withdrawal (the Affair of Umm at Tabul on 1 December) back to Kut. It left the division there on 6 December before it got besieged.

From the start of 1916, the brigade was involved in efforts to raise the siege, including the Action of Sheikh Sa'ad (6–8 January), the Action of the Wadi (13 January), the First Attack on Hanna (21 January) and the Attack on the Dujaila Redoubt (8 March). These were in vain and the division surrendered on 29 April.

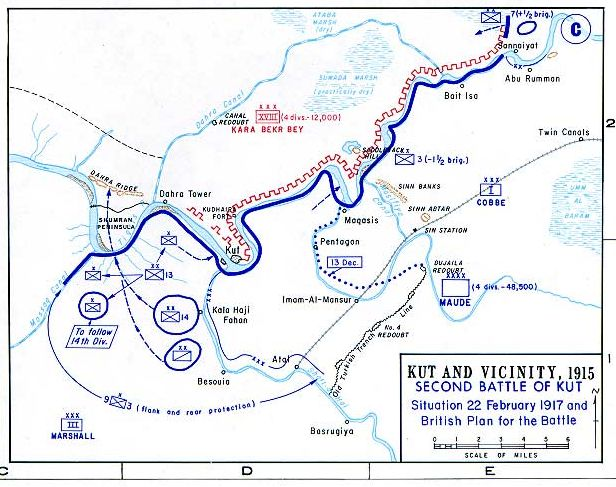
Situation at Kut on 22 February 1917

On 8 December 1916, The Cavalry Division was organized from the 6th and 7th Indian Cavalry Brigades, the latter having arrived from the Western Front in August. With the division, it took part in the Second Battle of Kut including the Advance to the Hai and Capture of the Khudaira Bend (14 December 1916 – 19 January 1917), the Capture of the Hai Salient (25 January–5 February 1917), the Capture of the Dahra Bend (9–16 February).

It then took part in the pursuit to Baghdad and a number of actions later in 1917, notably the Second Battle of Ramadi (28–29 September). The Cavalry Division was dissolved on 8 April 1918, and the brigade continued to serve as an independent formation. It took part in the Affair of Kulawand (27 April), the action of Tuz Khurmatli (29 April) and, finally, the occupation of Kirkuk (7 May).

After the Armistice of Mudros, the brigade was not selected to form part of the occupation forces for Mesopotamia. In February and March 1919, the last of the units sailed for India and the brigade was no more.

== Order of battle ==
The brigade commanded the following units during the First World War:

Cavalry regiments

- 33rd Queen Victoria's Own Light Cavalry (joined on formation from 6th (Poona) Division; left in October 1916 for 3rd Lahore Divisional Area)
- 16th Cavalry (joined on formation from Lucknow, 8th (Lucknow) Division; left in October 1916 for 4th (Quetta) Division)
- 7th Hariana Lancers (joined on formation from Ferozepore, 3rd Lahore Divisional Area; left in June 1916 for 9th (Secunderabad) Division)
- 23rd Cavalry (Frontier Force) (arrived on 10 June 1915 from 3rd Lahore Divisional Area and attached until August; later joined the 7th Indian Cavalry Brigade)
- 14th (King's) Hussars (joined on 28 November 1915 from 4th (Meerut) Cavalry Brigade, 7th Meerut Divisional Area; attached to 14th Indian Division from April 1918)
- 4th Cavalry (formerly divisional cavalry of 7th (Meerut) Division; attached to the brigade January – June and August – October 1916 then to 7th Meerut Divisional Area)
- 21st Prince Albert Victor’s Own Cavalry (Frontier Force) (joined in November 1916 from 3rd Lahore Divisional Area)
- 22nd Sam Browne's Cavalry (Frontier Force) (joined in November 1916 from 9th (Secunderabad) Division; left in April 1918 and joined 15th Indian Division in August)
- 11th King Edward's Own Lancers (Probyn's Horse) (arrived from Derajat Brigade in October 1917 and joined the brigade in August 1918)
- 1st Patiala Lancers (I.S.) (arrived in Mesopotamia in June 1916 and joined the brigade in August 1918) (Note: The 1st Patiala Lancers (I.S.) served in Egypt from November 1914 to May 1916 with the Imperial Service Cavalry Brigade.)

Support units

- S Battery, Royal Horse Artillery (joined on formation from Bangalore, 9th (Secunderabad) Division)
- 6th Cavalry Brigade Signal Troop (joined on formation)
- 6th Cavalry Brigade Supply and Transport Company (joined on formation)
- 131st Combined Cavalry Field Ambulance (from December 1915) (Note: The 131st Indian Cavalry and 18th Cavalry Field Ambulances joined in December 1915. They were reorganized as the 131st and 18th Combined Cavalry Field Ambulances in September 1916. The 18th departed before January 1917.)
- 2nd Troop, 2nd Queen Victoria's Own Madras Miners and Sappers (joined in May 1916)
- 6th Machine Gun Squadron (joined in September 1916)
- 15th Machine Gun Squadron (renumbered from 6th in May 1917)
- 5th Mobile Veterinary Section (joined in May 1917)

== Commanders ==
The brigade had the following commanders:

From	Rank	Name	Notes
10 March 1915	Brigadier-General	H. Kennedy	
28 October 1915	Brigadier-General	H.L. Roberts	sick, 17 January 1916
15 February 1916	Brigadier-General	R.C. Stephen	sick, 18 May 1916
28 May 1916	Brigadier-General	M.E. Willoughby	
11 July 1916	Brigadier-General	S.F. Crocker	
10 February 1917	Brigadier-General	P. Holland-Pryor	brigade broken up by March 1918

== Bibliography ==
- Griffith, Paddy (1998). British Fighting Methods in the Great War. Routledge. ISBN 978-0-71463495-1.
- Perry, F.W. (1993). Order of Battle of Divisions Part 5B. Indian Army Divisions. Newport: Ray Westlake Military Books. ISBN 1-871167-23-X.
- Rinaldi, Richard A (2008). Order of Battle of the British Army 1914. Ravi Rikhye. ISBN 978-0-97760728-0.
