= Battle of Es Sinn =

Coordinates: 32°30′20″N 45°49′00″E

- Part of the Mesopotamian campaign of World War I
Date	28 September 1915
Location	Ottoman Iraq
Result	British–Indian victory

Belligerents
British Empire: India; United Kingdom	Ottoman Empire

Commanders and leaders
(United Kingdom of Great Britain and Ireland) Charles Townshend	Nur-ud Din Pasha

Strength
6th (Poona) Division	10,500; 13 guns

Casualties and losses
Unknown	Unknown

The Battle of Es Sinn was a World War I military engagement between Anglo-Indian and Ottoman forces.

It took place on 28 September 1915, during the Mesopotamian Campaign. The sides fought to determine control of the lower Tigris and Euphrates rivers in Ottoman Iraq. The British and Indian governments also viewed it as a test of the Ottoman forces, and whether a further advance to capture Baghdad was possible. The Anglo-Indian forces of Indian Expeditionary Force D were under the command of Major-General Charles Vere Ferres Townshend, and the Ottoman forces by Colonel Nureddin.

The engagement took place just south of the town of Kut-al-Amara, along the banks of the Tigris River. Following a night march, the British and Indian troops defeated the Ottoman forces, driving them from their defensive positions along the Tigris. The capture of the Es Sinn position allowed for the capture of Kut, and with it control over the lower Tigris and Euphrates rivers, by British forces the following day.

== Background ==
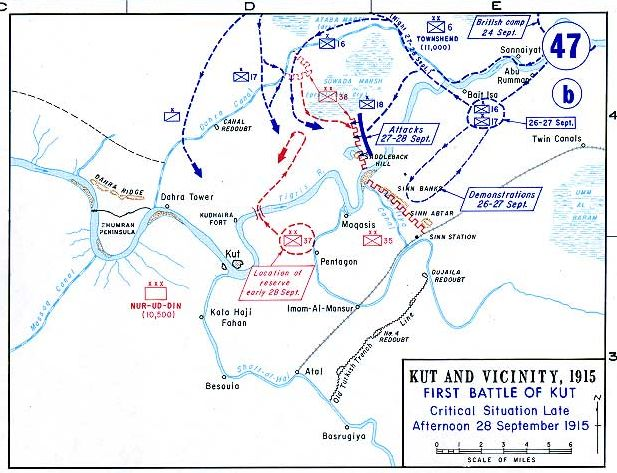
Situation at Kut on 28 September 1915.

After consolidating their hold over the Basra Vilayet, a debate began over what to do with Indian Expeditionary Force "D". While originally only envisioned as a limited campaign to secure the oil pipeline at Abadan, the success of the British and Indian troops in late 1914 and early 1915 caused the planners in Simla and in the field to re-evaluate the mission.

The British government in London wanted the campaign kept to an absolute minimum. Their primary concern was the defense of Basra and the Shatt al Arab. They had to hold those to ensure that oil from Abadan, needed to fuel the Royal Navy, would not be disrupted. The Viceroy and Indian government at Simla viewed the problem differently. They saw a chance to demonstrate that British Empire was still pre-eminent in the region, despite the stalemate on the Western Front and deteriorating situation in Gallipoli. The best way to ensure Indian security, as well as those of the Abadan oil supply was to advance at least as far as the Shatt al Hai, the canal connecting the Tigris and Euphrates River, and ideally by capturing Baghdad.

From the perspective of the Indian Army officers on the ground in Basra, it was time to strike. Their intelligence reports showed that the only troops blocking their advance upriver were the battered and demoralized remnants of the two divisions I.E.F. "D" had defeated at the battles of Nasiriyeh and Qurna. Furthermore, it was unlikely that the Ottoman divisions could expect much support from local populations. Soldiers in the Ottoman Divisions were conscripts, rarely paid and generally under-supplied. The conscripts from the Anatolian provinces were looked on as occupiers, while conscripts from the Kurdish and Arab provinces were likely to be more sympathetic to Arab or Kurdish national movements that were starting, and their morale suffered correspondingly.

While the British Government sought to keep the campaign to a minimum to conserve resources for the Western Front, control over the campaign was still vested in the Viceroy's government in Simla. The high command of I.E.F. "D" lobbied Simla for orders that allowed it to advance further north, which were approved by Secretary of State for India in London. However, Austen Chamberlain, the Secretary of State for India, warned Simla that while its actions were approved, they would have to achieve victory with forces already in theater. They could expect no reinforcements from other theatres of the war.

== Prelude ==
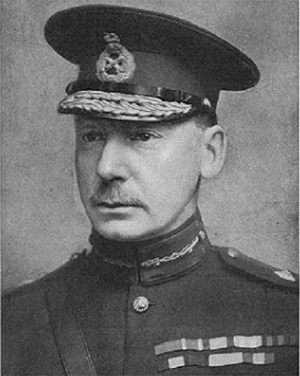
Major-General Charles V.F. Townshend, GOC 6th (Poona) Division in 1915.

Approval from higher authorities secured, the commander of Indian Expeditionary Force "D", Lieutenant General Sir John Nixon, and his principal field commander, Major-General Townshend of the 6th (Poona) Division, began putting together a plan to capture Kut. By this time, from its beginning as a reinforced brigade that had landed to protect the British oil interests, I.E.F. "D" had expanded to a force of approximately two divisions, the 6th (Poona) Division and the 12th Indian Division. In all, I.E.F. "D" six brigades of infantry and one of cavalry.

Supporting Townshend's offensive would be the combined Royal Navy/Royal Indian Marine flotilla, under the command of Lieutenant Commander Edgar C. Cookson, operating along the Tigris. During the drive to Kut, this would include the river boats Shaitan, Comet, and Sumana, as well as four horse-drawn and two motor launches. The river boats were each armed with a 12-pounder (approximately 76.2 mm), while the horse-drawn barges were equipped with 4.7 inch guns. Although Nixon now commanded the equivalent of a corps of infantry, Force D's area of responsibility had grown as well. In addition to the area around Basra, Force D now also laid claim as far north along the Tigris as Ali Gharbi, and to Nasiryeh along the Euphrates. In the absence of effective roads or any sort of a rail network, long-distance travel in the region could only be effected along the rivers. To effectively maintain control, the 12th Division broke into detachments to guard communication lines.

By 11 September 1915, Townshend had concentrated his forces at Ali Gharbi along the Tigris river. At his disposal he had the Poona Division, as well the 6th Indian Cavalry Brigade, 10th Royal Field Artillery Brigade, as well as two battalions from the 12th Division's 30th Indian Brigade. In all, Townshend's force was comprised 11,000 men and 28 artillery pieces. Townshend's force advanced along the Tigris from Ali Gharbi. Without any rail or motorized transport, they were reliant either on animal transport or river transport. Accompanying his force, Townshend was supported by a mixed riverine force manned by the Royal Navy and Royal Indian Marine. However, the transport available to him was only adequate. Despite lobbying for an advance, Nixon had refused anything that would ease Force D's logistical situation. Not only had Nixon not accepted additional logistical support, he had failed to ask for the return of animals that his predecessor had sent back to India, which were required to haul Townshend's supplies.

Preparing for the coming Anglo-Indian advance was the Ottoman Sixth Army. The Ottoman Sixth Army was composed of the remnants of 35th and 38th Divisions. Although promised reinforcements, there was no guarantee that they would arrive anytime soon due to the lack of an effective rail network. Furthermore, with the campaign at Gallipoli nearing its climax, Ottoman resources were focused there as well as fending off Imperial Russia's offensive in the Caucasus Mountains.

Not only had the 35th and 38th Divisions been gutted in the fighting early in 1915, they were undergoing a change in command. The previous commander for the Iraq Area Command, Colonel Süleyman Askeri Bey, after the defeats of Qurna and Shaiba, had killed himself while recuperating from wounds. His successor was Colonel Nureddin. A veteran of the Balkan Wars, Nureddin was charged by Enver Pasha with defending every inch of the Baghdad vilayet with an eye towards to recapturing Basra.

Despite these orders, Nureddin's resources were limited. On paper, an Ottoman division was authorized between thirty and forty thousand men. However, it was rare that an Ottoman division was ever supplied to its authorized strength. On average, Ottoman divisions could muster approximately 17,500 men. The Sixth Army's available manpower for defending against Force D totaled about 10,000 men and 32 artillery pieces. Not only were his battalions severely understrength, Nuruddin's force was composed primarily at this time of unreliable Arab conscripts.

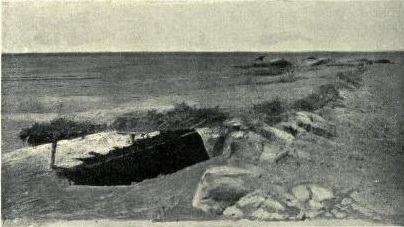
Photograph of the covered Ottoman trenches, part of the defensive network at Es Sinn along the Tigris river in 1915

Nureddin chose to set his defenses at the Es Sinn, a bend along the Tigris south of Kut al Amarra. On the north or left bank, he dug in the troops of the 38th Division in a series of two networks. Both were anchored on the Tigris River, one extended to Suwada Marsh and the other ended in Ataba Marsh. The Suwada and Ataba marshes were considered impassable swamps. Their size, even in the dry months of late summer and early autumn were thought to make them effective barriers to any large scale enveloping maneuver. To the south of the Tigris, Nureddin constructed another series of trench-works, extending from the river to a strong redoubt. Although the southern trench lines were not anchored by impassable obstacles, the position was on some of the only elevated ground around, giving it an excellent field of fire. What reserves Nureddin did have, he would retain five miles upriver. A floating bridge would allow him to shift forces rapidly, but they would have to make a five-mile march to the fighting to be of use.

== Battle ==
On 27 September 1915, Townshend's forces approached the Ottoman positions at the Es Sinn. Over the previous days, air and cavalry reconnaissance had scouted the area and located the camouflaged Ottoman defenses as best they could. Scouts had discovered that the area between the Ataba and Suwaikiya Marshes, north of the Ottoman lines, was passable for a heavy formation. Rather than attacking the position head on, Townshend opted for a complicated plan to envelop Nureddin's forces.

On the right bank of the river, Townshend deployed the two battalions of the 30th Brigade as a demonstration. Shifting the bulk of his forces across to the left bank of the Tigris, he then split his remaining troops into three elements. Two columns were to march around the marshes and attack the Ottoman positions from the rear. Column A, composed of the 2nd Dorsets, 117th Mahrattas, and a company of sappers, under the command of Brigadier General Delamain, was given the job of clearing the Ottoman positions between the Suwada and Ataba marshes. Column B, comprising the 17th (Ahmednagar) Brigade with the 20th Punjabis and 104th Wellesley's Rifles, under the command of Brigadier-General F. A. Hoghton, were assigned to strike at the rear trench line of the Ottoman positions. The third element, the 18th (Belgaum) Brigade under Brigadier General Fry, would make a demonstration along the Ottoman front, fixing the defenders in position. Brigadier General Delamain would oversee the flanking maneuver. The Cavalry Brigade would circle around and set up astride the anticipated lines of retreat on the left side of the river. However, all of this would hinge upon the Anglo-Indian forces executing a night march across the desert and around the marshes.

The entire plan almost failed before it started. At dusk on 27 September 1915, two sepoys and a havildar deserted from the Poona Division. They made their way to the Ottoman position, carrying with them the entire plan. However, Nureddin refused to believe that the British would take such a risk. Instead, he remained convinced that any attack would be delivered along the ground nearest the banks of the river.

Starting out at 2 a.m. on 28 September 1915, the two columns advanced in the darkness trying to arrive at their destinations in time to be supported by a bombardment at dawn. However, things went wrong. Houghton's column became lost and entered the Suwaikiya marsh. Attempts by Delamain to warn him of this failed and Column B spending an hour retracing its steps before getting back on track. Delamain's Column A reached its position on time, but then had to wait, in the hopes that Houghton's force would reach their jumping off point soon.

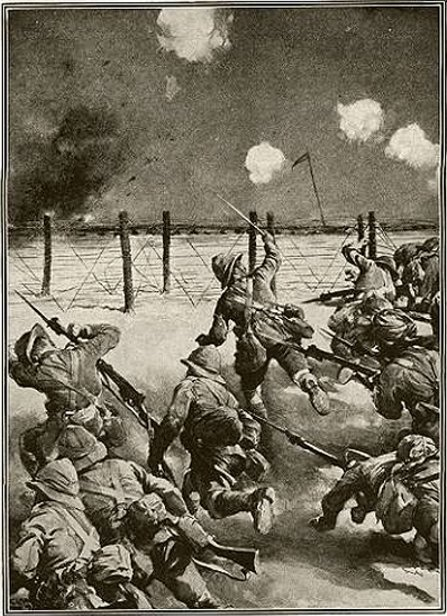
Artist's illustration in a popular war-time magazine depicting an idealized view of the attack of the Dorsets against the left flank of the Ottoman trenches on 28 September 1915. Mixed in with the Dorset figures are turbaned Sikh sepoys, despite the fact that the other unit participating in the initial attack was the non-Sikh, 117th Maharattas.

By about 8:45 a.m., almost three hours after the initial start time for the attack, Delamain still had no word that Houghton was any closer to clearing the marshes. Rather than wait any longer, he ordered his column to attack the Ottoman positions. However, without Houghton's support, Delamain's force was now supposed to attack more of the Ottoman positions than envisioned. Attacking the northern end of the Ottoman defenses, the 117th Maharattas and 22 Company of the Bombay Sappers and Miners, suffering heavy casualties. The Maharattas lost all of their British officers, leaving the battalion under the command of its Viceroy's Commissioned Officers. As the Maharattas and sappers attacked the northern end of the line, 2nd Dorsets struck at the center and southern end of the line, encountering stiff resistance.

Unknown to Delamain, Houghton's column had already been engaged, stumbling into a previously undiscovered Ottoman redoubt near the marsh. When Houghton's column finally arrived at the battle, he immediately committed his battalions to support the attacks on the redoubts. Eventually, the entire network of trenches and redoubts were cleared at bayonet point.

Receiving news of the success along the northern set of Ottoman defenses, Brigadier General Fry attempted to convert his feint into a full assault on the Ottoman positions between the river and Suwada marsh. However, the Ottoman defenders put up a stiff resistance, and the attack by the 18th Brigade bogged down. Despite the enfilading fire from the gunboats along the river, Fry's forces could not break through the Ottoman defenders. Fry sent word requesting Delamain's help. Although still engaged in clearing out the Ottoman northern positions, he shifted his forces south, trying to bring them to support Fry's brigade.

As Delamain began this maneuver, Nureddin's reinforcements began to arrive from their position upriver. Four battalions of Ottoman infantry, supported by two cavalry brigades and artillery, were racing to try to recapture the Ottoman lines. Elements of Columns A and B, both under Delamain's control now, spotted the Ottoman units first and took them under fire. Once they had stopped the Ottoman advance, Delamain ordered a bayonet charge that threw Ottoman reserves into retreat. But while dealing with the reserves, Delamain could not spare troops to help Fry's attack, which remained bogged down in front of the Ottoman trenches.

Once the operation began, Townshend was left essentially without a job. The only un-engaged infantry units were the two battalions of the 30th Brigade holding the Ottoman forces on the right bank in place with a feint. His cavalry was trying to position itself along the anticipated retreat routes along the Tigris. The only units still under his control, such as they were, was the RN/RIM flotilla. Ordering them forward, Townshend hoped that they would be able to capture the Ottoman river boats anchored in Kut, as well as the town, unsupported.

Lieutenant Commander Cookson accepted the order. Steaming up river with his gun boats, the RN/RIM units passed through the Ottoman lines under heavy fire. However, just short of Kut, they found the river blocked by a combination of sunken river boats and steel cables. Stopped by the obstruction, the Anglo-Indian riverboats attempted to cut their way through. Cookson himself, with most of his crew wounded, attempted to cut through the cables to allow the rest of his boats to pass through. However, he was shot and killed in the attempt. Cookson was awarded the Victoria Cross for his attempt.

By the end of the day, the British and Indian troops had captured most of the northern trench network on the left bank of the Tigris. With his reserves driven back, Nureddin realized that continuing to try to hold the position at the Es Sinn would result in the destruction of the 38th Division. During the night, the remnants of the 38th Division retreated back to Nureddin's headquarters. On the right bank, the 35th Division abandoned its positions on the right bank.

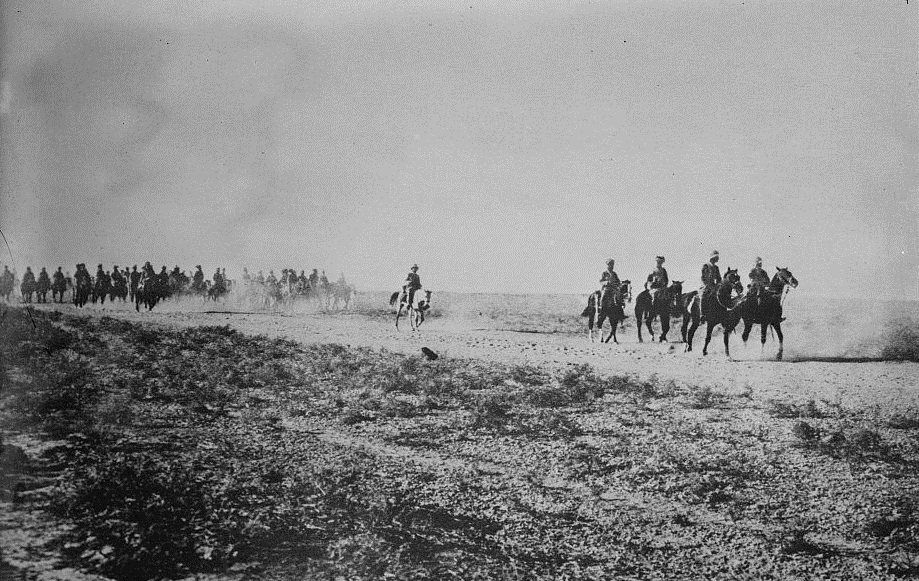
Indian Cavalry advancing in the Mesopotamian desert near the Tigris River.

Although Townshend's cavalry had reached their assigned positions, they failed to attack the retreating Ottoman forces. The commanders failed to do more than follow the beaten Ottoman forces to Kut. It was later explained that charging the Ottoman infantry would have required them to leave behind their cooking equipment and forage for their horses. The former was the more difficult problem because the 6th Cavalry Brigades regiments were made up primarily of Sikh and Hindus, both of whom would refuse to eat their food if it was cooked using local requisitioned or captured pots as their dietary laws conflicted with the native Muslim population.

== Aftermath ==
Townshend's forces held the battle field as Nureddin's Sixth Army retreated north of Kut. Eventually, Nureddin's army would stop at Ctesiphon and make preparations for another stand against the Anglo-Indian force.

As Nureddin's men fell back upriver, Townshend's forces entered Kut on 29 September 1915. The pause was necessitated for a few reasons. First, Townshend force had reached the limit of their orders once they occupied Kut. Any further advance would require permission from Simla. Second, Townshend's logistics and medical establishments were straining under the costs of his victory at the Es Sinn. These logistical and medical support issues foreshadowed problems that Force "D" and its successors suffered for the rest of 1915 and 1916.

=== Inadequacies of the medical support ===
The Poona Division's had planned on a maximum of 6 percent of the division becoming casualties. In addition to each battalion's surgeons, there were the field ambulance units assigned to each of the brigades. However, these units were not intended to function as hospitals, and were only supposed to triage and stabilize the wounded before sending them back to field hospital units. Line of communication troops had to donate their own supplies to the medical units that were overrun with casualties. With Townshend's offensive, there was only one river boat equipped as a hospital ship. With the ambulances full, many of the wounded were placed on A.T. carts, which were nothing more than simple carts pulled by animals that performed most of the land hauling at this point in the campaign. In some cases, the wounded were simply laid atop boxes of ammunition or other supplies. With animal transport limited by short-sighted decisions of Nixon and his predecessors, the Poona Division only 330 animal pulled carts and 740 animals to pull them.

=== River transport problems ===
Not only was land transport straining to meet Townshend and Nixon's demands, there was also a growing problem with the river transport. I.E.F. "D", in the absence of adequate animal transport, needed to rely on the river traffic managed by the RN/RIM flotilla. However, as the British were discovering, the Tigris was a shallow river. For the first 10 months of the campaign, this had not been a problem for two reasons. First, the distance from the front to Force "D"'s base in Basra prior to the Battle of Es Sinn had been comparatively shorter. The transit from the front to the logistical hub at Basra were manageable. Now, the Poona Division was 115 miles, and 180 miles by river, from its supply dumps at Amarrah. It was 380 miles from Basra. Second, the river had been unseasonably high, making passage of river traffic easier. For the remainder of the year, and into 1916, the river would drop, except during the spring thaws, to levels making it more difficult for many of the ships to navigate the Tigris.

=== Effect of the battle ===
Nureddin was able to extract his battered divisions. Although defeated, they had not been routed despite suffering heavy casualties. With the pause in operations, Nureddin was able to reorganize his Army. Reinforcements dispatched earlier finally began to arrive in theater. This, combined with his ability to finally draw upon other units needed to garrison the Baghdad vilayet, would allow Nureddin to mass a force capable of defeating the Force "D". Although his troops had suffered in open field combat, especially when his reserves had run into Delamain's troops while moving up to reinforce the 38th Division, they had shown themselves effective in a positional defense. At Cteshipon, he would construct another series of trenches and redoubts and wait for the British advance.

The victory at the Es Sinn was seen as proof by Nixon that Baghdad would fall easily. Despite the fact that his two divisions were stretched logistically, medically, and operationally by the advance to Kut, Nixon and his staff believed that the Ottoman forces in the region were on the verge of collapse. Townshend, however, would later write he was more hesitant about a further advance.

A three-sided debate would erupt between Chamberlain in London, the Viceroy and the Commander in Chief for India, and Nixon. The Indian government argued for an advance, conditioned on the Home Government returning the two Indian infantry divisions serving in France. The expedition's political officer, Sir Percy Cox was of the opinion that capturing Baghdad would boost the British Empire's flagging reputation in the region. Nixon was all for driving on Baghdad at any cost. Chamberlain strongly opposed any further advance. In the India Office's opinion, even if Baghdad could be captured, it was unlikely that forces in the region and those that could be transferred there in the near future could withstand an Ottoman counter-offensive.

Eventually, the question was not decided by the India Office or Simla. Prime Minister Asquith intervened, having the question referred to the Chief of the Imperial General Staff and Admiralty Naval War Staff for study. After considering the problem, the chiefs of the military services issued a report to the War Cabinet. They warned that even though Force "D" might prevail, Nixon's command had only 9,000 men available for combat. Intelligence estimates indicated that as many as 60,000 fresh troops would be arriving in the region by January at the latest. Even with this report, the Asquith government gave the approval for an advance on Baghdad, setting the stage for the Battle of Ctesiphon.

== Orders of Battle ==
Indian Expeditionary Force "D" (GOC Lieutenant General Sir John Nixon) present at Es Sinn, 28 September 1915
6th (Poona) Indian Infantry Division (GOC Major-General Charles V.F. Townshend)

Column A (16th (Poona) Brigade, GOC Brig.Gen. Delamain)	Column B (17th (Ahmednagar) Brigade reinforced, GOC Brig.Gen. Hoghton)	Column C (18th (Belgaum) Brigade, GOC Brig.Gen. Fry)	Forces On Right Bank (30th Indian Brigade, GOC Brig.Gen. C.J. Mellis)	6th Indian Cavalry Brigade
2nd bn. Dorsetshire Regiment	1st bn. Ox & Bucks	2nd bn. Norfolk Regiment	24th Punjabis	14th King's Hussars
117th Maharattas	119th Infantry (The Mooltan Regiment)	110th Mahratta Light Infantry	76th Punjabis	7th Hariana Lancers
22 Coy, Bombay Sappers and Miners	103rd Mahratta Light Infantry	120th Rajputana Infantry		33rd Queen Victoria's Own Light Cavalry
	22nd Punjabis	7th (Duke of Connaught's Own) Rajputs		
	20th Punjabis (detached from 16th Brigade)			
	104th Wellesley's Rifles (detached from 16th Brigade)			

Ottoman Sixth Army (Iraq Area Command) (Colonel Nureddin)

Right Bank	Left Bank	Reserve
38th Infantry Division (6 infantry battalions)	35th Infantry Division (6 infantry battalions)	4 battalions of infantry
		2 brigades of cavalry
