= Charles Melliss =

Recipient of the Victoria Cross

Major-General Sir Charles Melliss VC KCB KCMG
- Born: 12 September 1862; Mhow, British India
- Died: 6 June 1936 (aged 73); Brockenhurst, Kent, England
- Burial place: St. Peter's Churchyard, Frimley, Surrey
- Military career
- Allegiance: United Kingdom
- Branch: British Indian Army
- Service years: 1882–1920
- Rank: Major-General
- Units: Indian Staff Corps
- Commands: 53rd Sikhs (1906–1910)
- Conflicts: Tirah Campaign; War of the Golden Stool; First World War
- Awards: Victoria Cross; Knight Commander of the Order of the Bath; Knight Commander of the Order of St Michael and St George; Order of the Brilliant Star of Zanzibar; Croix de guerre (France)

Major-General Sir Charles John Melliss, VC, KCB, KCMG (12 September 1862 – 6 June 1936) was a British Indian Army officer of the late 19th and early 20th centuries and a recipient of the Victoria Cross, the highest award for gallantry in the face of the enemy that can be awarded to British and Commonwealth forces. A staff officer in the Mesopotamian Campaign of the First World War, he was captured after the Siege of Kut.

== Early life ==
Melliss was born in Mhow, British India, on 12 September 1862, the son of Lieutenant General George Julius Mellis of the Indian Staff Corps. He was educated at Wellington College, Berkshire and the Royal Military College, Sandhurst, being commissioned into the East Yorkshire Regiment in September 1882.

== Military career ==
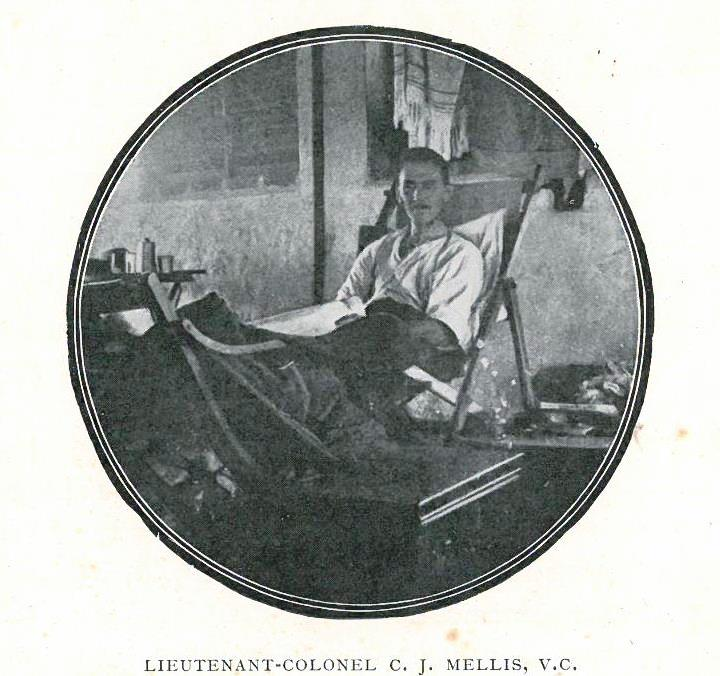
Charles John Melliss, VC, Ashanti Campaign.

Melliss transferred to the Indian Army in 1884.

He served in East Africa 1895–96 and on the North-West Frontier of India 1897–98. This was followed by operations in the Kurram Valley in Tirah 1897–98. He served with the North Nigeria Regiment in West Africa 1898–1902, and in Ashanti during 1900, including at the relief of Kumassi in the War of the Golden Stool. He was wounded four times during these operations, once severely. It was for his actions while attached to the West African Frontier Force during the Third Ashanti Expedition that Mellis was to receive the Victoria Cross. On 30 September 1900 at Obassa, Ashanti, Captain Melliss gathered together a party of men and charged into the bush at the head of them into the thick of the enemy. Although wounded in a hand-to-hand encounter, his bold rush caused panic among the enemy who were at the same time charged by the Sikhs.

Meliss was promoted major on 10 July 1901, and for the same action that won him the Victoria Cross he was also awarded the brevet rank of lieutenant colonel on the following day. He vacated his appointment as second in command of the Northern Nigeria Forces in late 1902, and reverted to the Indian Army, where he was posted to the 1st Bombay Grenadiers. The regiment served in East Africa 1902–04, where he was badly mauled by a lion in early 1903, and was invalided home in February that year. He was made a substantive lieutenant colonel in July 1906 and commanded the 53rd Sikhs (Frontier Force) 1906–10, was promoted to temporary brigadier general, and served on the North West Frontier operations (Zakka Khel) of 1908. In February 1907 he was promoted to brevet colonel and made a personal aide-de-camp to King Edward VII.

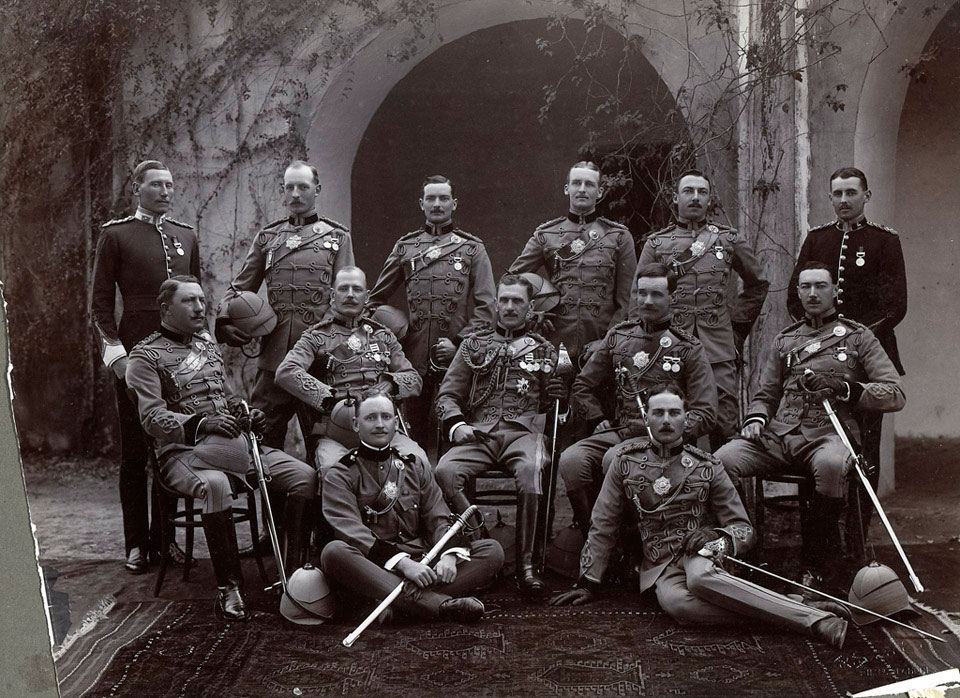
Seated in the centre, wearing his VC, is Lieutenant Colonel Charles Melliss, CO 53rd Sikhs (Frontier Force), and a group of officers, pictured here in India, sometime in 1910.

He was made a colonel on the staff and a temporary brigadier general while employed in this role in January 1910 and KIN in the 1911 Birthday Honours. His colonel's rank was made substantive from the same date. He was placed in command of a brigade, taking over from Major General James Young, in January 1912 and was promoted to major general on 19 March.

=== First World War ===
Major General Melliss was attached to the 6th (Poona) Division of the British Indian Army as it moved into what was then the Ottoman province of Basra in 1914. In April 1915, he was instrumental in the British victory at Shaiba. Melliss also fought in the Battle of Ctesiphon, the furthest up the Tigris that the 6th Division would advance.

After Ctesiphon, General Townshend, commander of the 6th Division, ordered a retreat back down the Tigris. Ottoman forces pursued the division to Kut-al-Amara, where, on 7 December 1915, Townshend ordered it to dig in and await relief. Melliss fell ill during the siege; he was in hospital when Townsend surrendered on 29 April 1916.

Transported upriver to Baghdad by steamship, Melliss remained in hospital and unable to travel as the survivors of the 6th Division were marched north toward Anatolia. When Melliss was well enough to travel, he followed the same route north. As he was a general, Melliss was allowed a travelling party and better than average supplies. Along the way, they encountered dead and dying enlisted men who had fallen behind one of the columns of British and Indian prisoners. Melliss took any survivors he found with him; at each stop he insisted that the men he had rescued from the desert be put into hospital.

Melliss spent his captivity at Broussa in northwestern Anatolia. While there, he repeatedly wrote letters to Enver Pasha detailing the sad state of the enlisted prisoners and demanding better treatment. Most of the British other ranks (1,755 out of 2,592) captured at Kut-al-Amara died in captivity.

== Later life ==
He retired from the Indian Army 24 February 1920. He was appointed colonel of his old regiment, the 53rd Sikhs, Frontier Force on 31 May 1921, a position he held until November 1934.

Melliss is buried at St. Peter's Churchyard, Frimley, Surrey, England. His VC is held by Wellington College.

== Family ==
Mellis married in 1901 Kathleen Walker, youngest daughter of General J. M. Walker.
