= 119th Infantry (The Mooltan Regiment) =

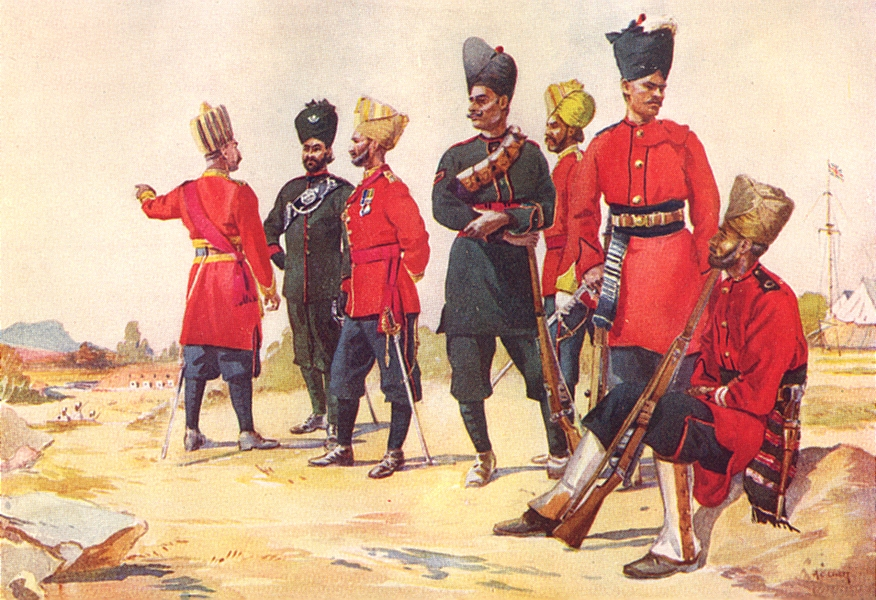
- A depiction of a subedar of the 119th Infantry (third from left) amongst other British Indian Army troops in the full dress uniforms of 1911.
- Active: 1817–1922
- Country: British India
- Branch: British Indian Army
- Type: Infantry
- Part of: Bombay Army (to 1895); Bombay Command
- Colors: Red; faced deep yellow, 1882 yellow
- Engagements: First Afghan War; Second Anglo-Sikh War; Second Afghan War; World War I

The 119th Infantry (The Mooltan Regiment) was an infantry regiment of the British Indian Army. The regiment originated in 1817, when it was raised as the 1st Battalion, 10th Regiment of Bombay Native Infantry.

The regiment's first action was in the Battle of Ghazni in the First Afghan War. After Afghanistan it took part in the Siege of Multan in the Second Anglo-Sikh War. It returned to Afghanistan in the Second Afghan War and took part in the Siege of Multan. During World War I it was attached to the 6th (Poona) Division and served in the Mesopotamian campaign. It fought in the Battle of Basra, the Battle of Qurna, the Battle of Es Sinn before suffering a setback at the Battle of Ctesiphon, after which it withdrew to Kut. Trapped in the city in the Siege of Kut the regiment was forced to surrender after 147 days. A second battalion was raised from men on leave and reinforcements, and sent to Mesopotamia.

After World War I the Indian government reformed the army moving from single-battalion to multi-battalion regiments. In 1922 the 119th Infantry (The Molten Regiment) became the 2nd (Mooltan Battalion), The 9th Jat Regiment. After independence it was one of the regiments allocated to the Indian Army.

== Predecessor names ==
- 1st Battalion, 10th Regiment of Bombay Native Infantry – 1817–1824
- 19th Regiment of Bombay Native Infantry – 1824–1885
- 19th Bombay Infantry (The Mooltan Regiment) – 1885–1903
- 119th Infantry (The Mooltan Regiment) - 1903–1922
- 2nd (Mooltan) Battalion, The 9th JAT Regiment - 1922–1947

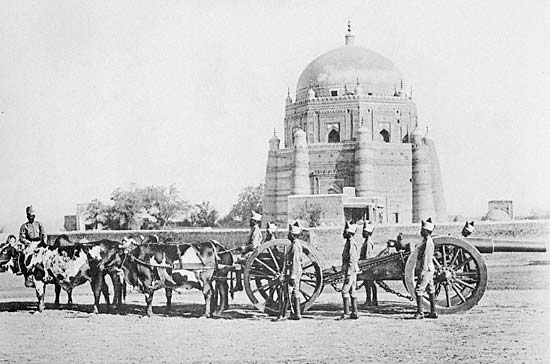
A rare photograph of the Multan regiment, circa 1895.

== Sources and further reading ==
- Barthorp, Michael; Burn, Jeffrey (1979). Indian infantry regiments 1860-1914. Osprey Publishing. ISBN 0-85045-307-0.
- Gardner, Nikolas (2004). "Sepoys and the Siege of Kut-Al-Amara, December 1915-April 1916". War in History. 11 (3): 307–326. doi:10.1191/0968344504wh302oa. S2CID 159478598.
- Moberly, Frederick James (1927) [1923]. The Campaign in Mesopotamia 1914–1918. History of the Great War Based on Official Documents. Vol. I. London: HMSO. OCLC 772784341.
- Rinaldi, Richard A (2008). Order of Battle British Army 1914. Ravi Rikhye. ISBN 978-0-9776072-8-0.
- Sharma, Gautam (1990). Valour and sacrifice: famous regiments of the Indian Army. Allied Publishers. ISBN 81-7023-140-X.
- Sumner, Ian (2001). The Indian Army 1914–1947. Osprey Publishing. ISBN 1-84176-196-6.
