= Frederick Aubrey Hoghton =

Brigadier-General Frederick Aubrey Hoghton (March 1864 – 12 April 1916) was a British Indian Army officer. He died during the Siege of Kut during the First World War, as a result of the deprivations of the siege, after being poisoned from consuming herbs that had been gathered locally for food. At the time, he was in command of the 17th Brigade.

== Biography ==
The younger son of W. A. Hoghton, ICS, Frederick Hoghton was commissioned into the East Yorkshire Regiment in 1883. He transferred to the Indian Army in 1887 (Bombay Staff Corps) and served for many years with the 1st Bombay Grenadiers. He subsequently served as second-in-command of the 74th Punjabis and commanded the 69th Punjabis.

He was promoted to colonel in November 1911 although this was antedated to October.

In 1915, he was appointed president of the Court of Inquiry investigating the mutiny in Singapore. He was then given command of the 17th (Ahmednagar) Brigade, under the 6th Indian Division. The division was cut off by the Ottoman forces at Kut in December 1915, when the Siege of Kut began. The food situation in Kut rapidly deteriorated, and men began to consume vegetation, which in turn led to many cases of poisoning. On the night of 11/12 April 1916, Hoghton, who had been in poor health, died of poisoning from consuming herbs which had been gathered locally.

He is buried at Kut War Cemetery, Iraq.
