= 117th Mahrattas =

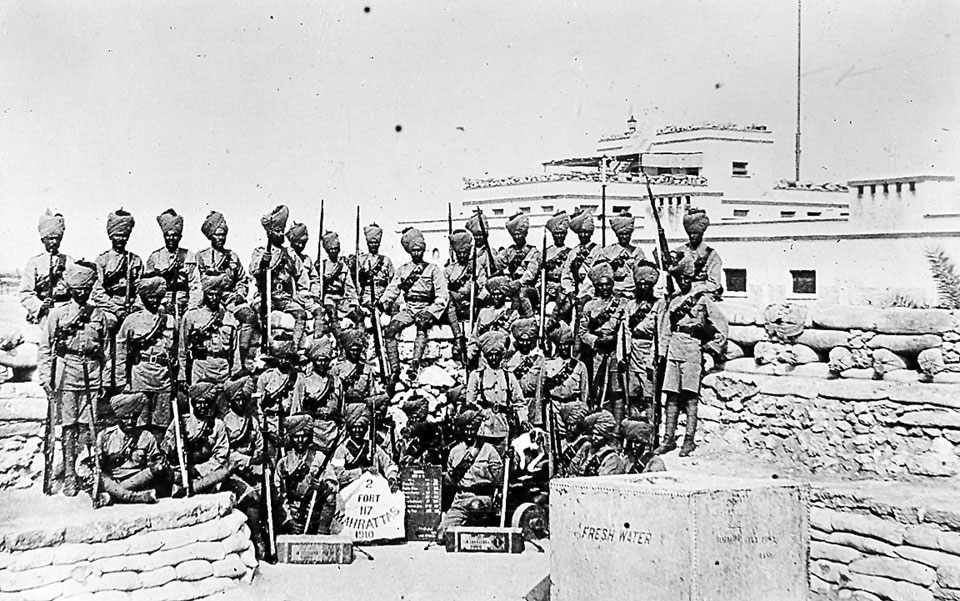
- 117th Mahrattas at a fort in the North West Frontier, India, 1909.
- Active: 1800–1922
- Country: British India
- Branch: British Indian Army
- Type: Infantry
- Part of: Bombay Army (to 1895); Bombay Command
- Colors: Red; faced pale yellow, 1882 yellow
- Engagements: World War I

The 117th Mahrattas were an infantry regiment of the British Indian Army. The regiment traces their origins to 1800, when they were raised as the Bombay Fencible Regiment.

During World War I the regiment was attached to the 6th (Poona) Division, served in the Mesopotamian campaign, and delivered a setback at the Battle of Ctesiphon in November 1915. They were forced to withdraw back to Kut, and forced to surrender after the Siege of Kut.

After World War I the Indian government reformed the army moving from single battalion regiments to multi-battalion regiments. In 1922, the 117th Mahrattas became the 5th Battalion 5th Mahratta Light Infantry. After independence they were one of the regiments allocated to the Indian Army.

== Predecessor names ==
- Bombay Fencible Regiment - 1800
- 1st Battalion, 9th Regiment of Bombay Native Infantry - 1803
- 17th Bombay Native Infantry - 1824
- 17th Bombay Infantry - 1885
- 117th Matrattas - 1903

== Sources ==
- Barthorp, Michael; Burn, Jeffrey (1979). Indian infantry regiments 1860-1914. Osprey Publishing. ISBN 0-85045-307-0.
- Rinaldi, Richard A (2008). Order of Battle British Army 1914. Ravi Rikhye. ISBN 978-0-9776072-8-0.
- Sharma, Gautam (1990). Valour and sacrifice: famous regiments of the Indian Army. Allied Publishers. ISBN 81-7023-140-X.
- Sumner, Ian (2001). The Indian Army 1914-1947. Osprey Publishing. ISBN 1-84176-196-6.
- Moberly, Frederick James (1927) [1923]. The Campaign in Mesopotamia 1914–1918. History of the Great War Based on Official Documents. Vol. I. London: HMSO. OCLC 772784341.
