= Basra War Cemetery =

British Commonwealth War Graves Commission cemetery in Basra, Iraq

Coordinates: 30°31′51″N 47°49′13″E

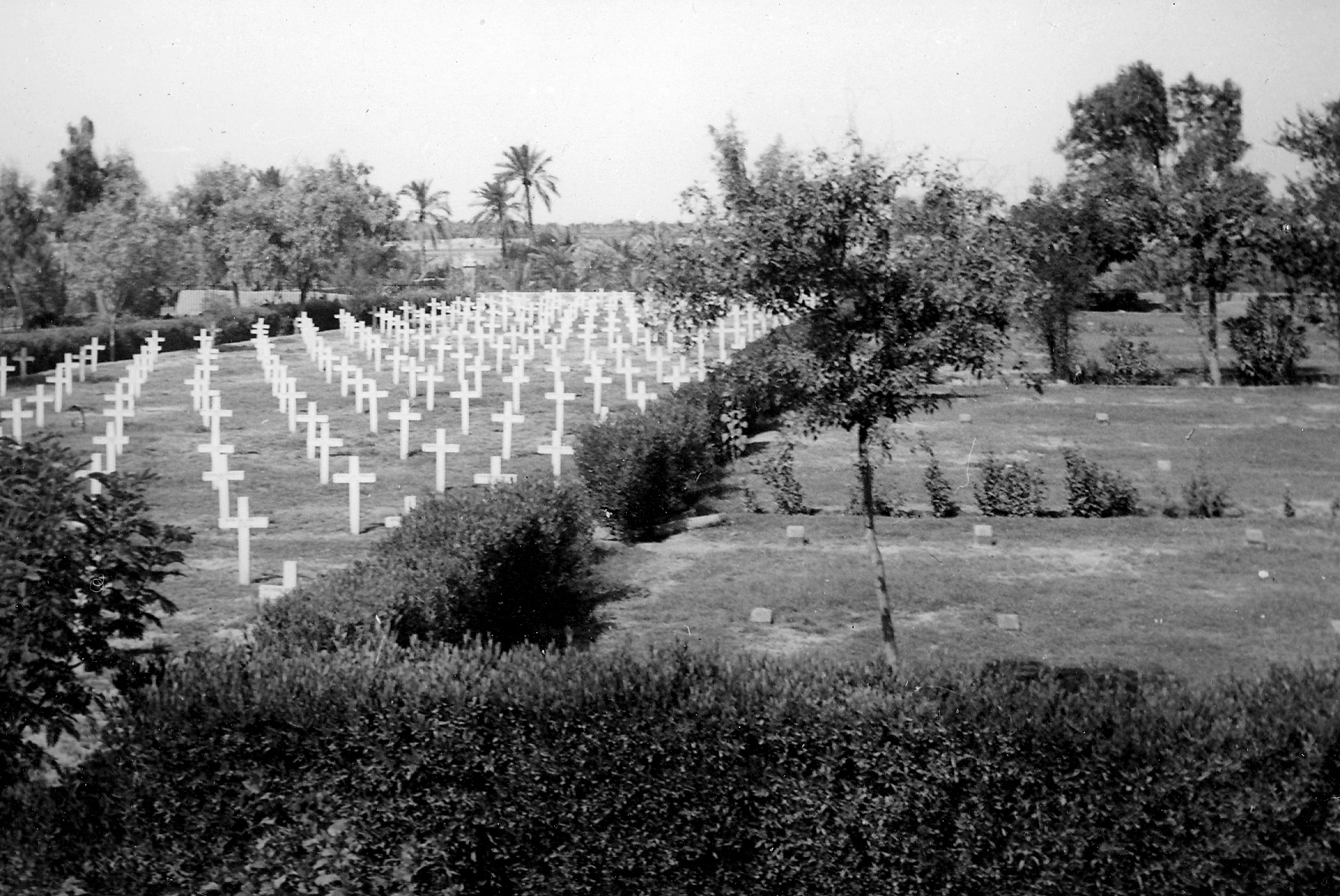
The cemetery in 1951 prior to its abandonment by CWGC, showcasing Basra Plot 7 (WW2) and Plot 6 (WW1) (CWGC Archives)

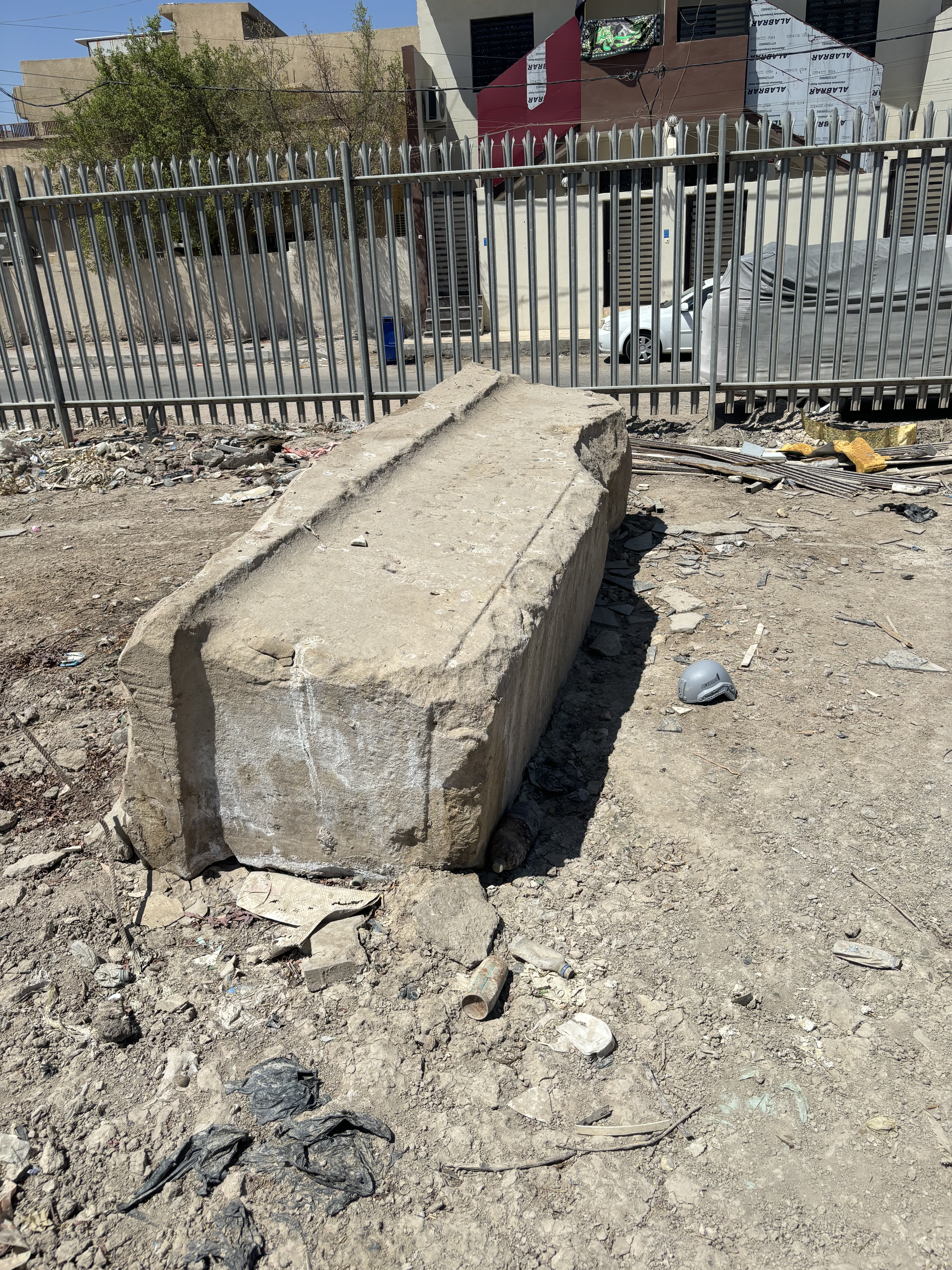
War Stone from Basra Cemetery

Basra War Cemetery is a military cemetery in Basra, Iraq. Originally a small civil cemetery, it was greatly enlarged during the First World War and contains 2,890 graves, the majority of which are Commonwealth casualties killed during the Mesopotamian campaign. The site is in very poor condition, having not been maintained or renovated by the Commonwealth War Graves Commission.

== History ==
In 1935, the site was cleared of gravestones due to their deterioration and a Memorial Screen Wall was installed with the names of the men buried there; none of these inscriptions remain. Opposite lies the Indian Forces Cemetery.

The combined cemeteries contain the remains of almost 5,000 servicemen, primarily those killed in World War I. In addition, it includes a small plot containing graves of Ottoman prisoners of war and eight Russian refugees from 1920-21. There are 364 World War II graves and a dedicated RAF cemetery.

During World War II, Basra was part of the Trans-Iranian transport route for the delivery of Lend-Lease aid to the USSR. A number of Soviet pilots killed in a plane crash on 5 May 1942 are also buried there, including commander Senior Lieutenant Alexey Nikolaevich Ivanov (section 7, row G, grave 5), and navigator Yuri Pavlovich Zaitsev (section 7, row G, grave 6).

Those buried at the cemetery include Victoria Cross recipient George Godfrey Massy Wheeler.

Clearance of memorial panels and grave stones by British Army 2003

In September 2003 soldiers from 19 Mech Bde Sig Sqn removed all the memorial panels and remaining gravestones from Basra War Cemetery for "safekeeping". 50 pallets of material were ultimately removed. The project was conceived by an Army Padre. Without any clear plan or process in place this material was crushed in April-May 2005, less than 18 months later. The resulting rubble was used as infill for a drainage ditch at Shaiba Base.

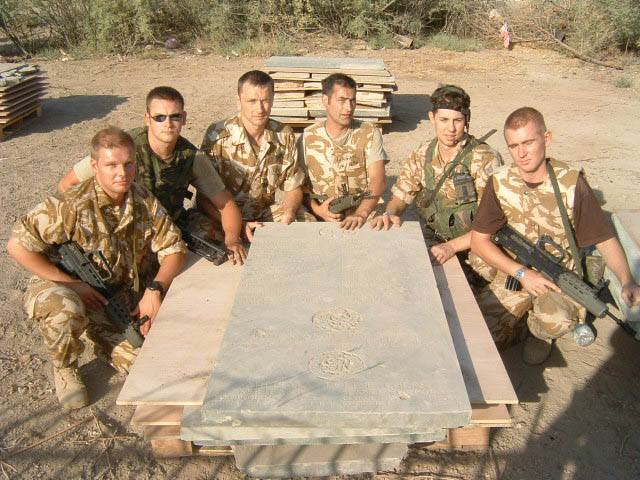

Up to now the MOD refuses to accept responsibility or accountability for the destruction of Basra Army Cemetery. A request for a Judicial Review into the matter has been made which the MOD is vigorously fighting.

The graves themselves remain undisturbed, and the sub-bases remain in place, making individual graves relatively easy to identify. As of July 2026 the CWGC has no plans to return to the country and renovate or maintain any of the cemeteries and monuments there.

A relative of a WW2 casualty buried at Basra War Cemetery visited the site in November 2025, laid a gravestone for his grandfather Gunner Joseph Soppitt and held a Remembrance Sunday service which was attended by the Archbishop of Basra.

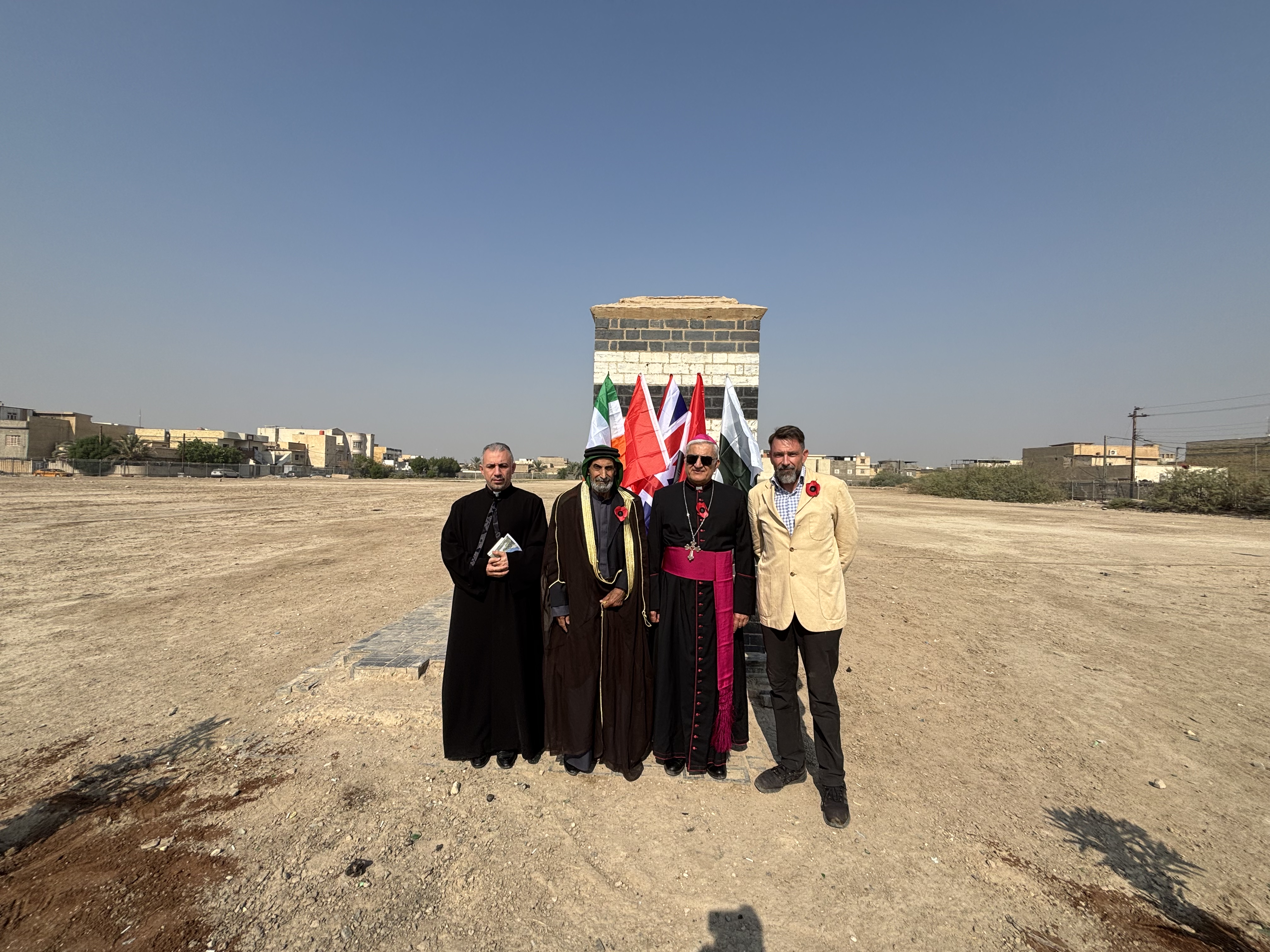
Remembrance Sunday Service November 2025

== Gallery ==
Gallery of the cemetery

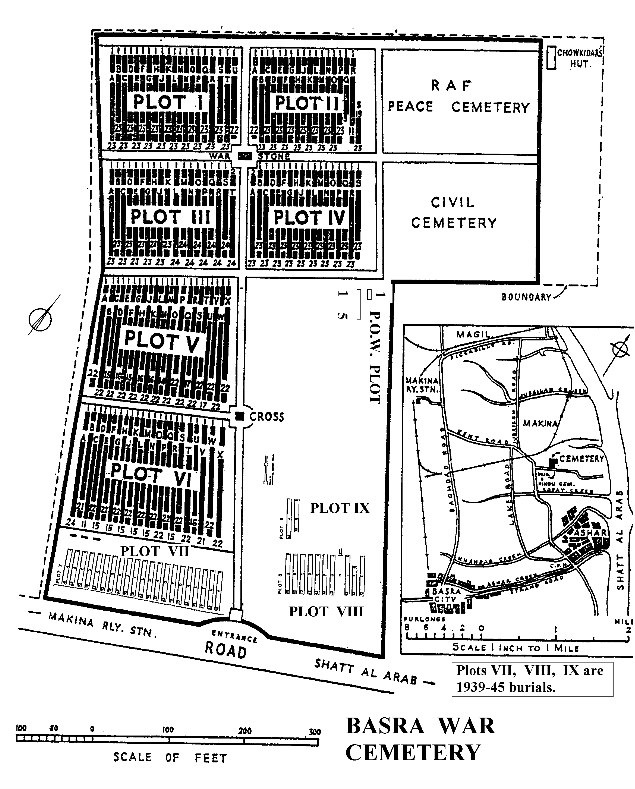
A map of the cemetery's plots.

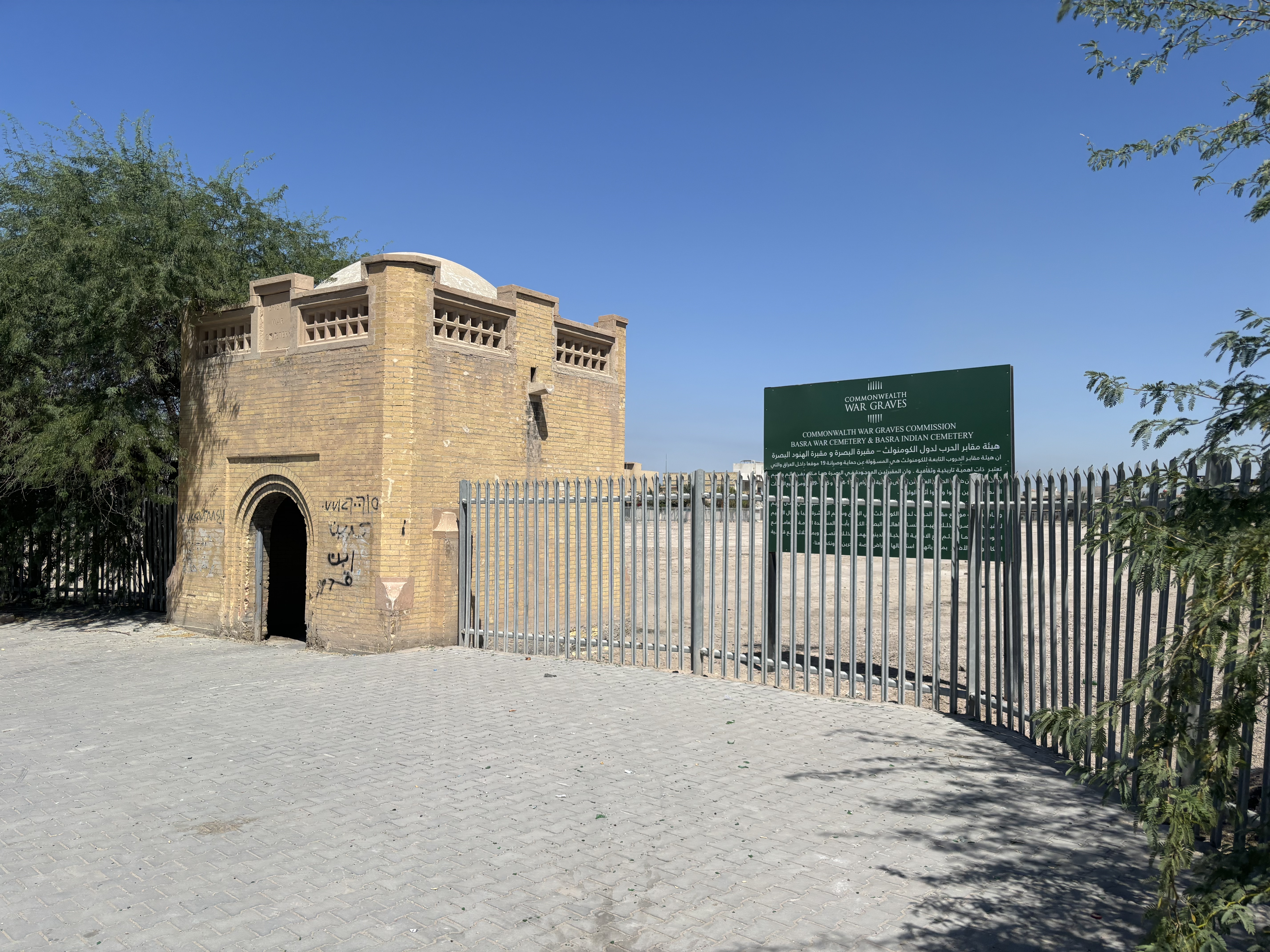
The main gate.

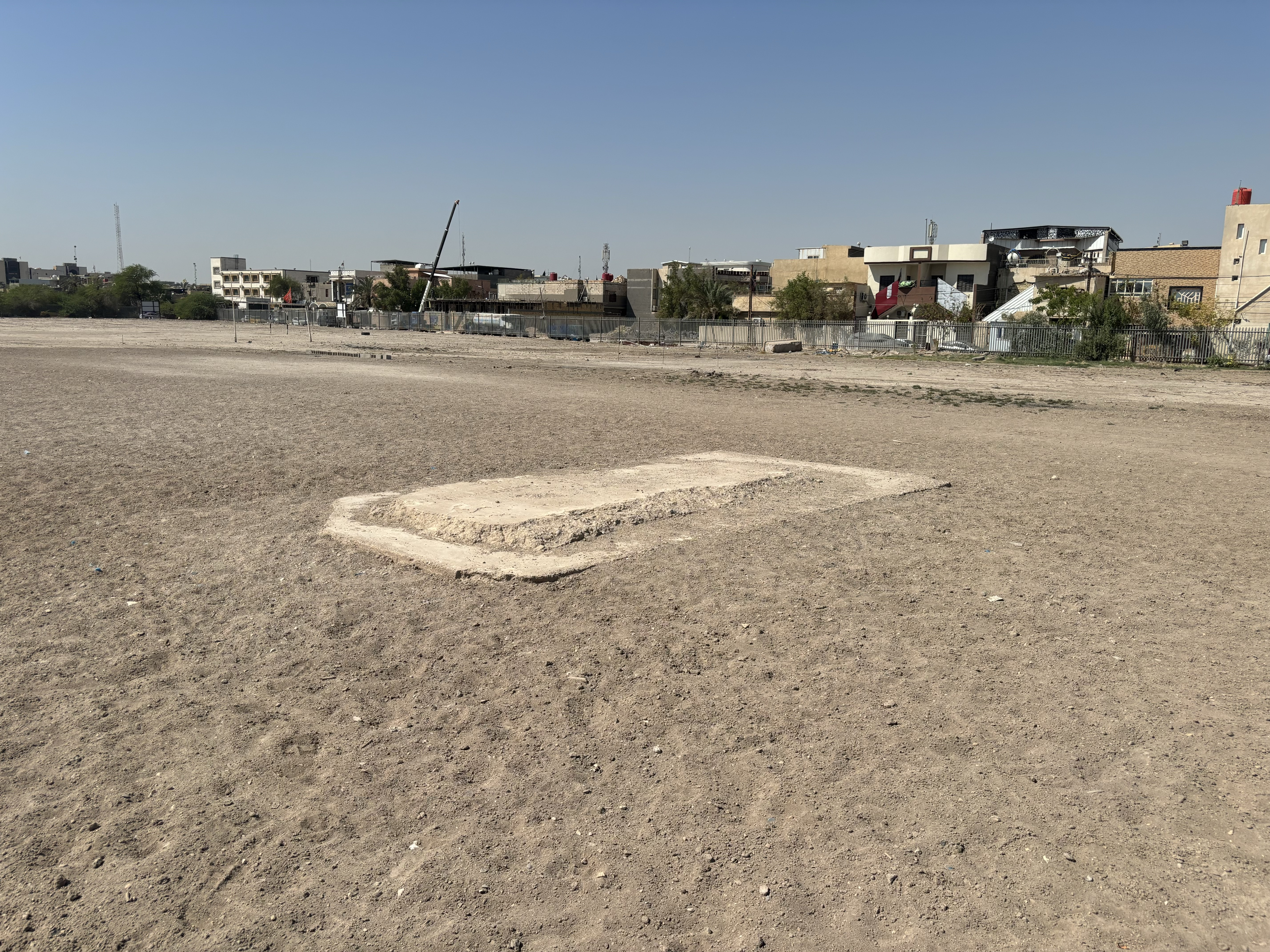
The base of the plinth from Basra War Cemetery

== See also ==
- Amara War Cemetery
- Basra Memorial
