= 104th Wellesley's Rifles =

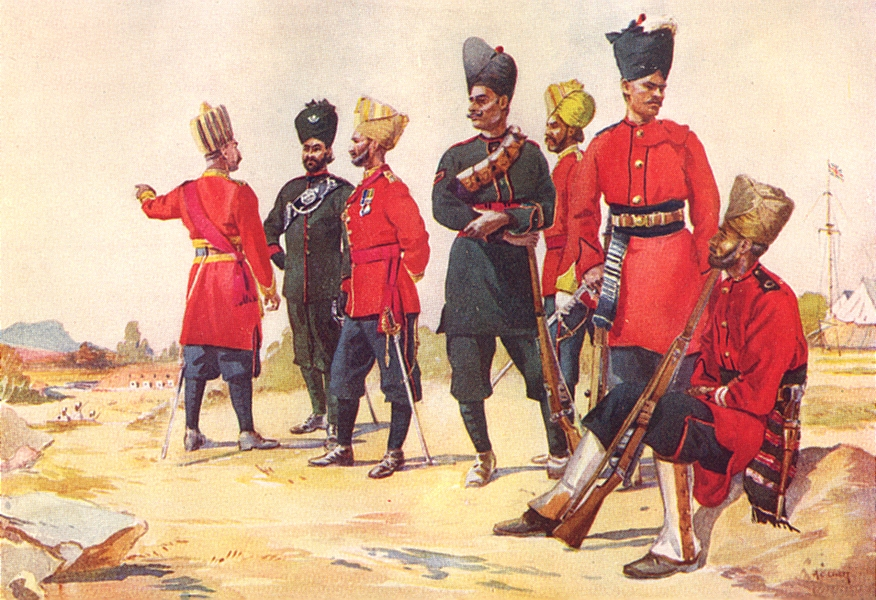
- A depiction of a subadar-major of the 104th Wellesley's Rifles (second from left) amongst other British Indian Army troops
- Active: 1775-1922
- Country: British India
- Branch: Army
- Type: Infantry
- Part of: Bombay Army (to 1895); Bombay Command
- Uniform: Green; faced red.
- Engagements: Third Anglo-Mysore War; Fourth Anglo-Mysore War; Bani Bu Ali expedition Second Anglo-Sikh War; Anglo-Persian War; Second Afghan War; Indian Rebellion of 1857; World War I: Mesopotamia Campaign; Battle of Ctesiphon; Siege of Kut

The 104th Wellesley's Rifles were an infantry regiment of the British Indian Army. They could trace their origins to 1775, when they were raised as the 5th Battalion, Bombay Sepoys and presently its designation is 3 Guards (1 Rajputana Rifles) of Indian Army.

The regiments first action was during the Mysore Campaign in the Third Anglo-Mysore War. This was followed by their participation in the Battle of Seringapatam in the Fourth Anglo-Mysore War. They were next called to serve in the Bani Bu Ali expedition in 1821, against the pirates in Eastern Arabia and the Persian Gulf region. Returning to India they took part in the Siege of Multan during the Second Anglo-Sikh War. They were next involved in the Anglo-Persian War in 1856, followed the next year by the Indian Rebellion of 1857 taking part in the Central India Campaign.

Twenty years were to pass until their next action in the Battle of Kandahar during the Second Afghan War. They were also in East Africa during the Sudan Campaign. During World War I they were in the 6th (Poona) Division during the Mesopotamia Campaign. After a string of early successes particularly during the Battle of Es Sinn, the 6th Division was defeated at the Battle of Ctesiphon in November 1915. Following this engagement, the division withdrew to Kut and Siege of Kut began. After a lengthy siege all they surrendered in April 1916.

After World War I the Indian government reformed the army moving from single battalion regiments to multi battalion regiments. In 1922, the 104th Wellesley's Rifles became the 1st Battalion 6th Rajputana Rifles. After independence they were one of the regiments allocated to the Indian Army.

== Predecessor names ==
- 5th Battalion, Bombay Sepoys - 1775
- 9th Battalion, Bombay Sepoys - 1778
- 2nd Battalion, 2nd Regiment of Bombay Native Infantry - 1796
- 4th Bombay Native Infantry - 1824
- 4th Bombay Infantry (or Rifle Corps) - 1885
- 4th (1st Battalion Rifle Corps) Bombay Infantry - 1889
- 4th Bombay Rifles - 1901
- 104th Wellesley's Rifles - 1903

== Successor Names ==
- 1st Battalion 6th Rajputana Rifles-1921
- 1st Battalion Rajputana Rifles-1945
- Allocated to India on Partition-1947
- 3rd Battalion, Brigade of the Guards(1st Rajputana Rifles)-1949
