= George Godfrey Massy Wheeler =

Recipient of the Victoria Cross

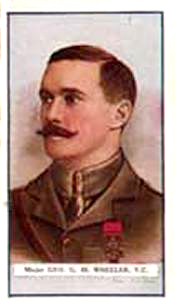
- Born: 31 January 1873; Chakrata, British India
- Died: 13 April 1915 (aged 42); Shaiba, Mesopotamia
- Burial place: Basra War Cemetery
- Relatives: Sir Hugh Massey Wheeler (grandfather)
- Military career
- Allegiance: United Kingdom
- Branch: British Indian Army
- Service years: 1893 - 1915
- Rank: Major
- Units: The Wiltshire Regiment; 7th Hariana Lancers
- Conflicts: World War I; Battle of Shaiba †
- Awards: Victoria Cross

George Godfrey Massy Wheeler, VC (31 January 1873 – 13 April 1915) was a British Army officer, and a recipient of the Victoria Cross, the highest and most prestigious award for gallantry in the face of the enemy that can be awarded to British and Commonwealth forces.

== Background and family ==
Wheeler was a grandson of Sir Hugh Massy Wheeler. He was of Anglo-Indian and Anglo-Irish descent. He was educated at Bedford Modern School. In 1900 he married Nellie Purcell, a daughter of the surgeon Ferdinand Purcell.

== Military career ==
Wheeler was commissioned a second lieutenant in the Wiltshire Regiment on 20 May 1893, and was promoted to lieutenant on 1 April 1895. He transferred to the Indian Staff Corps in 1897 where he was attached to the 7th Bengal Lancers, stationed at Faizabad. Appointed adjutant of the regiment on 25 October 1901, he was promoted to captain on 20 May 1902.

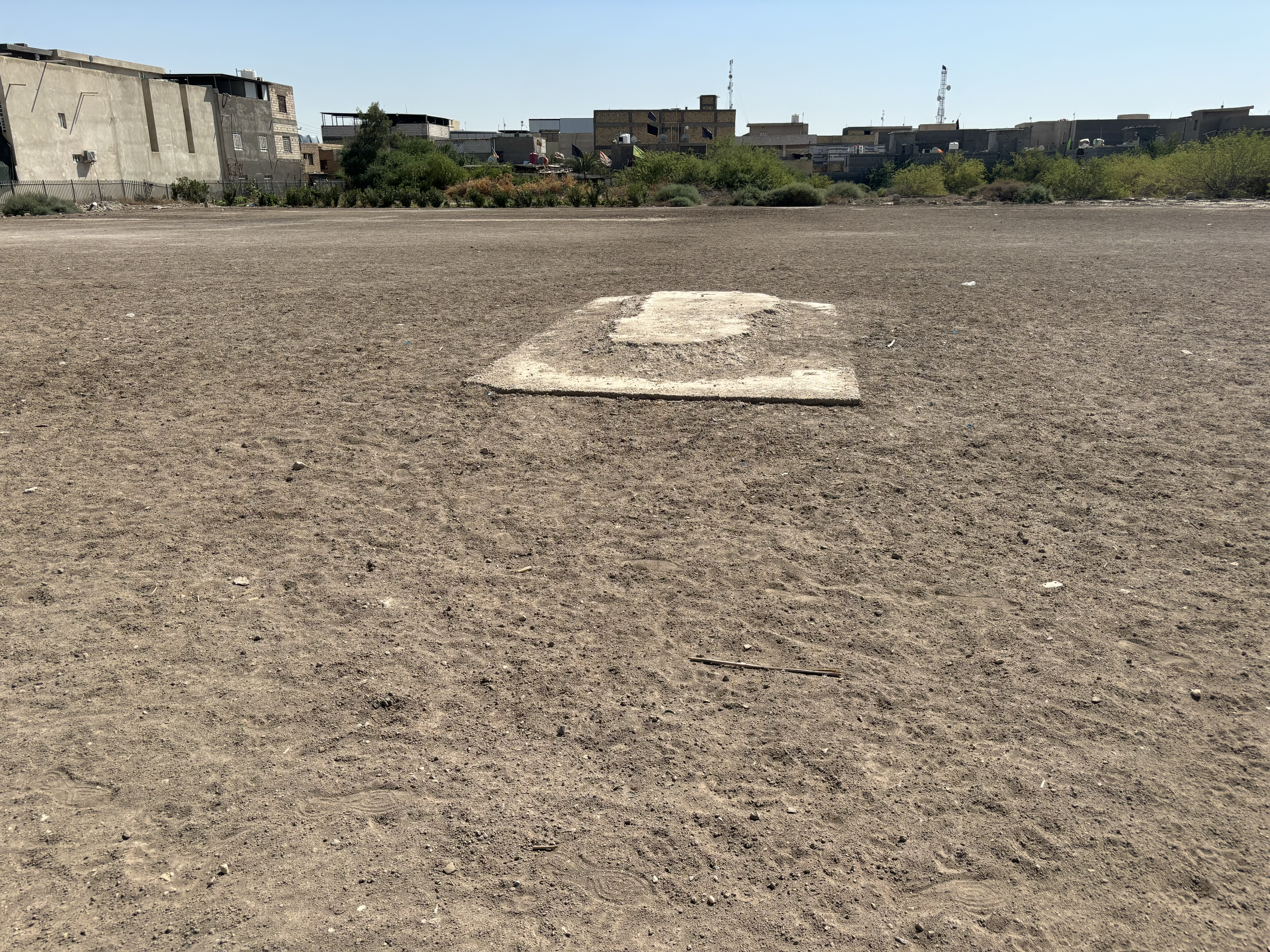
Grave Site of George Wheeler VC Basra War Cemetery

Wheeler is buried in Basra War Cemetery - Plot III. Row C. Grave 22 his grave now unmarked. His name is mentioned on the map of the cemetery as he is situated at the end of the row.

== Victoria Cross ==
He was Major in the 7th Hariana Lancers, British Indian Army, during World War I. On 12 April 1915 at Shaiba, Mesopotamia, Major Wheeler led his squadron in an attempt to capture a flag which was the centre-point of a group of the enemy who were firing on one of his troop's picquets. He advanced, attacked the enemy's infantry with the lance, and then retired while the enemy swarmed out of hidden ground where Royal Artillery guns could attack them. On 13 April Major Wheeler led his squadron to the attack of the North Mound. He was seen far ahead of his men, riding straight for the enemy's standards, but was killed in the attack. Major Wheeler was 42 years old at the time of this action, for which he was awarded the VC.
