= 7th Hariana Lancers =

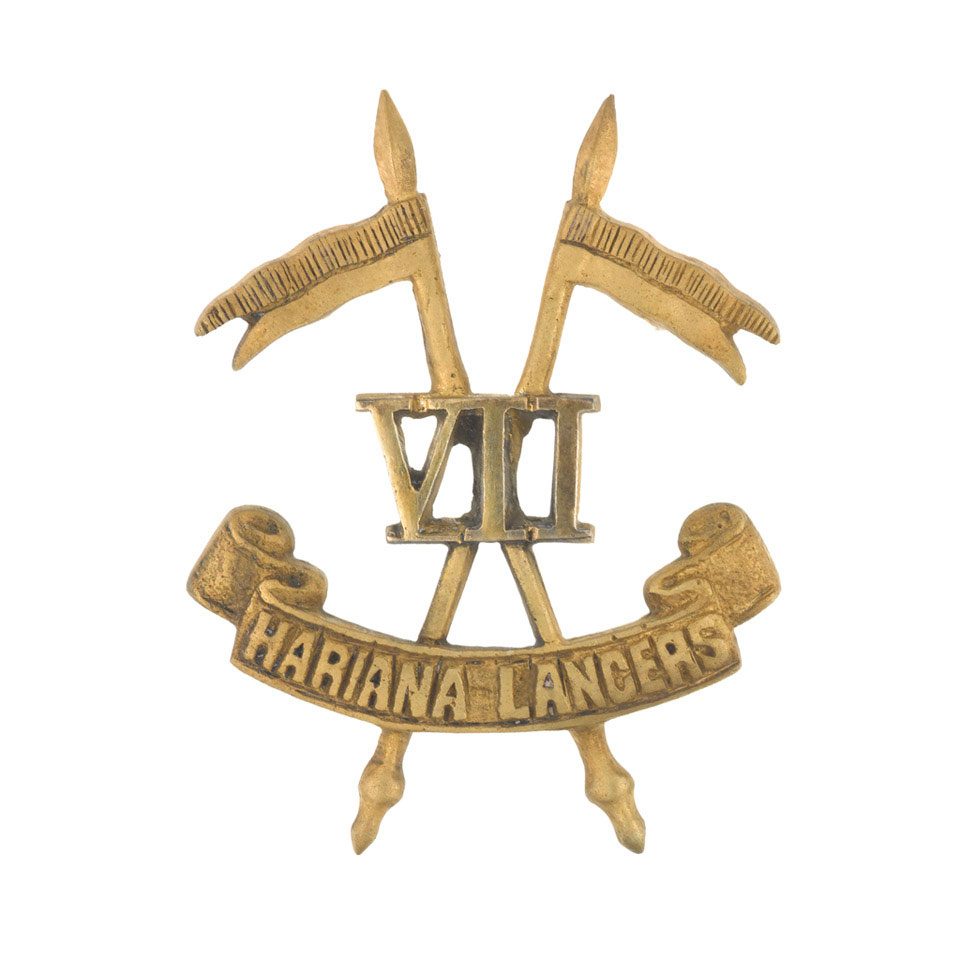
- Cap badge, 7th Hariana Lancers, 1904-1921
- Active: 1846-1921
- Country: India
- Allegiance: East India Company (1846-1858); British India (1858-1921)
- Branch: Bengal Army (1846-1895); British Indian Army (1895-1921)
- Type: Cavalry
- Size: Regiment
- Engagements: Second Anglo-Sikh War; Indian Rebellion of 1857; Third Anglo-Burmese War; Battle of Shaiba; Siege of Kut
- Battle honours: Punjab, Burma 1885-87

The 7th Hariana Lancers was a cavalry regiment in the British Indian Army. It was raised in Meerut and Cawnpore in 1846 by Captain J. Liptrott as a regiment of Bengal irregular cavalry. The regiment was amalgamated with the 6th King Edward's Own Cavalry to form the 18th King Edward's Own Cavalry.

== History ==
The regiment was raised after the First Anglo-Sikh War (1845–46) in anticipation of another conflict. During the Second Anglo-Sikh War, the regiment served as a reserve force and was not involved in any engagements.

Like all regiments of the British Indian Army, the 7th Hariana Lancers underwent numerous name changes and reorganisations. The unit was raised as the 16th Bengal Irregular Cavalry in 1846, renumbered the 17th in 1847; became the 7th Bengal Cavalry in 1861; the 7th Bengal Lancers in 1900; the 7th Lancers in 1903; and the 7th Hariana Lancers in 1904. The unit's red uniforms with dark blue facings and lace gold was changed to blue uniforms with French grey facings in 1922.

=== Indian Rebellion of 1857 ===
During the Indian Rebellion of 1857, the regiment had been stationed on the North West Frontier of British India. The regiment remained loyal to the Company rule in India. As a result of the mutiny and the re-constitution of the Bengal Army, the 8th to 16th irregular cavalry regiments were disbanded and the 17th became the 7th Bengal Cavalry.

=== Third Anglo-Burmese War ===
The regiment went to Burma in 1886 in the aftermath of the Third Anglo-Burmese War.

=== World War I ===
The regiment was stationed in the Firozpur Cantonment when World War I broke out. In 1914, the regiment consisted of one squadron of Jats, one squadron of Sikhs, one squadron of Dogras and one squadron of Hindustani Muslamans. In 1915, the regiment participated in the Mesopotamian campaign and fought at the Battle of Shaiba in defence of Basra. The regiment would lose a squadron during the Kut-Al-Amara. It returned to Bolarum in October 1916.

In December 1919 the regiment returned to Mesopotamia, landing at Basra on 31 December. It served here until July 1920 when it returned to India, returning to its depot at Risalpur on 12 July.

==== Victoria Cross ====
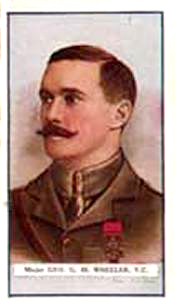
George Godfrey Massy Wheeler

Major George Godfrey Massy Wheeler was awarded the Victoria Cross for his actions during the Battle of Shaiba. On 12 April 1915. Major Wheeler led his squadron in an attempt to capture a flag which was the centre-point of a group of the enemy who were firing on one of his troop's picquets. He advanced, attacked the enemy's infantry with the lance, and then retired while the enemy swarmed out of hidden ground where Royal Artillery guns could attack them. On 13 April Major Wheeler led his squadron to the attack of the North Mound. He was seen far ahead of his men, riding straight for the enemy's standards, but was killed in the attack.

Wheeler's Victory Cross was donated to the Royal Pavilion and Museums in Brighton by his widow Nellie Purcell. In 2015, the museum found the medal while searching for items to display to mark the centenary of the start of the war.

== Battle honours ==
The regiment was awarded battle honors for Punjab and Burma 1885–87.
