= 6th (Poona) Division =

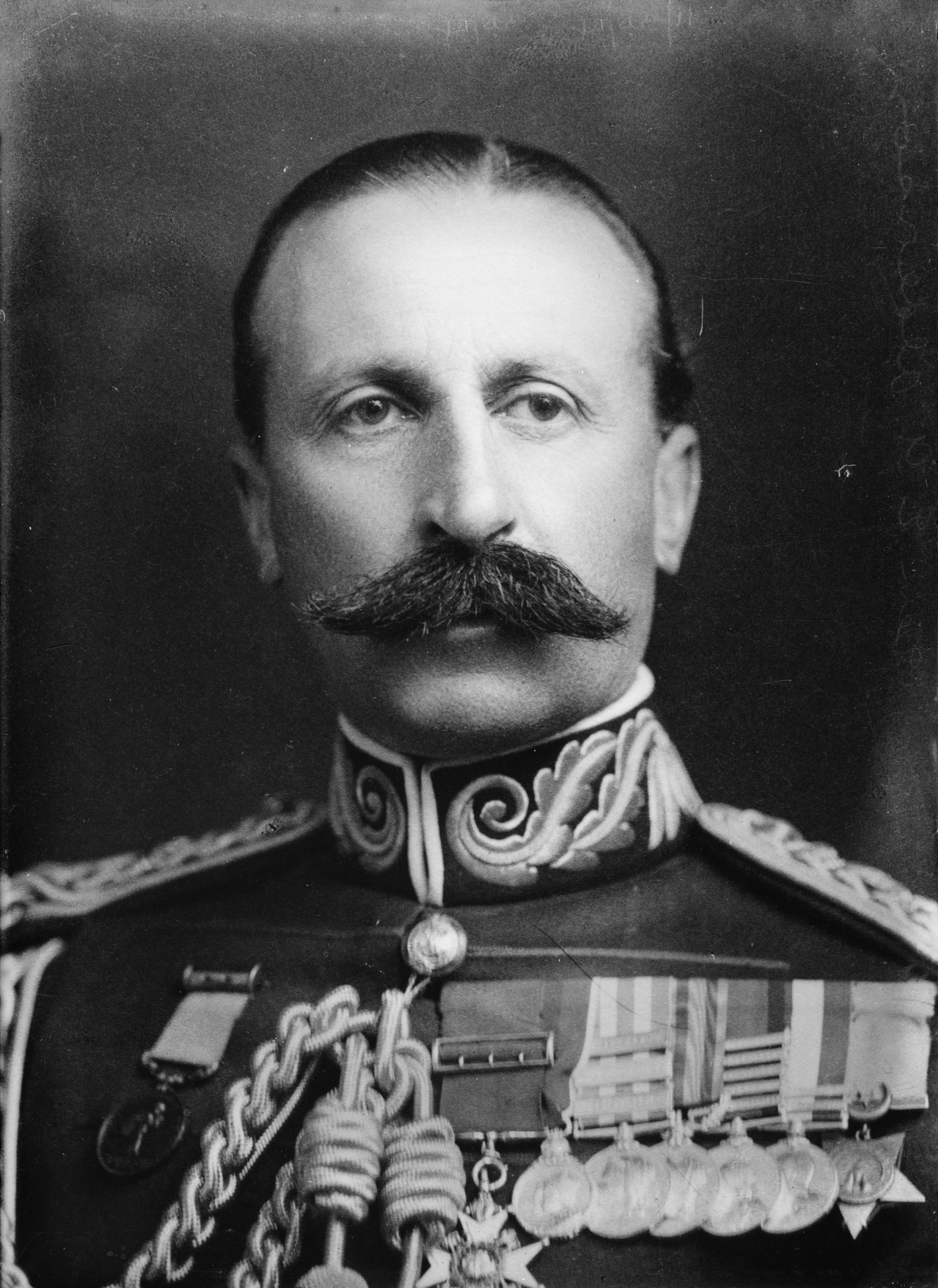
Lieutenant General Sir Edwin Alfred Hervey Alderson, commander from 1908 - 1912

The 6th (Poona) Division was a division of the British Indian Army. It was formed in 1903, following the Kitchener reforms of the Indian Army.

== World War I ==
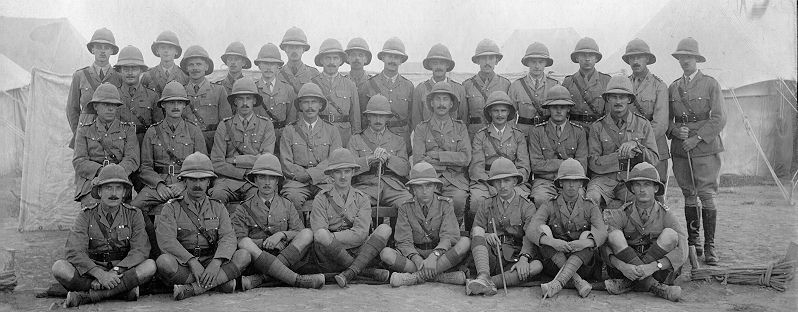
Officers of the 2nd Battalion, Norfolk Regiment, pictured here in Mesopotamia between 1914 and 1918.

The 6th (Poona) Division served in the Mesopotamian campaign. Led by Major General Barrett then Major General Townshend, the division were the first British Indian troops to land in Mesopotamia in November 1914 at the Fao Landing.

After a string of early successes, the 6th Division was delivered a setback at the Battle of Ctesiphon in November 1915. Following this engagement, the division withdrew back to Kut, where Townshend made the decision to hold the city. After a lengthy siege by the Ottomans, Townshend surrendered on 29 April 1916. 10,061 troops and 3,248 followers were taken captive.

Following the surrender, the officers and the N.C.O. and men of the garrison were separated, and the N.C.O.'s and men were forced marched to Anatolia. The suffering of the enlisted soldiers was particularly egregious, and over 4,000 died in captivity.

After the surrender, the Poona Division ceased to exist until another 6th Division was raised in 1920 for the Iraq Rebellion.

== Order of Battle December 1914 ==
- 16th (Poona) Brigade
  - 2nd Bn. Dorsetshire Regiment
  - 1st Bn. 20th Duke of Cambridge's Own Infantry (Brownlow's Punjabis)
  - 1st Bn. 104th Wellesley's Rifles
  - 1st Bn. 117th Mahrattas
- 17th (Ahmednagar) Brigade
  - 1st Bn. Ox & Bucks
  - 1st Bn. 119th Infantry (The Mooltan Regiment)
  - 1st Bn. 103rd Mahratta Light Infantry
  - 1st Bn. 22nd Punjabis
- 18th (Belgaum) Brigade
  - 2nd Bn. Norfolk Regiment
  - 1st Bn. 110th Mahratta Light Infantry
  - 1st Bn. 120th Rajputana Infantry
  - 1st Bn. 7th (Duke of Connaught's Own) Rajputs
- Divisional Artillery
  - X Brigade, Royal Field Artillery (RFA)
    - 76 Bty. RFA
    - 82 Bty. RFA
    - 63 Bty. RFA
  - 1st Indian Mountain Artillery Brigade
    - 23rd (Peshawar) Mountain Battery (Frontier Force)
    - 30th Mountain Battery
  - 1/5th Hampshire Howitzer Battery, RFA (Territorial Force)
- Divisional troops
  - 33rd Queen Victoria's Own Light Cavalry
  - 17 Co. 3rd Sappers and Miners
  - 22 Co. 3rd Sappers and Miners
  - 48th Pioneers

== Divisional Commanders ==
This list is incomplete.

- 1908-1912: Major-General Edwin Alderson CB
- 1912-1915: Major-General Sir Arthur Barrett KCB KCVO
- 1915-1916: Major-General Charles Townshend CB DSO

== See also ==
- List of Indian divisions in World War I

== Bibliography ==
- Gardner, Nikolas (July 2004). "Sepoys and the Siege of Kut-Al-Amara, December 1915-April 1916". War in History. 11 (3). doi:10.1191/0968344504wh302oa.
- Haythornthwaite, Philip J. (1996). The World War One Source Book. London: Arms and Armour Press. ISBN 1-85409-351-7.
- Perry, F.W. (1993). Order of Battle of Divisions Part 5B. Indian Army Divisions. Newport: Ray Westlake Military Books. ISBN 1-871167-23-X.
