= Sub-units of the Frontier Force Regiment =

Regiment of the Pakistan Army

The Frontier Force Regiment of the Pakistan Army consists of battalions with their own history. Most were formed after independence, but some are much older.

They are known as Piffers in reference to the former Punjab Irregular Force (PIF) formed by the British in 1851. The PIF consisted of five regiments of cavalry, eleven regiments of infantry and five batteries of artillery besides the Corps of Guides. Their mission was to maintain order on the Punjab Frontier. Most of them were allotted to Pakistan at the time of the independence of Pakistan. Only the 5th Gorkha Rifles (Frontier Force), and the 2nd Derajat and 4th (Hazara) Mountain Batteries went to India. The present Piffers include the Frontier Force Regiment, seven armoured regiments and The First (SP) Medium Regiment Artillery of Pakistan Army.

== Frontier Force Regiment Battalions ==
Since formation in 1956, the battalions have been known officially by their ordinal number followed by the legend "FF". However, since many of the original fifteen battalions were from prior regiments, they were raised under different names, which are indicated. In some cases the battalion may be better known by the original name or nickname. 2 FF for instance is known better as "Guides Infantry" after the fact it was drawn from the infantry component of the Corps of Guides when that unit was disbanded. 11 FF was “1 Pathan” and members of 15 FF, still call their battalion, "2 Pathan" which was the designation the battalion had as a unit of the Pathan Regiment.

PIFFER Units
Unit	Raised As	Raising Day	Place of Raising	Raised by	Motto
1 FF (Garbar Unath)(MIB)	Scinde Camel Corps	December 1, 1843	Karachi	Lt Robert Fitz Gerald	Ready Aye Ready
2 FF(MIB)	Corps of Guides	December 14, 1846	Mardan	Lt Harry Burnett Lumsden	Rough & Ready
3 FF (MIB)	1st Regiment of Infantry, the Frontier Brigade / 1st Sikh Local Infantry	December 10, 1846	Hoshiarpur	Capt J S Hodgson	Ekwanja
4 FF(MIB)	2nd Regiment of Infantry, the Frontier Brigade / 2nd (Hill Regiment) Sikh Local Infantry	December 22, 1846	Kangra	Capt James William Stephen	Tunpur Bawanja
5 FF	3rd Regiment of Infantry, the Frontier Brigade / 3rd Sikh Local Infantry	January 1, 1847	Ferozpur	Capt F Winter	Tirwanja
6 FF	4th Regiment of Infantry, the Frontier Brigade / 4th Sikh Local Infantry	December 14, 1846	Ludhiana	Capt Colin Mackenzie	Shabbir's Battalion, Chor Charwanja
7 FF(MIB)	1st Punjab Infantry (Coke Paltan)	May 18, 1849	Peshawar	Capt John Coke	Chattak Pachwanja
8 FF (Bhaiband)(MIB)	2nd Punjab Infantry, 56 Frontier Force Rifles, 2/13 Frontier Force Rifles. (Johnston Ki Paltan)	April 2, 1849	Mianwali	Lt J. C. Johnston	Bhaiband Chhewanjah
9 FF(MIB)	4th Punjab Infantry (Denniss Ki Paltan)	April 19, 1849	Lahore	Capt George Gladwin Denniss	Barhe Challo, Sust Satwanja
10 FF (Dastoori 58)(MIB)	5th Punjab Infantry (Vaughan Ki Paltan)	March 1, 1849	Layyah	Capt James Eardley Gastrell	Fattah Ya Shahadat
11 FF (MIB)	11th Territorial Bn 12th Frontier Force Regiment	March 11, 1922	Nowshera	Sir John Loader Meffay	Fast & Furious
12 FF	11th Territorial Bn 13th Frontier Force Rifles	March 12, 1922	Campbellpore	Lt Sher Muhammad	Warriors
13 FF(MIB)	8th Bn 12th Frontier Force Regiment	April 1, 1941	Bareilly	Lt Col J. E. Redding	
14 FF(MIB)	9th Bn 12th Frontier Force Regiment	April 1, 1941	Jhansi	Lt Col J. A. Blood	NAUBARA
15 FF(MIB)	14th Bn 13th Frontier Force Rifles	April 1, 1941	Jhansi	Lt Col A. Felix Williams	Fighting Fifteen
16 FF	16th Bn Frontier Force Regiment	September 12, 1965	Abbottabad	Lt Lt Col Qazi Abdul Majid Khan	
17 FF	17th Bn Frontier Force Regiment	September 12, 1965	Abbottabad	Lt Col Iftikhar Ahmed Rana	Aik Saath
18 FF	18th Bn Frontier Force Regiment	September 19, 1965	Abbottabad	Lt Col Ghous Muhammad Malik	Old and Bold
19 FF	19th Bn Frontier Force Regiment	September 26, 1965	Abbottabad	Lt Col Muhammad Ayub Afridi	PIFFER Tigers
20 FF(MIB)	20th Bn Frontier Force Regiment	October 1, 1965	Abbottabad	Lt Col Anwar ul Haq	Tayyar Har Dam Tayyar
21 FF	21st Bn Frontier Force Regiment	October 1, 1965	Abbottabad	Lt Col Nur ul Haq	Khail Ullah's
22 FF	22nd Bn Frontier Force Regiment	October 23, 1965	Shinkiari	Lt Col Tariq Muhammad Mir	Janbaz
23 FF	23rd Bn Frontier Force Regiment	October 25, 1965	Abbottabad	Lt Col Mir Ijaz Mehmood (SJ)	Jarrar
24 FF	24th Bn Frontier Force Regiment	November 22, 1965	Abbottabad	Lt Col Muhammad Akbar Khan	Al Badar
25 FF	25th Bn Frontier Force Regiment	November 22, 1965	Abbottabad	Lt Col Muhammad Safdar Iqbal	Lajawab
26 FF(MIB)	26th Bn Frontier Force Regiment	November 22, 1965	Abbottabad	Lt Col Abdullah Saeed	Khaara Shagaaf
27 FF	27th Bn Frontier Force Regiment	January 22, 1966	Abbottabad	Lt Col Luqman Mehmood	
28 FF	28th Bn Frontier Force Regiment	February 23, 1966	Abbottabad	Lt Col Hayat Ullah	God and Our Bayonets
29 FF(MIB)	29th Bn Frontier Force Regiment	November 30, 1966	Abbottabad	Lt Col Ghulam Hussain	ZARB-E-HADEED
30 FF(MIB)	30th Bn Frontier Force Regiment	April 10, 1969	Abbottabad	Major Abdul Shakoor Jan (SJ)	Dhulloi Tigers
31 FF	31st Bn Frontier Force Regiment	October 15, 1970	Lahore	Lt Col Jahan Gul	Karrar
32 FF	32nd Bn Frontier Force Regiment	April 1, 1971	Abbottabad	Lt Col Rahmatullah Khan	Al Jannisar
33 FF	33rd Bn Frontier Force Regiment	April 8, 1971	Abbottabad	Lt Col Feroz Alam Khan	Chhamb Battalion
34 FF	34th Bn Frontier Force Regiment	April 1, 1971	Abbottabad	Lt Col Khalid Manzoor Khan	Raiders
35 FF	35th Bn Frontier Force Regiment	April 19, 1971	Abbottabad	Lt Col Muhammad Akram Raja (HJ)	Charging Bulls
36 FF(MIB)	36th Bn Frontier Force Regiment	April 19, 1971	Abbottabad	Lt Col Murad Khan Nayyar	Volunteers
37 FF	37th Bn Frontier Force Regiment	April 10, 1971	Abbottabad	Lt Col C. K. Shinwari	Al Barq
38 FF	38th Bn Frontier Force Regiment	April 28, 1971	Abbottabad	Lt Col Saeed Ullah Khan	Sangi
39 FF	39th Bn Frontier Force Regiment	October 11, 1971	Abbottabad	Lt Col Ijaz Ahmed	Fit & Fine
40 FF	40th Bn Frontier Force Regiment	October 11, 1971	Abbottabad	Lt Col Imran Ullah Khan	shooter's
41 FF	41st Bn Frontier Force Regiment	December 6, 1971	Abbottabad	Lt Col Muhammad Akram	Zarb-e-Haider
42 FF	42nd Bn Frontier Force Regiment	December 7, 1971	Abbottabad	Lt Col Muhammad Iqbal	Zulfikaar
43 FF	43rd Bn Frontier Force Regiment	December 9, 1971	Abbottabad	Lt Col Muhammad Ajmal	Allah Hoo
44 FF	44th Bn Frontier Force Regiment	March 1, 1972	Karachi	Lt Col Z. S. Usmani	Fighting Four
45 FF	45th Bn Frontier Force Regiment	February 15, 1983	Havelian	Lt Col Muhammad Mohsin	Saf Shikan
46 FF	46th Bn Frontier Force Regiment	September 1, 1983	Abbottabad	Lt Col Khan Adeeb Ahmed Umarzai	Sher-E-Yazdan
47 FF	47th Bn Frontier Force Regiment	March 9, 1985	Havelian	Lt Col Javed Iqbal Khan	Jeedar
48 FF	48th Bn Frontier Force Regiment	April 11, 1985	Abbottabad	Lt Col Muhammad Arif Bangash	Paish Rau
49 FF	49th Bn Frontier Force Regiment	April 9, 1988	Kohat	Lt Col Abdul Rashid Malik	Farz Shanas
63 FF(MIB)	53rd Bn Frontier Force Regiment	January 10, 1991	Abbottabad	Lt Col Hikmatullah Khan Khattak	TRAITH TARWANJA - SHAIR KA PANJA
64 FF (Churanja Chaunth)	54th Bn Frontier Force Regiment	April 2, 1994	Quetta	Lt Col Rashid Ali Bangash	"ZABARDAST"
65 FF	55th Bn Frontier Force Regiment	March 30, 1994	Malakand	Lt Col Inayat Ullah Khan Niazi	Har Dam Taza Dam
66 FF	66th Bn Frontier Force Regiment	2015	Abbottabad		Audacious "One Bullet One Foe "
67 FF(MIB)	67th Bn Frontier Force Regiment	2015	Karachi		Muktasar
68 FF (MIB)	68th Bn Frontier Force Regiment	2018			
69 FF	69th Bn Frontier Force Regiment		Rahim Yar Khan	Lt Col Shahbaz	
70 FF	70th Bn Frontier Force Regiment				

== Affiliated units ==
These units are separate from but linked to the Frontier Force Regiment.

Unit	Raising Day	Place of Raising	Raised by	Motto
Guides Cavalry	December 14, 1846	Peshawar	Lt H. B. Lumsden	
11 Cavalry (FF)	May 18, 1849	Peshawar	Lt H. D. Daly	
12 Cavalry (FF)	April 15, 1849	Lahore	Lt S. J. Browne	
23 Cavalry (FF)	June 4, 1962	Kharian	Lt Col Ghulam Muhammad Khan	
24 Cavalry (FF)	June 7, 1962	Lahore	Lt Col Muhammad Afzal Khan	Charging 24
25 Cavalry (FF)	June 9, 1962	Kharian	Lt Col Nisar Ahmad Khan	Men of Steel
41 Horse (FF)	October 24, 1982	Kharian	Lt Col Zia ul Ghaffar	
The First (SP) Medium Regiment, Artillery (FF)	April 10, 1826	Peshawar/Bannu	Capt Brougham / Lt Hammond	Pur Azam Ba Waqar
9 Light Commando Battalion (FF)				

== See also ==
- Punjab Irregular Force
- Frontier Force Regiment
