= Bengal Army =

Army of the Bengal Presidency of British India

- Active: 1756–1895 (as the Bengal Army); 1895–1908 (as the Bengal Command of the British Indian Army)
- Country: (East India Company) Company-ruled India; British India
- Allegiance: East India Company (1756–1895); British India (1895–1908)
- Type: Command
- Size: 105,000 (1876)
- Part of: Presidency armies
- Garrison/HQ: Nainital, Nainital district (1895–1908)

The Bengal Army was the army of the Bengal Presidency, one of the three presidencies of British India within the British Empire.

It was formed in 1756 and underwent various re-organisations, including the creation of irregular infantry and cavalry regiments during the 1840s. It was originally recruited from high-caste Hindus but more diversity was introduced after 1857.

The presidency armies, like the presidencies themselves, belonged to the East India Company (EIC) until the Government of India Act 1858, passed in the aftermath of the Indian Rebellion of 1857, transferred all three presidencies to the direct authority of the British Crown. In 1895 the three presidency armies were merged into the British Indian Army.

== History ==
=== Origins ===
The Bengal Army originated with the establishment of a European Regiment in 1756. While the East India Company had previously maintained a small force of Dutch and Eurasian mercenaries in Bengal, this was destroyed when Calcutta was captured by the Nawab of Bengal on 30 June that year.

=== East India Company ===
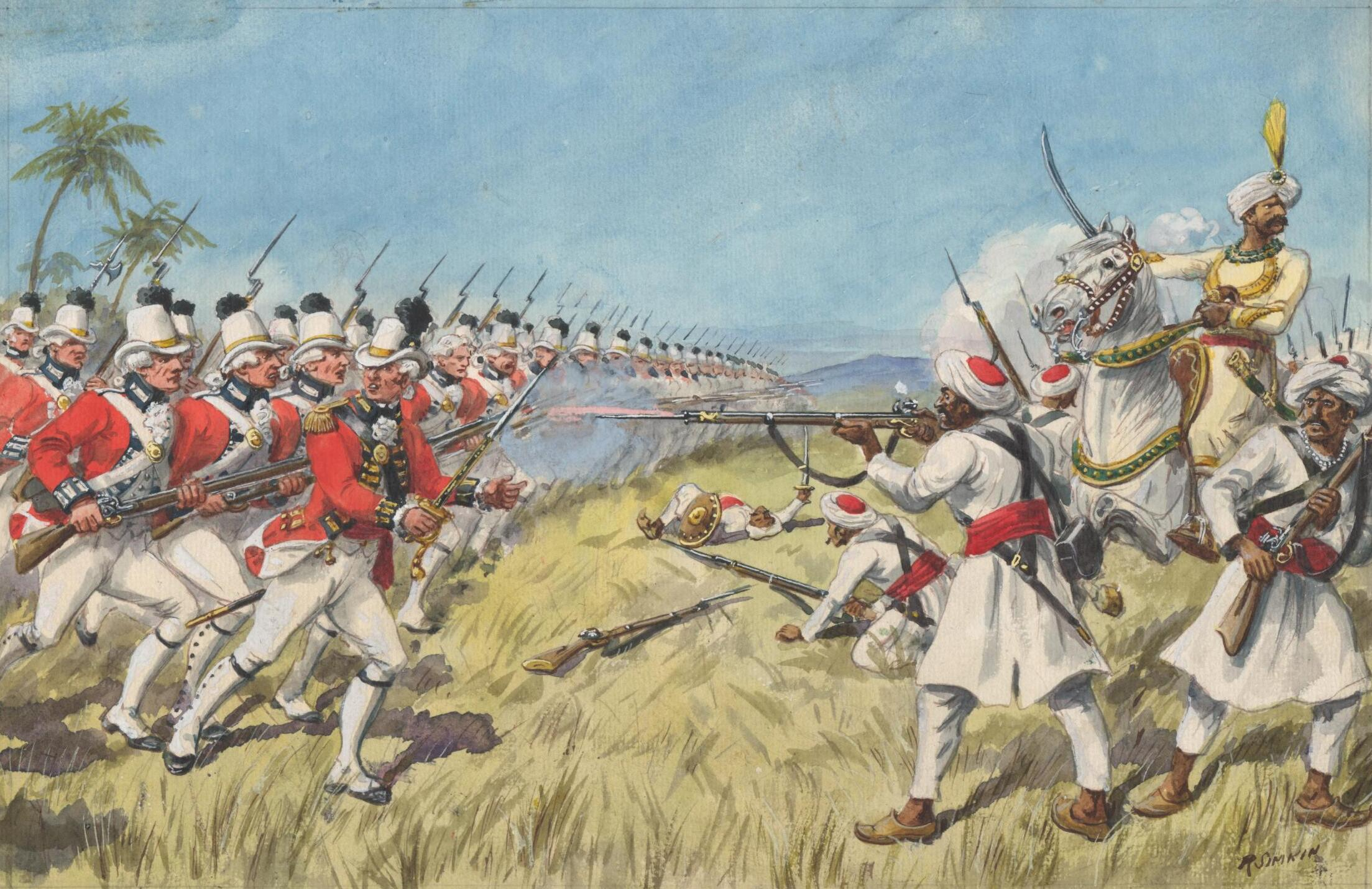
The 1st Bengal European Regiment (left) at the 1783 siege of Cuddalore

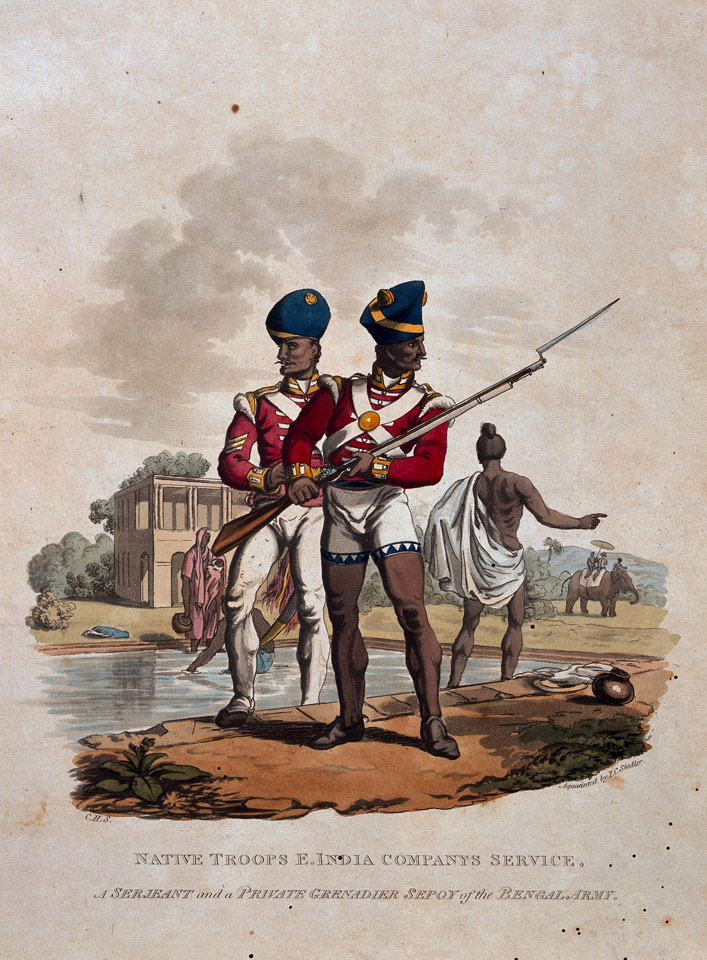
1812 engraving of a havildar and sepoy of a Bengal Native Infantry grenadier company

In 1757, the first locally recruited unit of Bengal sepoys was created in the form of the Lal Paltan battalion. It was recruited from soldiers that had served in the Nawab's Army from Bihar and the Awadh (Oudh) who were collectively called Purbiyas. Drilled and armed along British army lines this force served well at the Battle of Plassey in 1757 and 20 more Indian battalions were raised by 1764. In 1766, the Monghyr Mutiny, quelled by Robert Clive, affected many of the white officers of the Bengal Army.

In his deposition, Lieutenant General Jasper Nicolls, who was an army commander stationed in India, stated of the Bengal Army's recruitment that:

"It may well be said that the whole sepoy army of Bengal is drawn from the Company's province of Bihar and Oudh, with very few exceptions".

The East India Company steadily expanded its Bengal Army and by 1796 the establishment was set at three battalions of European artillery, three regiments of European infantry, ten regiments of Indian cavalry and twelve regiments (each of two battalions) of Indian infantry.

In 1824 the Bengal Army underwent reorganisation, with the regular infantry being grouped into 68 single battalion regiments numbered according to their date of establishment. Nine additional infantry regiments were subsequently raised, though several existing units were disbanded between 1826 and 1843. On the eve of the First Afghan War (1839–42) the Bengal Army had achieved a dominant role in the forces of the HEIC. There were 74 battalions of Bengal regular infantry against only 52 from Madras, 26 from Bombay and 24 British (Queen's and Company). On average an inch and a half taller and a stone heavier than the southern Indian troops, the Bengal sepoy was highly regarded by a military establishment that tended to evaluate its soldiers by physical appearance.

A new feature in the Bengal Army was the creation of irregular infantry and cavalry regiments during the 1840s. Originally designated as "Local Infantry" these were permanently established units but with less formal drill and fewer British officers than the regular Bengal line regiments.

The main source of recruitment continued to be high caste Brahmins, Bhumihars and Rajputs from Bihar and Oudh, although the eight regular cavalry regiments consisted mainly of Muslim sowars from the Indian Muslim biradaris such as the Ranghar, Sheikhs, Sayyids, Mughals, and Hindustani Pathans.

Another innovation introduced prior to 1845 was to designate specific regiments as "Volunteers" – that is recruited for general service, with sepoys who had accepted a commitment for possible overseas duty. Recruits for the Bengal Army who were prepared to travel by ship if required, received a special allowance or batta. Two of these BNI regiments were serving in China in 1857 and so escaped any involvement in the great rebellion of that year. The East India Company's Bengal Army in 1857 consisted of 151,361 men of all ranks, of whom the great majority - 128,663 - were Indians.

=== Indian Rebellion 1857 ===
A total of 64 Bengal Army regular infantry and cavalry regiments rebelled during the Indian Rebellion of 1857, or were disbanded after their continued loyalty was considered doubtful. From 1858 onwards the Chamars (outcaste) and the actual high-caste Awadhi and Bihari Hindu presence in the Bengal Army was reduced because of their perceived primary role as "mutineers" in the 1857 rebellion. The new and less homogeneous Bengal Army was essentially drawn from Punjabi Muslims, Sikhs, Gurkhas, Baluchis and Pathans, although twelve of the pre-mutiny Bengal line infantry regiments continued in service with the same basis of recruitment, traditions and uniform colours as before.

A largely unspoken rationale was that an army of diverse origins was unlikely to unite in rebellion.

=== Demise ===
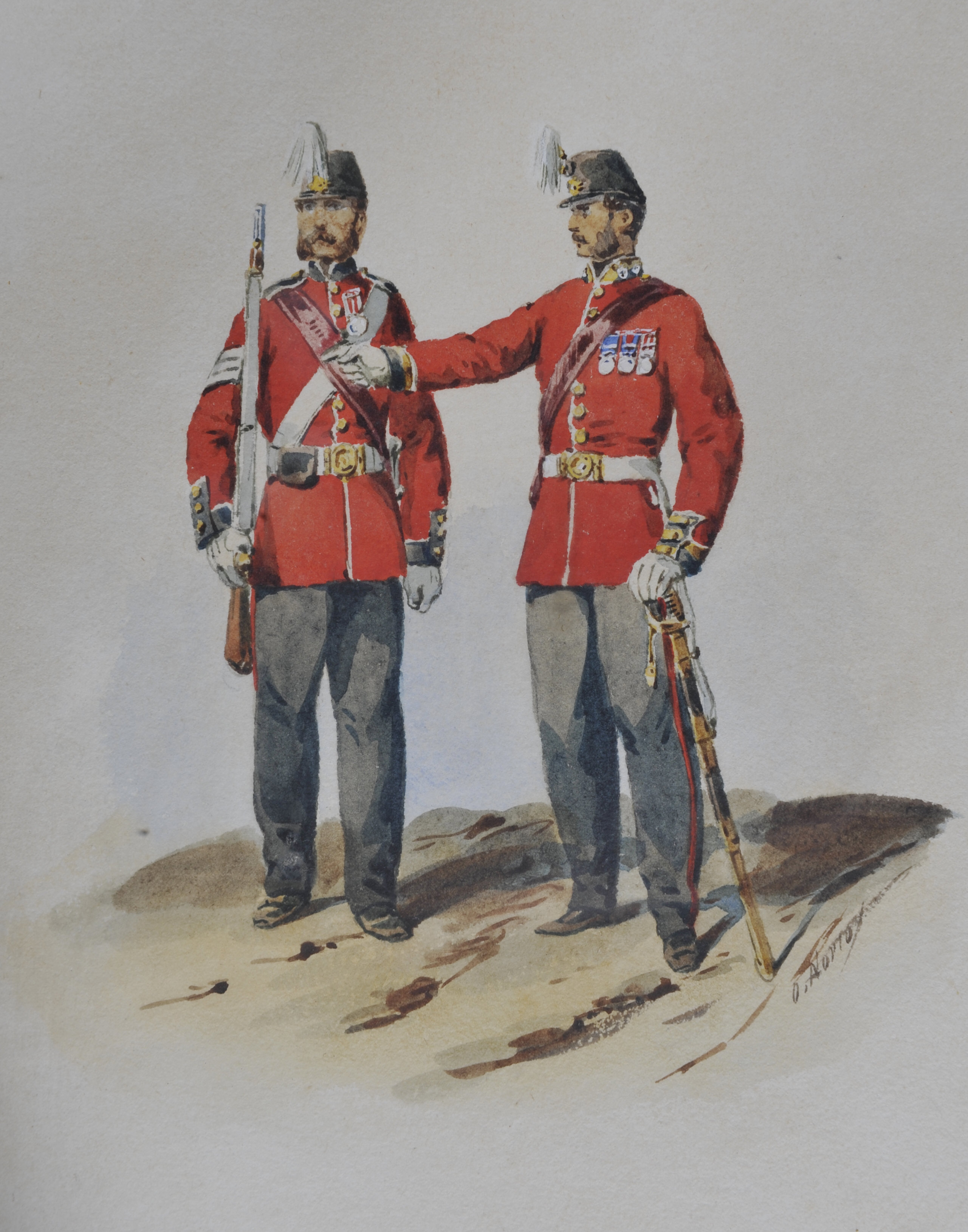
A sergeant and officer of the 1st European Bengal Fusiliers in 1855–1862

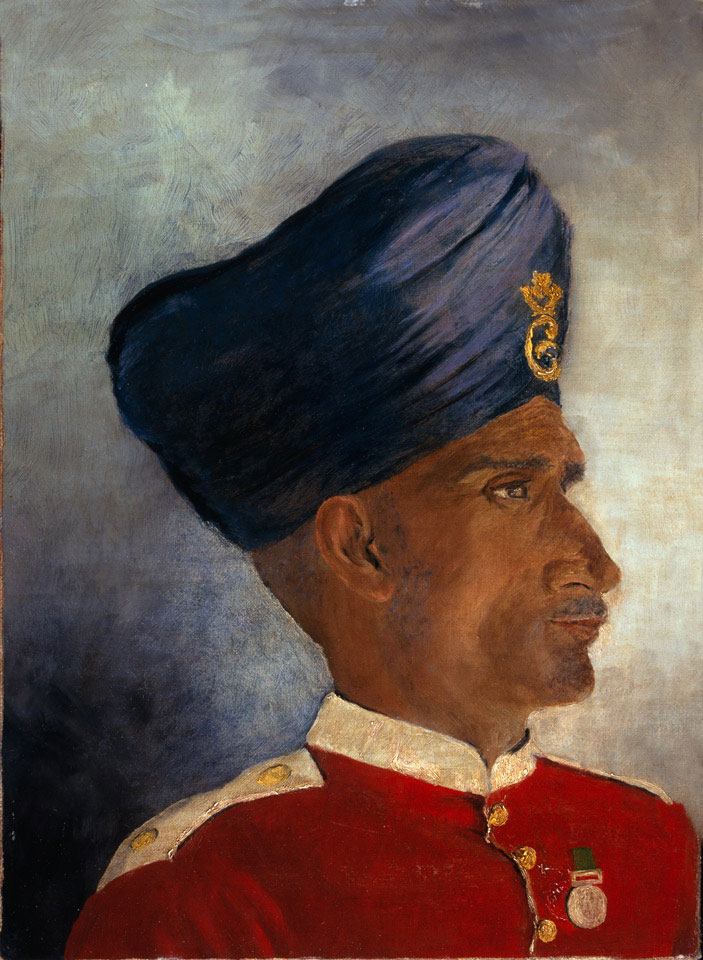
c. 1900 portrait of a sepoy of the 6th Bengal Light Infantry

In 1895 the three separate Presidency Armies began a process of unification which was not to be concluded until the Kitchener reforms of eight years later. As an initial step the Army of India was divided into four commands, each commanded by a lieutenant-general. These comprised Bengal, Bombay (including Aden), Madras (including Burma) and Punjab (including the North West Frontier). In 1903 the separately numbered regiments of the Bombay, Madras and Bengal Armies were unified in a single organisational sequence and the presidency affiliations disappeared.

The Bengal infantry units in existence at the end of the Presidency era continued as the senior regiments (1st Brahmans to 48th Pioneers) of the newly unified Indian Army.

== Ethnic composition ==
The Bengal Army of the East India Company was mainly recruited from high castes living in Bihar and the Awadh.

Prior to 1857, company military service was most popular in the zamindaris of North and South Bihar with the East India Company signing contracts to raise levies of troops from them. Recruits from the Rajput and Brahman caste were common and they would use service in the Bengal Army as an opportunity to raise their wealth and status and for this reason, the Bhumihar zamindaris of Bihar became "prime recruiting grounds" for the Army.

In the 1780s, the Company maintained a major recruiting station in Buxar with six companies under a Captain Eaton. These recruiting stations in Bihar were kept as "nurseries" which supplied battalions when drafts were made. Other recruiting centres were located in Bhagalpur, Shahabad, Monghyr, Saran and Hajipur.

Brigadier Troup, who served as the commander of Bareilly, stated of recruitment that the 'Bengal native Infantry came chiefly from the province of Awadh, Buxar, Bhojpur and Arrah.' In 1810, Francis Buchanan-Hamilton noted in his account of the districts of Bihar, that the number of men absent from Shahabad to serve in the Army was 4680. The Ujjainiya zamindar of Bhojpur also informed him that 12000 recruits from his district had joined the Bengal Army.

Writing in The Indian Army (1834), Sir John Malcolm, who had a lifetime's experience of Indian soldiering, wrote: "They consist largely of Rajpoots (Rajput), who are a distinguished race. We may judge the size of these men when we are told that the height below which no recruit is taken is five feet six inches. The great proportion of the Grenadiers are six feet and upwards."

Both prior to and following 1857, the Bengal Army included what were to become some of the most famous units in India: Skinner's Horse, the Gurkhas from the Himalayas and the Corps of Guides on the Khyber-Pakhtunkhwa.

=== Cavalry ===
==== Bengal Regular Cavalry ====
These were:

- 1st Regiment of Light Cavalry
- 2nd Regiment of Light Cavalry
- 3rd Regiment of Light Cavalry
- 4th Regiment of Light Cavalry (Lancers)
- 5th Regiment of Light Cavalry
- 6th Regiment of Light Cavalry
- 7th Regiment of Light Cavalry
- 8th Regiment of Light Cavalry
- 9th Regiment of Light Cavalry
- 10th Regiment of Light Cavalry

==== Bengal Irregular Cavalry ====
These were:

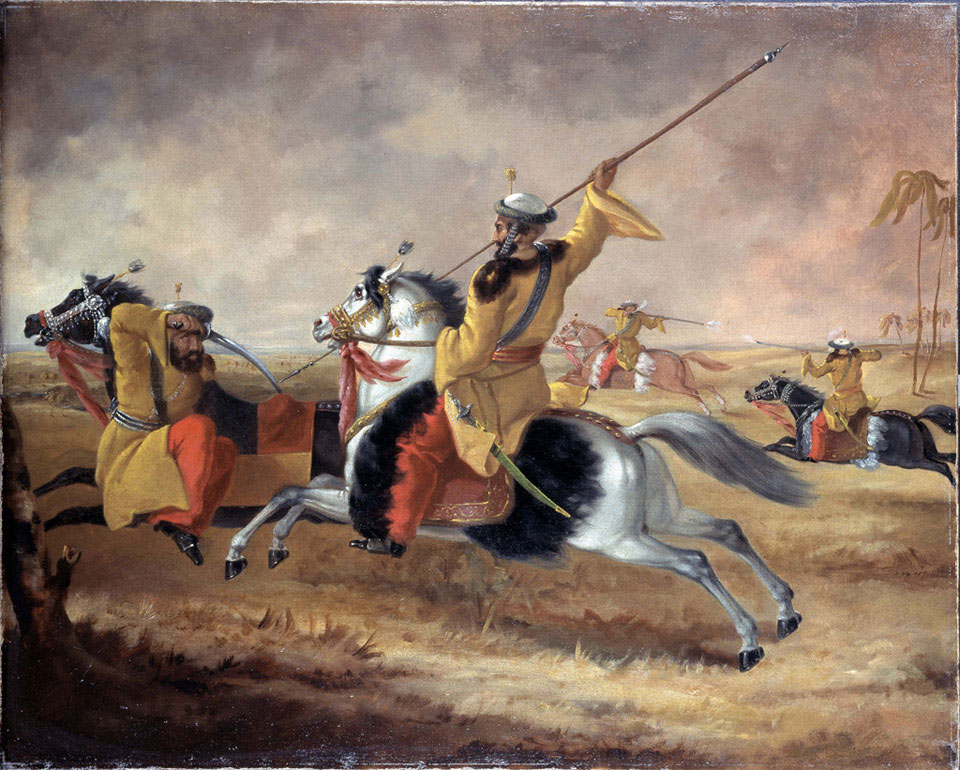
Skinner's Horse at Exercis

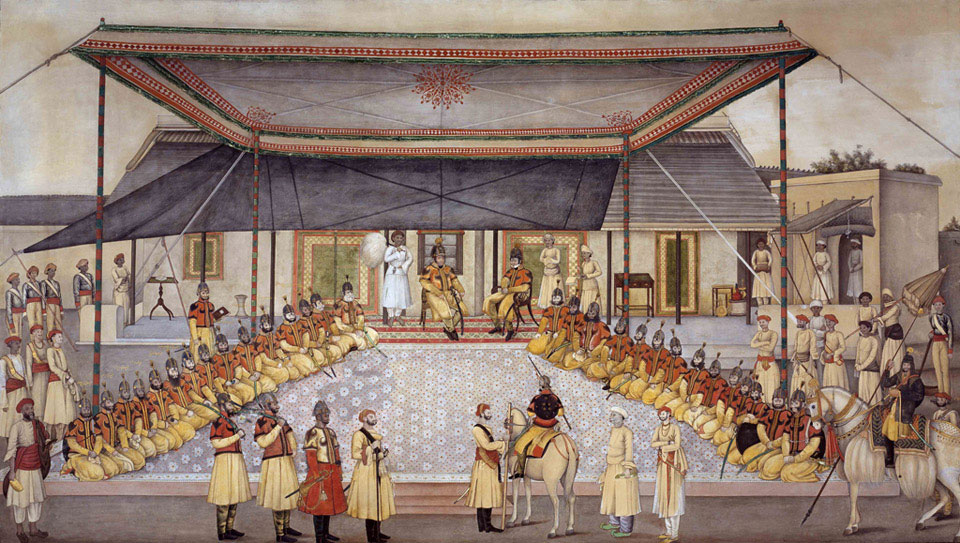
Skinner's Horse Regimental Durbar

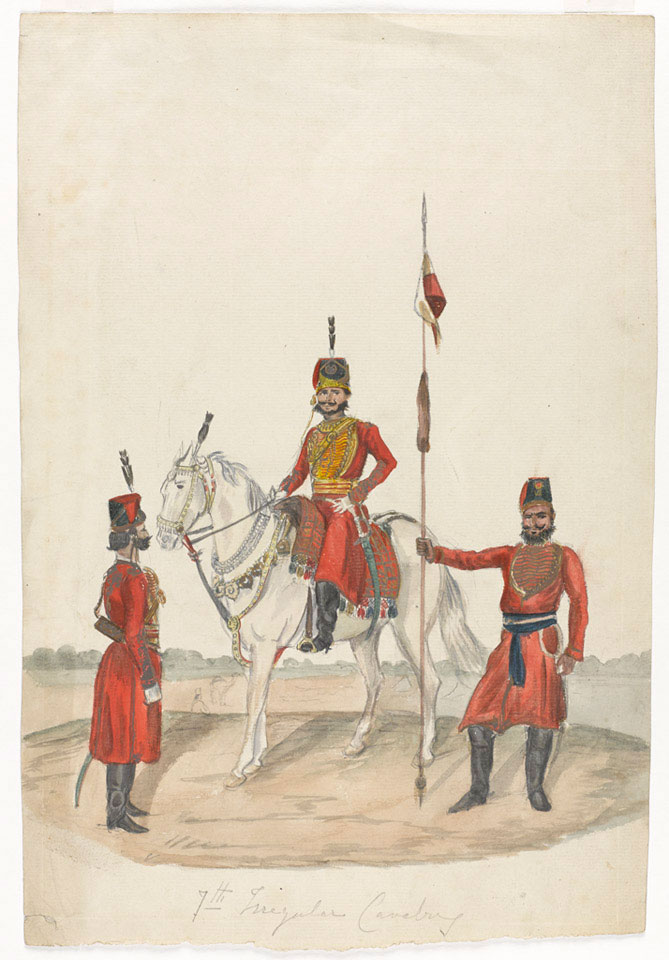
'7th Irregular Cavalry', 1841 (c)

- 1st Irregular Cavalry
- 2nd Irregular Cavalry
- 3rd Irregular Cavalry
- 4th Irregular Cavalry
- 5th Irregular Cavalry
- 6th Irregular Cavalry
- 7th Irregular Cavalry
- 8th Irregular Cavalry
- 9th Irregular Cavalry
- 10th Irregular Cavalry
- 11th Irregular Cavalry
- 12th Irregular Cavalry
- 13th Irregular Cavalry
- 14th Irregular Cavalry
- 15th Irregular Cavalry
- 16th Irregular Cavalry
- 17th Irregular Cavalry
- 18th Irregular Cavalry

=== Artillery ===
==== Bengal Horse Artillery ====
These were:

- 1st Brigade
  - 3 European Troops
  - 2 Native Troops
- 2nd Brigade
  - 3 European Troops
  - Native Troop
- 3rd Brigade
  - 3 European Troops
  - Native Troop

==== Bengal European Foot Artillery (4 companies per battalion) ====
These were:

- 1st Battalion
- 2nd Battalion
- 3rd Battalion
- 4th Battalion
- 5th Battalion
- 6th Battalion

==== Bengal Native Foot Artillery (6 companies per battalion) ====
These were:

- 1st Battalion
- 2nd Battalion
- 3rd Battalion

=== Engineers ===
==== Corps of Engineers ====
These were:

==== Corps of Bengal Sappers and Miners ====
These were:

=== Infantry ===
==== Bengal European Infantry ====
These were:

- 1st Bengal (European) Fusiliers
- 2nd Bengal (European) Fusiliers
- 3rd Bengal (European) Regiment

==== Bengal Native Infantry ====
These were:

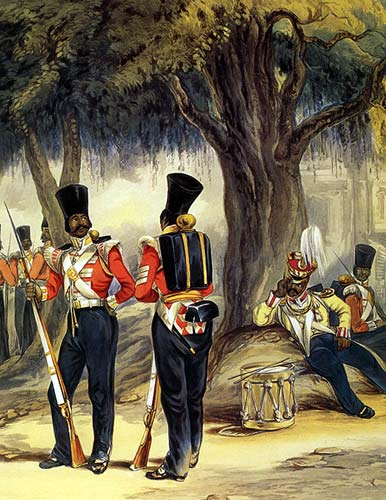
Bengal Native Infantry 1846

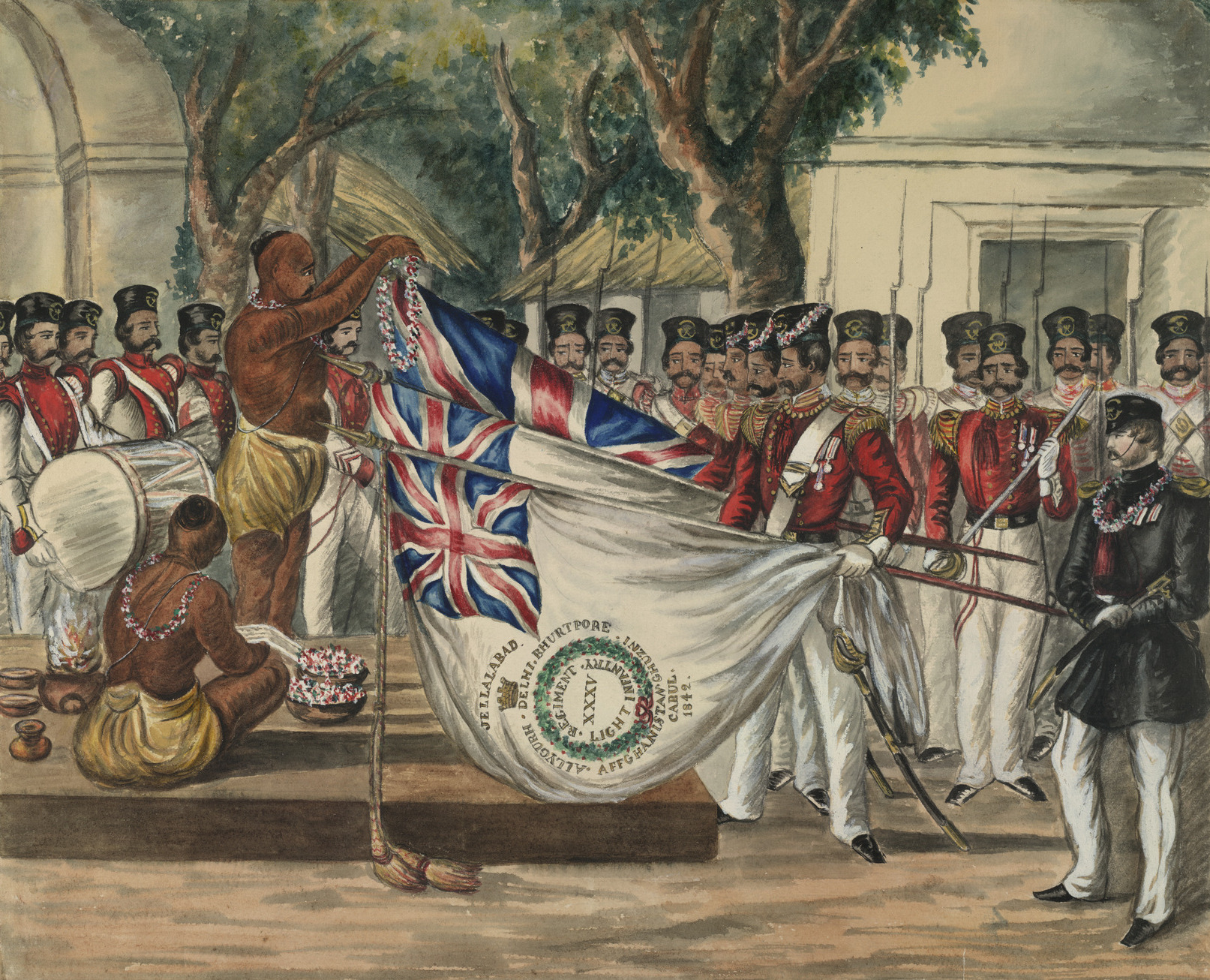
Hindu priests garlanding the colours of the 35th Bengal Light Infantry at a Presentation of Colours ceremony, c. 1847

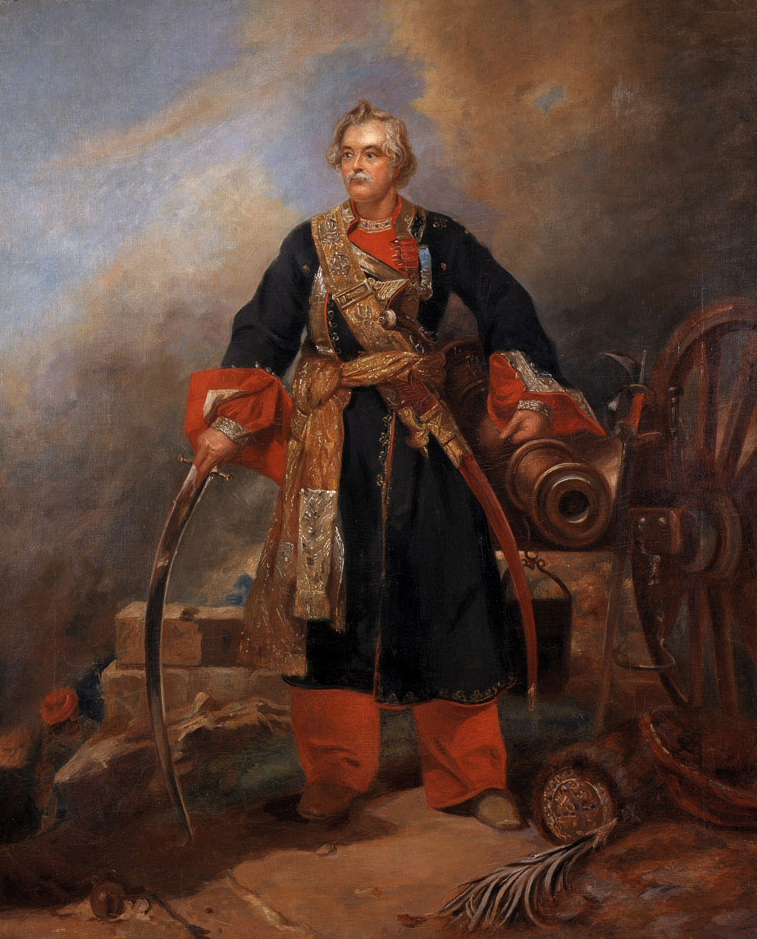
Lieutenant-General Sir John Bennet Hearsey, 2nd (Bengal) Irregular Cavalry (Gardner's Horse). Painted circa 1839.

- 1st Regiment of Bengal Native Infantry
- 2nd Regiment of Bengal Native Infantry (Grenadiers)
- 3rd Regiment of Bengal Native Infantry
- 4th Regiment of Bengal Native Infantry
- 5th Regiment of Bengal Native Infantry
- 6th Regiment of Bengal Native Infantry
- 7th Regiment of Bengal Native Infantry
- 8th Regiment of Bengal Native Infantry
- 9th Regiment of Bengal Native Infantry
- 10th Regiment of Bengal Native Infantry
- 11th Regiment of Bengal Native Infantry
- 12th Regiment of Bengal Native Infantry
- 13th Regiment of Bengal Native Infantry
- 14th Regiment of Bengal Native Infantry
- 15th Regiment of Bengal Native Infantry
- 16th Regiment of Bengal Native Infantry (Grenadiers)
- 17th Regiment of Bengal Native Infantry
- 18th Regiment of Bengal Native Infantry
- 19th Regiment of Bengal Native Infantry
- 20th Regiment of Bengal Native Infantry
- 21st Regiment of Bengal Native Infantry
- 22nd Regiment of Bengal Native Infantry
- 23rd Regiment of Bengal Native Infantry
- 24th Regiment of Bengal Native Infantry
- 25th Regiment of Bengal Native Infantry
- 26th Regiment of Bengal Light Infantry
- 27th Regiment of Bengal Native Infantry
- 28th Regiment of Bengal Native Infantry
- 29th Regiment of Bengal Native Infantry
- 30th Regiment of Bengal Native Infantry
- 31st Regiment of Bengal Native Infantry
- 32nd Regiment of Bengal Native Infantry
- 33rd Regiment of Bengal Native Infantry
- 34th Regiment of Bengal Native Infantry
- 35th Regiment of Bengal Light Infantry
- 36th Regiment of Bengal Native Infantry (Volunteers)
- 37th Regiment of Bengal Native Infantry (Volunteers)
- 38th Regiment of Bengal Light Infantry (Volunteers)
- 39th Regiment of Bengal Native Infantry (Volunteers)
- 40th Regiment of Bengal Native Infantry (Volunteers)
- 41st Regiment of Bengal Native Infantry
- 42nd Regiment of Bengal Light Infantry
- 43rd Regiment of Bengal Light Infantry
- 44th Regiment of Bengal Native Infantry
- 45th Regiment of Bengal Native Infantry
- 46th Regiment of Bengal Native Infantry
- 47th Regiment of Bengal Native Infantry (Volunteers)
- 48th Regiment of Bengal Native Infantry
- 49th Regiment of Bengal Native Infantry
- 50th Regiment of Bengal Native Infantry
- 51st Regiment of Bengal Native Infantry
- 52nd Regiment of Bengal Native Infantry
- 53rd Regiment of Bengal Native Infantry
- 54th Regiment of Bengal Native Infantry
- 55th Regiment of Bengal Native Infantry
- 56th Regiment of Bengal Native Infantry
- 57th Regiment of Bengal Native Infantry
- 58th Regiment of Bengal Native Infantry
- 59th Regiment of Bengal Native Infantry
- 60th Regiment of Bengal Native Infantry
- 61st Regiment of Bengal Native Infantry
- 62nd Regiment of Bengal Native Infantry
- 63rd Regiment of Bengal Native Infantry
- 64th Regiment of Bengal Native Infantry
- 65th Regiment of Bengal Native Infantry (Volunteers)
- 66th Regiment of Bengal Native Infantry (Goorkha Regiment)
- 67th Regiment of Bengal Native Infantry (Volunteers)
- 68th Regiment of Bengal Native Infantry
- 69th Regiment of Bengal Native Infantry
- 70th Regiment of Bengal Native Infantry
- 71st Regiment of Bengal Native Infantry
- 72nd Regiment of Bengal Native Infantry
- 73rd Regiment of Bengal Native Infantry
- 74th Regiment of Bengal Native Infantry

===== Bengal Local Infantry =====
These were:

- Calcutta Native Militia
- Ramghur Light Infantry Battalion
- Hill Rangers
- New Nusseree (Rifle) Battalion
- Pegu Light Infantry Battalion
- Sirmoor Rifle Battalion
- Kemaoon Battalion
- 1st Assam Light Infantry
- 2nd Assam Light Infantry
- Mhairwarrah Battalion
- Arracan Battalion
- Hurrianah Light Infantry Battalion
- 1st Regiment of Oude Infantry
- 2nd Regiment of Oude Infantry
- Sylhet Light Infantry Battalion

===== Other infantry units =====
These were:

- Regiment of Kelat-i-Ghilzie
- Sikh battalions
  - Regiment of Loodianah
  - Regiment of Ferozepore

=== Punjab Irregular Force ===
These were:

==== Punjab Cavalry ====
- 1st Regiment of Punjab Cavalry
- 2nd Regiment of Punjab Cavalry
- 3rd Regiment of Punjab Cavalry
- 4th Regiment of Punjab Cavalry
- 5th Regiment of Punjab Cavalry

==== Punjab Infantry ====
- 1st Regiment of Punjab Infantry, Punjab Frontier Force
- 2nd Regiment of Punjab Infantry, Punjab Frontier Force
- 3rd Regiment of Punjab Infantry, Punjab Frontier Force
- 4th Regiment of Punjab Infantry, Punjab Frontier Force
- 5th Regiment of Punjab Infantry, Punjab Frontier Force
- Scinde Rifle Corps

==== Sikh Corps ====
- 1st Regiment of Sikh Infantry
- 2nd Regiment of Sikh Infantry
- 3rd Regiment of Sikh Infantry
- 4th Regiment of Sikh Infantry
- Corps of Guides

=== Other units ===
These were:

- Nagpore Irregular Force
  - Cavalry Regiment
  - Artillery
  - 1st Infantry
  - 2nd Infantry
  - 3rd Infantry
- Malwa Bheel Corps
- Meywar Bheel Corps
- Sebundy Corps of Sappers and Miners
- The Shekhawatee Brigade (Cavalry, Artillery, Infantry)
- The Joudpore Legion (Cavalry, Artillery, Infantry)
- Gwalior Contingent
  - 1st Cavalry
  - 2nd Cavalry
  - Artillery
  - 1st Infantry
  - 2nd Infantry
  - 3rd Infantry
  - 4th Infantry
  - 5th Infantry
  - 6th Infantry
  - 7th Infantry
- Malwa Contingent (Cavalry, Artillery, Infantry)
- Bhopal Contingent (Cavalry, Artillery, Infantry)
- Hyderabad Contingent
  - 1st Cavalry
  - 2nd Cavalry
  - 3rd Cavalry
  - 4th Cavalry
  - Artillery
  - 1st Infantry
  - 2nd Infantry
  - 3rd Infantry
  - 4th Infantry
  - 5th Infantry
  - 6th Infantry
- Kotah Contingent (Cavalry, Artillery, Infantry)

== Units raised during 1857 Rebellion ==
=== Cavalry ===
==== Bengal European Cavalry ====
These were:

- 1st European Light Cavalry
- 2nd European Light Cavalry
- 3rd European Light Cavalry
- 4th European Light Cavalry
- 5th European Light Cavalry

==== Sikh Irregular Cavalry ====
These were:

- 1st Sikh Irregular Cavalry
- 2nd Sikh Irregular Cavalry
- 3rd Sikh Irregular Cavalry
- 4th Sikh Irregular Cavalry

=== Infantry ===
==== Bengal European Infantry ====
These were:

- 4th European Infantry
- 5th European Infantry
- 6th European Infantry

==== Bengal Local Infantry ====
These were:

- Calcutta Volunteer Guards (Cavalry, Artillery, Infantry)

==== Other infantry units ====
- Irregular Regiment, Ferozepore

=== Punjab Irregular Force ===
==== Punjab Infantry ====
These were:

- 7th Regiment of Punjab Infantry
- 8th Regiment of Punjab Infantry
- 9th Regiment of Punjab Infantry
- 10th Regiment of Punjab Infantry
- 11th Regiment of Punjab Infantry
- 12th Regiment of Punjab Infantry
- 13th Regiment of Punjab Infantry
- 14th Regiment of Punjab Infantry
- 15th Regiment of Punjab Infantry
- 16th Regiment of Punjab Infantry
- 17th Regiment of Punjab Infantry
- 18th Regiment of Punjab Infantry
- 19th Regiment of Punjab Infantry
- 20th Regiment of Punjab Infantry
- 21st Regiment of Punjab Infantry
- 22nd Regiment of Punjab Infantry
- 23rd Regiment of Punjab Infantry
- 24th Regiment of Punjab Infantry
- 25th Regiment of Punjab Infantry

==== Sikh Corps ====
- Sikh Volunteers

=== Other units ===
These were:

- Muneepoor Regiment
- Kamroop Regiment
- Mhair Regiment
- Peshawur Light Horse
- Lahore Light Horse
- Camel Corps
- Beatson's Horse
  - 1st Regiment
  - 2nd Regiment
- Rohilcund Horse
- Goorkha Force
- Extra Goorkha Regiment
- Irregular Horse
- Mahratta Horse
  - 1st Regiment
  - 2nd Regiment
- Hodson's Horse
  - 1st Regiment
  - 2nd Regiment
  - 3rd Regiment
- Mynpoorie Irregular Horse

== Composition in 1864 ==
=== Cavalry ===
These were:

- 1st Regiment of Bengal Cavalry
- 2nd Regiment of Bengal Cavalry
- 3rd Regiment of Bengal Cavalry
- 4th Regiment of Bengal Cavalry
- 5th Regiment of Bengal Cavalry
- 6th Regiment of Bengal Cavalry
- 7th Regiment of Bengal Cavalry
- 8th Regiment of Bengal Cavalry
- 9th Regiment of Bengal Cavalry
- 10th Regiment of Bengal Cavalry
- 11th Regiment of Bengal Cavalry
- 12th Regiment of Bengal Cavalry
- 13th Regiment of Bengal Cavalry
- 14th Regiment of Bengal Cavalry
- 15th Regiment of Bengal Cavalry
- 16th Regiment of Bengal Cavalry
- 17th Regiment of Bengal Cavalry
- 18th Regiment of Bengal Cavalry
- 19th Regiment of Bengal Cavalry
- Lahore Light Horse
- 1st Regiment of Central India Horse
- 2nd Regiment of Central India Horse

=== Artillery ===
These were:

==== Royal Horse Artillery ====
- C Brigade
- F Brigade

==== Royal Artillery ====
- 16th Brigade
- 19th Brigade
- 22nd Brigade
- 24th Brigade
- 25th Brigade

=== Engineers ===
- Royal Engineers
- Corps of Sappers and Miners

=== Infantry ===
These were:

- 1st Native Infantry
- 2nd Native Infantry
- 3rd Native Infantry
- 4th Native Infantry (Volunteer Corps)
- 5th Native Infantry
- 6th Native (Light) Infantry
- 7th Native Infantry
- 8th Native Infantry
- 9th Native Infantry
- 10th Native Infantry
- 11th Native Infantry
- 12th Native Infantry
- 13th Native Infantry
- 14th Native Infantry
- 15th Native Infantry
- 16th Native Infantry
- 17th Native Infantry
- 18th Native Infantry
- 19th Native Infantry
- 20th Native Infantry
- 21st Native Infantry
- 22nd Native Infantry
- 23rd Native Infantry
- 24th Native Infantry
- 25th Native Infantry
- 26th Native Infantry
- 27th Native Infantry
- 28th Native Infantry
- 29th Native Infantry
- 30th Native Infantry
- 31st Native Infantry
- 32nd Native Infantry
- 33rd Native Infantry
- 34th Native Infantry
- 35th Native Infantry
- 36th Native Infantry
- 37th Native Infantry
- 38th Native Infantry
- 39th Native Infantry
- 40th Native Infantry
- 41st Native Infantry
- 42nd Native Infantry
- 43rd Native Infantry
- 44th Native Infantry
- 45th Native Infantry
- 1st Goorkha Regiment
- 2nd Goorkha Regiment
- 3rd Goorkha Regiment
- 4th Goorkha Regiment
- 5th Goorkha Regiment

=== Punjab Irregular Force ===
==== Sikh Infantry ====
These were:

- 1st Regiment
- 2nd Regiment
- 3rd Regiment
- 4th Regiment

==== Punjab Cavalry ====
These were:

- 1st Regiment
- 2nd Regiment
- 3rd Regiment
- 4th Regiment
- 5th Regiment

==== Punjab Infantry ====
These were:

- 1st Punjab Infantry
- 2nd Punjab Infantry
- 3rd Punjab Infantry
- 4th Punjab Infantry
- 5th Punjab Infantry
- 6th Punjab Infantry

=== Other units ===
These were:

- Malwa Bheel Corps
- Meywar Bheel Corps
- Sebundy Corps of Sappers and Miners
- East Indian Regiment
- Erinpoora Irregular Force (Cavalry and Infantry)
- Deolee Irregular Force (Cavalry and Infantry)
- Bhopaul Levy
- Hyderabad Contingent
  - Artillery
    - 1st Company
    - 2nd Company
    - 3rd Company
    - 4th Company
  - 1st Cavalry
  - 2nd Cavalry
  - 3rd Cavalry
  - 4th Cavalry
  - 1st Infantry
  - 2nd Infantry
  - 3rd Infantry
  - 4th Infantry
  - 5th Infantry
  - 6th Infantry

== Commanders ==
Because the Bengal Army was the largest of the three Presidency Armies, its Commander-in-Chief was, from 1853 to 1895, also Commander-in-Chief, India.
Commander-in-Chief, Bengal Command

- Lieutenant-General Sir William Elles (1895–1896)
- Lieutenant-General Sir Baker Russell (1896–1898)
- Lieutenant-General Sir George Luck (1898–1903)
- Lieutenant-General Sir Alfred Gaselee (1903–1907)

== Table of Organisation ==
The following data has been retrieved from The Quarterly Indian Army List for 1 January 1901. This date was chosen for being in a suitable time period at the end of the Bengal Army (divided at this time into Bengal and Punjab Commands).

	British personnel	Indian Officers	Other Ranks	Total
Native Cavalry Regiment (Bengal and Punjab)	Commandant 4 Squadron Commanders 5 Squadron Officers Adjudant Medical Officer	Risaldar-Major 3 Risaldars 5 Ressaidars (including Wardi-Major) 8 Jamadars	8 Kot-Daffadars 54 Daffadars	637 per regiment
Native Cavalry Regiment (Bengal and Punjab)	Commandant 4 Squadron Commanders 5 Squadron Officers Adjudant Medical Officer	Risaldar-Major 3 Risaldars 5 Ressaidars (including Wardi-Major) 8 Jamadars	519 Sowars (504 horsemen, 8 camel riders, 3 clerks 4 Ward Orderlies) 8 Trumpeters Farrier-Major, 16 Farriers Salutri, Assistant Salutri	637 per regiment
Corps of Guides	Commandant 3 Squadron Commanders 4 Squadron Officers 4 Double-company Commanders 5 Double-company Officers 2 Adjudants (1 each for cavalry and infantry) Quartermaster Medical Officer	Risaldar Major, Subadar Major 2 Risaldars 4 Ressaidars (including Wardi-Major) 7 Subadars 14 Jamadars	6 Kot Daffadars, 40 Havildars 42 Daffadars, 40 Naiks	1402 total
Corps of Guides	Commandant 3 Squadron Commanders 4 Squadron Officers 4 Double-company Commanders 5 Double-company Officers 2 Adjudants (1 each for cavalry and infantry) Quartermaster Medical Officer	Risaldar Major, Subadar Major 2 Risaldars 4 Ressaidars (including Wardi-Major) 7 Subadars 14 Jamadars	402 Sowars (391 horsemen, 8 camel riders, 3 Ward Orderlies) 800 sepoys (including 4 Ward Orderlies) 6 Trumpeters, 16 Buglers	1402 total
Mountain Artillery Battery	Captain 4 Subalterns	Subadar 3 Jamadars	Havildar Major, Pay Havildar, 10 Havildars 3 Daffadars, 13 Naiks	373 per battery
Mountain Artillery Battery	Captain 4 Subalterns	Subadar 3 Jamadars	114 Gunners 26 Muleteers 191 Drivers 2 Trumpeters Salutri 2 Shoeing Smiths	373 per battery
Punjab Garrison Artillery	Captain	Subadar Jamadar	6 Havildars 6 Naiks	76 total
Punjab Garrison Artillery	Captain	Subadar Jamadar	60 Gunners Trumpeter	76 total
Corps of Bengal Sappers and Miners	Commandant 2 Superintendents Adjudant 10 Company Commanders 10 Company Officers Medical Officer	10 Subadars 18 Jamadars	67 Havildars 101 Naiks	1872 total
Corps of Bengal Sappers and Miners	Warrant Officer, Regimental Sergeant Major Regimental Quartermaster Sergeant, 2 Quartermaster Segreant Instructors, 4 Company Sergeant Majors 40 British Non-commissioned Officers	10 Subadars 18 Jamadars	1404 Sappers 90 Drivers 18 Buglers 90 Recruit and Pension Boys	1872 total
Native Infantry Regiment (Bengal, Gurkha and Punjab)	Commandant 4 Double-company Commanders 4 Double-company Officers Adjudant Quartermaster Medical Officer	Subadar Major 7 Subadars 8 Jamadars	40 Havildars 40 Naiks	924 per regiment
Native Infantry Regiment (Bengal, Gurkha and Punjab)	Commandant 4 Double-company Commanders 4 Double-company Officers Adjudant Quartermaster Medical Officer	Subadar Major 7 Subadars 8 Jamadars	800 Sepoys (including 3 clerks and 4 Ward Orderlies) 16 Drummers	924 per regiment

Each Mountain Artillery battery was authorised 10 horses and 233 mules.

The Bengal Sappers and Miners were authorised 90 mules.

Gurkha Regiments were authorised 14 or 20 supernumerary personnel per battalion. The 2nd (31st before 1860) Bengal Light Infantry and 2nd Gurkha Rifles were authorised 1 extra Jamadar to carry their respective honorary colours. Pioneer Regiments were authorised 24 Artificers each (2 Havildars, 2 Naik and 20 Sepoys) each. The Havildar and Naik Artificers were supernumerary NCOs.

== See also ==
- Presidency armies
- Bombay Army
- Madras Army

== Sources ==
- Bickers, Robert A.; Tiedemann, R. G. (2007). The Boxers, China, and the World. Rowman & Littlefield. ISBN 978-0-7425-5395-8.
- Carmen (1969). Indian Army Uniforms under the British from the 18th century to 1947. Artillery, Engineers and Infantry. Morgan-Grampian Books Ltd. ISBN 978-0-249-43956-4.
- Mollo, Boris (1981). The Indian Army. Littlehampton Book Services Ltd. ISBN 978-0-7137-1074-8.
- Raugh, Harold (2004). The Victorians at War, 1815–1914: An Encyclopedia of British Military History. ABC-CLIO Ltd. ISBN 978-1-57607-925-6.
- Shah, Giriraja (1999). Nainital: The Land of Trumpet and Song; Based on J.M. Clay's Book on Nainital. Shakti Malik. ISBN 978-81-7017-324-3.
