= 54th Sikhs (Frontier Force) =

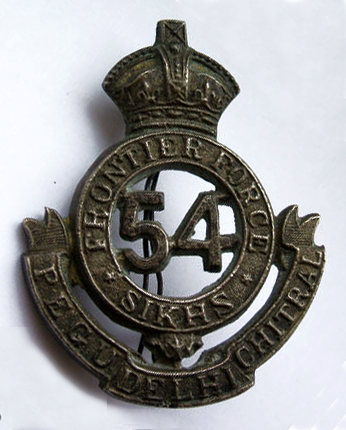
- Active: 1846 - 1922
- Country: British India
- Branch: British Indian Army
- Type: Infantry
- Size: 2 Battalions
- Nickname: Burmah Paltan
- Uniform: Drab; faced emerald green
- Engagements: North West Frontier of India; Second Burmese War 1852-53; Indian Mutiny 1857-58; First World War 1914-18; Third Afghan War 1919

The 54th Sikhs (Frontier Force) were an infantry regiment of the British Indian Army. It was raised in 1846 as the 4th Regiment of Infantry The Frontier Brigade. It was designated as the 54th Sikhs (Frontier Force) in 1903 and became 4th Battalion (Sikhs) 12th Frontier Force Regiment in 1922. In 1947, it was allocated to the Pakistan Army, where it continues to exist as 6th Battalion The Frontier Force Regiment.

== Early history ==
The regiment was raised on 1 January 1846 at Ludhiana as the 4th Regiment of Infantry The Frontier Brigade by Captain C Mackenzie from men transferred from the Umballa Police Battalion and the 6th and 11th Regiments of Bengal Native Infantry. In 1847, it was designated 4th Regiment of Sikh Local Infantry, becoming the 4th Regiment of Sikh Infantry in 1857. In 1851, it became part of the Punjab Irregular Force, which later became famous as the Punjab Frontier Force or The Piffers. The Piffers consisted of five regiments of cavalry, eleven regiments of infantry and five batteries of artillery besides the Corps of Guides. Their mission was to maintain order on the Punjab Frontier; a task they performed with great aplomb. In 1852, the regiment volunteered for service in the Second Burmese War 1852-53, returning to India in 1854. On the outbreak of the Indian Mutiny in 1857, the regiment marched from Abbottabad to Delhi; 560 miles in thirty days in an Indian June, going into action soon after their arrival. In 1895, it served in the Chitral Campaign.

== 54th Sikhs (Frontier Force) ==
Subsequent to the reforms brought about in the Indian Army by Lord Kitchener in 1903, the regiment's designation was changed to 54th Sikhs (Frontier Force). In 1914, the regiment's class composition was four companies of Sikhs, two of Punjabi Muslims, and one each of Pathans and Dogras. During the First World War, the regiment remained deployed on the North West Frontier of India. In 1918, it moved to Egypt to take part in the Palestine Campaign and fought in the Battle of Megiddo, which led to the annihilation of Turkish Army in Palestine. After serving in the Russian Transcaucasia and Turkey, it returned to India in 1920. In 1917, the 54th Sikhs raised a second battalion, which served in the Third Afghan War of 1919. The 2/54th Sikhs was disbanded soon after.

== Subsequent History ==
After the First World War, the 54th Sikhs were grouped with the 51st, 52nd and 53rd Sikhs, and the two battalions of Guides Infantry to form the 12th Frontier Force Regiment in 1922. The 54th Sikhs became 4th Battalion (Sikhs) of the new regiment. During the Second World War, 4/12 FF served with great distinction in the Burma Campaign 2 very distinguished officers from the Battalion were Maj (Later Field Marshal) Sam Maneckshaw of the Indian Army and Maj (Later Lt Gen) Attiq ur Rahman of the Pakistan Army, both winners of the Military Cross. In 1947, the Frontier Force Regiment was allotted to Pakistan Army. In 1956, the Frontier Force Rifles and the Pathan Regiment were merged with the Frontier Force Regiment, and 4/12 FF was redesignated as 6 FF. During the Indo-Pakistan War of 1965, the battalion distinguished itself the advance towards Akhnur and then in the Battle of Chawinda. In 1971, 6 FF served at Sulemanki, where Major Shabbir Sharif was awarded the Nishan-i-Haider, Pakistan's highest gallantry award for valour. Maj Shabbir Shareef's brother Raheel Shareef was later Commissioned into the Battalion and rose to the rank of General and became the COS of the Pakistan Army. The battalion has the distinction of having a field marshal, albeit in the Indian Army, Sam Manekshaw who was commissioned in the 4th/12th FFR in 1934, later winning a Military Cross in 1942 in the Burma campaign during World War II.

== Genealogy ==
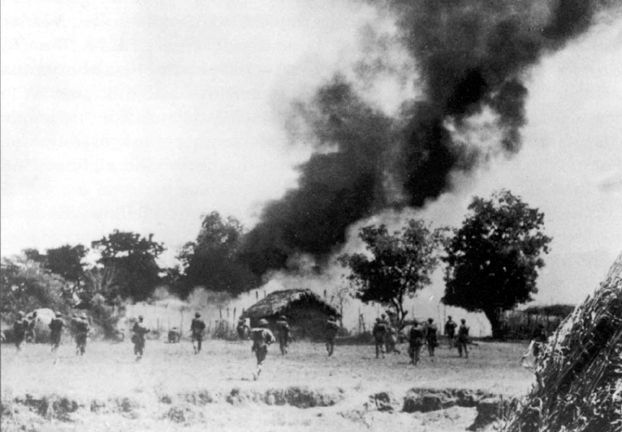
4th Battalion 12th Frontier Force Regiment attacking the village of Seywa, Burma, during the Battle of Meiktila, 1945.

- 1846 4th Regiment of Infantry The Frontier Brigade
- 1847 4th Regiment of Sikh Local Infantry
- 1857 4th Regiment of Sikh Infantry
- 1857 4th Regiment of Sikh Infantry, Punjab Irregular Force
- 1865 4th Regiment of Sikh Infantry, Punjab Frontier Force
- 1901 4th Sikh Infantry
- 1903 54th Sikhs (Frontier Force)
- 1922 4th Battalion (Sikhs) 12th Frontier Force Regiment
- 1945 4th Battalion (Sikhs) The Frontier Force Regiment
- 1947 4th Battalion The Frontier Force Regiment
- 1956 6th Battalion The Frontier Force Regiment

== See also ==
- The Frontier Force Regiment
- 12th Frontier Force Regiment
- Punjab Irregular Force
