= 56th Punjabi Rifles (Frontier Force) =

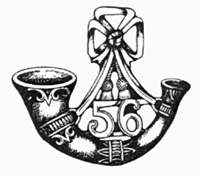
- Active: 1849 - 1922
- Country: British India
- Branch: British Indian Army
- Type: Infantry
- Size: 2 Battalions
- Nickname(s): Bhaiband
- Uniform: Drab; faced black
- Engagements: North West Frontier of India; Indian Mutiny 1857-58; Second Afghan War 1878-80; First World War 1914-18; Third Afghan War 1919

The 56th Punjabi Rifles (Frontier Force) was an infantry regiment of the British Indian Army. It was raised in 1849 as the 2nd Regiment of Punjab Infantry. It was designated as the 56th Punjabi Rifles (Frontier Force) in 1906 and became 2nd Battalion 13th Frontier Force Rifles in 1922. In 1947, it was allocated to the Pakistan Army, where it continues to exist as 8th Battalion The Frontier Force Regiment.

== Early history ==
The regiment was raised on 18 May 1849 by Lieutenant JC Johnston at Mianwali as part of the Transfrontier Brigade. In 1851, the brigade was expanded and redesignated as the Punjab Irregular Force, which later became famous as the Punjab Frontier Force or The Piffers. The Piffers consisted of five regiments of cavalry, eleven regiments of infantry and five batteries of artillery besides the Corps of Guides. Their mission was to maintain order on the Punjab Frontier; a task they performed with great aplomb. The 2nd Punjab Infantry took part in numerous frontier operations besides the Great Indian Mutiny of 1857-58, when took part in Siege of Delhi, the Siege and Capture of Lucknow, the Battle of Cawnpore, the Rohilkhand Campaign and the capture of Bareilly. During the Second Afghan War of 1878-80, the regiment fought in the Battle of Peiwar Kotal. In 1897, it took part in the Tirah Campaign.

== 56th Punjabi Rifles (Frontier Force) ==
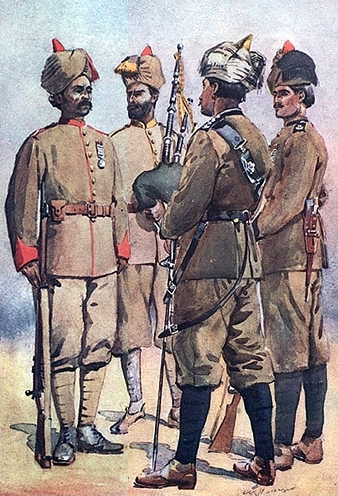
"Frontier Force". Left to right: 59th Scinde Rifles, 51st Sikhs and 56th Punjabi Rifles. Watercolour by Major AC Lovett, 1910.

Subsequent to the reforms brought about in the Indian Army by Lord Kitchener in 1903, the regiment's designation was first changed to 56th Infantry (Frontier Force) and then in 1906, to 56th Punjabi Rifles (Frontier Force). In 1914, the regiment's class composition was two companies each of Dogras, Pathans, Sikhs, and Punjabi Muslims. During the First World War, the regiment served throughout with the 28th Indian Brigade. In 1915, it served in Egypt and Aden (Yemen), moving to Mesopotamia in December. Here, it fought with great gallantry in the bloody battles for the Relief of Kut al Amara on the Tigris Front in 1916-17, the capture of Baghdad and in operations north of Baghdad at Istabulat, Daur and Tikrit. In 1918, the regiment moved to Palestine and took part in the Battle of Megiddo, which led to the annihilation of the Turkish Army in Palestine. It returned to India in 1920. In 1917, the 56th Punjabi Rifles raised a second battalion, which served in the Third Afghan War of 1919. The regiment's total casualties during the war were 1679, including 389 killed or died of wounds.

== Subsequent History ==
After the First World War, the two battalions of 56th Punjabi Rifles were grouped with the 55th, 57th, 58th and 59th Scinde Rifles (Frontier Force) to form the 13th Frontier Force Rifles in 1922. The 1st Battalion 56th Punjabi Rifles became the 2nd Battalion, while 2nd Battalion 56th Punjabi Rifles became the 10th (Training) Battalion of the new regiment. During the Second World War, the battalion served with distinction in the Burma Campaign. In 1947, the Frontier Force Rifles was allotted to Pakistan Army. In 1948, 2 FF Rifles fought in the Kashmir War against India. In 1956, the Frontier Force Rifles and the Pathan Regiment were merged with the Frontier Force Regiment, and 2 FF Rifles was redesignated as 8 FF. During the Indo-Pakistan War of 1965, the battalion served in the Rann of Kutch and Rajasthan Sector.

== Genealogy ==
- 1849 2nd Regiment of Punjab Infantry
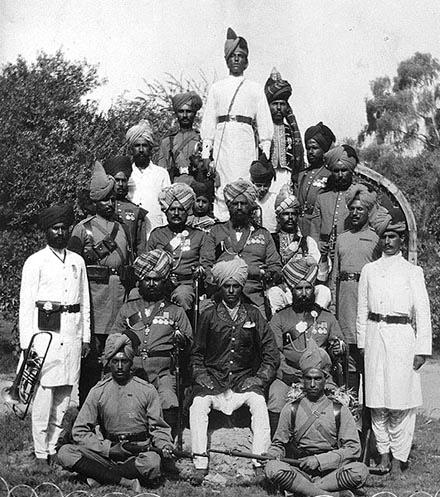
  56th Infantry (Frontier Force), 1905.
- 1851 2nd Regiment of Infantry, Punjab Irregular Force
- 1865 2nd Regiment of Infantry, Punjab Frontier Force
- 1901 2nd Punjab Infantry
- 1903 56th Infantry (Frontier Force)
- 1906 56th Punjabi Rifles (Frontier Force)
- 1917 1st Battalion 56th Punjabi Rifles (Frontier Force)
- 1922 2nd Battalion 13th Frontier Force Rifles
- 1945 2nd Battalion The Frontier Force Rifles
- 1956 8th Battalion The Frontier Force Regiment

== See also ==
- The Frontier Force Regiment
- 13th Frontier Force Rifles
- Punjab Irregular Force
