= Alfred Thomas Wilde =

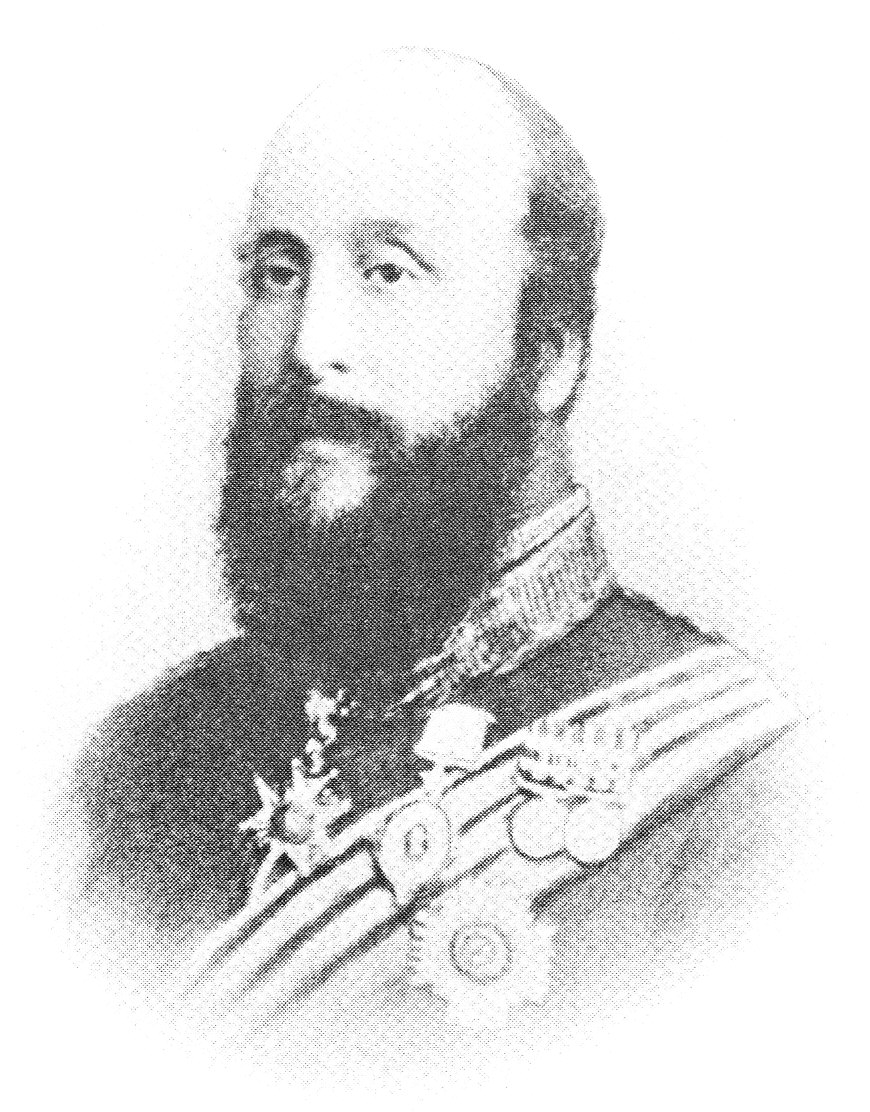
Major-General Sir Alfred Thomas Wilde, KCB, CSI, circa 1869

Lieutenant-General Sir Alfred Thomas Wilde, KCB, CSI (1 November 1819–1878) was a British military officer in India.

Of Kirby Cane Hall, Bungay, Wilde was the third son of Edward Archer Wilde, solicitor, of College Hill, Queen Street, London, by Marianne, daughter of William Norris. He was a brother of Lord Penzance and nephew of Lord Chancellor Truro. Educated at Winchester College, where he was a commoner from 1834 to 1837, he obtained a commission as ensign in the East India Company's army on 12 December 1838, and joined the 15th Madras Native Infantry in April 1839. He was transferred to the 19th Madras Native Infantry in June, was promoted to be lieutenant on 9 July 1842, qualified as interpreter in Hindustani in March 1843, and served with his regiment through the disturbances which occurred that year on the Malabar coast.

In January 1847 Wilde was appointed adjutant, and in February quartermaster and interpreter to his regiment. In March 1850 he was transferred to the adjutancy of the 3rd Punjab infantry, and qualified as interpreter in Telugu. In April 1851 he was appointed second in command of the 4th Punjab Infantry, and was in command of the regiment and other troops at the occupation of the Bahadur Khel valley, Kohut District, in November, receiving the thanks of government for defeating a night attack of a body of Waziris upon the fort of Bahadur Khel. He succeeded to the command of the regiment on 21 February 1853. He was promoted to be brevet captain on 12 December, took part in the attack and capture of the village of Allah-dad-Khan in 1854, was promoted to be captain on 23 November 1856, and was thanked by the government of India for valuable service in the great inundation of the Indus in that year.

In March 1857 Wilde commanded the 4th Punjab infantry in the expedition under Brigadier (afterwards Sir) Neville Chamberlain against the Bozdar Baluchis, who were totally defeated, and also throughout the Indian mutiny. He was at the siege of Delhi, and in the storming parties which captured the Delhi magazine and palace on 16 and 20 Sept., when he was wounded. He took part in the actions of Gangari, Pattiali, and Mainpuri in December, and in that of Shamsabad on 27 January 1858. He was promoted to be brevet major for his services at Delhi on 19 January, and was thanked by government.

Wilde commanded his regiment in the first victorious assault on the entrenchments in front of Lucknow, at the siege of that place in March 1858, led a storming party at the capture of the Begum's palace on the 14th, and was severely wounded on the 21st at the attack on Goal Masjid, in the heart of the city. This secured the capture of Lucknow, and in May he went on leave to England to recruit his health. He was mentioned in despatches, promoted to be brevet lieutenant-colonel on 20 July, made a Companion of the Order of the Bath, military division, on 16 November, and received the medal with two clasps.

Wilde returned to India in 1859. In March 1860 he commanded his regiment in the expedition against the Mahsud Waziris, and was thanked for his services. He was promoted to be regimental major on 18 February 1861, and on 3 March 1862 he was appointed commandant of the corps of guides, and commanded them in the expedition to Ambala against the Sitana and Mandi fanatics in 1863. On 20 July he was promoted to be colonel in the army, made an aide-de-camp to the Queen, and was given the command of the second brigade of the Usafzai field force, which destroyed the villages of Sitana and Mandi. He was promoted to be regimental lieutenant-colonel on 12 December 1864, and on 8 February in the following year succeeded to the command of the Punjab irregular force with the rank of brigadier-general.

On 12 June 1866 Wilde was made a Companion of the Order of the Star of India. In 1868 he commanded the field force in the Hazara Black Mountain expedition, received the thanks of government for his services, and the medal and clasp. He was promoted to be a Knight Commander of the order of the Bath, military division, on 2 June 1869, and to be a major-general on 18 July. On his final return from India in 1871 a good-service pension was bestowed upon him. In 1877 he was appointed a member of the Council of India, and promoted lieutenant-general on 1 October 1877. He died on 7 February 1878. Wilde married, in 1866, Ellen Margaret, third daughter of Colonel Godfrey T. Greene, C.B., Royal (late Bengal) Engineers.
