= 20th Battalion, Frontier Force Regiment =

20th Frontier Force
- Active: October 1, 1965
- Country: Pakistan
- Branch: Army
- Type: Infantry
- Role: Mechanized Infantry
- Garrison/HQ: Tobe Camp Kakul
- Motto(s): Tayyar Hardam Tayyar
- Engagements: Pak-Indo War 1965; Pak-Indo War 1971

Commanders
- Raised by: Lt Col Anwar ul Haq

The 20th Frontier Force is a battalion of the Frontier Force Regiment, a regiment of the Pakistan Army formed in 1956 from the amalgamation of three regiments: the Frontier Force Regiment, the Frontier Force Rifles, and the Pathan Regiment. The regimental center is at Abbottabad.

== Establishment ==
20 FF was established at Tobe camp Kakul on October 1, 1965, with Lieutenant Colonel Anwar ul Haq as its first Commanding Officer. 20 FF was converted to armored infantry by Lt. Colonel (later Brig.) Muneeb ur Rehman Farooqui.

== Deployments ==
The battalion took active part in the battles of 1965 and 1971.

=== Wartime Deployment ===
- 1965 - Chawinda
- 1971 - Langewala

== See also ==
- United Nations Mission in Liberia
- Frontier Force Regiment
