= 58th Vaughan's Rifles (Frontier Force) =

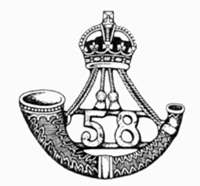
- Active: 1849–1922
- Country: British India
- Branch: British Indian Army
- Type: Infantry
- Size: 1 Battalion
- Nickname(s): Dasturi; Vaughan ki Paltan
- Uniform: Drab; faced emerald green
- Engagements: North West Frontier of India; Indian Mutiny 1857–59; Second Afghan War 1878–80; First World War 1914–18

The 58th Vaughan's Rifles (Frontier Force) was an infantry regiment of the British Indian Army. It was raised in 1849 as the 5th Regiment of Punjab Infantry. It was designated as the 58th Vaughan's Rifles (Frontier Force) in 1903 and became 5th Battalion 13th Frontier Force Rifles in 1922. In 1947, it was allocated to the Pakistan Army, where it continues to exist as 10th Battalion The Frontier Force Regiment.

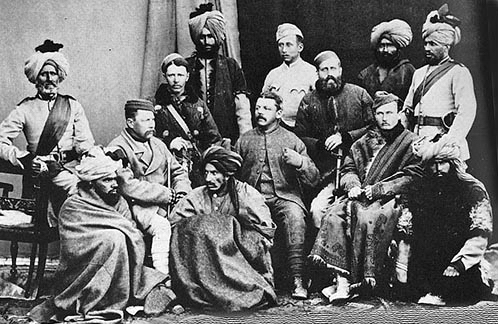
5th Punjab Infantry, Punjab Frontier Force, 1878.

== Early history ==
The regiment was raised on 18 May 1849 by Captain JE Gastrell at Leiah as part of the Transfrontier Brigade. In 1851, the brigade was expanded and redesignated as the Punjab Irregular Force, which later became famous as the Punjab Frontier Force or The Piffers. The Piffers consisted of five regiments of cavalry, eleven regiments of infantry and five batteries of artillery besides the Corps of Guides. Their mission was to maintain order on the Punjab Frontier; a task they performed with great aplomb. The 5th Punjab Infantry took part in numerous frontier operations besides the Great Indian Mutiny of 1857–58, when it operated in Oudh and Nepal. During the Second Afghan War of 1878–80, the regiment fought in the Battle of Peiwar Kotal and took part in the defence of Sherpur Cantonment at Kabul. In 1897, it took part in the Tirah Campaign.

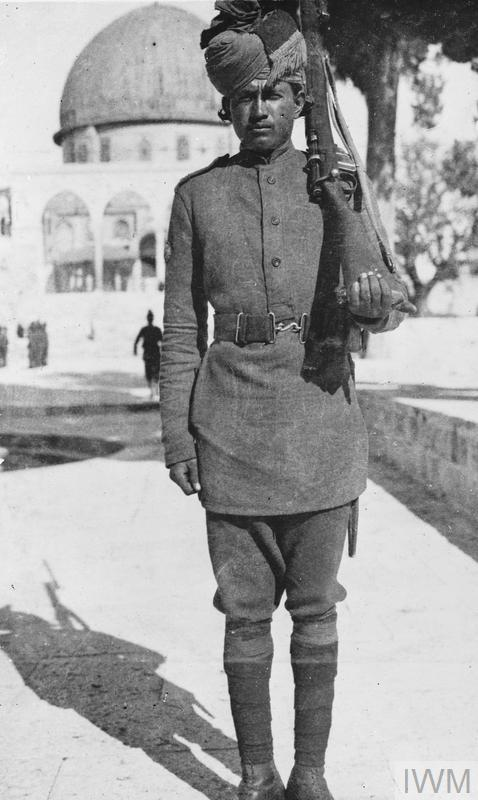
A sentry from 58th Vaughan's Rifles (Frontier Force), 75th Division guards over the Dome of the Rock, Jerusalem, during the Sinai and Palestine Campaign, 1915-1918

== 58th Vaughan's Rifles (Frontier Force) ==
Subsequent to the reforms brought about in the Indian Army by Lord Kitchener in 1903, the regiment's designation was changed to 58th Vaughan's Rifles (Frontier Force). In 1914, the regiment's class composition was three companies each of Pathans and Sikhs, and one company each of Dogras and Punjabi Muslims. During the First World War, the regiment served on the Western Front in 1914–15, fighting in the Battles of Givenchy-les-la-Bassee, Neuve Chapelle, Aubers Ridge and Loos. In 1915, it served in Egypt moving to Palestine in 1917, where it fought in the Third Battle of Gaza, the Battle of Nebi Samwil and the Capture of Jerusalem. In 1918, it fought in the Battle of Megiddo, which led to the annihilation of Turkish Army in Palestine.

== Subsequent History ==
After the First World War, the 58th Vaughan's Rifles (Frontier Force) was grouped with the 55th, 57th, 59th, and the two battalions of 56th Punjabi Rifles (Frontier Force) to form the 13th Frontier Force Rifles in 1922. The 58th Vaughan's Rifles became 5th Battalion of the new regiment. During the Second World War, the battalion served in Iraq, Iran, Lebanon, North Africa and Italy. In 1947, the Frontier Force Rifles was allotted to Pakistan Army. In 1948, 5 FF Rifles fought in the Kashmir War against India. In 1956, the Frontier Force Rifles and the Pathan Regiment were merged with the Frontier Force Regiment, and 5 FF Rifles was redesignated as 10 FF. During the Indo-Pakistan War of 1965, the battalion fought in the Battle of Khem Karan in the Kasur Sector.

== Genealogy ==
- 1849 5th Regiment of Punjab Infantry
- 1851 5th Regiment of Infantry, Punjab Irregular Force
- 1865 5th Regiment of Infantry, Punjab Frontier Force
- 1901 5th Punjab Infantry
- 1903 58th Vaughan's Rifles (Frontier Force)
- 1922 5th Battalion (Vaughan's) 13th Frontier Force Rifles
- 1945 5th Battalion (Vaughan's) The Frontier Force Rifles
- 1956 10th Battalion The Frontier Force Regiment

== See also ==
- Mir Mast Afridi (soldier of the 58th Vaughan's Rifles who defected to Germany)
- The Frontier Force Regiment
- 13th Frontier Force Rifles
- Punjab Irregular Force
