= Henry William Pitcher =

English recipient of the Victoria Cross

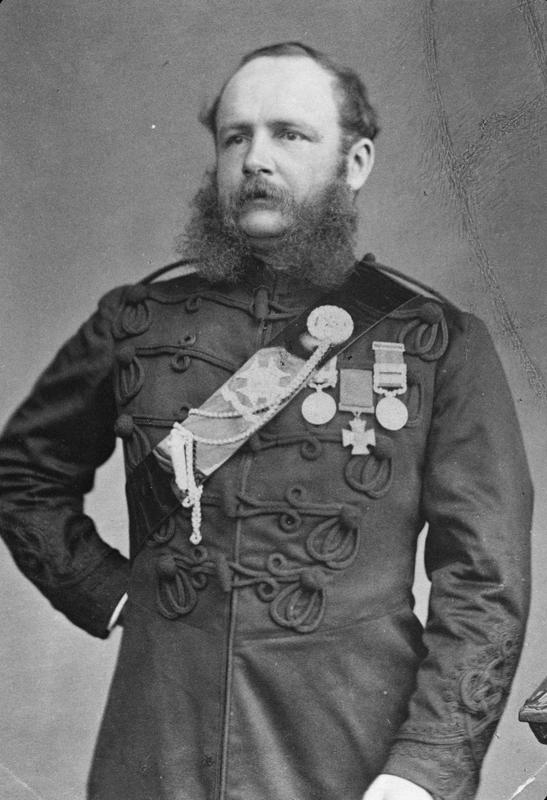
- Henry Pitcher wearing the uniform of a Bengal Staff Corps officer, his Victoria Cross and campaign medals
- Born: 20 December 1841; Kamptee, British India
- Died: 5 July 1875 (aged 33); Dehra Ghazi Khan, British India
- Burial place: Dehra Ismail Khan Cemetery, Kohat
- Military career
- Allegiance: United Kingdom
- Branch: British Indian Army
- Rank: Captain
- Units: Bengal Staff Corps
- Conflicts: Indian Mutiny; Umbeyla Campaign
- Awards: Victoria Cross

Henry William Pitcher VC (20 December 1841 – 5 July 1875) was an English recipient of the Victoria Cross.

== Details ==
Pitcher was born at Kamptee in British India, the second son of Vincent Pitcher and Rose Mary le Geyt, daughter of Admiral George le Geyt. His elder brother Colonel Duncan George Pitcher also served in India.

He was about 22 years old and a lieutenant in the Bengal Staff Corps, 4th Punjab Infantry, British Indian Army during the Umbeyla Campaign. On 30 October 1863 in North-West India, Lieutenant Pitcher led a party to recapture the Crag Picquet after its garrison had been driven in by the enemy and sixty of them killed. He led the party up the narrow path to the last rock until he was knocked down and stunned by a large stone thrown from above. On 16 November, the lieutenant displayed great courage in leading a party to the Crag Picquet when it had again fallen into enemy hands. He led the first charge, but was wounded in the action. For this deed he was awarded the Victoria Cross.

He later achieved the rank of captain and died of heatstroke, while serving with the 1st Punjab Infantry, on 5 July 1875 at Dehra Ghazi Khan. His VC is on display in Jersey Museum.

== Early life ==
Pitcher is one of five that attended Victoria College, Jersey whom were awarded the Victoria Cross. A replica is on display opposite the Headmasters office in The Main Building.
