= 59th Scinde Rifles (Frontier Force) =

59th Scinde Rifles (Frontier Force) 59 اسڪينڊ رائفلز (فرنٽيئر فورس)
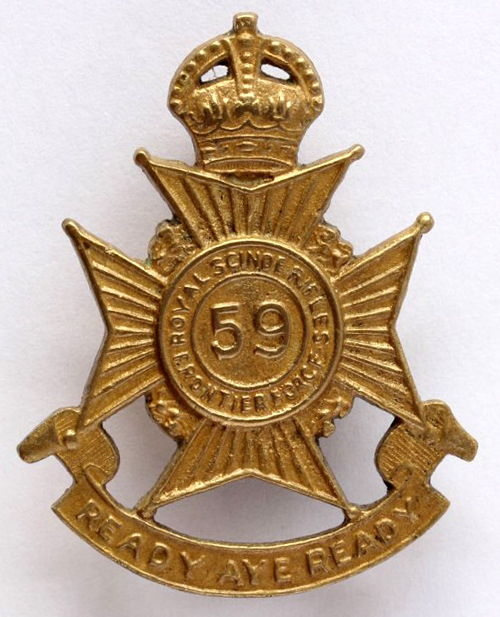
- Active: 1843–present
- Country: British India; Pakistan
- Branch: British Indian Army; Pakistan Army
- Type: Mechanized Infantry
- Size: 1 Battalion
- Nickname: Garbar Unath
- Motto: "Ready Aye Ready"
- Uniform: Drab; faced scarlet
- Anniversaries: 10 March - Nueve Chapple Day
- Engagements: North West Frontier of India; Indian Mutiny 1857–58; First World War 1914–18; Second World War 1939–1945; 1965 War; 1971 War

Commanders
- Notable commanders: Gen Musa Khan, HPk, HJ, HQA, MBE, Lt Gen Bakhtiar Rana,MC Lt Gen Rakhman Gul,MC Lt Gen AI Akram, Lt Gen Moinuddin Haider, HI (M)Lt Gen Ayaz, Maj Gen Sadaqat Ali Shah, Lt Gen Aamer Riaz, Maj Gen Nadir Khan

The 59th Scinde Rifles (Frontier Force) was an infantry regiment of the British Indian Army. It was raised in 1843, as the Scinde Camel Corps. In 1856, it was incorporated into the Punjab Irregular Force (PIF). It was designated as the 59th Scinde Rifles (Frontier Force) in 1904 and became 6th Royal Battalion (Scinde) 13th Frontier Force Rifles in 1922. In 1947, it was allocated to the Pakistan Army, where it continues to exist as 1st Battalion The Frontier Force Regiment.

== Early history ==
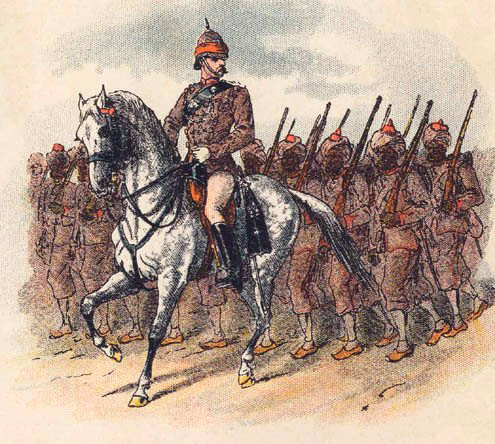
6th Regiment of Punjab Infantry, Punjab Frontier Force. Coloured lithograph by Richard Simkin, 1886.

The regiment was raised on 1 December 1843 by Lieutenant Robert Fitzgerald at Karachi as the Scinde Camel Corps. The corps consisting of camel-mounted infantry was entrusted with keeping the peace on the Sindh frontier. In 1853, it was designated as the 6th Regiment of Punjab Infantry and became part of the Punjab Irregular Force, which later became famous as the Punjab Frontier Force or The Piffers. The Piffers consisted of five regiments of cavalry, eleven regiments of infantry and five batteries of artillery besides the Corps of Guides. Their mission was to maintain order on the Punjab Frontier; a task they performed with great aplomb. Over the next fifty years, the 6th Punjab Infantry took part in numerous frontier operations. It was also engaged in operations during the Indian Mutiny of 1857–58.

== 59th Scinde Rifles (Frontier Force) ==
Subsequent to the reforms brought about in the Indian Army by Lord Kitchener in 1903, the regiment's designation was changed to 59th Scinde Rifles (Frontier Force). In 1914, the regiment's class composition was three companies of Pathans, two companies each of Sikhs and Dogras, and one company of Punjabi Muslims.

During the First World War, the regiment served with great gallantry on the Western Front in 1914–15, fighting in the Battles of Givenchy, Neuve Chapelle, Aubers Ridge, the Second Battle of Ypres and the Battle of Loos. Lieutenant William Bruce was awarded the Victoria Cross during the Battle of Givenchy. In 1916, the regiment arrived in Mesopotamia. Here, it fought in the bloody battles for the Relief of Kut al Amara on the Tigris Front in 1916–17, the capture of Baghdad, and in operations north of Baghdad at Daur and Tikrit. For its gallant conduct during the war, it was made a "Royal" battalion in 1921. Soldiers of the 59th Scinde Rifles formed part of the command of Brigadier General Reginald Dyer which fired into the crowd at the Jallianwala Bagh massacre.

== Subsequent history ==
Havildar of 59th Scinde Rifles (Frontier Force). A Punjabi Muslim in WW1 dress, the turban no longer has the red fringe but retains the red kullah. Painting by William Luker Jr, 1918.

After the First World War, the 59th Royal Scinde Rifles (Frontier Force) was grouped with the 55th, 57th, 58th, and the two battalions of 56th Punjabi Rifles (Frontier Force) to form the 13th Frontier Force Rifles in 1922. The 59th Royal Scinde Rifles became the 6th Battalion of the new regiment.

During the Second World War, the battalion again greatly distinguished itself, serving in the Sudan, Eritrea, North Africa, Persia, Iraq, Syria, Palestine, and Italy. Sepoy Ali Haider was awarded the Victoria Cross during the Battle of the Senio, in Italy in 1945.

In 1947, the Frontier Force Rifles was allotted to Pakistan Army. In 1948, 6 Royal FF Rifles fought in the Kashmir War against India. In 1956, the Frontier Force Rifles and the Pathan Regiment were merged with the Frontier Force Regiment, and 6th Royal Battalion The Frontier Force Rifles was redesignated as 1st Battalion The Frontier Force Regiment. During the Indo-Pakistan War of 1965, the battalion fought in the Battle of Khem Karan in the Kasur Sector.

The unit got the nickname of "Garbar" given by a British general at Karachi Harbour in 1939.

== Genealogy ==
- 1843 Scinde Camel Corps
- 1853 Scinde Rifle Corps
- 1856 6th Punjab Infantry
- 1904 59 Scinde Rifles (Frontier Force)
- 1921 59th Royal Scinde Rifles (Frontier Force)
- 1922 6th Royal Battalion (Scinde) 13th Frontier Force Rifles
- 1945 6th Royal Battalion (Scinde) The Frontier Force Rifles
- 1956 1st Battalion (Scinde) The Frontier Force Regiment

== See also ==
- The Frontier Force Regiment
- 13th Frontier Force Rifles
- Punjab Irregular Force
