= 55th Coke's Rifles (Frontier Force) =

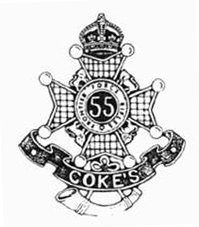
- Active: 1849–1922
- Country: British India
- Branch: British Indian Army
- Type: Infantry
- Size: 1 Battalion
- Nickname: Coke Paltan
- Uniform: Dark green; scarlet piping
- Anniversaries: 18 May 1849
- Engagements: North West Frontier of India; Indian Mutiny 1857–58; Second Afghan War 1878–80; First World War 1914–18; Third Afghan War 1919

Commanders
- Notable commanders: Lt Gen Bahadur Sher, Lt Gen Agha Ibrahim Akram, Lt Gen Munier Hafeez, Lt Gen Ahmed Kamal Khan, Maj Gen Iqbal Akbar Khan, Maj Gen Muhammad Jaffar Awan HI (M), Maj Gen Shehryar Munier Hafeez

The 55th Coke's Rifles (Frontier Force) was a regiment of the British Indian Army. It was raised in 1849 as the 1st Regiment of Punjab Infantry. It was designated as the 55th Coke's Rifles (Frontier Force) in 1903 and became 1st Battalion (Coke's) 13th Frontier Force Rifles in 1922. In 1947, it was allocated to the Pakistan Army, where it continues to exist as 7th Battalion The Frontier Force Regiment.

== History ==
=== 1849–1880 ===
The regiment was formed on 18 May 1849 as the 1st Regiment of Punjab Infantry by Captain John Coke. It was one of five such regiments raised by Colonel Henry Lawrence, the agent (and brother) of the Governor-General of the Punjab frontier region, John Lawrence, 1st Baron Lawrence, to form the infantry element of the Trans Frontier Brigade. The men were recruited from veterans of disbanded opposition forces after the British annexation in 1848 of the Punjab during the Second Sikh War. In 1851 the regiment was retitled as the 1st Regiment of Infantry, Punjab Irregular Force when the Trans Frontier Brigade, tasked with policing the volatile North-West Frontier, was expanded and renamed the Punjab Irregular Force (PIF), giving rise to the "Piffer" name adopted by the officers and men of the regiments of the PIF and still used to this day by their successor regiments.

In 1857 the Indian Mutiny began and the regiment, like many other Indian units, remained loyal to the British. During the British-Indian siege of rebel-held Delhi (begun on 30 May) the 1st Punjab Infantry was part of the 3rd Column, commanded by Col. Campbell. On 14 September the column was tasked with storming the Kashmiri Gate—a part of the walled defences of Delhi—which they successfully achieved. Fierce fighting, however, ensued and Delhi was not fully retaken until 20 September. The rebellion was finally quelled by July 1858.

In 1863 the 1st Punjab Infantry took part in the Umbeyla campaign in the North-West Frontier. At the Crag Picquet the regiment saw fierce fighting on 30 October, to such an extent that the regiment was compelled to withdraw from the hill; it was retaken shortly afterwards and two Victoria Crosses (VC) were later awarded. One of the VC recipients was Henry William Pitcher of the 4th Punjabis, who later joined the 1st Punjab Infantry and was killed in 1875 at Dera Ghazi Khan. Further fighting took place at Crag Picquet in November, which involved the regiment. In 1865 the Punjab Irregular Force was renamed the Punjab Frontier Force and the regiment's title was consequently changed to become the 1st Regiment of Infantry, Punjab Frontier Force.

In 1878, the Second Afghan War began and the regiment participated as part of the 2nd Infantry Brigade of the Kandahar Field Force, commanded by Lieutenant-General Sir Donald Stewart. The force captured the city of Kandahar on 8 January 1879. The regiment was awarded the Theatre Honour "Afghanistan 1878–79" for their participation in the initial campaign of the war. The conflict did not conclude until 1880.

=== 1880–1922 ===
The 1890s saw the 1st Punjab Infantry involved in several major operations against the hostile tribes on the North-West Frontier of India. These included Maizar, and Waziristan on 10 June 1897, when the regiment was ambushed in an action that signified the beginning of a large tribal uprising against the British. The beginning of the 20th century gave the regiment no respite, and it took part in further operations in Waziristan in 1901. That same year it became, simply, the 1st Punjab Infantry. In 1903, the regiment was designated a rifle regiment and retitled as the 55th Coke's Rifles (Frontier Force), named in honour of the regiment's founder. In 1908, the Regiment took part in the Mohmand expedition on the North-West Frontier.

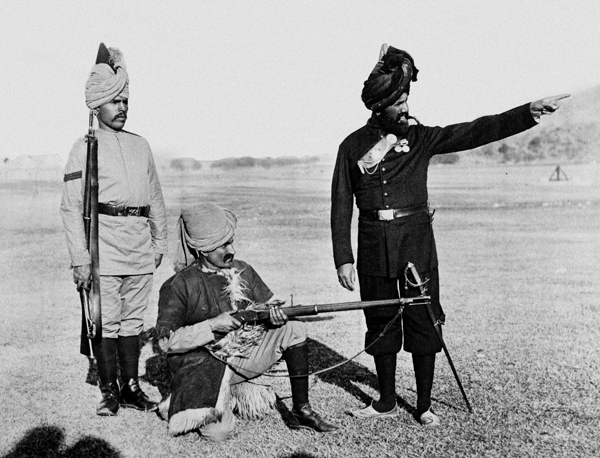
1st Regiment of Punjab Infantry, Punjab Frontier Force, 1889. Punjabi Musalman Naik, Dogra Lance Naik and Yusufzai Havildar

The 55th did not serve abroad during the First World War but the regiment—which comprised companies of Afridis, Punjabi Musulmans, Sikhs and Yusufzais—saw active service on the North-West Frontier for the duration of the war, fighting many of the numerous marauding tribes that populated the area. Many men of the regiment did, however, see service abroad during the war while attached to other units. In 1915, Jemadar Mir Dast, while attached to the 57th Wilde's Rifles (Frontier Force), was awarded the 55th's first (and only) Victoria Cross for his distinguished actions at Wieltie, Belgium. Mir Dast's brother, Mir Mast, had deserted from his regiment—the 58th—to the Germans. It is rumoured that Mir Mast received the Iron Cross while fighting for them.

=== 1922–47 ===
In 1921–22, a major reorganization was undertaken in the British Indian Army leading to the formation of large infantry groups of four to six battalions. Among these was the 13th Frontier Force Rifles, formed by grouping the 55th Coke's Rifles with the 1st and 2nd Battalions of the 56th Punjabi Rifles, the 57th Wilde's Rifles, 58th Vaughan's Rifles and 59th Scinde Rifles (Frontier Force). The Coke's new designation was 1st Battalion (Coke's) 13th Frontier Force Rifles. The 55th's uniform of rifle green colour was adopted as the uniform of the new regiment.

During the Second World War, the 1/13th Frontier Force Rifles (Coke's) was part of the 9th Indian Division based on the west coast of Malaya. The battalion fought in the disastrous Malayan Campaign against the Japanese, which led to the surrender of British forces at Singapore on 15 February 1942. The battalion was re-raised in 1946. In 1945, 13th Frontier Force Rifles dropped its regimental number "13" to become Frontier Force Rifles.

=== 1947 onwards ===
Upon the independence in 1947, the Frontier Force Rifles was allotted to Pakistan Army. In 1948, 1 FF Rifles fought in the Kashmir War against India. The battalion fought with great gallantry at Chakothi in the Jhelum Valley, and foiled all Indian attempts to advance towards Muzaffarabad. In 1956, the Frontier Force Rifles and the Pathan Regiment were merged with the Frontier Force Regiment, and 1 FF Rifles was redesignated as 7th Battalion (Coke's) The Frontier Force Regiment or 7 FF. During the Indo-Pakistan War of 1965, the battalion again distinguished itself in the Battle of Chawinda.

== Battle Honours ==
Delhi 1857, Lucknow, Peiwar Kotal, Charasiah, Kabul 1879, Afghanistan 1878–80, Tirah, Punjab Frontier, China 1900, La Bassée 1914, Messines 1914, Armentières 1914, Festubert 1914, Givenchy 1914, Neuve Chapelle, Ypres 1915, St. Julien, Aubers, Festubert 1915, Loos, France and Flanders 1914–15, Suez Canal, Egypt 1915–17, Gaza, El Mughar, Nebi Samwil, Jerusalem, Megiddo, Sharon, Palestine 1917–18, Tigris 1916, Kut al Amara 1917, Baghdad, Mesopotamia 1916–18, Persia 1918–19, Aden, East Africa 1916–18, NW Frontier India 1917, Baluchistan 1918, Afghanistan 1919, North Malaya, Kota Bahru, Johore, Gemas, The Muar, Singapore Island, Malaya 1941–42, Kashmir 1948, Lahore 1965

== See also ==
- The Frontier Force Regiment
- 13th Frontier Force Rifles
- Punjab Irregular Force
