= 4th Punjab Infantry Regiment =

4th Punjab Infantry
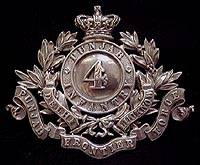
- Active: 1849–present
- Country: British India (1849-1947); Pakistan (1947-)
- Branch: British Indian Army; Pakistan Army
- Type: Infantry
- Size: 1 Battalion
- Motto: Barhe Challo
- Uniform: Drab; faced blue; blue collars & cuffs
- Engagements: North West Frontier of India; Indian Mutiny 1857-58; Second Afghan War 1878-80; Boxer Rebellion 1900

Commanders
- Notable commanders: Major General AT Wilde, CB

The 4th Punjab Infantry Regiment was an infantry regiment of the British Indian Army formed on 18 April 1849 by Captain GG Denniss at Lahore as part of the Transfrontier Brigade, which became the Punjab Irregular Force (PIF) in 1851. The regiment was designated as the 57th Wilde's Rifles (Frontier Force) in 1903, and 4th Battalion (Wilde's) 13th Frontier Force Rifles in 1922. In 1947, it was allocated to the Pakistan Army, where it continues to exist as 9th Battalion The Frontier Force Regiment.

== Genealogy ==
Badge of 57th Wilde's Rifles (FF) 1903–22.

- 1849 4th Regiment of Punjab Infantry, Transfrontier Brigade (Denniss Ka Pultan)
- 1851 4th Regiment of Punjab Irregular Force
- 1865 4th Regiment of Infantry, Punjab Frontier Force
- 1901 4th Punjab Infantry
- 1903 57th Wilde's Rifles (Frontier Force)
- 1922 4th Battalion (Wilde's), 13th Frontier Force Rifles
- 1945 4th Battalion (Wilde's), The Frontier Force Rifles
- 1956 9th Battalion The Frontier Force Regiment

== Foundation ==
On the conclusion of the Second Anglo-Sikh War in 1849, when the Kingdom of Punjab was annexed by the British, 10 irregular regiments were formed, 5 cavalry and 5 infantry, from men who had served in the Sikh Army of the former Kingdom of Punjab, the so-called Khalsa Army, by order of Col. Henry Montgomery Lawrence, President of the newly created governing body, the Board of Administration of the Punjab. They were irregular as they were outside the regulations of the Regular Army of the Line in such matters as discipline, training, uniforms etc. These 5 regiments were thus some of the first to adopt khaki uniforms, known as drab, so suitable for the local barren landscape. The purpose of these regiments was to form together the Transfrontier Brigade, to maintain the frontier between the newly annexed territory and Afghanistan, known as the Northwest Frontier, which was subject to frequent breach by marauding warlike groups of Afghan tribesmen.
(See main article: North-West Frontier (military history))

== Recruitment & composition ==
Lt.Col.George Gladwin Denniss(1821–1862), 1st European Bengal Fusiliers, who raised the 4th Regiment of Punjab Infantry, Denniss Ka Pultan in 1849 at Lahore

The regiment was raised at Lahore, historic capital of the kingdom of Punjab, by Capt. George Gladwin Denniss II(1821–1862), of the 1st European Bengal Fusiliers, appointed on 18 April 1849. Capt. O. Marshall, however, of the Madras Native Infantry became its first commandant, resigning on 19 March 1850, from which time Denniss took command until 25 February 1851. The regiment consisted in the first instance of 60 trans-Indus Pathans, followers of Dewan Mulraj, who had delivered themselves up as prisoners to the British Government on the capture of Multan, 200 men of Sardar Dhara Singh's Regiment and 300 men of Col. Shere Singh's Regiment. A number of the Fateh Paltan also were, by order of Sir Henry Lawrence, drafted to the regiment. The regiment's subsequent commander Lt-Col. Wilde wrote in 1860:

I have no hesitation in asserting that duty is carried on in the (Regiment) as strictly as in the Line. Compared with the Sepoy of the Bengal Army, there is a marked difference in the address and manners of these Northern men, assimilating somewhat to the more manly bearing of our own Soldiers....I have never heard any officer accuse them of want of discipline or subordination, and I believe in no Native Army has a strict and ready obedience to the orders of their superiors been carried out with greater success....It was in this Force that the Pathan, Jatsikh and Dogra was first taught to serve in the ranks of the British Army; and it was in these Regiments that the Afreedees and other Afghan tribes were gradually reduced to obedience, and are now as well behaved as any of our Native Soldiery.

The earliest record of such an oath is that recorded by Capt. Wilde, when in command of the Regt., from 1853:

I....inhabitant of....son of....swear by the Gooroo Grunth Sahibjee (holy scripture of Sikhism) and if I tell a falsehood may the Gooroo Grunth Sahib cause misfortune to descend upon me, that I will never forsake or abandon my Colours, that I will march wherever I am directed whether within or beyond the Company's Territories, that I will implicitly obey all the orders of my Commanders, and in everything behave myself as becomes a good Soldier and faithful servant of the Company, and failing in any part of my duty as such I will submit to the penalties ascribed in the Articles of War, which have been read to me.

== First Action ==
The Regiment remained at Lahore until November 1850, the chief event of importance during this time being an inspection on 5 December 1849 by the Governor General, Lord Dalhousie. On 24 November 1850. the regiment, under the command of Capt. Denniss, marched from Lahore to Kohat via Shahpur and Kalabagh, through the Shakardarrah Pass, escorting 6 lakhs of rupees, arriving at Kohat on 8 February 1851. Shortly after their arrival the regiment was inspected by Brigadier Hodgson, commanding the Punjab Irregular Force. Denniss relinquished his command on 31 March 1851, to rejoin the 1st European Bengal Fusiliers, passing command to Capt. G.W.G.Bristow(1/4/51-21/10/52), thence to Capt. T.P.Walsh(22/10/52-20/2/53), thence to Capt. Alfred Thomas Wilde (21/2/53-10/3/62), who forms a central role in the history of the regiment.

== Wilde Appointed to Command ==
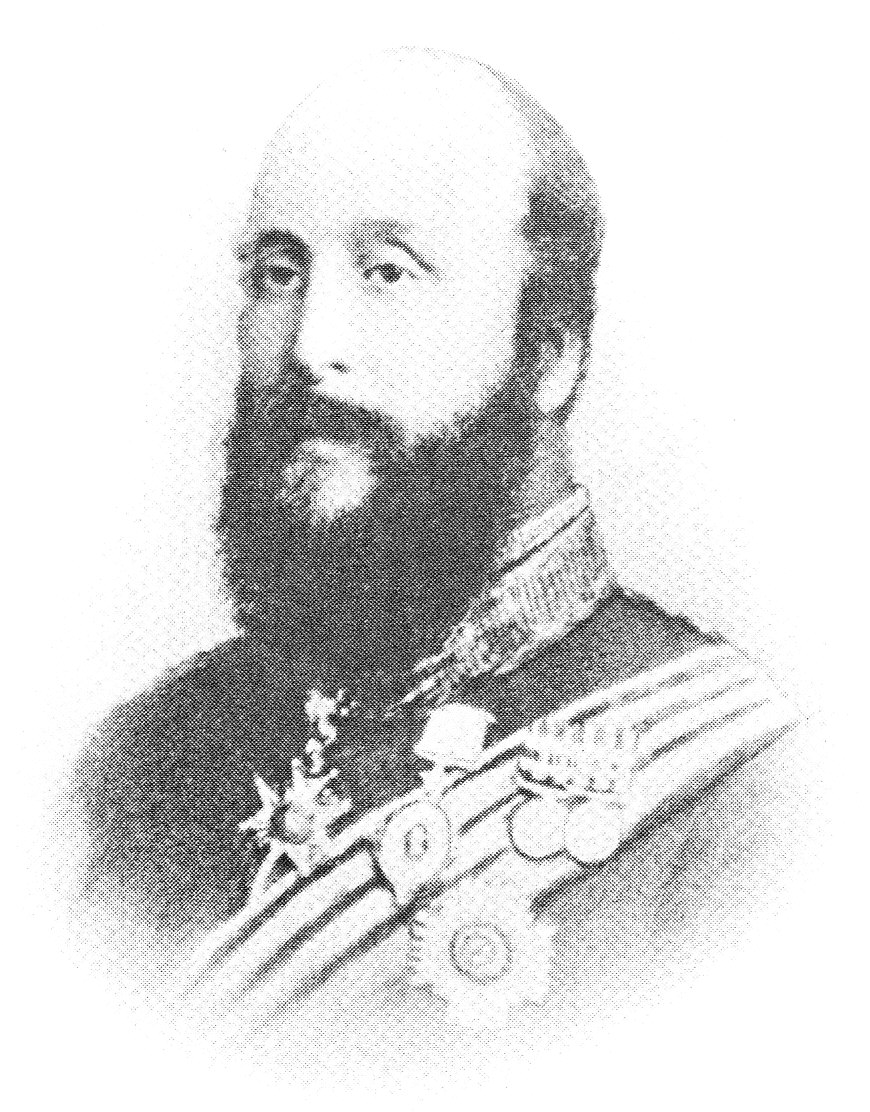
Major-General Sir Alfred Thomas Wilde, KCB, CSI, circa 1869

Lt. Alfred Thomas Wilde of the 19th Madras Infantry, whose name was given in 1903 to the regiment as part of its official title, was appointed second in command on 4 April 1851, and joined 4 days later, being appointed commandant on 19 November 1851.

== Service in Indian Mutiny ==
In 1857 the regiment was sent into action by John Lawrence, younger brother of Henry and Chief Commissioner of Punjab, as vital relief reinforcements during the Indian Mutiny. Under the command of Wilde, it marched with the rest of the Transfrontier Force 1,000 miles in summer from Bannu on the NW Frontier to Delhi. After the Siege of Delhi had been lifted with their great assistance, they moved onto the Siege of Lucknow and took part in the Capture of Lucknow, when they captured the Sikandar Bagh with the 93rd Highlanders. John Lawrence was hailed as the "Saviour of India" for his decisive action in sending the Punjab regiments to assist at Delhi. The tribesmen in these regiments remained loyal to the British during the Mutiny, as they had no affection for the Indian Sepoy, against whom they had fought during the Sikh Wars.

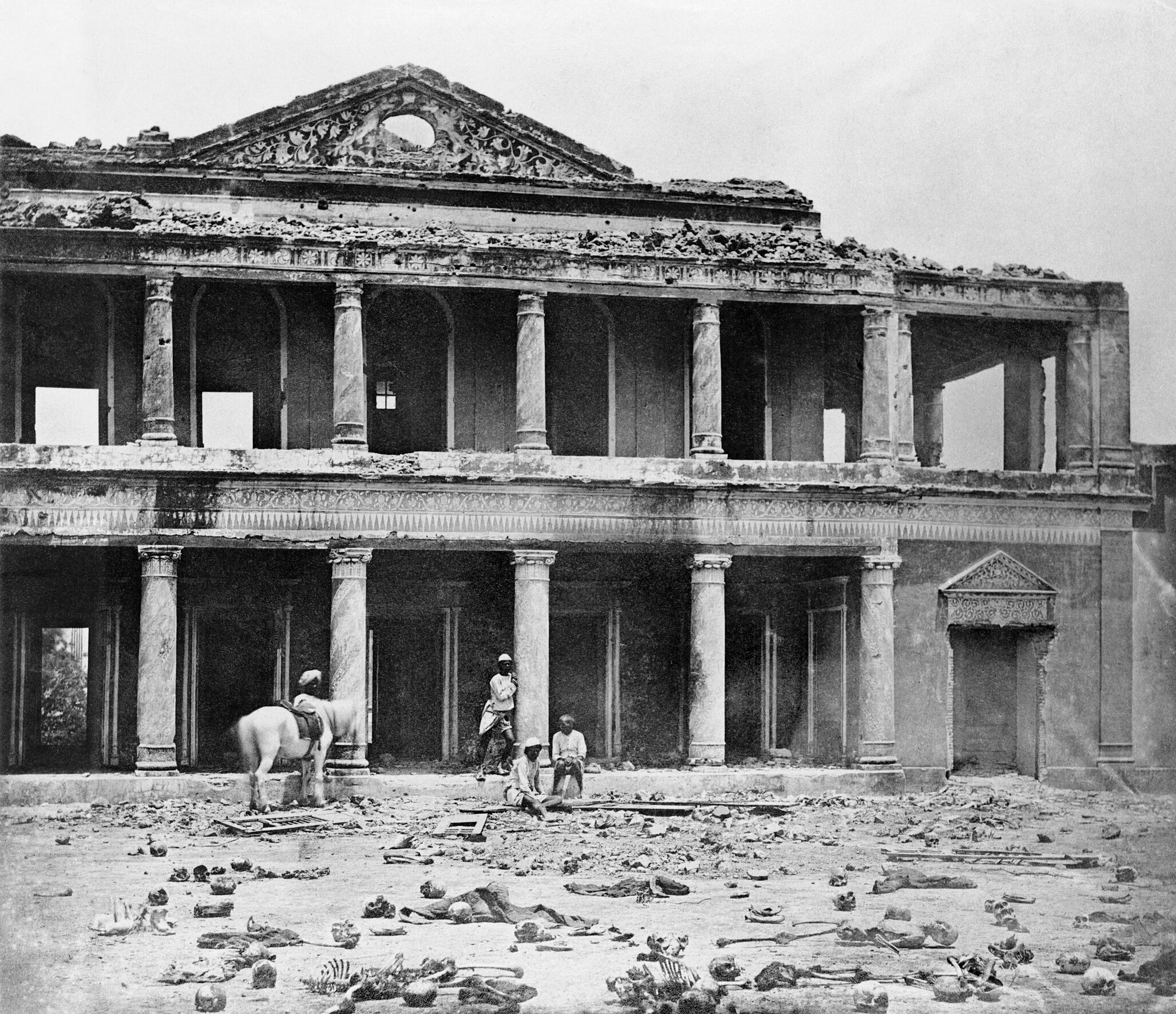
Interior of the Sikandar Bagh after the slaughter of 2,000 rebels by the 93rd Highlanders and 4th Punjab Infantry Regiment. Note skulls on ground, possibly positioned by photographer in this notorious image. Photo by Felice Beato

Denniss wrote to his wife on 30 April 1858:

Are you not pleased to see by the papers the splendid conduct of the Gallant 4th or the Denniss Ka Pultan at Delhie and Lucknow, poor old Wylde has been severely wounded in leading almost every charge at the latter place. The conduct of the regiment has been second to none since they came into these provinces. Imagine had we carried out the orders of the Board and enlisted the men for service in the Punjab only agreeable to the wishes of poor Sir Henry Lawrence what a tree we should have been up for want of soldiers to take against these Pandies.

Denniss had been at the storming of Delhi, being with General John Nicholson when the latter fell, but as an officer in the 1st European Bengal Fusiliers, of which regiment he later became Lt. Col. Sir Henry Lawrence, under whose orders Denniss had raised the regiment, had died from shell wounds on 4 July 1857 during the siege of Lucknow. Clearly his wishes for the recruitment criteria of the regiment differed from those actually used by Denniss. The word Pandy was widely used by the British as a synonym for an Indian Mutineer, after Mangal Pandey(executed 1857) one of the first Sepoys to rebel against a British Officer's command, now seen as a freedom-fighter by modern Indian historians.

== Punjab Irregular Force ==
In 1851 the 5 original Punjab Infantry regiments of the Transfrontier Brigade became part of the newly formed Punjab Irregular Force, (PIF) whose members were known as Piffers. The Transfrontier Brigade appellation was dropped. A 6th regiment was added the same year, being the former Sind Camel Corps formed in 1843 at Karachi by Lt. Robert FitzGerald, by order of General Charles James Napier, conqueror of Sind. In 1865 the PIF became the "Punjab Frontier Force".

== Second Afghan War ==
The 4th regiment was next in action in the Second Afghan War at the conclusion of which in 1882 its brother 3rd regiment of Punjab Infantry was disbanded, once again taking the number of regiments formerly in the Transfrontier Brigade to 5. The surviving regiments after 1882 were thus the 1st, 2nd, 4th, 5th and 6th. In 1894, it took part in a punitive expedition to Waziristan. In 1900, the Regiment was sent to China to help quell the Boxer Rebellion, and they were relieved in June 1902 by the 21st Punjab Infantry following the end of the rebellion.

== Renumbering as Rifle Regiment ==
In 1903, the 5 regiments were renumbered 55 to 59 and afforded the crack status of "Rifle Regiments". Each was named after a notable early commanding officer. The 4th took the appellation "57th Wilde's Rifles (Frontier Force)" in honour of its gallant commanding officer at the siege of Delhi.

== World War I ==
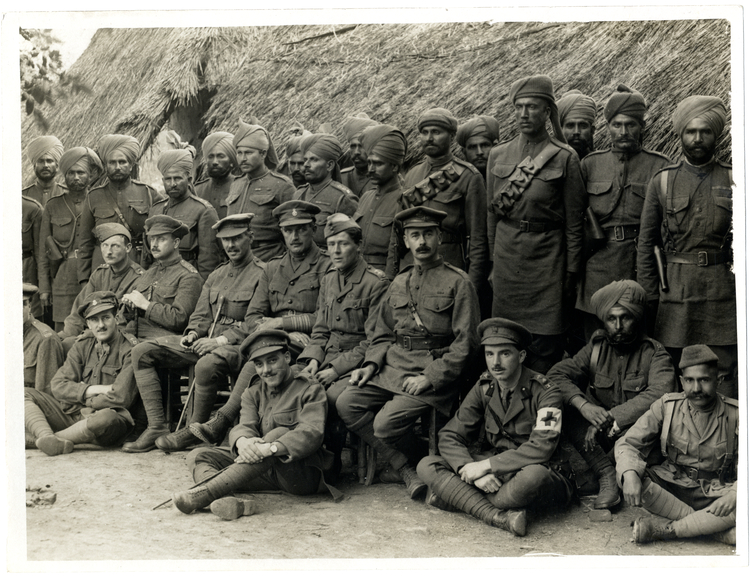
Officers of the 57th Rifles in France, 1915

During the First World War, the regiment served on the Western Front in France and Belgium, where they fought in Battles of La Bassée, Messines, Givenchy, Neuve Chapelle, and the Second Battle of Ypres.

Jemadar Mir Dast was attached to the 57th Wilde's Rifles when he performed the service for which he was awarded the Victoria Cross on 26 April 1915 at Ypres. He was injured during the battle and later taken to the Royal Pavilion military hospital in Brighton where he was presented the Victoria Cross.

From France, the regiment proceeded to German East Africa in 1916, and again distinguished itself in the long and difficult campaign. The regiment raised a second battalion in 1918, but it was disbanded soon afterwards.

== Between the Wars ==
The regiment took part in the Third Afghan War of 1919. In 1921–22, a major reorganization was undertaken in the British Indian Army leading to the formation of large infantry groups of four to six battalions. The 57th Wilde's Rifles (Frontier Force) was grouped with the 55th Coke's Rifles, 58th Vaughan's Rifles, 59th Royal Scinde Rifles, and the two battalions of 56th Punjabi Rifles (Frontier Force) to form the 13th Frontier Force Rifles. The 57th Wilde's Rifles became the 4th Battalion of the new regiment.

== World War II ==
During the Second World War, the battalion took part in the British invasion of Iraq in May 1941. It then participated in the Syria-Lebanon Campaign against the Vichy French and fought in the Battle of Deir ez-Zor on 3 July 1941. In 1942, the battalion arrived in North Africa, where it fought in the Battle of Gazala.

== Transfer to Pakistan Army ==
After the independence of Pakistan in 1947, the Frontier Force Rifles was allotted to the Pakistani Army. In 1948, 4 FF Rifles fought in the Kashmir War against India. In 1956, the Frontier Force Rifles and the Pathan Regiment were merged with the Frontier Force Regiment, and 4 FF Rifles was redesignated as '9th Battalion (Wilde's) The Frontier Force Regiment' or 9 FF. During the Indo-Pakistan War of 1965, the battalion again distinguished itself in the Battle of Chawinda. The Frontier Force Regiment still maintains the lineage and battle honours of its predecessor regiments in the British Army, and retains the old PIF regimental badge of a stringed bugle, but with the addition of an Arabic Islamic character signifying "Here I Am", the standard response to the call of Allah. They still refer to themselves proudly as "Piffers" and are headquartered at Abbottabad, a city named after General James Abbott (1807–1896).

== Victoria Cross ==
Lieutenant Henry William Pitcher 4th Punjab Infantry was awarded the Victoria Cross on 30 October 1863, in North-West India, Lieutenant Pitcher led a party to recapture the Crag Picquet after its garrison had been driven in by the enemy and sixty of them killed. He led the party up the narrow path to the last rock until he was knocked down and stunned by a large stone thrown from above. On 16 November, the lieutenant displayed great courage in leading a party to the Crag Picquet when it had again fallen into enemy hands. He led the first charge, but was wounded in the action.

== List of Commandants ==
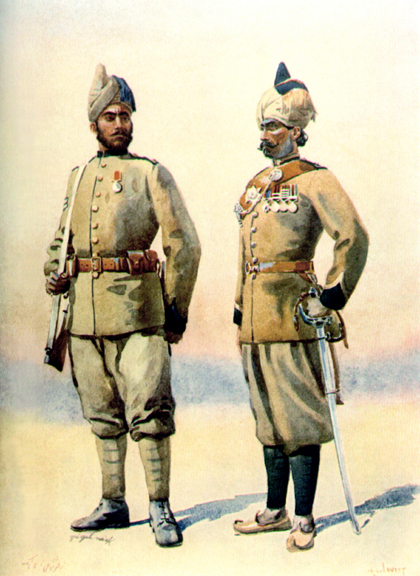
Naik, 57th Wilde's Rifles (left) and Subedar, 53rd Sikhs. Watercolour by Major AC Lovett, 1910.

Capt. O. Marshall 18/5/1849-19/3/50
Capt. G.G. Denniss 20/3/50-31/3/51
Capt. G.W.G. Bristow 1/4/51-21/10/52
Capt. T.P. Walsh 22/10/52-20/2/53
Lt. A.T. Wilde 21/2/53-10/3/62
Maj. J. Cockburne Hood 17/4/62-2/1/73
Maj. F.T. Bainbridge 3/1/73-4/10/76
Lt.Col. H.T. Close 5/10/76-31/12/82
Lt.Col. A.J.D. Hawes 1/1/83-31/3/91
Lt.Col. A. McCrae Bruce 1/4/91-4/1/94
Lt.Col O.C. Radford 5/1/94-6/2/1903
Lt.Col. L.E. Cooper 7/2/1903-12/11/05
Lt.Col. G.B. Hodson 13/11/05-9/5/12
Lt.Col. T.E. Scott 10/5/12-7/3/14
Lt.Col. F.W.B. Gray 8/3/14-3/3/16
Lt.Col. T.J. Willans 4/3/16-21/10/21
Lt.Col. G.L. Pepys 22/10/21-20/4/26
Lt.Col. E.D. Galbraith 21/4/26-31/1/30
Lt.Col. C.M.S. Manners 1/2/30-

== See also ==
- The Frontier Force Regiment
- 13th Frontier Force Rifles
- Punjab Irregular Force
