= Punjab Irregular Force =

Law enforcement force of British India

The Punjab Irregular Force (PIF) was created in 1851 to protect the NW frontier of British India. It was termed "Irregular" because it was outside the control of the Regular British East India Company Presidency armies of the three Presidencies of Bengal, Bombay or Madras, but was under the control of the British chief magistrate of Punjab, known as the President of the Board of Administration from 1849, then as the Chief Commissioner from 1853. Its soldiers were not subject to parade ground drill and showed unconcern towards routine orders given to regiments of the line. They practiced swift tactical movements in small groups, showing special elan and flair. It comprised the various regiments raised earlier for the same purpose on the orders of General Charles James Napier and Col. Sir Henry Montgomery Lawrence between 1843 and 1849 of the former Frontier Brigade established in 1846 and Transfrontier Brigade established in 1849. In 1865, the PIF was redesignated Punjab Frontier Force and in 1903 became the Frontier Force. In 1922 it was split into 2 separate units: the 12th Frontier Force Regiment and the 13th Frontier Force Rifles. In 1947, both were ceded to the new state of Pakistan, which in 1957 amalgamated them, together with a 3rd unit, the Pathan Regiment which Pakistan had earlier created from elements of both, to form the Frontier Force Regiment. Within the latter regiment, the first 15 of its 52 battalions can trace their origins back to original British Army regiments, and the regiment still maintains the lineage of its predecessor British regiments. Members of the PIF traditionally referred to themselves with pride as "Piffers", a tradition very much maintained within the Pakistan Army.

== Frontier Brigade ==
This was established in 1846 by Sir Henry Lawrence, on the British victory in the First Anglo-Sikh War. It comprised 4 regiments largely composed of native Sikh troops, although other native groupings were also included, each religious or tribal grouping forming a separate company. These were therefore designated 1st - 4th Sikh Infantry Regiments. In 1847 they were redesignated 1st - 4th Sikh Local Infantry Regiments. To the Frontier Brigade was later added the Corps of Guides which had been raised in 1846 at Peshawar by Lt Harry Burnett Lumsden, by order of Sir Henry Lawrence, and which was largely inspirational for the creation of the 2 Brigades. The Guides were long considered the ultimate "crack" unit of the PIF, and Lumsden had pioneered the use of Khaki in their uniform. In 1903, the regiments were renumbered 51st - 54th Sikh Regiments (Frontier Force). In 1922, the units within the former Frontier Brigade became the main constituents of the 12th Frontier Force Regiment

=== Regiments of the Frontier Brigade ===
- 1st Sikh Infantry Regiment
- 2nd Sikh Infantry Regiment ("Hill Corps")
- 3rd Sikh Infantry Regiment
- 4th Sikh Infantry Regiment

== Transfrontier Brigade ==
This was established in 1849 following the British victory in the Second Anglo-Sikh War and the British annexation of Punjab on 2 April 1849, also by Sir Henry Lawrence, having achieved success with his earlier Brigade. It comprised originally 5 regiments of native infantry, designated 1st - 5th Punjab Infantry Regiments and 5 of native cavalry. To the Transfrontier Brigade in 1853 was added a 6th infantry regiment, that of the Scind Camel Corps raised in 1843 at Karachi by Lt. Robert FitzGerald by order of General Charles James Napier following the latter's conquest of Scind. It was redesignated as the 6th Regiment, and thus effectively became the most senior, by age, of all the units within the PIF. In 1922 the units of the former Transfrontier Brigade became the main constituents of the 13th Frontier Force Rifles.

=== Regiments of the Transfrontier Brigade ===
(Infantry)

- 1st Punjab Infantry Regiment
- 2nd Punjab Infantry Regiment
- 3rd Punjab Infantry Regiment (disbanded in 1882)
- 4th Punjab Infantry Regiment
- 5th Punjab Infantry Regiment
- 6th Punjab Infantry Regiment

== See also ==
- North-West Frontier (military history)
- PIFFER Units (of Pakistan Army)
