= Corps of Guides (India) =

Regiment of the British Indian Army, in service from 1846 to 1922

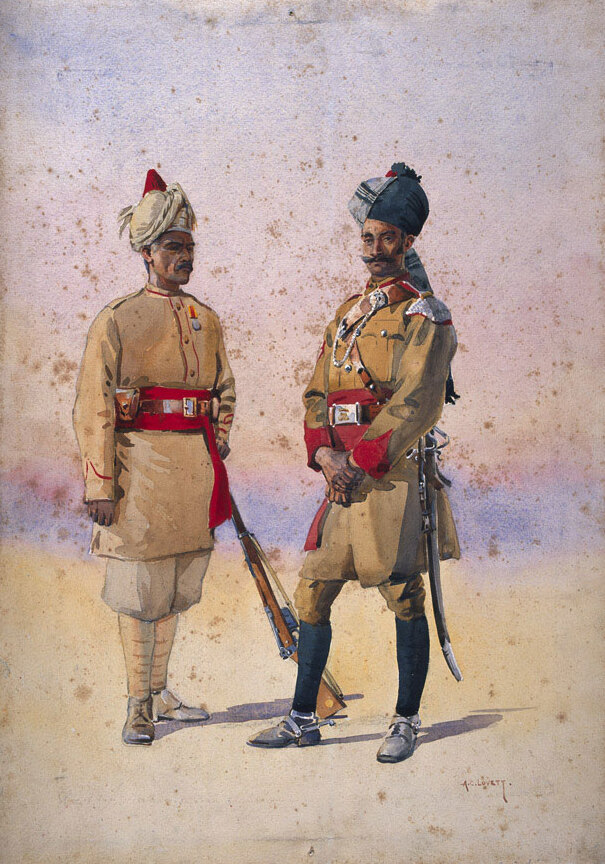
- c. 1908 illustration of two regimental soldiers
- Active: 1846–1922
- Country: Indian Empire
- Branch: Bengal Army (till 1895); British Indian Army
- Type: Joint Infantry-Cavalry
- Part of: Bengal Army (to 1895); Punjab Command
- Uniform: Drab; faced, 1859 drab, 1870 piped red, 1882 faced red, 1905 red velvet (officers) red cloth (soldiers), 1908 scarlet
- Engagements: Punjab; Mooltan; Goojerat; Delhi; ALI MASJID; 1879 KABUL; 1878–80 AFGHANISTAN; Chitral; PUNJAB FRONTIER; MALAKAND

The Corps of Guides was a regiment of the British Indian Army made up of British and Indian officers, plus Indian cavalry sowars and infantry sepoys, primarily intended for service on the North West Frontier.

As originally raised in 1846, the Corps of Guides consisted of both infantry and cavalry. It evolved through the 20th century to become the Guides Cavalry and Guides Infantry. The Guides were transferred to Pakistan at Independence and became part of the new Pakistan Army. Since 1947 all ranks, including officers, are recruited solely from Pakistan.

The modern regiment exists as 2nd Battalion (The Guides) of the Frontier Force Regiment of the Pakistan Army.

== History ==
Corps of Guides Infantry, 1897.

The brainchild of Sir Henry Lawrence, the Corps had Lt. Harry Lumsden as its commandant and W.S.R. Hodson (the Hodson of Hodson's Horse) as second-in-command. On 6 February 1847 Lumsden wrote to his father "I have just been nominated to raise the corps of Guides. It will be the finest appointment in the country". A few months later, on 16 September 1847 Hodson wrote to his brother "…of my good fortune... I am to be the Second-in-Command with the Corps of Guides".

The Corps had modest beginnings. When it was raised at Kalu Khan, on the Yusufzai Plain, in the Peshawar Valley region by Lt. Lumsden in December 1846, it comprised just one troop of cavalry and two companies of infantry. The first action was at Mughdara, in the Panitar Hills. Within two years, the small force of Guides had established a name for itself, under Lumsden, its founder, and Hodson. When the Second Sikh War broke out in 1848, the unit was given authorisation for a three-fold increase in size, to six companies of infantry and three troops of cavalry. The Guides maintained the 'cavalry and infantry combined in the same regiment' organisation for many years, and even when split into two separate components, the name lingered in both elements.

The Corps of Guides became the garrison unit of a key post on the frontier, the new fort of (Hoti ~) Mardan. The building of the fort in 1854 was organised and supervised by Hodson who had been promoted commandant of the regiment in 1852. In 1857 the unit was called urgently to help relieve the Siege of Delhi. In just over three weeks the Guides marched nearly six hundred miles during the hottest month of the year, crossing five great rivers and fighting four small actions. The march coincided with the month of Ramadan meaning that the muslim soldiers in the force could neither eat nor drink during the hours of daylight. On arrival at Delhi, the force of 600 Guides were almost immediately called upon to join the defence of the city. Men who had just completed a march of some 580 miles were thrown into a battle of such intensity that no fewer than 350 of the 600 became casualties within an hour of their arrival in Delhi.

The Corps of Guides was part of the Frontier Force brigade and developed a reputation of being an elite unit. Typically, the Guides were often used in small detachments, usually supported by other Frontier Force troops.

The designations of the Corps of Guides changed over time as follows:

- The Corps of Guides (1846)
- The Corps of Guides, Punjab Irregular Force (1857)
- Corps of Guides, Punjab Frontier Force (1865)
- Queen's Own Corps of Guides, Punjab Frontier Force (1876)
- Queen's Own Corps of Guides (1901)
- Queen's Own Corps of Guides (Lumsden's) (1904)
- Queen Victoria's Own Corps of Guides (Frontier Force) (Lumsden's) (1911).

In 1911 the cavalry and infantry components were designated as such. The cavalry then became, successively:-

- Queen Victoria's Own Corps of Guides (Frontier Force) (Lumsden's) Cavalry (1911)
- 10th Queen Victoria's Own Corps Of Guides Cavalry (Frontier Force) (1922)
- The Guides Cavalry (10th Queen Victoria's Own Frontier Force) (1927)

and the infantry:-

- Queen Victoria's Own Corps of Guides (Frontier Force) (Lumsden's) Infantry (1911)
- 5th Bn (QVO Corps of Guides) 12th Frontier Force Regiment (1922)

=== Post-World War II ===
In 1945, the 12th Frontier Force Regiment was renamed the Frontier Force Regiment and on independence and the partition of India it was allocated to Pakistan. The cavalry regiment was also allocated to Pakistan and was renamed the Guides Cavalry (Frontier Force). In 1957, the Frontier Force Rifles and The Pathan Regiment were amalgamated with the Frontier Force Regiment to form a new Frontier Force Regiment. The Guides battalion became the 2nd battalion of the new regiment.

== Uniform ==
The Guides were the first unit in the Indian or British Armies to dress in "khaki" or drab uniforms, first introduced in 1848.

The regiment wore a scarlet facing colour on the collars and cuffs of their khaki uniforms from their establishment. Accordingly, both The 10th Guides Cavalry (FF) and the 2nd Battalion (The Guides) of the Frontier Force Regiment of the Pakistan Army still wear red piping on the collars of their modern dress uniforms.

== Literature ==
- The Guides are the subject of George John Younghusband's book, The story of the Guides, first published in March 1908.
- Rudyard Kipling's "The Ballad of East and West" is about the Guides.
- M.M. Kaye's novel The Far Pavilions is about an officer in the Guides.
- Peter Stark Lumsden and George Robert Elsmie, Lumsden of the Guides: A Sketch of the Life of Lieut.-Gen. Sir Harry Burnett Lumsden, KCSI, CB., with Selections from His Correspondence and Occasional Papers (London: J. Murray, 1900; facsimile edition by BiblioLife, 2010)
- Twelve years of a soldier's life in India: being extracts from the letters of the late Major W. S. R. Hodson ed. by his brother, the Rev. George H. Hodson (London 1859) contains a number of references to its formation and accounts of the early years of the regiment under Lumsden and Hodson.
- Memoirs of General Sir Henry Dermot Daly, G.C.B., C.I.E. (1905) by Maj. H. Daly.
- The Leopard and the Cliff, a fictitious account of an incident in the North-West Frontier during the Third Anglo-Afghan War, was written by Wallace Breem, a Commissioned Officer in the Corps of Guides. Although not principally about the Guides it is contemporaneous and makes several references to them.

== Founding figures ==
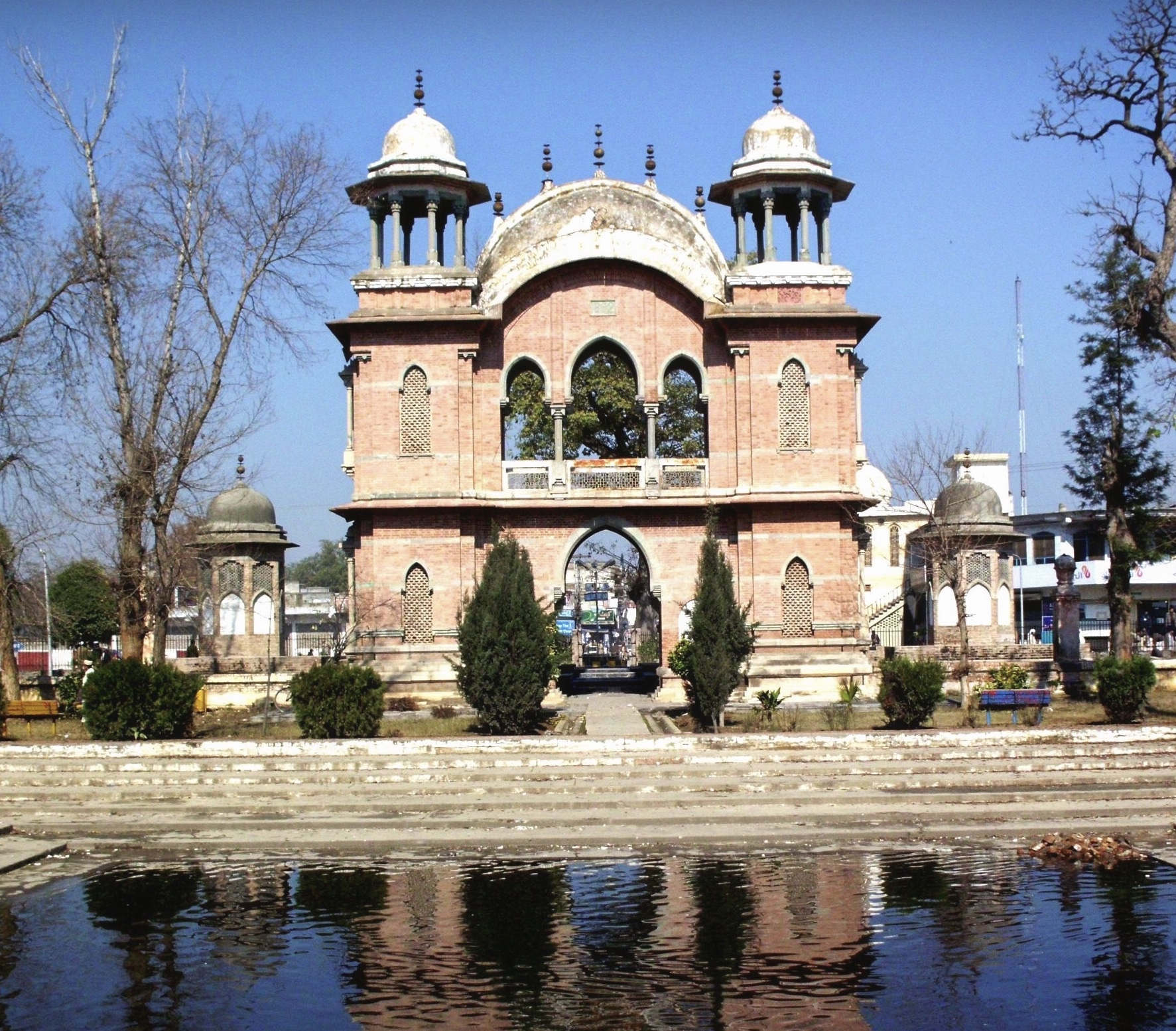
Queen's Own Corps of Guides Memorial, Cavagnari's Arch in Mardan

- Sir Harry Lumsden
- W.S.R. Hodson (the Hodson of Hodson's Horse)
- G.N. Hardinge
- Dr. R. Lyell (MO)
- Frederick Battye
- Wigram Battye
- Sir Henry Daly, GCB, CIE
- Walter Hamilton, VC
- Surgeon A.H. Kelly (MO)
- Arthur Hammond, VC

== See also ==
- Guides Cavalry
- Guides Infantry
