= Pathan Regiment =

Former infantry regiment of the Pakistan Army

The Pathan Regiment was an infantry regiment of the Pakistan Army now merged into Frontier Force Regiment. It was raised after the independence of Pakistan on November 1, 1948 from the strength of 12th Frontier Force Regiment and 13th Frontier Force Rifles. The establishment of this regiment was intended to appease the locals of the Khyber Pakhtunkhwa, who were partially divided at the time of independence in 1947. The regimental depot was stationed at Dera Ismail Khan and later relocated to Kohat in 1949. In 1956, this regiment was merged with others to form the Frontier Force Regiment with its regimental depot at Abbottabad. The battalions which were assigned to Pathan regiment were:

- 1 Pathan Regiment: 14/12 Frontier Force Regiment
- 2 Pathan Regiment: 14/13 Frontier Force Rifles
- 3 Pathan Regiment: 15/13 Frontier Force Rifles

== See also ==
- Frontier Force Regiment
- Piffer Units
