= Battle of Sheikh Sa'ad =

1916 battle of WWI in Mesopotamia

- Part of the Mesopotamian campaign of World War I
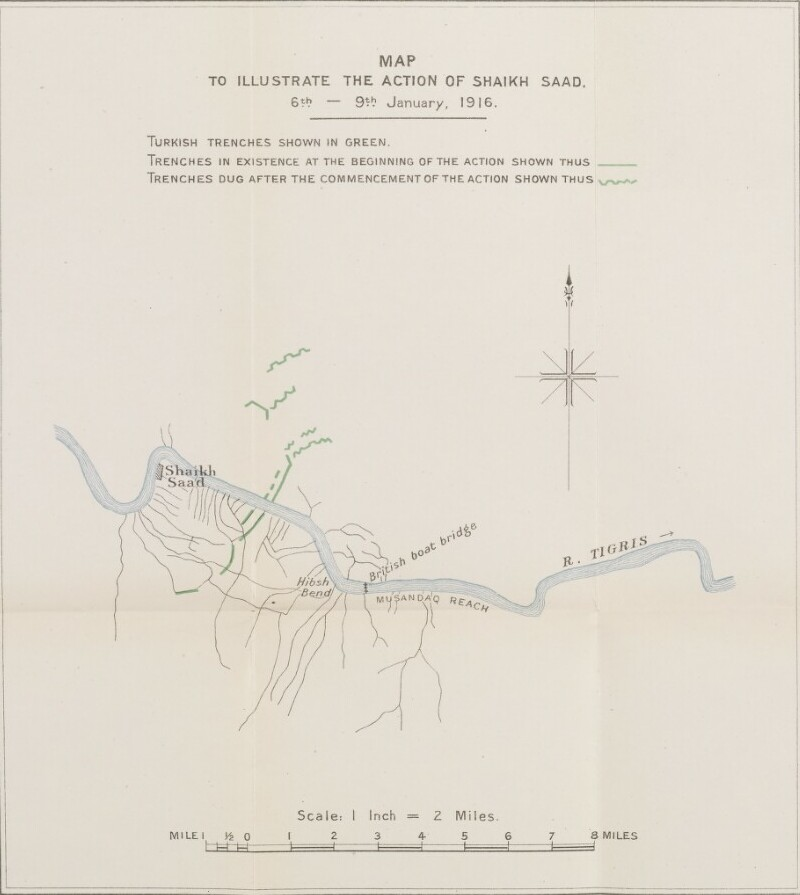
- A 1924 British map showing action at the battle.
| Date | 6–8 January 1916 |
| Location | Ottoman Iraq |
| Result | British-Indian victory |

Belligerents
| British Empire: India; United Kingdom | Ottoman Empire: German Empire (Military Commanders) |

Commanders and leaders
| (United Kingdom of Great Britain and Ireland) Fenton Aylmer (British Raj) George Younghusband (British Raj) George Kemball | (German Empire) Colmar Freiherr von der Goltz (Ottoman Empire) Halil Pasha |

Strength
| 13,330 men total: 9,900 infantry; 1,340 cavalry; 42 artillery pieces | 3,400 infantry 20 artillery pieces 1 brigade of cavalry |

Casualties and losses
| 4,262 casualties: 1,962 dead 2,300 wounded | 1,200 casualties: Unknown dead, 512 prisoners 2 artillery pieces captured |

The Battle of Sheikh Sa'ad (Turkish: Sağ Sahil) occurred between 6–8 January 1916 during the Mesopotamian Campaign of the First World War. The battle took place along the banks of the Tigris River between the Anglo-Indian Tigris Corps and elements of the Sixth Army in Ottoman Iraq. The engagement was the first in a series of assaults by the Tigris Corps to try to break through the Ottoman lines to relieve the besieged garrison at Kut.

== Background ==
With the entry of Ottoman Empire to the First World War on 31 October 1914, Indian Expeditionary Force D was ordered to secure the Shatt-al-Arab and Basra in order to safeguard the flow of oil from British-owned oilfields in Persia. Following the capture, Force "D"'s mission in Mesopotamia expanded gradually as local commanders saw a chance for victories which would burnish the British Empire's prestige in the Muslim world. At the battles of Qurna, Nasiriyeh, and Es Sinn, Force "D" defeated elements of the Ottoman Sixth Army. After the Battle of Es Sinn, the Anglo-Indian force controlled the Tigris and Euphrates rivers through much of what is now southern Iraq. Sensing that Baghdad was within their gasp, the commander of Force "D", supported by the Commander in Chief, India, in Simla, argued for permission to launch a final offensive to capture it. The situation looked promising. The nearest Ottoman reserves, according to British intelligence, were 400 miles distant in the Caucasus or 250 miles away at Aleppo in Syria. All that blocked the way to Baghdad were two demoralized, defeated divisions.

In London, the India Office was staunchly opposed to any further advance. At this point in the war, the Indian Office, and not the War Office, controlled the operations in Mesopotamia. Secretary of State for India, Austen Chamberlain objected to the proposed advance because of his concern that even if Baghdad could be captured, it would only be lost again because no other troops were available to reinforce Force "D". Eventually, the question of a further advance was taken up by Asquith's War Cabinet. The decision to advance was given.

During the second half of 1915, Force "D" had only one division, the 6th (Poona) Division under Major-General Charles V.F. Townshend, available for offensive operations. Although tactically successful at the Battle of Ctesiphon against the Ottoman Sixth Army, but this proved to be a Pyrrhic victory. The Poona Division retreated to Kut. The Ottoman Sixth Army, now reinforced, followed and laid siege to the Anglo-Indian force at Kut-al-Amarrah.

== Situation at the end of December 1915 ==
=== Situation in Kut ===
The key to whether the Kut garrison would be able to hold out was food. After early attempts to storm the town failed, the Ottoman forces investing Kut opted to starve the defenders into submission. Townshend had ordered some of his forces to break out and regroup downriver where the remnants of I.E.F. "D" were beginning to gather. However, even by decreasing the number of mouths to feed, the food problem was more complex than simply the amount available. As the siege began to drag on, Townshend sent word to Nixon that his food supply would only last until 15 January 1916.

The Kut garrison was made up of the 6th (Poona) Division. Unlike a typical British division, or even an Ottoman one, Indian Army divisions had a complex make up. Battalions would be made up of companies from the various Indian ethnic and religious groups. Each group had its own dietary requirements. Hindus, for example, would never touch meat from a cow or even allow their food to be cooked in pots which had cooked cow meat. Sikhs, while allowing meat to be eaten, could not eat any animals slaughtered in accordance with a ritual, such as halal. Muslim troops required food prepared in accordance with halal. Finally, there were the British troops, whose diet was decided by Whitehall. Along the North-West Frontier, where Indian Army units traditionally were assigned, the mixed dietary needs were manageable. But in Mesopotamia, at the end of a long and poorly developed supply line, the problem was significantly more difficult. At the start of the siege, in December 1915, Townshend reported he had enough food to feed the sepoys of his division for 54 days.

Although Townshend declared that his intent to engage in an active defense of Kut, the reality was completely different. Instead of launching any raids or sorties, Townshend dug his troops in around the town of Kut, and across the river at the village the soldier's nicknamed "Woolpress", and awaited rescue. At the first sign that the pontoon bridge, the primary link between Kut and Woolpress, was threatened by the Ottoman siege lines, Townshend ordered it destroyed. This left Townshend with only a few small launches and the gunboat Sumana to ferry men and supplies across the river.

=== Collecting the relief force ===
Downriver from Kut, at Ali Gharbi, Lieutenant-General Fenton Aylmer was collecting forces to relieve the Kut garrison. Initially, the only force available in theatre which were not already in Kut was the 6th Indian Cavalry Brigade and the 35th and 28th Indian Brigades. They would soon be joined by the first elements of the 7th (Meerut) Division. With pressure from both Townshend in Kut and Nixon in Basra, Aylmer succumbed to their demands and began his advance upriver as soon as his he had collected three full brigades of infantry. Setting out on 4 January 1916, Aylmer would be able to commit approximately 9,900 infantry, 1340 cavalry, and 42 field guns. Additionally, along the Tigris there would be four gunboats to support the advance.

Prior to arriving in theater, Meerut Division had briefly refit in Egypt after being withdrawn from France. Although prized by I.E.F. "D" as a veteran formation, the Meerut Division's experienced had come at a high price. As part of Indian Expeditionary Force A, later re-designated as the Indian Corps, the Meerut Division had arrived in France in September 1914, participating in the Battle of La Bassée, Battle of Neuve Chapelle, Battle of Aubers, and Battle of Loos. By December 1915, the division has suffered heavy casualties among the sepoys and their British officers. The Indian Army's reserve system, never fully developed before the war, was overtaxed trying to resupply the division's battalions with fresh, trained sepoys. Even more difficult was the problem of finding replacement officers to command the Indian troops.

Since the Sepoy Mutiny, British policy had been to ensure that senior officers of an Indian Army unit would always be British. Only European Britons could hold positions as company commanders, adjutants, quartermasters, and battalion commanders. However, not any British officer would be effective commanding the Indian troops. It took time to teach language and cultural skills necessary to deal with the various castes, religions, and ethnicities that made up the Indian Army.

Not only was it problematic finding qualified British officers to command the companies and battalions of the Indian Army, there was also a shortage of trained Indians to be granted a Viceroy's Commission. Viceroy Commissioned Officers occupied a unique position between the junior British officers and the senior non-commissioned officers. During its year in France, the VCO's of the Meerut had also suffered heavy casualties. Prior to the war, when most operations of the Indian Army were along the North-West Frontier, there had never been a need to quickly produce VCOs. Consequently, those who were promoted to the rank of VCO was typically a long service soldier of many years of experience. With the heavy casualties of France, the system had not yet caught up to the realities of the new type of war they were fighting. Confronted with a type of war they had never expected to be a part of, morale among the Indian troops plummeted. As an added insult, when the Meerut and Lahore Divisions were withdrawn from France, they ceased receiving combat pay, even though they were being shipped Egypt, under threat from Ottoman force, and then to Mesopotamia, to actively take part in an offensive.

Comparatively, the Indian units were even more ill-equipped for modern war than the rest of troops of Britain's empire. Indian divisions had less artillery assigned to it. At the start of the war, an Indian Division had one brigade of artillery, as opposed to the three assigned to a British European division. What artillery that an Indian division did have was typically lighter, more suited for expeditions along the North-West Frontier. Its troops were deliberately kept a generation behind in infantry weaponry. During their time in France, the Indian Corps divisions had been brought up to date with the latest weaponry, including flare guns and bombs. However, when withdrawn from France, most of this equipment was left behind in France for their replacements to use.

To manage the fighting of this ad hoc unit, Aylmer had almost no staff support. His staff for the relief force, designated as Tigris Corps, consisted of one staff officer, one wounded officer, and one brigadier who had failed to finish the Quetta Staff College. In addition to this staff, his collection of brigades would be under the command of the Major-General Sir George Younghusband, GOC of the 7th (Meerut) Division, who was without his staff. Just after the new year, Aylmer's ordered his force to move upriver from Ali Gharbi.

=== Ottoman preparations ===
Upriver waited the Ottoman Sixth Army under the command of Field Marshal Colmar Freiherr von der Goltz. Recalled from retirement to join the military mission to Germany's ally, von der Goltz had been given command of the Ottoman Sixth Army in October 1915. After two attempts to take Kut by storm failed, von der Goltz, over the objections of his senior Ottoman officers, opted to starve the defenders into submission.

By the time the relief force began its advance, von der Goltz's Sixth Army could field two corps of infantry: XIII and XVIII Corps. Because Townshend's intentions were still unknown to the Sixth Army, von der Goltz had to commit a substantial portion of his command to maintaining the siege lines. This was needed to prevent Townshend's troops from attempting a breakout in coordination with Aylmer's offensive. In January 1916, the siege was being maintained by XVIII Corps, under the command of Colonel Kazime Pasha, was composed of the 45th and 51st Infantry Divisions.

Colonel Khalil Pasha's XIII Corps, composed up of 35th and 52nd Infantry Divisions, moved down river to block any advance by the Tigris Corps. The 52nd Division had arrived in region in time to take part in the Battle of Ctesiphon and the early stages of the siege of Kut. It was a war formed division which originally served in Caucasus region before being rushed to the Mesopotamian theater. The 35th Division, on the other hand, was a pre-war division that had originally been assigned to defend the Basra and Baghdad vilayets. Along with the 38th Division, they had unsuccessfully opposed the I.E.F. "D" initial advances. After suffering heavy casualties, the survivors of the 35th and 38th Divisions had been consolidated into a single division. While this brought the 35th Division up to something close to an effective combat strength, it also brought with it the morale problems which had existed in the 38th Division. The 38th Division had been composed primarily of levies from the Arab and Kurdish populations. Neither group felt any particular attachment to the Ottoman government. Their loyalty was suspect, and discipline was always a problem. Between them, the 35th and 52nd Divisions would be able to muster approximately 9000 infantry, 20 artillery pieces, a brigade of cavalry, as well as a group of mounted Arab irregulars.

Establishing themselves as far downriver as possible, while still close enough to support and be supported by the XVIII Corps, the XIII Corps chose to fortify the position at Sheikh Sa'ad. There the 35th Division began creating a series of trench works to await the Anglo-Indian advance. The balance of the corps remained further upriver where it would be able to support both the siege operations around Kut and the defenses at Sheikh Sa'ad.

== 6–8 January 1916 ==
Unable to resist pressure any longer, Aylmer ordered Younghusband to advance upriver with the 19th, 28th, and 35th Indian Brigades on 3 January 1916. Aylmer remained behind at Ali Gharbi, awaiting further reinforcements already en route before moving to combine with Younghusband's force. At Ali Gharbi, Aylmer retained almost all of the Tigris Corps' cavalry, as well as 21st (Bareilly) Brigade, a collection of un-brigaded battalions that he would eventually form the 9th (Sirhind) Brigade, some artillery, as well as Corps support troops. Although ordered to advance, Younghusband was also instructed not to become heavily engaged until Aylmer arrived with the rest of the Tigris Corps.

Not only did Younghusband have any cavalry, but the weather made it impossible to take advantage of the few airplanes available to the Tigris Corps. The winter rains arrived along the lower Tigris, turning the terrain into a quagmire of mud. Younghusband would later write, ""Having no cavalry, or aeroplanes, or other means of reconnoitring, and the country being as flat as a billiard table, the only way of reconnoitering the Ottomans was to march on, till we bumped into them." On 5 January 1916, Younghusband's troops were informed by local Arabs that Ottoman forces had dug-in just upriver from their position. The next day, the Younghusband's force bumped into the Ottoman positions.

=== 6 January 1916 ===
The area of the Sheikh Sa'ad defenses was flat and featureless. The Ottoman positions were well camouflaged. There was no elevated ground to help provide observation posts for the advancing Tigris Corps. As Younghusband's troops advanced up both banks of the Tigris, they began to run into Ottoman emplacements around 10:30 a.m. Without waiting to concentrate his forces, or for Aylmer to arrive with the rest of the Tigris Corps, Younghusband ordered his troops on both sides of the river to attack.

The 28th Brigade, supported by the 92nd Punjabis, attacked the Ottoman positions on the right bank, while 19th and 35th Brigades attacked the Ottoman defenses on the right. Younghusband's forces had only a vague idea as to where the Ottoman positions were. Lacking any elevated ground, effective aerial reconnaissance, or sufficient cavalry, the British and Indian troops had to feel their to discover where the Ottoman positions started and ended. Trying to manage the battle on both sides of the river, Younghusband was unable to effectively manage his forces. On the right bank, Kemball's forces attempted to flank the Ottoman positions, but ended up attacking the center of defenses. Meanwhile, on the left bank Rice's brigade was ordered only to probe the Ottoman lines.

The defenses were held by the Ottoman 35th Division who were heavily outnumbered by Younghusband's forces. Although outnumbered almost 4 to 1, the Ottoman forces were stubbornly defended the Sheikh Sa'ad defenses. On the left bank, the failure to push through a concerted attack allowed them to hold their position without revealing the extent of the defenses. On the right bank, the Ottoman troops began to give way in the afternoon, allowing Kemball's brigade to occupy the forward trenches of the defenses.

At around 4 p.m., Younghusband called off the attack and ordered his units to regroup. Ironically, this forced Kemball to withdraw his troops from the Ottoman positions along the right bank, allowing the Ottoman forces to reoccupy them that night. In all, Younghusband's command suffered 600 dead that day.

As Younghusband's troops started to regroup, reinforcements for both sides began to arrive. Aylmer arrived with the 9th Infantry Brigade, 6th Cavalry Brigade, and the support troops. The Tigris Corps had an edge in number of artillery available, but most were either older types or lighter pieces. Furthermore, effective spotting for the artillery was still difficult as the Tigris Corps still had only an incomplete picture of exactly where the Ottoman defenses were. The balance of the 35th Division and 52nd Division were rushed up to the Sheikh Sa'ad defenses. A brigade of Ottoman cavalry was also moved up to support the defenses on the left bank. In all, both sides could field about 9,000 men.

=== 7 January 1916 ===
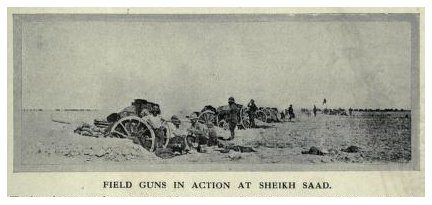
British field artillery in action supporting the Anglo-Indian attack on the Ottoman positions during the Battle of Sheikh Sa'ad.

With Aylmer present, the British began to concentrate their forces for a follow-up attack on 7 January 1916. On the left bank, Younghusband would command 19th, 21st, and 35th Brigades. On the right bank, Kemball would command the 28th Brigade, reinforced by the 62nd Punjabis and 92nd Punjabis from the 19th Brigade. Defending the right bank was 35th Division while the 52nd Division occupied the position on the left bank.

On 6 January, Younghusband had loosely controlled the action, allowing his brigade commanders wider latitude. On 7 January, with Aylmer now in command, he instituted tighter controls over the brigade commanders, trying to orchestrate a coordinated attack. Aylmer's plan was to hold the Ottoman forces in place on the left bank with demonstration by the 35th Brigade. As this happened, the 19th and 21st Brigades would attack the left flank of the defenses. This would mean marching the 19th and 21st Brigades more than five miles to get to the jumping off point for the attack. On the right bank, Kemball's troops would try to retake the ground that they had given up the previous afternoon in order to bring enfilading fire against the left bank positions.

As day broke, the Tigris Corps found itself advancing through a heavy fog. On left bank, Younghusband's brigades began their advance in the mid-morning. Approximately two hours into the advance, the brigades paused in their movements to break for lunch. At midday, the fog began to clear and turn into an unseasonably hot day. As the British and Indian battalions were cooking their food, the Ottoman forces launched a spoiling attack. Even though it was driven back, the left bank Tigris Corps' attack on the left bank was further delayed. Eventually, Younghusband's troops reached their positions and launched their attack. However, the objectives of their attack turned out to be the center of the left bank defenses. Through the rest of the afternoon, Younghusband's brigades failed to make much headway against the Ottoman defenders. With no cover on the ground, the assault battalions came under fire at long range from rifle, machinegun, and artillery. Few units made it closer than 300 yards before having to dig in for some cover.

On the right bank, Kemball's forces had a better idea as to where the Ottoman positions were. The morning fog, which would have helped to cover their advance was allowed to dissipate because Kemball was under orders to wait until the attack started on the left bank. Finally, at around 2:30 p.m., Kemball was given permission to launch his attack. Unlike the attacks on the left bank, the reinforced 28th Brigade quickly captured the outposts of the Ottoman positions. Following up on this initial success, the 92nd Punjabis broke through the main line of the Ottoman defenses, followed by 2nd Leicestershire Regiment and 51st Sikhs.

By the end of the day, the right bank defenses were completely in the hands of the Kemball's brigade. With their flank now open to enfilading fire from machine-guns and artillery on the right bank, the left bank defenses were now untenable. Through the night and the raid of the next day, the XIII Corps began withdrawing. It would retreat seven miles to positions being prepared at the Wadi, a tributary of the Tigris. On 9 January, the Tigris Corps would occupy the left bank positions.

== Aftermath ==
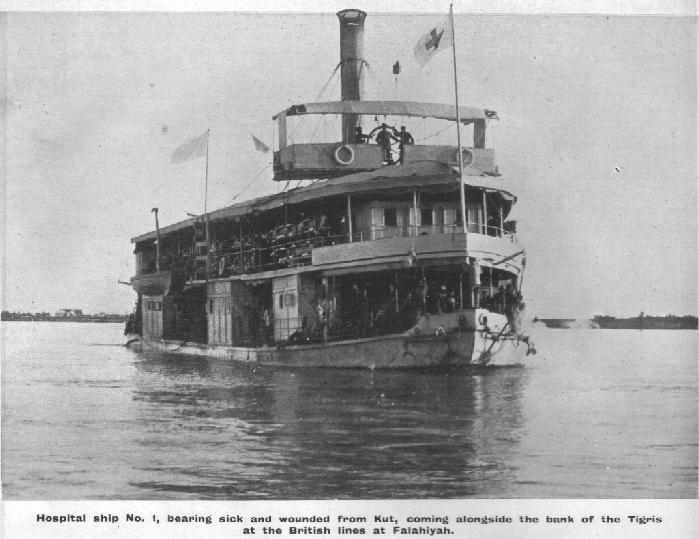
Hospital Ship No. 1, one of the few available, on the Tigris River in 1916 carrying British and Indian wounded back to the British clearing hospital at Falahiyah during the relief force's attempt to rescue the Kut garrison.

The Tigris Corps had taken the position, but the cost of breaking through the Ottoman defenses had heavy casualties. Aylmer's command suffered 1,962 dead and 2,300 wounded out of 13,300 men. The medical preparations for the relief force had been almost an afterthought. Most of the medical units attached to the Meerut Division were still working their way upriver or awaiting transport in Basra.

At the time of the battle, the Tigris Corps had facilities to treat 250 wounded soldiers. By the end of 7 January 1916, the field ambulances were trying to deal with almost ten times that may. Some of the wounded had to wait as much as ten days before they were finally cleared through the field ambulances before being sent to the hospitals established downriver at Basra.

Although the Aylmer's force had captured Sheikh Sa'ad, it had cost him nearly 4,400 dead and wounded to do so. General Nixon, in his dispatch to the War Office, would estimate that the Ottoman forces had suffered 4,400 casualties, but this number is suspect. Kemball's force on the right bank was successful in breaking into the Ottoman defenses, the same did not happen on the left bank. Furthermore, there were reports that the artillery fire, due to the lack of good observation points and the Ottoman camouflage efforts, was ineffective. When it became clear that their right bank defenses had fallen, the Ottomans displaced in good order, taking with them all their artillery. The Ottomans retreated seven miles upriver and occupied their next line of defenses being readied at an area known as "the Wadi".

Despite the casualties, Aylmer could not afford to spend much time waiting for the arrival of the second division of reinforcements still working its way upriver to the front. Every advance he made put him further from his supply base at Basra, and closer to the Ottoman logistical hub at Baghdad. Although considered a British victory (albeit a costly one), the Ottoman forces had achieved their goal in delaying the Tigris Corps. They had bloodied Aylmer's forces, using up time which the Kut garrison believed it did not have and reinforcements which were hard for the British and Indian governments to replace.

== Orders of battle ==
=== Anglo-Indian Tigris Corps ===
Younghusband's Force, 6 January 1916

| 19th (Dehra Dun) Brigade (Colonel William A. B. Dennys) | 28th Indian Brigade (Major-General George Vero Kemball) | 35th Indian Brigade (Brigadier-General Gerald B. H. Rice) | Artillery |
|---|---|---|---|
| 1st Battalion, Seaforth Highlanders | 2nd Battalion, Leicestershire Regiment | 1/5th Battalion, Buffs (East Kent Regiment) | 19th Battery, R.F.A. (9th Brigade R.F.A.) |
| 28th Punjabis | 51st Sikhs (Frontier Force) | 37th Dogras | 20th Battery, R.F.A. (9th Brigade R.F.A.) |
| 92nd Punjabis | 53rd Sikhs (Frontier Force) | 97th Deccan Infantry | 28th Battery, R.F.A. (9th Brigade R.F.A.) |
| 125th Napier's Rifles | 56th Punjabi Rifles (Frontier Force) | 102nd King Edward's Own Grenadiers | 1/1st Sussex Battery, R.F.A. (15-pounders) |
| | 62nd Punjabis (temporarily attached) | | 72nd Heavy Battery, R.G.A. |
| | | | 77th Heavy Battery, R.G.A. |
| | | | 104th Heavy Battery (1 section), R.G.A. |

Reinforcements, 7 January 1916

| 21st (Bareilly) Brigade | 9th (Sirhind) Brigade | 6th Indian Cavalry Brigade | Corps Troops |
|---|---|---|---|
| 2nd Battalion, Black Watch | 1/4th Battalion, Hampshire Regiment (less 1 company) | 14th King's Hussars | 1st Provisional Battery |
| 6th Jat Light Infantry | 107th Pioneers | 4th Cavalry | No. 18 Cavalry Field Ambulance |
| 41st Dogras | 67th Punjabis (less 1 company) | 7th Hariana Lancers (less 1 squadron) | No. 1 Field Ambulance (2 sections) |
| 9th Bhopal Infantry | | 33rd Queen Victoria's Own Light Cavalry | No. 5 Field Ambulance (2 sections) |
| | | S Battery, RHA | No. 6 Field Ambulance (2 sections) |
| | | | 61st Howitzer Battery |

=== Ottoman forces ===
XIII Corps (Colonel Nureddin) 35th Division

- 103rd Infantry Regiment (3 battalions)
- 104th Infantry Regiment (3 battalions)
- 105th Infantry Regiment (2 battalions)

52nd Division (arriving during the evening of 6 January 1916)

- 9 infantry battalions

Ottoman Cavalry Brigade (arriving during evening of 6 January 1916) Camel Corps Regiment
Arab Irregulars
Artillery (20 guns)

== Sources ==
- Barker, A.J. (2009). The First Iraq War, 1914-1918: Britain's Mesopotamian Campaign. New York: Enigma Books. ISBN 978-1-929631-86-5.
- Burg, Peter; Purcell, L. Edward (1998). Almanac of World War I. University of Kentucky Press. ISBN 0-8131-2072-1.
- Candler, Edmund (1919). The Long Road To Baghdad. Cassell and Company.
- Cato, Conrad (1917). The Navy in Mesopotamia 1914 to 1917. Constable and Company.
- Dane, Edmund (1919). British Campaigns In The Nearer East, 1914–1918. Hodder and Stoughton.
- Davis, Paul K. (1994). Ends and Means: The British Mesopotamian Campaign and Commission. Farleigh Dickinson University Press. ISBN 0-8386-3530-X.
- Erickson, Edward J. (2001). Ordered to Die: A History of the Ottoman Army in the First World War. Greenwood Publishing Group. ISBN 978-0-313-31516-9.
- Keegan, John (2000). The First World War. Vintage Canada and colophon.
- Lee, J. Fitzgerald (1927). The "D" Force (Mesopotamia) In The Great War. Wm. May & Co., Ltd.
- Mason, Philip (1974). A Matter of Honour: An Account of the Indian Army, Its Officers & Men. Ebenezar Bayliss and Son Limited. ISBN 0-03-012911-7.
- Moberly, Brig.-Gen. F.J. (1923). History of the Great War Based on Official Documents: The Campaign in Mesopotamia 1914–1918. His Majesty's Stationery Office. ISBN 0-89839-268-3.
- Sandes, Major E.W.C. (1920). In Kut and Captivity With the Sixth Indian Division. John Murray.
- Townshend, Major General Charles Vere Ferrers (1920). My Campaign. James A. McCann Company.
- Wilson, Lieutenant-Colonel Sir Arthur T. (1969). Loyalties: Mesopotamia 1914–1917. Greenwood Press, Publishers.
