= Battle of Sheikh Othman =

- Part of South Arabia during World War I
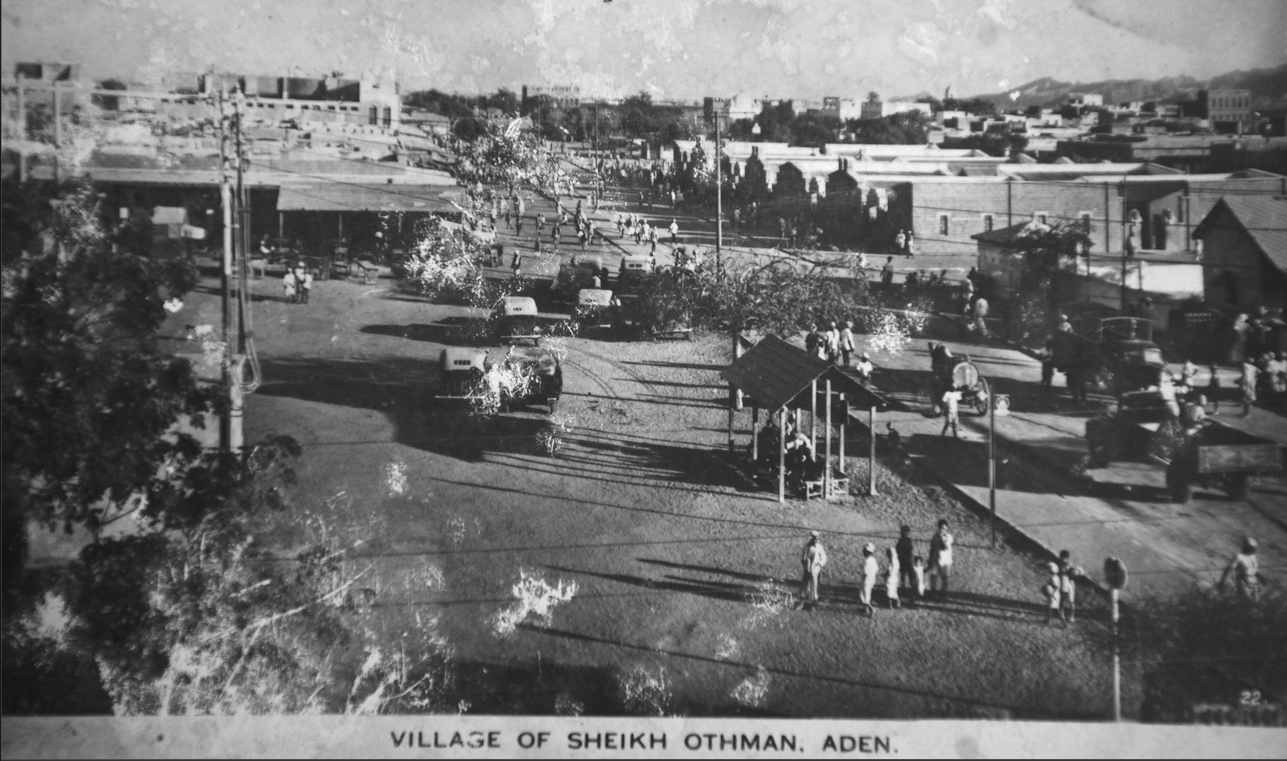
- Village of Sheikh Othman, Aden
Date	21 July 1915
Location	Sheikh Othman, Aden, South Arabia (now Yemen) 12.8768°N 44.9931°E
Result	British victory
Territorial changes	British recapture of Sheikh Othman

Belligerents
(United Kingdom) British Empire	Ottoman Empire

Commanders and leaders
(United Kingdom) George Younghusband	Unknown

Strength
3,500	2,150

Casualties and losses
8 killed 26 wounded	50–60 killed Several hundred prisoners
- Location within Yemen

The Battle of Sheikh Othman (Note: Turkish: Şeyh Osman Muharebesi; Arabic: معركة الشيخ عثمان) (21 July 1915) was a military engagement between forces of the British Empire and the Ottoman Empire during the South Arabian campaign of the First World War.

== Background ==
In mid-1915 the Turks stirred up trouble amongst tribes in the Aden hinterland, threatening the Sultan of Lahej. A British column was despatched to Lahej but numerous difficulties, not the least being the deadly summer heat and the breakdown of the water and ammunition transport arrangements due to the desertion of local drivers, led to a disorganised British retreat to the Khor Maksar lines outside Aden. Sheikh Othman was abandoned to the Turks who, fortunately for the British, chose to halt there.

On July 9, the Viceroy of India decided that Lahej must be recaptured to restore British prestige, and that Aden must be reinforced. However, due to the limited availability of water it was not possible to build up the strength to a full division with complement of arms and services. Shaw reported back accordingly.

The Secretary of State for War, Lord Kitchener, immediately ordered that the 28th Indian Brigade in Egypt, commanded by Brigadier General George Younghusband, and two artillery batteries, be sent to Aden immediately. The Brigade consisted of the following:

• 51st Sikhs (Frontier Force).

• 53rd Sikhs (Frontier Force).

• 52nd Punjabis.

• 56th Punjabis.

• B Battery, Honourable Artillery Company (TF).

• Berkshire Battery, Royal Horse Artillery (TF).

• 5/1st Field Company.

The Berkshire Battery, based at Reading with a section at Ascot, was equipped with eight Quick Firing (QF) 15-pounders. In 1914 1/1st and 2/1st Berkshire Batteries had been merged to form the battery. B Battery initially supported the 22nd Mounted Brigade. The QF 15-pounder had a range of 6,400 yards and was the first British gun to have an on-carriage recoil system. First-line ammunition stocks included 600 rounds per gun.

While Younghusband regarded Aden a sideshow to operations in Mesopotamia and Palestine, its defence guarded the lines of communications to India and tied down VII (Yemen) Corps in South Arabia. He disagreed with the Viceroy of India's instruction that British prestige should be restored by recapturing Lahej, a view agreed in London, because he believed it would require a division to recapture and garrison the town and secure the lines of communication to Aden. He assured Southern Army:

"There is no cause for any alarm or despondency in situation here. Practically impossible for any hostile forces which could be brought against Aden to take it. I consider arrangements (by Shaw) quite secure and suitable but as soon as troops arrive from Egypt. I shall occupy Sheikh Othman as a detached post, strongly entrenching around water supply. I do not recommend any further military operations in this season."

Since Brigadier General Shaw intended to defend Aden from the Khor Maksar defence line, he requested the support of the monitors, HMS Severn and HMS Mersey, which were in East African waters, to defend his flanks, but his request for aeroplanes was refused. His imposition of martial law caused further anxiety in India. The arrival of the 108th Indian Infantry during the day allowed him to cancel the reinforcements from Somaliland. In India, 1/4th Hampshire Howitzer Battery (TF), 24th Hazara Mountain Battery and 51/1st Field Company, Bengal Sappers and Miners were earmarked for Aden.

Next day, Lake told Shaw he was being relieved by Younghusband and he was to remain at his disposal until further notice. Jacob would remain as senior Political Assistant. Captain Paige had written in the Garrison Diary that Political Officer [Jacob] should have accompanied Column. Shaw was permitted to keep for Aden two 5-inch coastal guns earmarked for Perim. Younghusband arrived on the light cruiser HMNZS Philomel, which had been lent by the Royal Navy to New Zealand and was the foundation on which the Royal New Zealand Navy was built. Meanwhile, one of the prisoners volunteered that the Turkish forces consisted of five weak battalions of about 350 men each, a mounted infantry squadron, ten mountain guns and about 400 Arab irregulars. Intelligence was then received on 14 July that the Turks did not intend to attack Aden during the month of Ramadan. The next day, 28th Brigade arrived with 3,500 men plus 567 mules and 532 horses.

== Battle ==
At 3 a.m. on the 21st July the advance began. The force consisted of the 51st and 53rd Sikhs, the 56th Rifles with a Battery of the Honourable Artillery Company. Just before daylight, they pushed across the causeway which is the sole passage through pans of salt water right across the isthmus and attacked Sheikh Othman at dawn.

The Turks in Sheikh Othman were apparently completely surprised, but as the leading troops reached the outskirts of the village fire was opened upon them from trenches to west of it, and a small counter-attack attempted against the left of the 51st Sikhs, on the left of the line. This was easily beaten off, and at 6 a.m. the Sikhs entered the village and drove out the enemy. They put up a "good little fight" before they were knocked through the village and five miles out the other side.

The infantry was forced to give up the pursuit after five or six miles until heat and sand forced the pursuit to be abandoned. The Aden Troop was not strong enough to interfere seriously with his retirement; the lack of cavalry prevented pursuit, otherwise, commented Younghusband, "we might have rounded up the lot there and then."

== Aftermath ==
The casualties of the Turks were estimated at 50 or 60 killed and several hundred prisoners who were mostly Arabs. They left behind a quantity of equipment; as Younghusband reported, "We took a good deal of stuff, rifles, ammunition etc."

The British casualties were 25, including two officers, or 8 killed and 26 wounded.

The damage to the water supply was quickly repaired, and within twenty-four hours water was flowing into Aden.

Sheikh Othman was fortified by General Younghusband, as it appeared to him to be the key to the defence of Aden. There remained to be solved the difficult problem of whether Lahej should be recaptured. It was decided that it would be unwise to make the advance unless the place were to be permanently occupied, which would involve the locking up of a brigade for the rest of the war.

General Younghusband therefore considered it his duty to hold Sheikh Othman and allow the Government to decide whether an advance to Lahej should be carried out. Shortly afterwards the 28th Brigade was ordered back to Egypt.

== Bibliography ==
- MacMunn, G. F.; Falls, C.; Becke, A. F. (1928). Military Operations: Egypt & Palestine. United Kingdom: H.M. Stationery Office.
- Arabian Studies. United Kingdom: C. Hurst. 1982.
- van der Bijl, Nicholas (2014). British Military Operations in Aden and Radfan: 100 Years of British Colonial Rule. United Kingdom: Pen & Sword Military. ISBN 9781473843110.
