= 28th Indian Brigade =

- Active: 19 October 1914 – February 1920
- Country: British India
- Allegiance: British Crown
- Branch: British Indian Army
- Type: Infantry
- Size: Brigade
- Part of: 10th Indian Division; 7th (Meerut) Division
- Engagements: First World War Sinai and Palestine Campaign Actions on the Suez Canal Battle of Sharon South Arabia Battle of Sheikh Othman Mesopotamian Campaign Battle of Sheikh Sa'ad Battle of Wadi (1916) Battle of Hanna Second Battle of Kut Fall of Baghdad (1917)

Commanders
- Notable commanders: Maj.-Gen. G.J. Younghusband; Maj.-Gen. G.V. Kemball

The 28th Indian Brigade (Note: The brigade is sometimes referred to as the 28th (Frontier Force) Brigade due to its composition of Frontier Force regiments.) was an infantry brigade of the British Indian Army that saw active service with the Indian Army during the First World War. Formed in October 1914, it defended the Suez Canal in early 1915, ended the Ottoman threat to Aden in July 1915, took part in the Mesopotamian Campaign in 1916 and 1917, before finishing the war in the Sinai and Palestine Campaign. It remained in Palestine until it was broken up in 1920.

== History ==
Egypt and Aden

The 28th Indian Brigade was formed in October 1914 as part of Indian Expeditionary Force F (along with the 29th and 30th Indian Brigades) and sent to Egypt.

After arriving in Egypt, it joined the 10th Indian Division when it was formed on 24 December. It served on the Suez Canal Defences, notably taking part in the Actions on the Suez Canal on 3–4 February 1915. In July 1915, the brigade was detached to Aden with 1/B Battery, HAC and 1/1st Berkshire Battery, RHA. They fought a sharp action at Sheikh Othman on 20 July that removed the Turkish threat to Aden for the rest of the war, before returning to Egypt in September. In November 1915, the brigade left the division and moved to Mesopotamia.

Mesopotamia

The brigade joined the 7th (Meerut) Division in December 1915 and, other than a short attachment to the 3rd (Lahore) Division (16 January 1916 to the end of the month), remained with the division for the rest of the war.

Initially, the division and brigade were heavily involved in the (ultimately futile) attempts to relieve the 6th (Poona) Division besieged at Kut, including the Action of Shaikh Saad (6–8 January 1916), the Action of the Wadi (13 January), the First action on the Hanna (21 January), and the First, Second and Third attacks on Sannaiyat (6, 9 and 22 April). The 6th (Poona) Division surrendered on 29 April 1916.

In 1917, the brigade took part in the Second Battle of Kut including the Capture of Sannaiyat (17–24 February) and the following advance to Baghdad including the Operations on the Tigris right bank (9–10 March), and the Occupation of Baghdad (11 March). The brigade then advanced to Samarra including the Actions of Mushahida (14 March), the action of Istabulat (21–22 April) and the Occupation of Samarra (24 April). The brigade's final action in Mesopotamia was the action of Daur (2 November).

Sinai and Palestine

In December 1917, it was decided to transfer a division to Egypt and the 7th (Meerut) Division was selected. It arrived in January 1918, and on 1 April took over the line from 52nd (Lowland) Division (transferred to the Western Front). The brigade remained in Palestine for the rest of the war, taking part in the Battles of Megiddo (18 September – 31 October 1918), in particular the Battle of Sharon.

After the Armistice of Mudros, the brigade remained with the division as part of the occupation of Palestine until broken up in February 1920.

== Order of battle ==
The brigade had the following composition during the First World War:

- 51st Sikhs (Frontier Force) (joined from Dargai, 1st (Peshawar) Division)
- 53rd Sikhs (Frontier Force) (joined from Kohat Brigade)
- 56th Punjabi Rifles (Frontier Force) (joined from Kohat Brigade)
- 1st Battalion, 5th Gurkha Rifles (Frontier Force) (joined from 3rd (Abbottabad) Brigade, 2nd (Rawalpindi) Division; left in May 1915 for 29th Indian Brigade)
- 125th Napier's Rifles (joined in June 1915 from 21st (Bareilly) Brigade, 7th (Meerut) Division; left on 12 June 1915 for 22nd (Lucknow) Brigade, 11th Indian Division)
- 62nd Punjabis (joined on 9 July 1915 from 22nd (Lucknow) Brigade, 11th Indian Division; left in September for Aden)
- 2nd Battalion, Leicestershire Regiment (joined on 17 November 1915 in Egypt from 20th (Garhwal) Brigade, 7th (Meerut) Division)
- Provisional Battalion, Oxfordshire and Buckinghamshire Light Infantry (attached January to June 1916) (Note: The Provisional Battalion, Oxfordshire and Buckinghamshire Light Infantry was formed from drafts of the 1st Battalion, OBLI besieged at Kut with the 6th (Poona) Division.)
- 136th Machine Gun Company (joined in August 1916; in March 1918 joined the divisional 7th Machine Gun Battalion)
- 28th Light Trench Mortar Battery ('F' Light Trench Mortar Battery joined the division in September 1917 and assigned to the brigade in December)

== Commanders ==
The brigade had the following commanders:

From	Rank	Name
19 October 1914	Major-General	G.J. Younghusband
23 December 1915	Major-General	G.V. Kemball
7 April 1916	Brigadier-General	A.M.S. Elsmie
6 July 1916	Brigadier-General	C.H. Davies

== See also ==
- Force in Egypt

== Bibliography ==
- Becke, Archibald F. (1936). Order of Battle of Divisions Part 2A. The Territorial Force Mounted Divisions and the 1st-Line Territorial Force Divisions (42–56). London: HMSO. OCLC 4405016.
- Farndale, General Sir Martin (1988). The Forgotten Fronts and the Home Base, 1914–18. History of the Royal Regiment of Artillery. Woolwich: The Royal Artillery Institution. ISBN 1-870114-05-1.
- Perry, F.W. (1993). Order of Battle of Divisions Part 5B. Indian Army Divisions. Newport: Ray Westlake Military Books. ISBN 1-871167-23-X.
