= Scallon =

Scallon is a surname. Notable people with the surname include:

- Dana Rosemary Scallon (born 1951), Irish singer and politician, known as Dana
- Robert Scallon (1857–1939), British officer in the Indian Army
- Rob Scallon (born 1990), American YouTuber and musician
