= 7th (Meerut) Division =

7th (Meerut) Indian Division
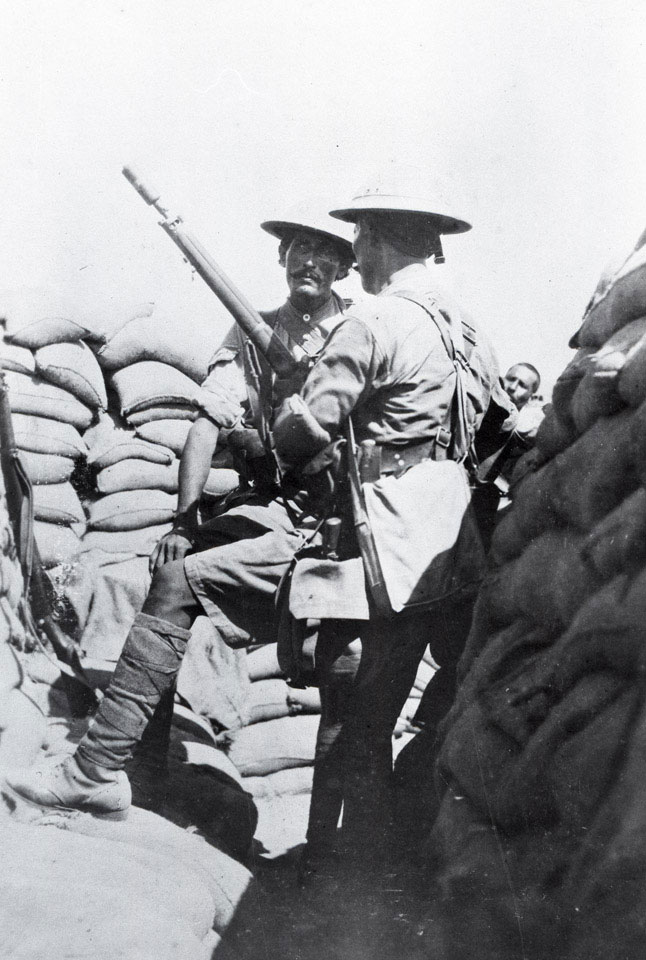
- Soldiers of the 7th (Meerut) Division man trenches in Mesopotamia, 1917.
- Active: 1829–1920
- Country: India
- Allegiance: British Crown; East India Company
- Branch: British Indian Army; Bengal Army
- Type: Infantry
- Size: Division
- Part of: Bengal Army/Northern Command
- Garrison/HQ: Meerut
- Engagements: Western Front: Battle of La Bassee; Battle of Messines (1914); Armentières; Battle of Neuve Chapelle; Battle of Aubers Ridge; Battle of Festubert; Battle of Loos; Mesopotamian campaign Palestine Campaign: Battle of Megiddo

Commanders
- Notable commanders: Maj-Gen Sir Claud Jacob (1915); Maj-Gen Sir George Younghusband (1915-16); Maj-Gen Sir Vere Fane (1918)

The 7th (Meerut) Division was an infantry division of the Indian Army and, before 1895, the Bengal Army, that saw active service during World War I.

== Pre-1857 ==
The Meerut Division first appeared in the Indian Army List in 1829, under the command of Sir Jasper Nicolls, KCB. At this period Divisions were primarily administrative organisations controlling the brigades and stations in their area, rather than field formations, but they did provide field forces when required. There were generally one Indian cavalry and two Indian infantry regiments stationed at Meerut itself, in addition to British troops: in 1829 these were the 4th Bengal Light Cavalry, 29th and 32nd Bengal Native Infantry.

== Indian Rebellion of 1857 ==
In May 1857, on the eve of the 'Indian Rebellion of 1857' (or 'First War of Independence'), the troops at Meerut comprised the 6th Dragoon Guards (Carabiniers) and a battalion of the 60th (King's Royal Rifle Corps), the 3rd Bengal Light Cavalry, and 11th and 20th Bengal Native Infantry under the command of Maj-Gen W.H. Hewitt. The outbreak of the rebellion at Meerut was one of the first and most serious of the whole conflict.

== Post-1857 ==
The division was reconstituted when peace returned. Over succeeding decades, the stations controlled by Meerut Division varied, and the forces under command were regularly rotated. For example:

=== Composition, January 1888 ===
General Officer Commanding (GOC): Maj-Gen Sir G.R. Greave, KCB, KCMG

Divisional HQ: Meerut

- F Battery, A Brigade, Royal Horse Artillery
- L Battery, A Brigade, Royal Horse Artillery
- H Battery, 2nd Brigade, Royal Artillery
- L Battery, 3rd Brigade, Royal Artillery
- K Battery, 4th Brigade, Royal Artillery
- 3rd Hussars
- 1st Battalion, King's Own Scottish Borderers
- 5th Regiment Bengal Cavalry
- 26th (Punjab) Regiment, Bengal Native Infantry

Fatehgarh:

- Detachment 2nd Battalion Northumberland Fusiliers
- Detachment 22nd Bengal Native Infantry

Agra Brigade:

- 2nd Battalion Manchester Regiment
- 28th (Punjab) Regiment Bengal Native Infantry
- Depot 33rd Regiment Bengal Native Infantry
- 16th (The Lucknow Regiment) Bengal Native Infantry

Muttra:

- 3rd Dragoon Guards

Dehra Dun:

- Governor General’s Bodyguard
- 1st & 2nd Battalions 2nd (Prince of Wales's Own) Goorkha Regiment (The Sirmoor Rifles)

Delhi:

- Wing, 2nd Battalion Lincolnshire Regiment
- 8th Battery, 1st Brigade, Scottish Division Garrison Artillery, Royal Artillery
- 22nd Bengal Native Infantry

Landour:

- Convalescent Depot

Roorki:

- H Company, Royal Engineers
- HQ, A (Depot) Company, B (Recruit) Company, 3, 4, & 5 Companies, Bengal Sappers and Miners
- 2nd Battalion Lincolnshire Regiment
- 1st & 2nd Batteries, 1st Brigade, Welsh Division Garrison Artillery, Royal Artillery
- 4th Battery, 1st Brigade, Eastern Division Garrison Artillery, Royal Artillery

Chakrata:

- 4th Battalion Rifle Brigade

== Pre–World War I ==
Under the reforms introduced by Lord Roberts as Commander-in-Chief (CinC) India, the Divisions were renamed 1st Class Districts in 1890. In the next round of reforms inaugurated by Lord Kitchener as CinC, they became numbered divisions with their territorial affiliation as a subsidiary title. The title 7th (Meerut) Division first appeared in the Army List between 30 September and 31 December 1904, as part of Western (later Northern) Command. On the eve of World War I, the division had its HQ at Mussoorie, and had the Meerut Cavalry Brigade and the Bareilly (HQ Ranikhet), Dehra Dun and Garhwal (HQ Lansdowne) Infantry Brigades under command.

== World War I ==
=== Western Front ===
In 1914 the 7th (Meerut) Division was part of Indian Expeditionary Force A sent to reinforce the British Expeditionary Force (BEF) fighting in France. The bulk constituted an infantry division as part of Indian Corps, while the Meerut Cavalry Brigade was detached to form part of 2nd Indian Cavalry Division in the Indian Cavalry Corps. While in France the division was known as the Meerut Division, and its brigades by their names, to avoid confusion with the 7th British Division. Despatch from India was delayed by the activities of the German raiders Emden and Konigsberg operating in the Indian Ocean, and by the slow speed of the transport vessels. The division landed at Marseille 12–14 October 1914 but there were further delays while the troops were re-armed with the latest pattern rifle and the supply train could be improvised, using tradesmen's vans procured locally. The division finally got into action at the Battles of La Bassee, 1st Messines and Armentieres in October and November 1914.

==== Order of Battle, October 1914 ====
GOC: Lt Gen C.A. Anderson, CB
GSO1: Col C.W. Jacob

Dehra Dun Brigade GOC: Brig-Gen C.E. Johnson

- 1st Bn. Seaforth Highlanders
- 6th Jat Light Infantry
- 2/2nd King Edward's Own Gurkha Rifles (The Sirmoor Regiment)
- 1/9th Gurkha Rifles

Garhwal Brigade GOC: Maj-Gen H.D’U. Keary, CB, DSO

- 2nd Bn. Leicestershire Regiment
- 1/39th Garhwal Rifles
- 2/39th Garhwal Rifles
- 2/3rd Gurkha Rifles

Bareilly Brigade GOC: Maj-Gen F. Macbean, CVO, CB

- 2nd Bn. Black Watch
- 41st Dogras
- 58th Vaughan's Rifles (Frontier Force)
- 2/8th Gurkha Rifles

Divisional Mounted Troops

- 4th Cavalry

Divisional Artillery

- IV Brigade, Royal Field Artillery (RFA) - replaced V Brigade (transferred to 3rd (Lahore) Division) 17 October 1914
  - 7th, 14th & 66th Batteries, IV Brigade Ammunition Column
- IX Brigade, RFA
  - 19th, 20th & 28th Batteries, IX Brigade Ammunition Column
- XIII Brigade, RFA - replaced XI Brigade (transferred to 3rd (Lahore) Division 17 October 1914
  - 2nd, 8th & 44th Batteries, XIII Brigade Ammunition Column
- 110th Heavy Battery, Royal Garrison Artillery
  - Heavy Battery Ammunition Column
- Meerut Divisional Ammunition Column

Engineers

- 3rd & 4th Companies, 1st King George's Own Sappers and Miners

Signals Service

- Meerut Signal Company

Divisional Pioneers

- 107th Pioneers

Supply & Transport:

- Meerut Divisional train

Medical Units:

- 19th & 20th British Field Ambulances
- 128th, 129th and 130th Indian Field Ambulances

After winter operations (in which the Indian soldiers suffered badly) the division next took part in the Battles of Neuve Chapelle, Aubers Ridge, Festubert and Loos in 1915.

==== Order of Battle, May 1915 ====
The division's composition at this time was: GOC: Lieut-Gen Sir Charles Anderson, KCB

Dehra Dun Brigade
GOC: Brig-Gen C.W. Jacob

- 1st Bn. Seaforth Highlanders
- 1/4th Bn. Seaforth Highlanders (Territorial Force)
- 6th Jat Light Infantry
- 2nd Bn. 2nd King Edward's Own Gurkha Rifles (The Sirmoor Regiment)
- 1st Bn. 9th Gurkha Rifles

Garwhal Brigade
GOC: Brig-Gen C.G. Blackader

- 2nd Bn. Leicestershire Regiment
- 1/3rd Bn. London Regiment (Territorial Force)
- 39th Garhwal Rifles
- 2nd Bn. 3rd Gurkha Rifles
- 2nd Bn. 8th Gurkha Rifles

Bareilly Brigade
GOC: Brig-Gen W.M. Southey

- 2nd Bn. Black Watch
- 1/4th Bn. Black Watch (Territorial Force)
- 41st Dogras
- 58th Vaughan's Rifles (Frontier Force)
- 125th Napier's Rifles

Divisional Troops
As before, with the addition of 30th Battery of XLIII (Howitzer Brigade) RFA.

By the Battle of Loos in September 1915, Maj-Gen Claud Jacob had replaced Anderson as GOC of 7th (Meerut) Division, and the exhausted 6th Jats and 41st Dogras had been replaced by the 93rd Burma Infantry and 33rd Punjabis (from Egypt), while 30th Battery, XLII (How) Bde had been replaced by 61st Battery, VIII (How) Bde, RFA.

=== Mesopotamia ===
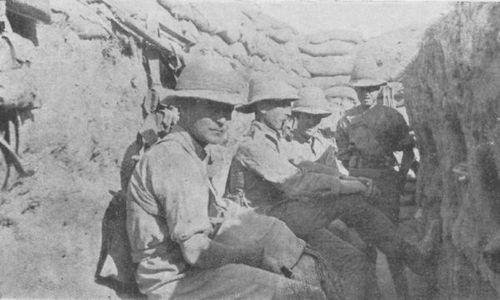
Tommies of the 2nd Battalion, Black Watch in the "Saniyat" trenches during the Mesopotamian campaign, 1917.

On 13 August 1915, General Sir John Nixon, commanding Indian Expeditionary Force D in Mesopotamia, requested one of the Indian infantry divisions in France as reinforcements for his advance on Baghdad. Coincidentally, on the same day, the Secretary of State for India, Austen Chamberlain, told the Viceroy of India that he was anxious for the Indian infantry to be withdrawn from France before they had to endure another winter. The system for supplying drafts had broken down and the Indian battalions were becoming very weak after the heavy casualties they had suffered. Although the Secretary of State for War, Lord Kitchener, objected to the Indian withdrawal from the Western Front, orders were issued on 31 October for the two divisions of Indian Corps (3rd (Lahore) and 7th (Meerut) Division) to embark at Marseille for Mesopotamia. They were to leave behind their attached Territorial Force battalions. The two divisions were relieved in the front line on 6 November and were due at Basra on 1 December, but their departure from Marseille was delayed until after 25 December because of fear of submarine attack. 7th (Meerut) Division finally arrived in Mesopotamia in Spring 1917 and joined Tigris Corps, too late to relieve the 6th (Poona) Division at Kut-al-Amara.

The division participated in the battles at the Sheikh Sa'ad, Wadi, Hanna, Dujailia, and the Sannaiyat. After the fall of Kut, as part of the reorganization of the British and Indian forces in the region, the division spent much of the summer and fall refitting. The Meerut and Lahore Divisions would eventually become part of the I Indian Army Corps, part of the newly formed Mesopotamian Expeditionary Force, participating in the capture of Baghdad in March 1917.

=== Palestine ===
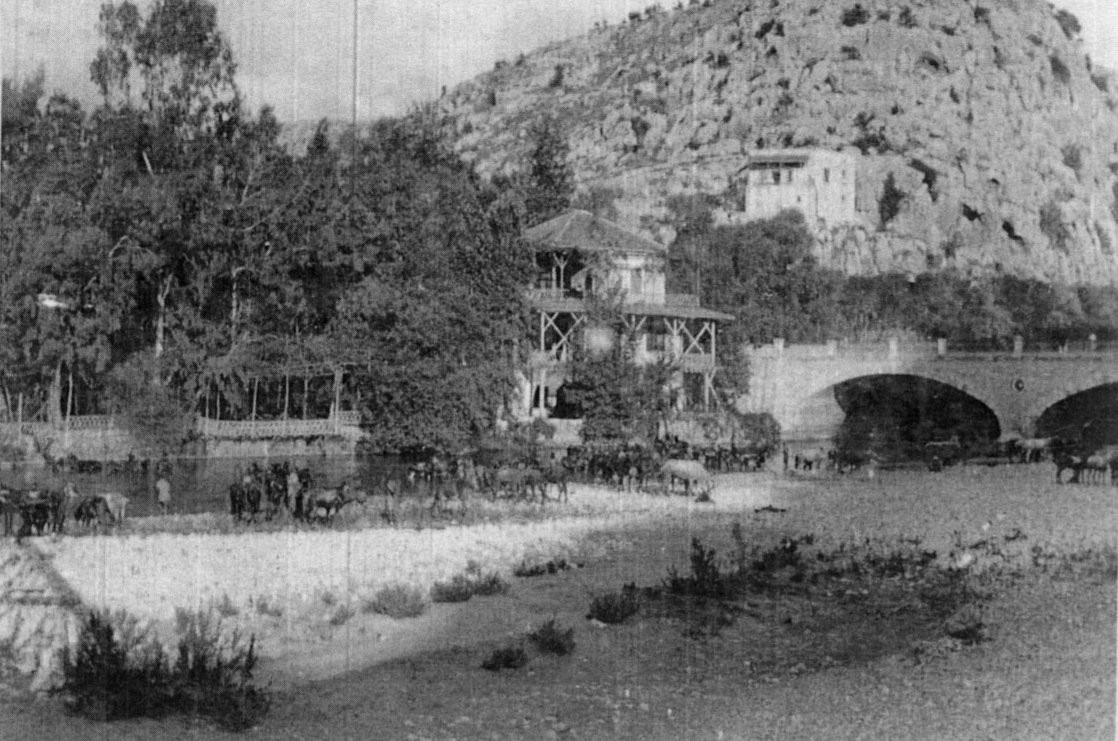
The Meerut Division at Nahr al-Kalb (Dog river) in Lebanon, October 1918

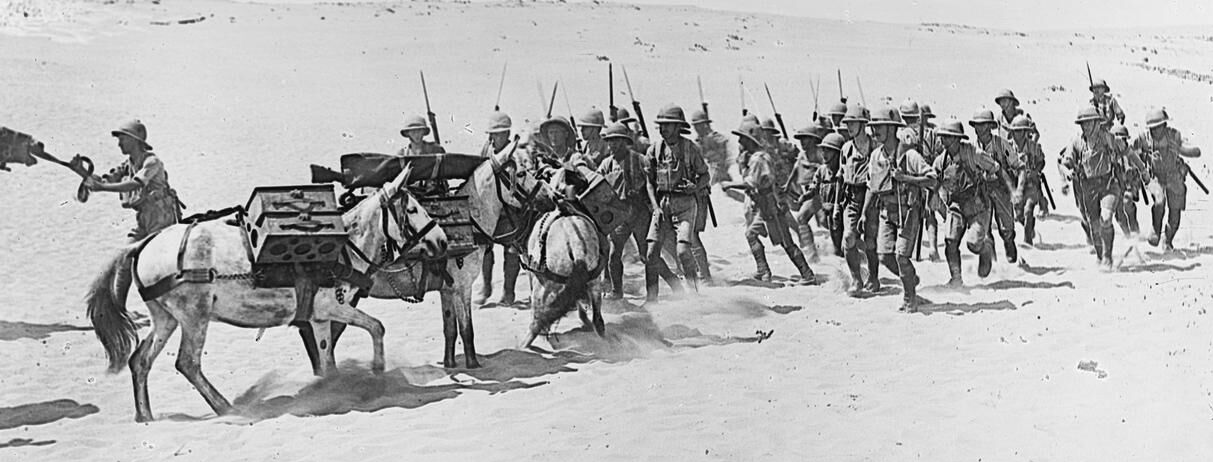
Lewis gun section of the 2nd Battalion, Leicestershire Regiment with their mules at Arsuf Coastal Sector, summer 1918

After the fall of Baghdad, the Palestine Campaign was given priority over Mesopotamia, and in December 1917 Sir Edmund Allenby, commanding the Egyptian Expeditionary Force (EEF), was informed that after he had captured Jerusalem he would be reinforced by the 7th (Meerut) Division from Mesopotamia. The division moved from Mesopotamia to Egypt in December, and then on 1 April 1918 it relieved the 52nd (Lowland) Division, which was on its way to the Western Front. The two divisions exchanged their artillery units, those that had been serving with 7th (Meerut) Division going to the Western Front, and the Territorial Force brigades of 52nd (Lowland) Divisional Artillery served with 7th (Meerut) Division until the end of the war.

The EEF undertook few operations during the hot weather of Summer 1918, but the Meerut Division captured 'North Sister' and 'South Sister' Hills on 8 June, and raided 'Piffer Ridge' on 27 June. It subsequently took part in Allenby's advance through Palestine, including the Battle of Megiddo as part of Lieutenant-General Bulfin's XXI British Corps operating on the right flank.

==== Order of Battle September 1918 ====
In September 1918, the division had the following composition:

GOC: Maj-Gen Sir Vere Fane

19th (Dehra Dun) Brigade:
GOC: Brig-Gen G.A. Weir

- 1st Bn. Seaforth Highlanders
- 28th Punjabis
- 92nd Punjabis
- 125th Napier's Rifles

21st (Bareilly) Brigade:
GOC: Brig-Gen A.G. Kemball

- 1st Bn. The Black Watch (Royal Highlanders)
- 1st Bn. Queen Victoria's Own Corps of Guides (Frontier Force) (Lumsden's) Infantry
- 20th Punjabis
- 1/8th Gurkha Rifles

28th Brigade (Frontier Force):
GOC: Brig-Gen C.H. Davies

- 2nd Bn. The Leicestershire Regiment
- 51st Sikhs (Frontier Force)
- 53rd Sikhs (Frontier Force)
- 56th Punjabi Rifles

Divisional Artillery:

- CCLXI Brigade, RFA
  - A, B, C Btys
- CCLXII Brigade, RFA
  - A, B, 438 Btys
- CCLXIV Brigade, RFA
  - 422, 423, C Btys

Divisional Engineers:

- 522nd (1/6th London) Field Company, Royal Engineers
- 3rd & 4th Companies, 1st KGOS&M

Divisional Pioneers:

- 121st Pioneers

=== General Officers Commanding ===
The following officers commanded the division during World War I:

- Lt-Gen Sir Charles Anderson, from 21 December 1913
- Maj-Gen Claud Jacob from 7 September to 17 November 1915
- Maj-Gen Sir George Younghusband from 10 December 1915 to 8 May 1916
- Brig-Gen Charles Edward de Mealy Norie (acting) from 8 May 1916
- Maj-Gen Alexander Cobbe, VC, from 25 June 1916
- Maj-Gen Vere Fane from 3 September 1916

== See also ==
- List of Indian divisions in World War I

== Bibliography ==
- Maj A.F. Becke,History of the Great War: Order of Battle of Divisions, Part 2a: The Territorial Force Mounted Divisions and the 1st-Line Territorial Force Divisions (42–56), London: HM Stationery Office, 1935/Uckfield: Naval & Military Press, 2007, ISBN 1-847347-39-8.
- Maj A.F. Becke,History of the Great War: Order of Battle of Divisions, Part 2b: The 2nd-Line Territorial Force Divisions (57th–69th), with the Home-Service Divisions (71st–73rd) and 74th and 75th Divisions, London: HM Stationery Office, 1937/Uckfield: Naval & Military Press, 2007, ISBN 1-847347-39-8.
- Bullock, David L. (1988). Allenby’s War: the Palestine-Arabian Campaigns 1916–1918. London: Blandford. ISBN 0-7137-1869-2.
- Edmonds, Brig-Gen Sir James E. (1995) [1st. Pub. Macmillan:1925]. History of the Great War: Military Operations, France and Belgium, 1914. Vol. II: Antwerp, La Bassee, Armentieres, Messines, and Ypres, October–November 1914. London: Imperial War Museum. ISBN 1-870423-55-0.
- Edmonds, Brig-Gen Sir James E.; Wynne, Captain G.C. (1928). History of the Great War: Military Operations, France and Belgium, 1915. Vol. II: Battle of Aubers Ridge, Festubert, and Loos. London: Macmillan.
- Maj D.K. Edwards, A History of the 1st Middlesex Volunteer Engineers (101 (London) Engineer Regiment, TA) 1860–1967, London, 1967.
- Capt Cyril Falls, History of the Great War: Military Operations, Egypt and Palestine, Vol II, From June 1917 to the End of the War, Part I, London: HM Stationery Office, 1930/Uckfield: Naval & Military Press, 2013, ISBN 978-1-84574-951-4.
- Capt Cyril Falls, History of the Great War: Military Operations, Egypt and Palestine, Vol II, From June 1917 to the End of the War, Part II, London: HM Stationery Office, 1930/Uckfield: Naval & Military Press, 2013, ISBN 978-1-84574-950-7.
- Haythornthwaite, Philip J. (1996). The World War One Source Book. London: Arms and Armour Press. ISBN 1-85409-351-7.
- Moberly, Brig-Gen F.J. (1924). History of the Great War: Military Operations: The Campaign in Mesopotamia. Vol. II. London: HMSO.
- Moberly, Brig-Gen F.J. (1927). History of the Great War: Military Operations: The Campaign in Mesopotamia. Vol. IV. London: HMSO.
- Perry, F.W. (1993). Order of Battle of Divisions Part 5B. Indian Army Divisions. Newport: Ray Westlake Military Books. ISBN 1-871167-23-X.
- David, Saul (2002). The Indian Mutiny of 1857. London: Viking. ISBN 0-670-91137-2.

=== External links ===
- British Empire has list of all Indian Army regiments with pictures of their regimental badges.
- The Long Long Trail
- "7th (Meerut) Division on The Regimental Warpath 1914 - 1918 by PB Chappell". Archived from the original on 17 May 2008.
