= Alfred Martin (Indian Army officer) =

Lieutenant-General Sir Alfred Martin KCB
- Born: 30 March 1853
- Died: 27 October 1926 (aged 73)
- Military career
- Allegiance: United Kingdom
- Branch: Indian Army
- Service years: 1874-1912
- Rank: Lieutenant-General
- Commands: 1st Bn 5th Gurkha Rifles; 2nd (Rawalpindi) Division
- Conflicts: Second Anglo-Afghan War; Tirah campaign
- Awards: Knight Commander of the Order of the Bath

Lieutenant-General Sir Alfred Robert Martin KCB (30 March 1853 – 27 October 1926) was a British officer in the Indian Army.

== Military career ==
Martin joined the 13th Regiment of Foot as a lieutenant on 2 December 1874. He transferred to Bengal Staff Corps in 1877 and took part in the Jowahi-Afreedees expedition in 1877 and fought at the Battle of Kandahar in September 1880 during the Second Anglo-Afghan War. Promoted to captain on 2 December 1885, he was commanding officer of 1st Battalion 5th Gurkha Rifles for the Miranzai expedition in 1891, received the brevet rank of major on 1 September 1891, and became Assistant Adjutant General, Punjab in 1892. He then took part in various expeditions on the North West Frontier of India in the 1890s, received the substantive rank of major on 2 December 1894, and the brevet rank of lieutenant-colonel on 28 August 1895. He was appointed Assistant Adjutant General for the Tirah Campaign in 1897 and then became Deputy Adjutant General, India in 1899, with the rank of colonel. Promoted to the substantive rank of lieutenant-colonel on 2 December 1900, he was in March 1902 appointed Deputy Adjutant General, Bengal, with the temporary rank of brigadier-general. He went on to be a Brigade Commander in India in 1904, Adjutant-General, India in 1906 and General Officer Commanding 2nd (Rawalpindi) Division in 1908. He was promoted to lieutenant general in July 1909 before retiring in September 1912.

He was Colonel of the 5th Gurkha Rifles from 28 June 1921 up to his death.

Military offices
Preceded by Beauchamp Duff	Adjutant-General, India; 1906–1908	Succeeded by Robert Scallon
