= Arthur Barrett (Indian Army officer) =

Indian Army officer (1857–1926)

Field Marshal Sir Arthur Barrett GCB GCSI KCVO
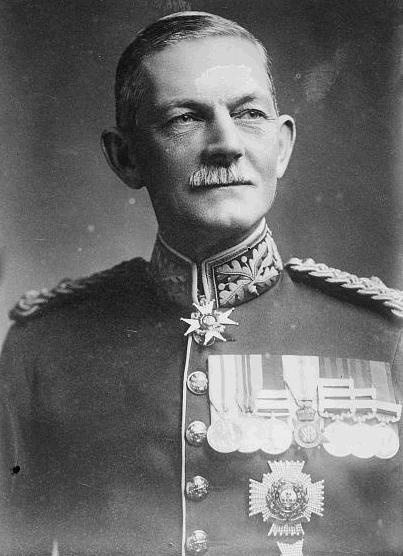
- Lieutenant-General Sir Arthur Barrett, c. 1915
- Born: Arthur Arnold Barrett; 3 June 1857; Carshalton, Surrey, England
- Died: 20 October 1926 (aged 69); Sharnbrook, Bedfordshire, England
- Military career
- Allegiance: United Kingdom
- Branch: Indian Army
- Service years: 1875–1920
- Rank: Field Marshal
- Unit: 5th Gurkha Rifles (Frontier Force)
- Commands: 6th (Poona) Division; Northern Army, India
- Conflicts: Second Anglo-Afghan War; North-West Frontier; Hunza-Nagar Campaign; Tirah campaign; First World War; Third Anglo-Afghan War
- Awards: Knight Grand Cross of the Order of the British Empire; Knight Grand Cross of the Order of the Star of India; Knight Commander of the Royal Victorian Order

Field Marshal Sir Arthur Arnold Barrett, GCB, GCSI, KCVO (3 June 1857 – 20 October 1926) was a British officer of the Indian Army. He saw action at the Siege of the Sherpur Cantonment in December 1879 and at the Battle of Kandahar in September 1880 during the Second Anglo-Afghan War and went on to serve in the Hunza-Nagar Campaign in 1891. During the First World War he was General Officer Commanding the Poona Division which successfully took Basra in Mesopotamia in November 1914 and then Al-Qurnah in Mesopotamia in December 1914. Returning to India in the spring of 1915, he spent the remainder of the First World War in command of Northern Army in which role he took part in operations against the Mahsuds in Spring 1917. He saw action again as the senior British commander on the ground during the Third Anglo-Afghan War in 1919 before retiring in May 1920.

== Early life and service ==
Born the son of Alfred Barrett (a clergyman) and Emma Barrett (née Collins), Barrett was commissioned a sub-lieutenant in the 44th Regiment of Foot on 10 September 1875 and immediately sailed to join his regiment in Secunderabad, India. He was promoted to lieutenant in June 1878 with seniority backdated to the date of his commission. He transferred from the 44th Foot to the Indian Staff Corps on 17 January 1879 and was posted to the 3rd Sikhs, a regiment of the Punjab Frontier Force, and saw action at the Siege of the Sherpur Cantonment in December 1879 and at the Battle of Kandahar in September 1880 during the Second Anglo-Afghan War.

Barrett transferred to the 1st battalion the 5th Gurkha Rifles in 1882 and, having been promoted to captain on 10 September 1886, he took part in the Hunza-Nagar Campaign in 1891.

== Later service in India ==
Promoted to major on 10 September 1895, Barrett became deputy assistant quartermaster-general and then assistant quartermaster-general of the large force mobilised for the Tirah Campaign in 1897. He was mentioned in dispatches and promoted to brevet lieutenant-colonel on 20 May 1898 on appointment as assistant adjutant-general of the Punjab Frontier Force. He became Commanding Officer of the 1st battalion the 5th Gurkha Rifles in 1899 and received promotion to the substantive rank of lieutenant-colonel on 10 September 1901 and to brevet colonel on 11 October 1902. He was appointed Companion of the Order of the Bath (CB) in 1903 and became deputy adjutant-general at Northern Command in India with the substantive rank of colonel on 20 February 1905. He was promoted major-general on 1 December 1906 and given command of the Nowshera Brigade on 29 March 1907. He commanded the second brigade in the Bazar Valley Campaign in February 1908 and operations against the Mohmands a few months later and for this he was advanced to Knight Commander of the Order of the Bath (KCB) on 14 August 1908. He was appointed Adjutant-General, India on 1 April 1909 and, having been promoted to lieutenant general on 23 October 1911, he was appointed to command the Poona Division on 21 February 1912. He was appointed Knight Commander of the Royal Victorian Order (KCVO) on 14 January 1912.

== First World War and aftermath ==
On the declaration of war on the Ottoman Empire in November 1914 Barrett was sent to Mesopotamia with his division and occupied the city of Basra later that month. Before the end of the year he had pushed forwards to occupy Al-Qurnah. When the troops in Mesopotamia were reorganised as a corps under John Nixon in 1915 he retained command of the 6th Division, but soon resigned due to ill-health, passing command, in April 1915, to Charles Townshend. He returned to India, was appointed Knight Commander of the Order of the Star of India (KCSI), and became General Officer Commanding the Northern Army on 31 May 1916. He commanded operations against the Mahsuds in March to August 1917. Promoted to full general on 1 August 1917, he was appointed ADC General to the King on 3 November 1917 and was promoted to Knight Grand Cross of the Order of the Bath (GCB) in the 1918 King's Birthday Honours.

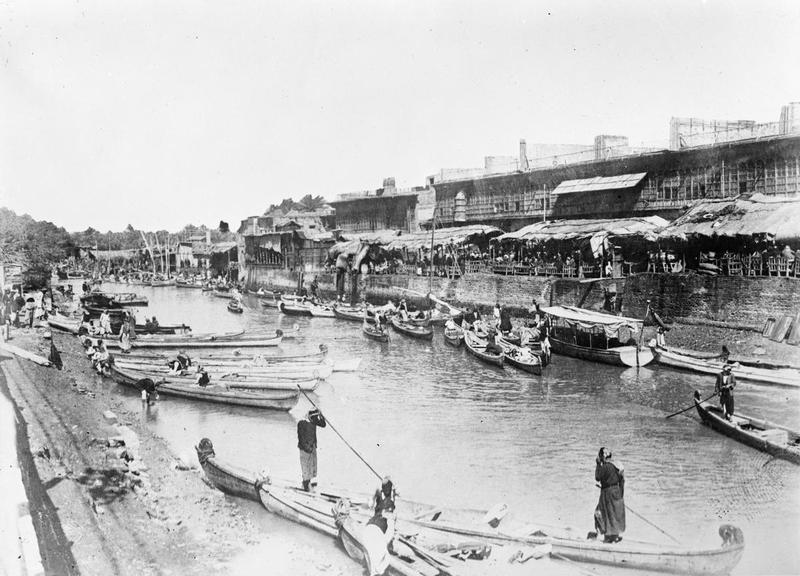
Barratt, in his capacity as General Officer Commanding the Poona Division, captured the City of Basra in November 1914

When the Third Anglo-Afghan War broke out in May 1919 Barrett was given command of the North-West Frontier Force and was the senior officer on the ground throughout the war. He was promoted to Knight Grand Commander of the Order of the Star of India (GCSI) on 1 January 1920.

== Retirement ==
Barrett retired from the Indian Army on 31 May 1920. He was promoted to field marshal on 12 April 1921 and received the Japanese Order of the Rising Sun 1st Class on 19 August 1921.

He died at the age of 69 at his home in Sharnbrook, Bedfordshire on 20 October 1926.

== Family ==
In 1894 Barrett married Mary Haye; they had one daughter. After his first wife died he married Ella Lafone in 1907; they had no children.

== Sources ==
- Heathcote, Tony (1999). The British Field Marshals 1736–1997. Barnsley (UK): Pen & Sword. ISBN 0-85052-696-5.

Military offices
Preceded by Robert Scallon	Adjutant-General, India; 1909–1912	Succeeded by Fenton Aylmer
Preceded by Sir John Nixon	GOC-in-C, Northern Army, India; 1916–1920	Succeeded by Sir William Birdwood
