= George Kemball =

British Army general (1859–1941)

Major-General Sir George Kemball KCMG CB DSO
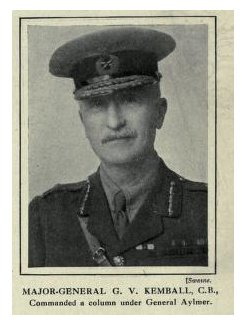
- Born: 1 October 1858; Fairseat, Wrotham, United Kingdom
- Died: 10 January 1941 (aged 83)
- Military career
- Allegiance: United Kingdom
- Branch: British Army
- Service years: 1878–1919
- Rank: Major-General
- Unit: Royal Artillery
- Commands: 28th Indian Brigade; 5th (Mhow) Division
- Conflicts: Second Anglo-Afghan War (1878–1880); Chitral Expedition (1895); Tochi Expedition (1897); Kaduna Expedition (1900); Bida Expedition (1901); Kano-Sokoto Expedition (1903); World War I Kût'ül-Amâre Kuşatması
- Awards: Distinguished Service Order (1901); Companion of the Order of the Bath (1903); Knight Commander of the Order of St Michael and St George (1917)

Major-General Sir George Vere Kemball KCMG CB DSO (1 October 1859 – 10 January 1941) was a British Army officer of the 19th and early 20th century. He was a career officer in the British Army spending most of his career in India and Nigeria.

== Early life and family ==
George Kemball was the son of Major-General John Shaw Kemball. He had a younger brother, Arnold Henry Grant Kemball, who commanded the 54th (Kootenay) Battalion of the Canadian Expeditionary Force during the First World War. His father and uncle were both generals in the British Army. His grandfather, Vero Shaw Kemball, had been the Surgeon-General for Bombay. Other ancestors served various regiments of the British Army, including the Black Watch, as well as the Indian Army. In 1889, he married Hattie Elliot. With his brother, he attended Twyford before going to Harrow.

== Military career ==
=== Early career ===
After attending Twyford School and Harrow, he obtained a commission as a lieutenant in the Royal Artillery in 1878. After serving in the Second Afghan War (1878–1880), he was promoted to captain in 1886. In 1895, he was assigned to the staff of the Chitral Relief Force, working as the Deputy Assistant Quartermaster General for Intelligence, for which he was mentioned in dispatches and be brevetted to major. In September 1896, he was promoted to major.

In 1897 Kemball took part in the Tochi Expedition along the North-West Frontier, for which he was also mentioned in dispatches, and in 1900 he first saw action in Africa, campaigning in Nigeria in the Kaduna Expedition. The following year he took command of an expedition against the Bida and Kontagora in January 1901, for which he would receive the Distinguished Service Order (DSO) in April 1902.

Kemball was appointed Inspector general and thus acting commander of the West African Frontier Force in January 1901, holding this position until 1905, with the local rank of brigadier-general. He was also promoted to the substantive rank of lieutenant-colonel in 1901. In late 1902 he started an extended tour inspecting the colonies of Northern Nigeria, Southern Nigeria and Lagos. He commanded British forces in the Kano-Sokoto Expedition in 1903, for which he was rewarded with a Companion of the Order of the Bath (CB).

=== Service in Nigeria and first commands ===
After the Kano-Sokoto Expedition, Kemball, promoted to brevet colonel in July 1904 and again to colonel in September, was recalled to London, where he was involved in the recruiting and selection of personnel for service in Nigeria. In April 1907, after coming off half-pay, he was appointed an assistant quartermaster general. From 1909 until 1913, he worked at the War Office and was then placed on half-pay in April. In 1914, he returned to India, where he was given command of a brigade and promoted to major general.

=== Great War service ===
During World War I, Kemball served in Mesopotamia and was involved in efforts to relieve the Siege of Kut. He commanded the 28th Indian Brigade of the 7th (Meerut) Division through the battles of 1916. He was wounded at the Battle of Sanniyat in April 1916. For his service in the Mesopotamian Campaign, he was knighted and made a Knight Commander of Order of St Michael and St George.

After his service in the Mesopotamian Campaign, he returned to India, where he was given command of 5th (Mhow) Division in 1917. He remained in command of the division until 1919. After his retirement, from 1927 to 1929 he served as the colonel commandant of the Royal Artillery.

Kemball died in 1941, survived by his wife and children.
