= George Younghusband =

British colonial military general

Major-General Sir George Younghusband KCMG KCIE CB
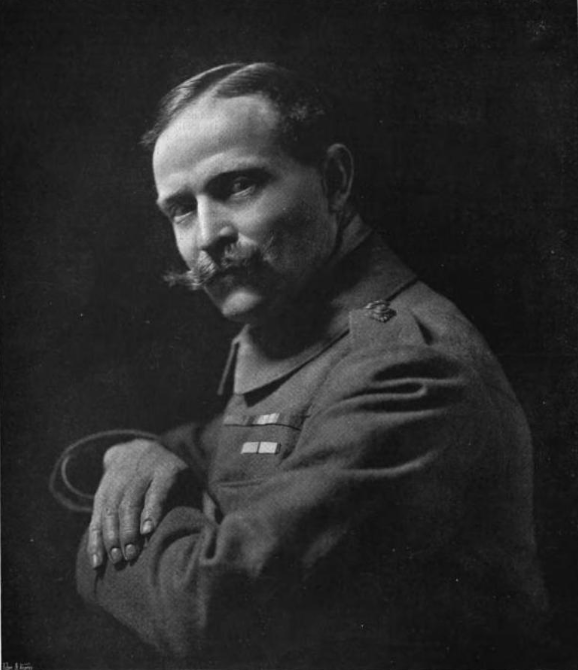
- Born: 9 July 1859; Dharmasala, India
- Died: 30 September 1944 (aged 85); Crickhowell, Wales
- Relatives: John Younghusband (father); Francis Younghusband (brother); Charles Younghusband (uncle); George Younghusband (son); Eileen Younghusband (niece)
- Military career
- Allegiance: British Empire
- Branch: British Indian Army
- Service years: 1878–1917
- Rank: Major-General
- Units: 17th Foot; Queen Victoria's Own Corps of Guides
- Commands: Queen Victoria's Own Corps of Guides; 3rd Battalion Imperial Yeomanry; 26th (Younghusband's Horse) Battalion Imperial Yeomanry; Fyzabad Brigade; Derajat Brigade; Aden Brigade; 28th Indian Brigade; 7th (Meerut) Division
- Conflicts: Second Afghan War; Mahdist War; North West Frontier; Third Burmese War; Chitral Expedition; Spanish–American War; Second Boer War; Mohmand expedition of 1908; First World War
- Other work: Keeper of the Jewel House; Author

Major-General Sir George John Younghusband, KCMG, KCIE, CB (9 July 1859 – 30 September 1944) was a cavalry officer and major-general in the British Indian Army.

Younghusband was commissioned into the 17th Foot in 1878. He later transferred to the British Indian Army's Guides Cavalry and served in several conflicts, including the Second Afghan War, the Mahdist War, the Third Burmese War, the Second Boer War and finally in the First World War. Due to wounds received on the battlefield, he was forced to retire from the army in 1917.

In his later life he became a noted author of several books, and the Keeper of the Jewel House at the Tower of London, until his death on 30 September 1944, at Crickhowell in Wales.

== Early life ==
George John Younghusband was born on 9 July 1859, at Dharamshala in India, the eldest son of Major-General John William Younghusband and Clara Jane Shaw, and the elder brother of Francis Younghusband. He was educated at Clifton College and the Royal Military College Sandhurst. In May 1878, after successfully passing out, he was commissioned, as a second-lieutenant, into the 17th Foot, on probation for the India Staff Corps. He fought in the Second Afghan War and was promoted to lieutenant on 15 March 1880, before transferring to the India Staff Corps, in October 1883.

== Indian Army ==
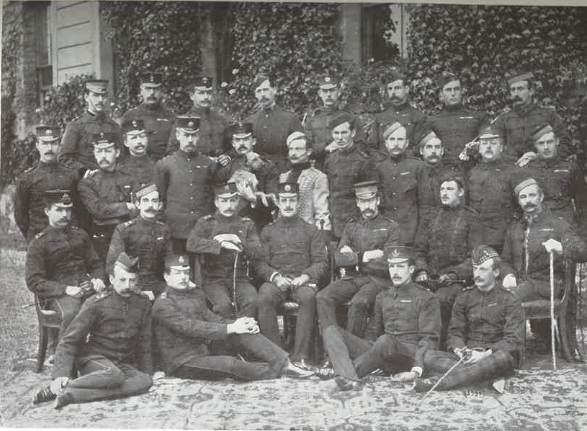
The Staff College, Camberley, class in 1890. Stood in the second row, sixth from the left, is Captain G. J. Younghusband.

After joining the Indian Army he was involved in several conflicts in a short period of time. The 1885 Mahdist War, operations on the North West Frontier in 1886, and in the Third Burmese War. His next promotion came on 1 May 1889, when he was promoted to captain. Six years later, in 1895, he was mentioned in dispatches, while serving as the brigade major for the 4th Brigade, part of the Chitral Relief Force. He was further recognized by promotion to brevet major in January 1896. The following year, he was on 22 January 1897 appointed to a staff position as deputy assistant adjutant-general in Sirhind, under the Punjab Command. In 1898 he was appointed as a military observer during the Spanish–American War in the Philippines, and in May that year promoted to substantive major.

== Command ==
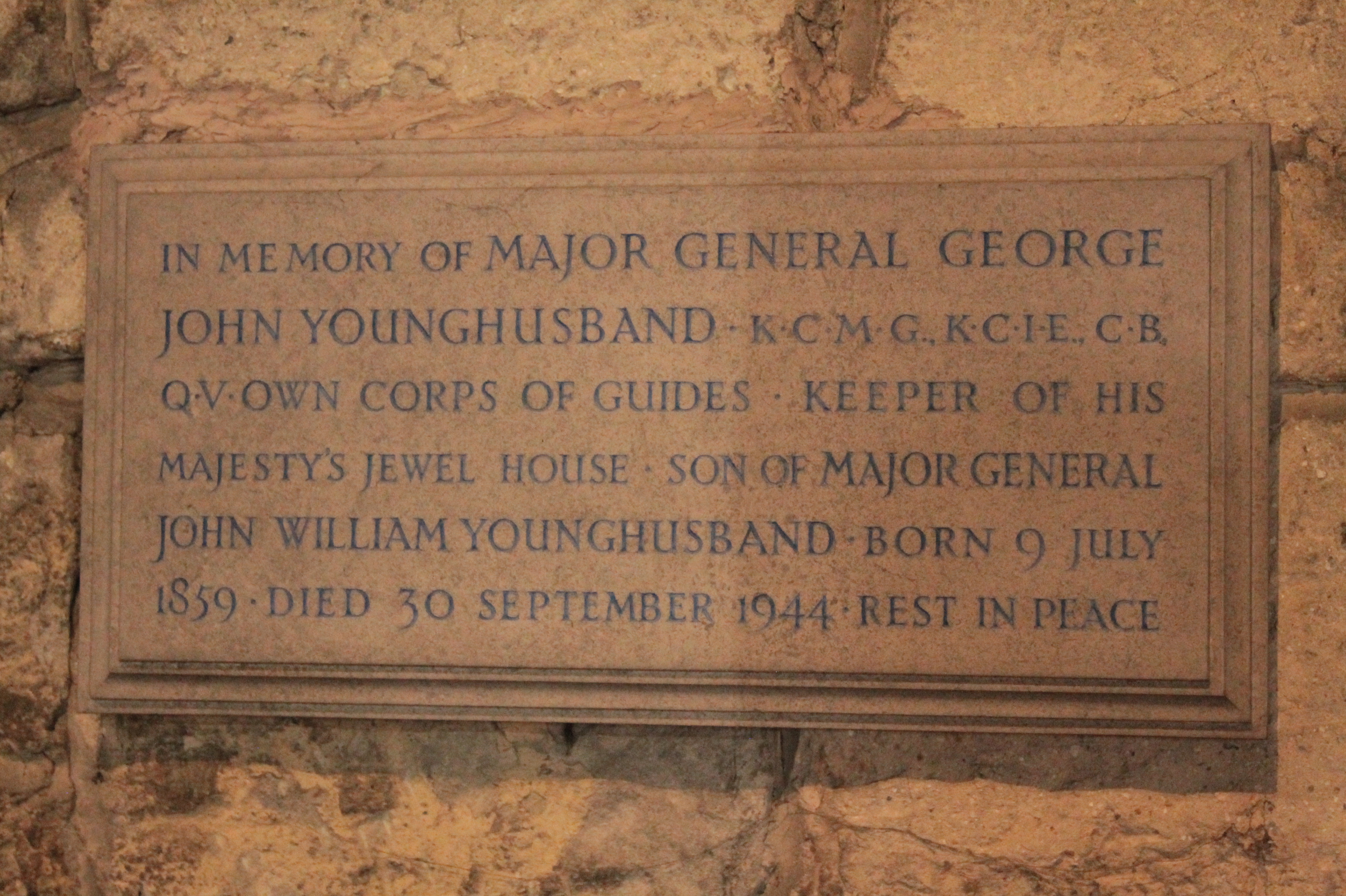
Memorial to George Younghusband, St Aidan's Church, Bamburgh

Younghusband's first command came during the Second Boer War, when he was promoted to temporary lieutenant-colonel and commanding officer of the 3rd Battalion, Imperial Yeomanry, on 20 January 1900. The battalion comprised the 9th (Yorkshire (Doncaster)), 10th (Sherwood Rangers), 11th (Yorkshire Dragoons) and 12th (South Nottinghamshire Hussars) Companies, all recruited by Yeomanry regiments in Yorkshire and Nottinghamshire. He left Liverpool with the battalion aboard Winifredian in late January 1900, arriving in South Africa the following month. While commanding the battalion he was mentioned in dispatches in 1901. The same year he received a brevet promotion to lieutenant-colonel and was appointed a Companion of the Order of the Bath (CB).

Younghusband left the 3rd to command the 26th (Younghusband's Horse) Battalion, Imperial Yeomanry, in December 1901. This battalion comprised the newly-raised 119th–122nd Companies. He was again mentioned in dispatches in June the following year. He was wounded, and in late May 1902 left South Africa on the SS Roslin Castle which arrived at Southampton the following month. He relinquished the command of the 26th battalion on 30 August 1902.

After that war he was promoted to colonel in April 1905. He was then involved in the Mohmand expedition of 1908. Then in February 1909, was promoted to temporary brigadier-general while serving on the General Staff. In 1909, he became commander of the Fyzabad Brigade, part of the 8th (Lucknow) Division, and the Derajat Brigade from 1911. The same year he was promoted to major-general. He was still in command, when appointed a Knight Commander of the Order of St Michael and St George (KCMG) in 1913.

In October 1914, Younghusband was given command of the 28th Indian Brigade, part of the 10th Indian Division. They were initially deployed to defend the Suez Canal. In July 1915, the brigade was detached to defence of Aden. where it fought a sharp action at Sheikh Othman on 20 July, before returning to Egypt in September.

In November 1915, the brigade left the division and moved to Mesopotamia to form part of the 7th (Meerut) Division from December 1915. At this point Younghusband left the brigade and was appointed to command the 7th (Meerut) Division on 10 December 1915 but he was forced to relinquish that position on 8 May 1916 due to wounds received.

During the operations in Mesopotamia Younghusband was again mentioned in dispatches.

== Family and later life ==
In March 1917, King George V appointed Younghusband as the Keeper of the Jewel House at the Tower of London. Then in April 1919, the King approved his retirement from the army. He was not entirely finished with the army however and in January 1928, he was appointed the Regimental Colonel of the 10th Queen Victoria's Own Corps of Guides Cavalry (Frontier Force) and of the 5th Battalion, (Queen Victoria's Own Corps of Guides) 12th Frontier Force Regiment.

His son Brigadier George Edward Younghusband, of the 3rd The King's Own Hussars, served with the 2nd Armoured Division during the Second World War.

George John Younghusband died on 30 September 1944, aged eighty-five, at Crickhowell in Wales.

== Notable works ==
- The Crown Jewels of England (1919)
- On short leave to Japan (1894)
- Eighteen Hundred Miles on a Burmese Pony
- Forty Years a Soldier (1923)
- Indian Frontier Warfare (1898)
- The Jewel House (1920)
- A Short History of the Tower of London (1926)
- The Philippines and Round About, with some Account of British Interests in these Waters
- Polo in India
- The Queen's Commission
- The Relief of Chitral (1895)
- A Soldier's Memories in Peace and War (1917)
- The Story of the Guides (1908)
- The Tower from Within (1918)
- Exploits of Asaf Khan (introduction)
