= Robert Scallon =

British general (1857–1939)

Lieutenant-General Sir Robert Scallon GCB KCIE DSO
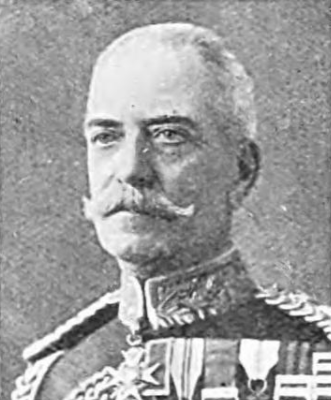
- Born: 3 April 1857; Long Ditton, Surrey, England
- Died: 1 May 1939 (aged 82); Worcester, Worcestershire, England
- Military career
- Allegiance: United Kingdom
- Branch: Indian Army
- Rank: Lieutenant-General
- Commands: 23rd Bombay Rifles; 3rd Indian Brigade; British troops in Aden; Bangalore Brigade; Burma Division; 8th (Lucknow) Division; Northern Army, India; Southern Army, India
- Conflicts: Second Anglo-Afghan War; Burma Campaign (1886); North-West Frontier; Tirah Campaign; World War I
- Awards: Knight Grand Cross of the Order of the Bath; Knight Commander of the Order of the Indian Empire; Distinguished Service Order

Lieutenant-General Sir Robert Irvin Scallon GCB KCIE DSO (3 April 1857 – 1 May 1939) was a British officer in the Indian Army.

== Military career ==
Scallon was commissioned into the British Army in 1876 and joined the 72nd Highlanders in 1877. He transferred to the Bombay Staff Corps in 1877 and took part in the Battle of Kandahar in 1880 during the Second Anglo-Afghan War. He became adjutant of the 23rd Bombay Light Infantry in 1881 and took part in the Burma Campaign in 1886. He became Deputy Assistant Adjutant General at Poona in 1891, Deputy Assistant Adjutant General at Bombay in 1895 and Inspector General of the Imperial Service Troops in 1897.

Scallon took part in the Tirah Campaign in 1897 and became Commanding Officer of the 23rd Bombay Rifles in 1898. He commanded the Zhob Section of Blockading Force for the Mahsud Waziri expedition in 1900. He was promoted to lieutenant-colonel on 12 February 1902, and went on to command troops in the Zhob District during disturbances in 1902, for which he received the brevet rank of colonel on 5 June 1902. The following year he was in command of troops during operations in the Aden Hinterland in 1903. He was appointed Commander of 3rd Indian Brigade in India in 1904, General Officer Commanding Aden in 1905 and Commander of the Bangalore Brigade in 1906. He was promoted to major general in December 1906.

Scallon became Adjutant-General, India in 1908, Secretary to Government of India, Army Department in 1909 and General Officer Commanding Burma Division in 1911, the same year he was promoted to lieutenant general, before becoming General Officer Commanding 8th (Lucknow) Division in 1913. He served in World War I as General Officer Commanding-in-Chief of the Northern Army in India in 1914 and then as General Officer Commanding-in-Chief Southern Army in 1915 before retiring in 1919.

In retirement Scallon worked in high positions in the Boy Scouts and the Red Cross.

Military offices
Preceded by Alfred Martin	Adjutant-General, India; 1908−1909	Succeeded by Sir Arthur Barrett
Preceded by Sir James Willcocks	GOC-in-C, Northern Army, India; 1914−1915	Succeeded by Sir John Nixon
Preceded by Sir John Nixon	GOC-in-C, Southern Army, India; 1915−1916	Succeeded by Sir Charles Anderson
