= Charles Anderson (British Army officer) =

British Army general

Lieutenant-General Sir Charles Anderson KCB KCIE AM
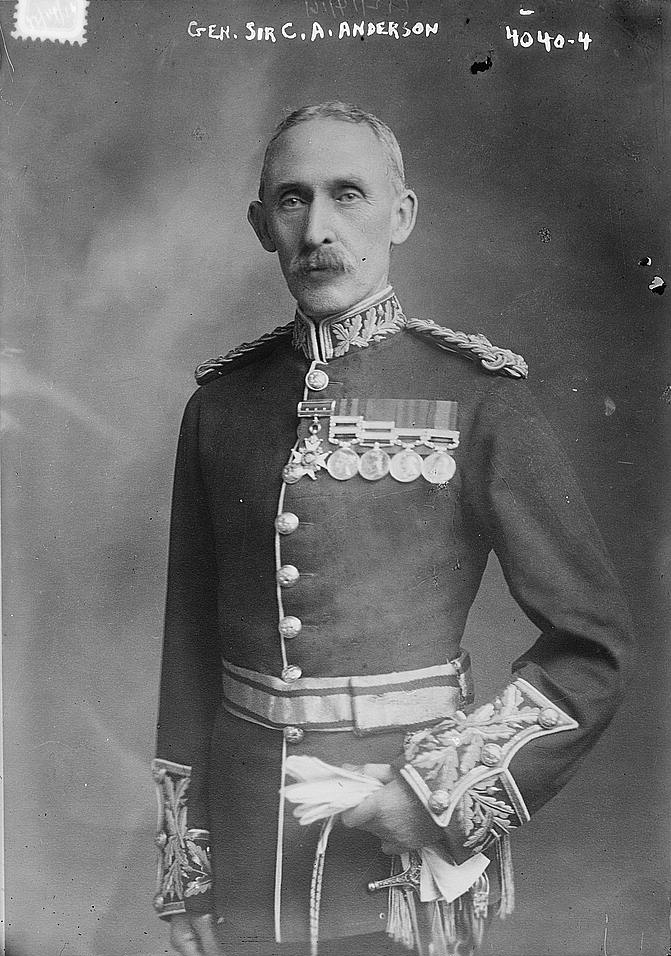
- Anderson in 1916
- Born: 10 February 1857
- Died: 20 February 1940 (aged 83); Ivybridge, Devon
- Military career
- Allegiance: United Kingdom
- Branch: British Army
- Service years: 1876–1920
- Rank: Lieutenant-General
- Commands: Southern Army, India; Commander of British Troops in South China; Mohmand Field Force; 1st Brigade
- Conflicts: Jowaki Expedition; Second Anglo-Afghan War; Third Anglo-Burmese War; North-West Frontier; First World War
- Awards: Knight Commander of the Order of the Bath; Knight Commander of the Order of the Indian Empire; Albert Medal; Grand Cordon of the Order of the Sacred Treasure (Japan)

Lieutenant-General Sir Charles Alexander Anderson, KCB, KCIE, AM (10 February 1857 – 20 February 1940) was Commander of British Troops in South China.

== Military career ==
Anderson was commissioned into the Royal Horse Artillery in 1876.

He took part in the Jowaki-Afridi expedition 1877, the Second Anglo-Afghan War in 1878 and the Burma expedition in 1885. He went to the North West Frontier in India in 1897. After the outbreak of the Second Boer War saw several senior officers posted to South Africa, Anderson was on 3 March 1900 temporary appointed assistant adjutant-general at head quarters Punjab Command. He was appointed assistant adjutant-general at Mandalay in June 1900, while still officiating in the Punjab, but never actually took up this position as he was appointed permanently to the job at Punjab head quarters on 20 May 1901, while also promoted to the substantive rank of colonel.

He was awarded the Albert Medal for an event at Ferozepore on 30 August 1906 when a fire broke out in one of the Magazines of the Ferozepore Arsenal. The citation reads:

Major-General Anderson, who directed the subsequent operations from the roof at the edge of the Magazine Compound, at a distance of some 20 yards, having ordered all persons to be cleared out of the fort, and placed a cordon round it at 1,000 yards distance, a steam fire engine was got to work, and the fire party which had been organised commenced their highly dangerous task of clearing cell No. 8 in which was stored some 19,000 lbs of gunpowder; they eventually succeeded in so doing, thereby cutting off the fire by the intervention of an empty cell. Had the powder in this cell exploded, the explosion must have been communicated to cells in an adjoining magazine, where 300,000 lbs of gunpowder were stored.

He was appointed commander of 1st Brigade for the Bazaar Valley expedition in 1908, and went on to be commander of the Mohmand Field Force later that year. He was appointed Commander of British Troops in South China in 1910.

He was promoted to lieutenant general on 12 May 1914, while in command of a division.

He served in the First World War as general officer commanding the Southern Army in India from 1917. He retired in 1920.

In 1921, he was conferred the Grand Cordon of the Order of the Sacred Treasure by the emperor of Japan.

== Family ==
In 1893 he married Ellen Katherine Russell: they went on to have two sons.

Military offices
Preceded by Robert Broadwood	Commander of British Troops in South China; 1910–1913	Succeeded by Francis Kelly
Preceded by Sir Robert Scallon	GOC-in-C, Southern Army, India; 1917–1919	Succeeded by Sir William Marshall
