= 51st Sikhs (Frontier Force) =

Pakistan Army Unit

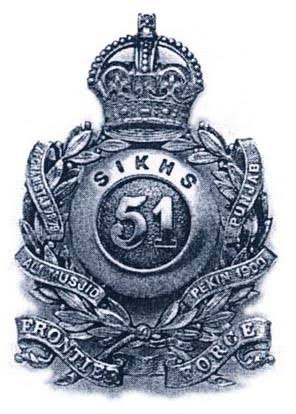
- Active: 1846 – till date
- Country: British India; Pakistan
- Branch: British Indian Army; Pakistan Army
- Type: Infantry
- Nickname: Prince of Wales's Own
- Motto: Ekwanja
- Uniform: Drab; faced yellow
- March: God Bless the Prince of Wales from 1922 Lilly Dale Nut Brown Maid
- Engagements: North West Frontier of India; Second Sikh War 1848–49; India Mutiny 1857–58; Second Afghan War 1878–80; Boxer Rebellion 1900; First World War 1914–18

Commanders
- Notable commanders: Field Marshal Sir Charles Henry Brownlow, GCB Gen Sir Rob Lockhart, KCB, CIE, MC

The 51st Sikhs (Frontier Force) was an infantry regiment of the British Indian Army. It was raised in 1846 as the 1st Regiment of Infantry The Frontier Brigade. It was designated as the 51st Sikhs (Frontier Force) in 1903 and became 1st Battalion (Prince of Wales's Own Sikhs) 12th Frontier Force Regiment in 1922. In 1947, it was allocated to the Pakistan Army, where it continues to exist as 3 Battalion The Frontier Force Regiment.

== Early history ==
The regiment was raised on 10 December 1846 at Hoshiarpur as the 1st Regiment of Infantry The Frontier Brigade by Major JS Hodgson. It was composed of Sikhs, Punjabi Muslims, Pathans and Dogras, mostly recruited from the disbanded regiments of the Sikh Empire following the First Anglo-Sikh War. In 1847, it was designated 1st Regiment of Sikh Local Infantry, becoming the 1st Regiment of Sikh Infantry in 1857. In 1851, the regiment became part of the Punjab Irregular Force, which later became famous as the Punjab Frontier Force or The Piffers. The Piffers consisted of five regiments of cavalry, eleven regiments of infantry and five batteries of artillery besides the Corps of Guides. Their mission was to maintain order on the Punjab Frontier; a task they performed with great aplomb. The 1st Sikh Infantry took part in numerous frontier operations besides the Second Sikh War of 1848–49 and the Great Indian Mutiny of 1857–58, when it fought in Rohilkhand and Oudh in North India. During the Second Afghan War of 1878–80, the regiment took part in the capture of Ali Masjid and the advance to Jalalabad. In 1900, it went to China to suppress the Boxer Rebellion.

== 51st Sikhs (Frontier Force) ==
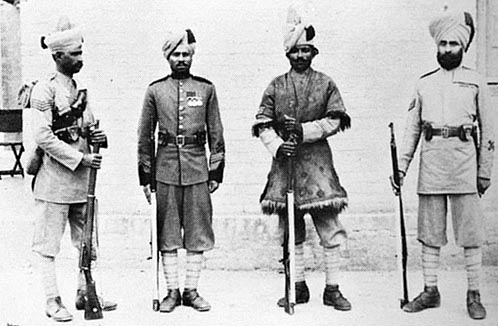
51st Sikhs (Frontier Force), 1905.

Subsequent to the reforms brought about in the Indian Army by Lord Kitchener in 1903, the regiment's designation was changed to 51st Sikhs (Frontier Force). In 1914, the regiment's class composition was four companies of Sikhs, two of Pathans, and one each of Punjabi Muslims and Dogras. During First World War the regiment remained part of the 28th Indian Brigade. In 1915, it served in Egypt and Aden (Yemen), moving to Mesopotamia in December. Here, it fought with great gallantry in the bloody battles for the Relief of Kut al Amara on the Tigris Front in 1916–17, the capture of Baghdad and in operations north of Baghdad at Istabulat, Daur and Tikrit. In 1918, the regiment moved to Palestine and took part in the Battle of Megiddo, which led to the annihilation of Turkish Army in Palestine. It returned to India in 1920. For their excellent performance in the war, in which they suffered heavy losses and were awarded a large number of gallantry awards, the 51st Sikhs were made Prince of Wales's Own in 1921. Next year, the regiment raised an all-Pathan Territorial Battalion at Nowshera. The 1st (Territorial) Battalion 51st (The Prince of Wales' Own) Sikhs (Frontier Force) would eventually go on to become 11th Battalion The Frontier Force Regiment in 1956.

== Subsequent history ==
After the First World War, the 51st Sikhs were grouped with the 52nd, 53rd and 54th Sikhs, and the two battalions of Guides Infantry to form the 12th Frontier Force Regiment in 1922. The 51st Sikhs became 1st Battalion (Prince of Wales's Own Sikhs) of the new regiment. During the Second World War, 1 FF saw active service in Iraq and Syria before moving in 1943 to Italy, where it again served with distinction. In 1947, the Frontier Force Regiment was allotted to Pakistan Army. In 1956, the Frontier Force Regiment, Frontier Force Rifles and the Pathan Regiment were merged into the Frontier Force Regiment, and 1 FF (Prince of Wales's Own) was redesignated as 3 FF. During the Indo-Pakistan War of 1965, the battalion fought in the Battle of Chawinda, while during the Indo-Pakistan War of 1971 it participated in the Battle of Chhamb in Kashmir.

== Genealogy ==
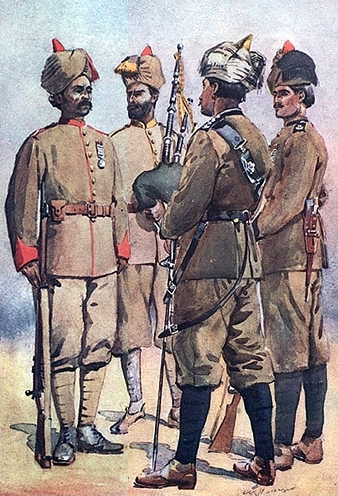
"Frontier Force". Left to right: 59th Scinde Rifles, Piper of 51st Sikhs and 56th Punjabi Rifles. Watercolour by Major AC Lovett, 1910.

- 1846 1st Regiment of Infantry The Frontier Brigade
- 1847 1st Regiment of Sikh Local Infantry
- 1857 1st Regiment of Sikh Infantry
- 1857 1st Regiment of Sikh Infantry, Punjab Irregular Force
- 1865 1st Regiment of Sikh Infantry, Punjab Frontier Force
- 1901 1st Sikh Infantry
- 1903 51st Sikhs (Frontier Force)
- 1921 51st The Prince of Wales's Own Sikhs (Frontier Force)
- 1922 1st Battalion (Prince of Wales's Own Sikhs) 12th Frontier Force Regiment
- 1945 1st Battalion (Prince of Wales's Own Sikhs) The Frontier Force Regiment
- 1947 1st Battalion (Prince of Wales's Own) The Frontier Force Regiment
- 1956 3rd Battalion The Frontier Force Regiment

== See also ==
- Frontier Force Regiment
- 12th Frontier Force Regiment
- Punjab Irregular Force
