= 53rd Sikhs (Frontier Force) =

- Active: 1846 – 1922
- Country: British India
- Branch: British Indian Army
- Type: Infantry
- Size: 1 Battalion
- Nickname: Renny ki Paltan
- Uniform: Drab; faced black
- Engagements: North West Frontier of India; Indian Mutiny 1857-59; Sikkim 1861; Second Afghan War 1878-80; First World War 1914-18

The 53rd Sikhs (Frontier Force) was an infantry regiment of the British Indian Army. It was raised in 1847 as the 3rd Regiment of Infantry The Frontier Brigade. It was designated as the 53rd Sikhs (Frontier Force) in 1903 and became 3rd Battalion (Sikhs) 12th Frontier Force Regiment in 1922. In 1947, it was allocated to the Pakistan Army, where it continues to exist as 5th Battalion The Frontier Force Regiment.

== Early history ==
The regiment was raised on 1 January 1847 at Ferozepur as the 3rd Regiment of Infantry The Frontier Brigade by Captain DF Winter. It was composed of Sikhs, Punjabi Muslims, Pathans, Dogras and Hindustanis. In 1847, it was designated 3rd Regiment of Sikh Local Infantry, becoming the 3rd Regiment of Sikh Infantry in 1857. In 1851, it became part of the Punjab Irregular Force, which later became famous as the Punjab Frontier Force or The Piffers. The Piffers consisted of five regiments of cavalry, eleven regiments of infantry and five batteries of artillery besides the Corps of Guides. Their mission was to maintain order on the Punjab Frontier; a task they performed with great aplomb. On the outbreak of the Indian Mutiny in 1857, the Hindustani Company was disbanded. In 1858 the 3rd Sikh Infantry took part in mopping up operations in North India. During the Second Afghan War of 1878–80, the regiment took part in the defence of Sherpur Cantonment and the Battle of Kandahar, while in 1897, it served in the Tirah Campaign.

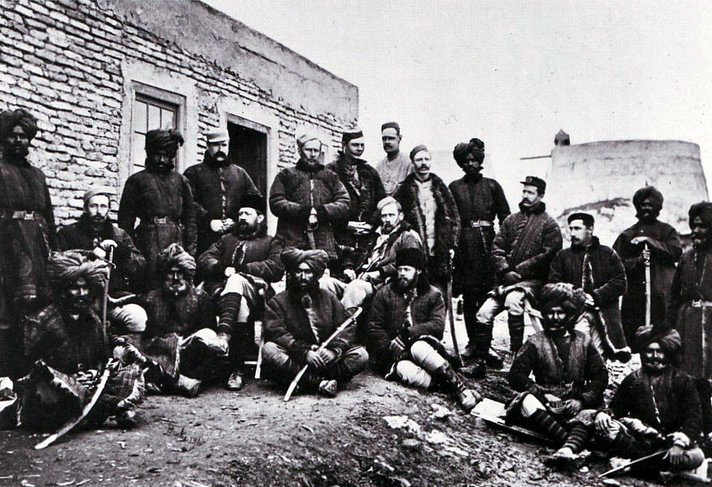
3rd Sikh Infantry at Kabul, 1879.

== 53rd Sikhs (Frontier Force) ==
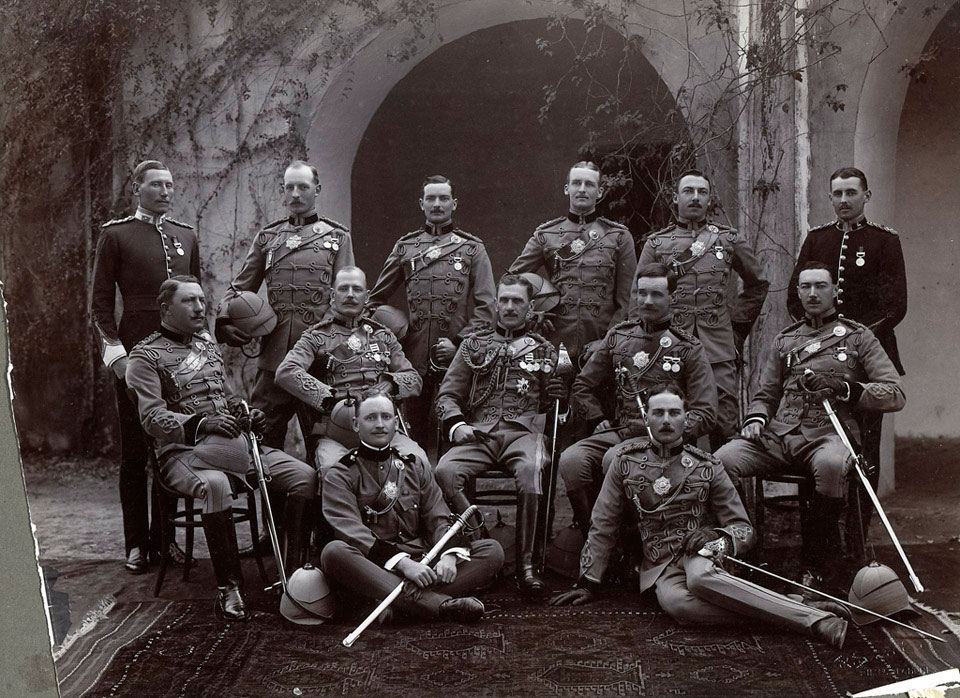
Seated in the centre, wearing his VC, is Lieutenant Colonel Charles Melliss, CO of the 53rd Sikhs (Frontier Force), and a group of officers, pictured here in India, sometime in 1910.

Subsequent to the reforms brought about in the Indian Army by Lord Kitchener in 1903, the regiment's designation was changed to 53rd Sikhs (Frontier Force). In 1914, the regiment's class composition was four companies of Sikhs, two of Pathans, and one each of Punjabi Muslims and Dogras.

During the First World War, which began in August 1914, the regiment served throughout with the 28th Indian Brigade. In 1915, it served in Egypt and Aden (Yemen), moving to Mesopotamia in December. Here, it fought with great gallantry in the bloody battles for the Relief of Kut al Amara on the Tigris Front in 1916–17, the capture of Baghdad and in operations north of Baghdad at Istabulat, Daur and Tikrit. In 1918, the regiment moved to Palestine and took part in the Battle of Megiddo, which led to the annihilation of the Turkish Army in Palestine.

It returned to India in 1920, by which time the war was over.

== Subsequent history ==
After the First World War, the 53rd Sikhs were grouped with the 51st, 52nd and 54th Sikhs, and the two battalions of Guides Infantry to form the 12th Frontier Force Regiment in 1922. The 53rd Sikhs became 3rd Battalion (Sikhs) of the new regiment. For their excellent performance during the First World War, they were made a 'Royal' battalion in 1935. During the Second World War, 3/12 FF served with great distinction in the Italian East Africa, Sicily, Italy and Greece. In 1947, the Frontier Force Regiment was allotted to the Pakistan Army. In 1948, 3/12 FF fought in the Kashmir War against India. In 1956, the Frontier Force Rifles and the Pathan Regiment were merged with the Frontier Force Regiment, and 3/12 FF was redesignated as 5 FF. During the Indo-Pakistan War of 1965, the battalion greatly distinguished itself in the Battle of Khem Karan, while during the Indo-Pakistan War of 1971 it served in Kashmir. The unit was awarded 5 Sitara-e-Jurrats and 4 Tamgha-e-Jurrats during its post-independence service

== Lineage ==
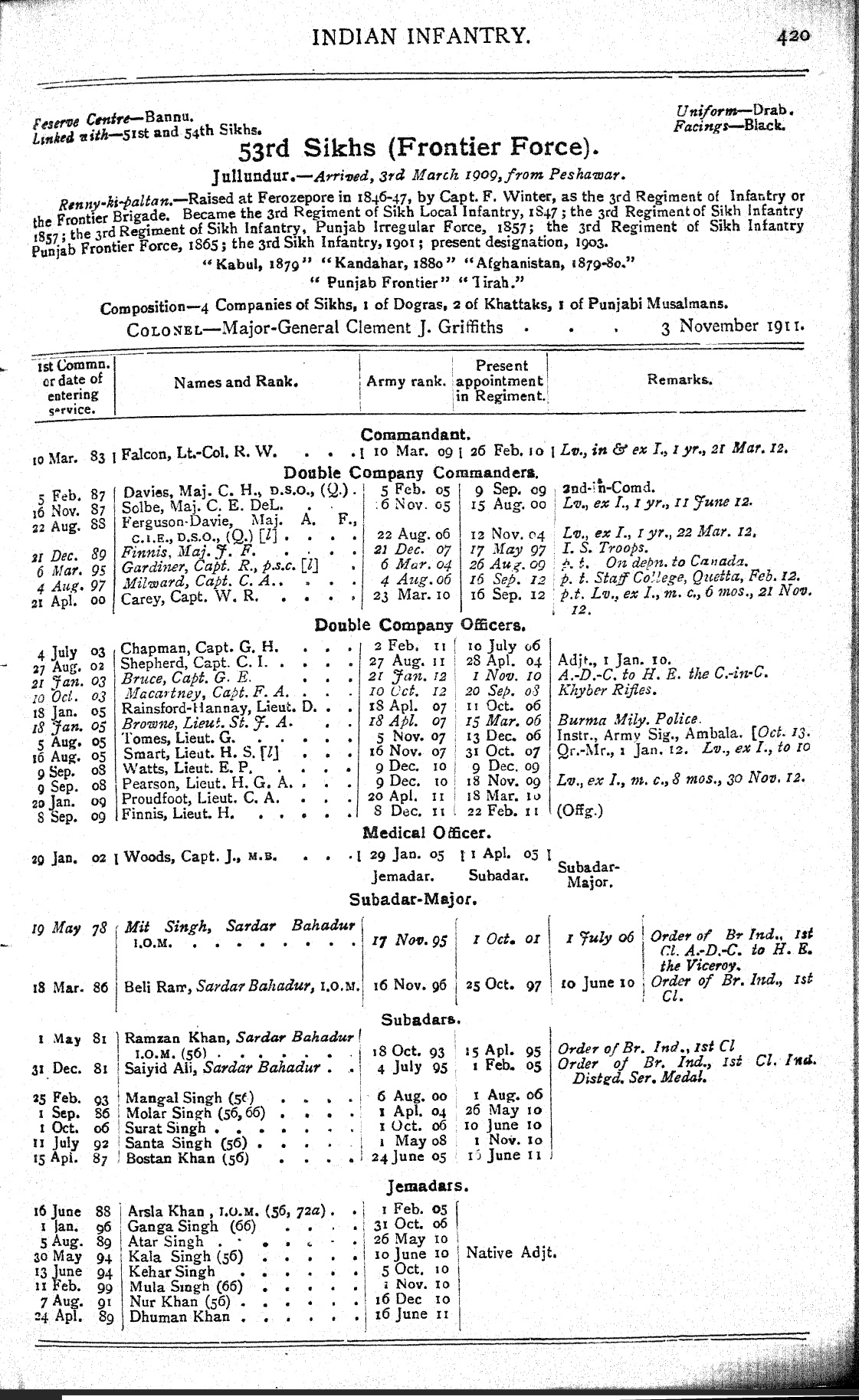
53rd Sikh 1913 list From the British Archives.

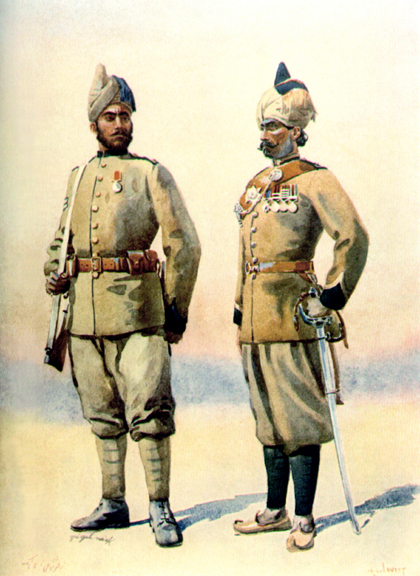
Naik, 57th Wilde's Rifles and Subedar, 53rd Sikhs (right). Watercolour by Major AC Lovett, 1910.

- 1846: 3rd Regiment of Infantry The Frontier Brigade
- 1847: 3rd Regiment of Sikh Local Infantry
- 1857: 3rd Regiment of Sikh Infantry
- 1857: 3rd Regiment of Sikh Infantry, Punjab Irregular Force
- 1865: 3rd Regiment of Sikh Infantry, Punjab Frontier Force
- 1901: 3rd Sikh Infantry
- 1903: 53rd Sikhs (Frontier Force)
- 1922: 3rd Battalion (Sikhs) 12th Frontier Force Regiment
- 1935: 3rd Royal Battalion (Sikhs) 12th Frontier Force Regiment
- 1945: 3rd Royal Battalion (Sikhs) The Frontier Force Regiment
- 1947: 3rd Royal Battalion The Frontier Force Regiment
- 1956: 5th Battalion The Frontier Force Regiment

== See also ==
- The Frontier Force Regiment
- 12th Frontier Force Regiment
- Punjab Irregular Force
