= List of battle and theatre honours of the Indian Army Corps of Engineers =

The Indian Army Corps of Engineers has distinguished itself in battle and has been awarded many battle and theatre honours. These honours have been awarded to individual units of the Corps or to the three Groups, namely the Madras Sappers, the Bengal Sappers and the Bombay Sappers. This list is a union of the battle and theatre honours awarded to these three groups of the Corps of Engineers and does not include those earned by disbanded engineer and pioneer units or corps.

== Prior to World War I ==
- Carnatic (1780 - 84)
- Carnatic (1790 - 92)
- Sholinghur (1781)
- Mysore (1789 - 91)
- Seringapatam (1799)
- Egypt 1801 (Battle honour)
- Assaye [1803]
- Bhurtpore [1805]
- Java [1811]
- Nagpore [1817]
- Meheidpoor [1817]
- Beni Boo Alli (1821)
- Ava [1824 - 26]
- Afghanistan 1839
- Ghuznee 1839
- Khelat [1839]
- China [1840 - 42]
- Cabool 1842
- Meanee [1843]
- Hyderabad 1843
- Ferozeshah [1845]
- Sobraon [1846]
- Punjaub [1848 - 49]
- Mooltan [1848 - 49]
- Goojerat [1849] (Battle honour)
- Pegu [1852 - 53]
- Persia [1856 - 57]
- Reshire [1856]
- Bushire [1856]
- Koosh - Ab [1856]
- Delhi 1857
- Relief and Capture of Lucknow [1857]
- Central India [1857]
- Pekin 1860
- Taku Forts [1860]
- Abyssinia (1867)
- Afghanistan 1878–80
- Ali Masjid [1878]
- Charasiah [1878]
- Kabul 1879
- Ahmad Khel [1880]
- Kandahar 1880
- Egypt 1882
- Tel-el-Kebir [1882]
- Suakin [1885]
- Tofrek [1885]
- Burma 1885–87
- Chitral 1895
- Malakand 1897
- Punjab Frontier [1897 - 98]
- Tirah [1897 - 98]
- China 1900
- Somaliland 1901-04
