= Qohaito =

Human settlement in Eritrea

- Koloe
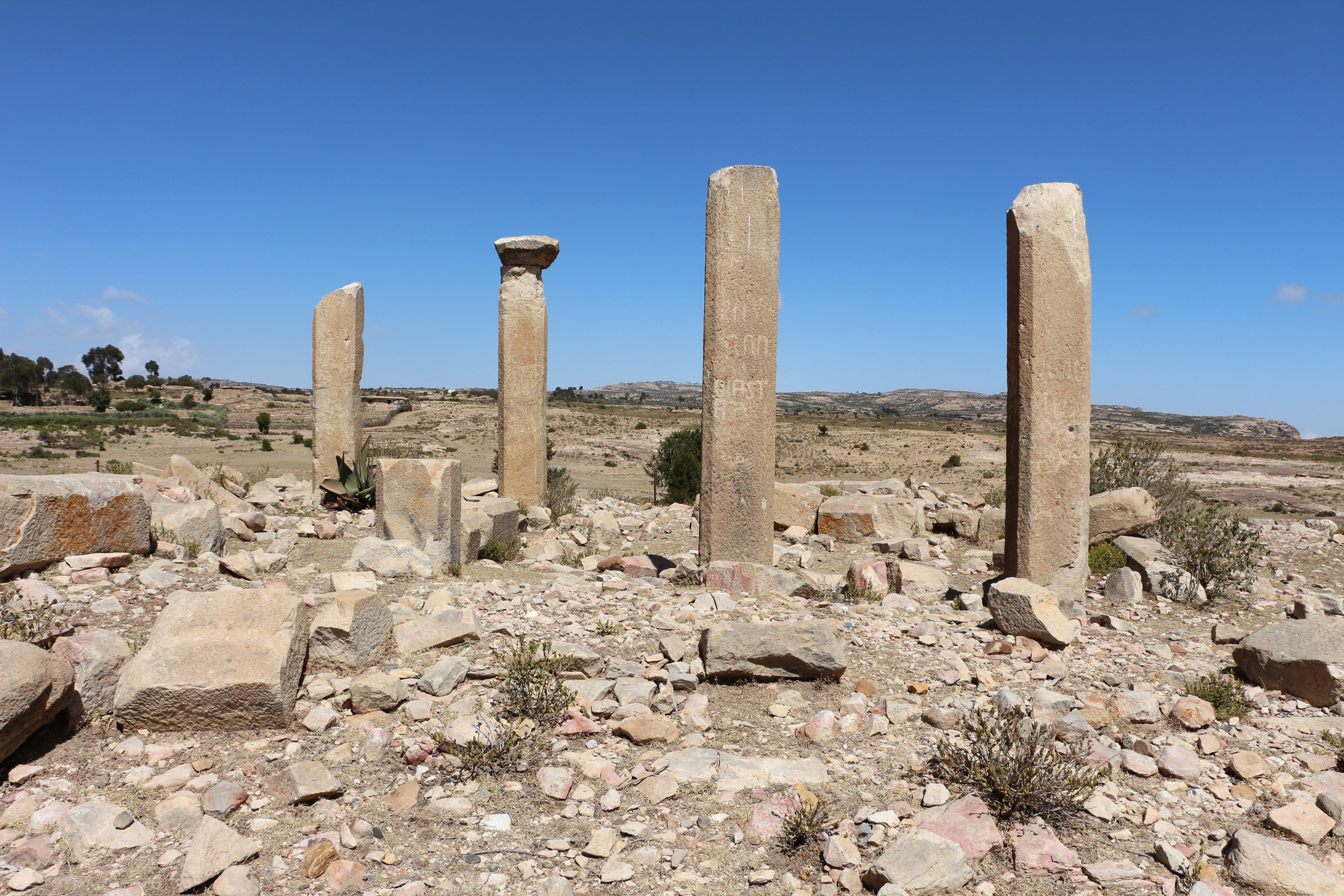
- The columns of a ruined structure at Qohaito

- Location within Eritrea
- 14°51′58″N 39°25′26″E
- Type: Settlement
- Location: Debub Region, Eritrea
- Region: Horn of Africa
- Part of: Punt, Dʿmt, Aksum

Qohaito (Tigrinya: ቆሓይቶ) or Koloe was a major ancient city in what is now the Debub region of Eritrea. It was a pre-Aksumite settlement that thrived during the Aksumite period. The city was located over 2,500 meters above sea level, on a high plateau at the edge of the Great Rift Valley, about half way between Aksum and its port of Adulis. As of 2011, Qohaito's stone ruins have yet to be excavated. The ancient port city of Adulis is directly to the north east, while Matara lies to the south.

In 2011, the site was submitted to the 'Tentative List of States Parties' of UNESCO World Heritage Sites.

== History ==
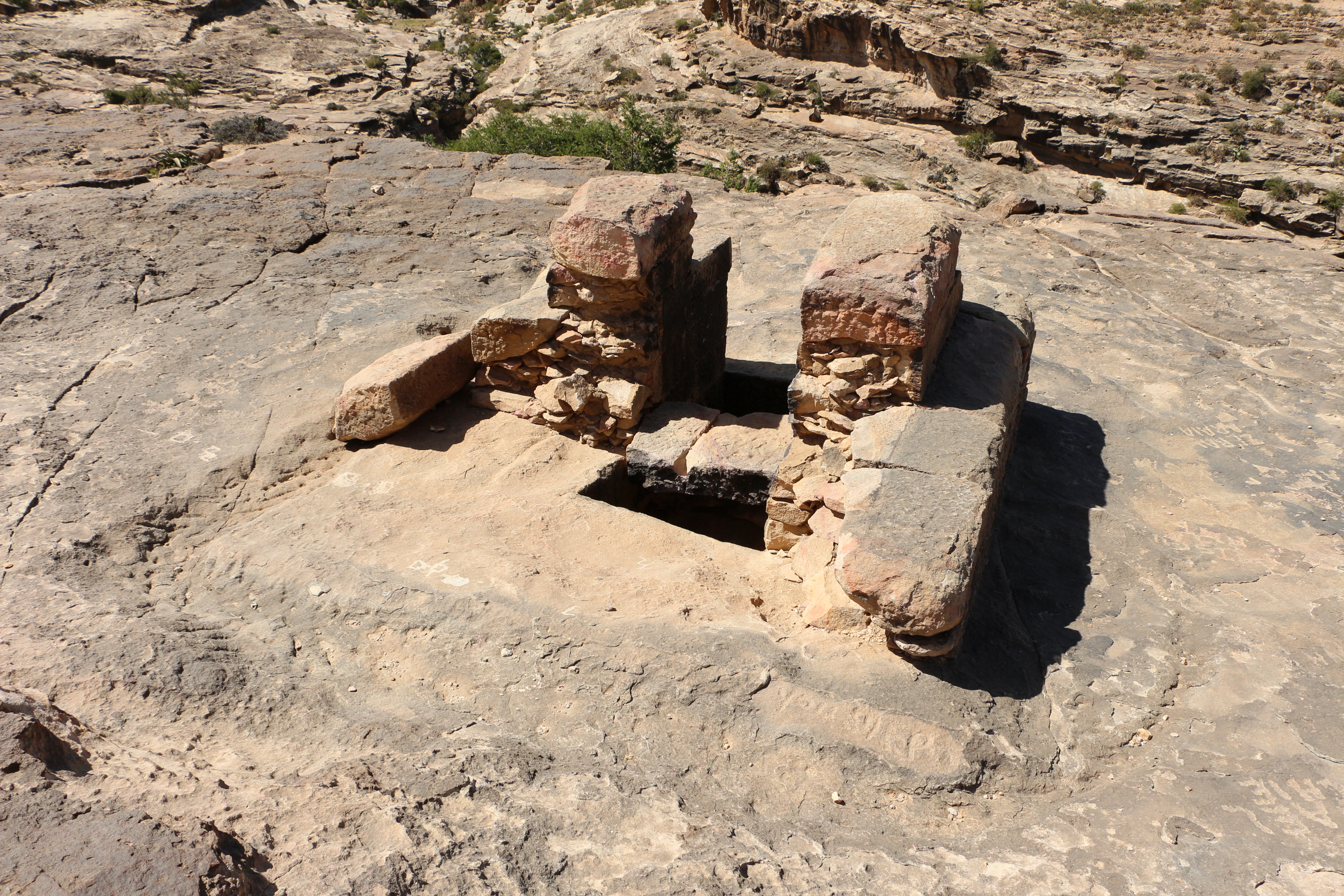
A tomb entrance on the Qohaito plateau (1965).

Rock art near Qohaito appears to indicate habitation in the area since the fifth millennium BC, while the town is known to have survived to the sixth century AD. Mount Emba Soira, Eritrea's highest mountain, lies near the site, as does a small successor village.

Qohaito is often identified as the town Koloe described in the Periplus of the Erythraean Sea, a Greco-Roman document dated to the end of the first century AD. The settlement thrived as a stop on the trade route between Adulis and Aksum. It is thought that crops were interspersed with buildings in the town. These old edifices included the pre-Christian Temple of Mariam Wakino and the Sahira Dam, which might also be pre-Aksumite.

The ruins at Qohaito were first located in 1868 by the British explorer Clements Markham. However, they were at the time erroneously identified as a "Greek deposit". Between 1996 and 1998 a team from the National Museum of Eritrea conducted an extensive survey and inventory of the site, in which they noted that some areas had been modified or damaged by inhabitants in recent decades. A related site outside of Senafe, Matara, lies about 15 kilometers to the south, and was excavated in the 1960s.

== Description ==
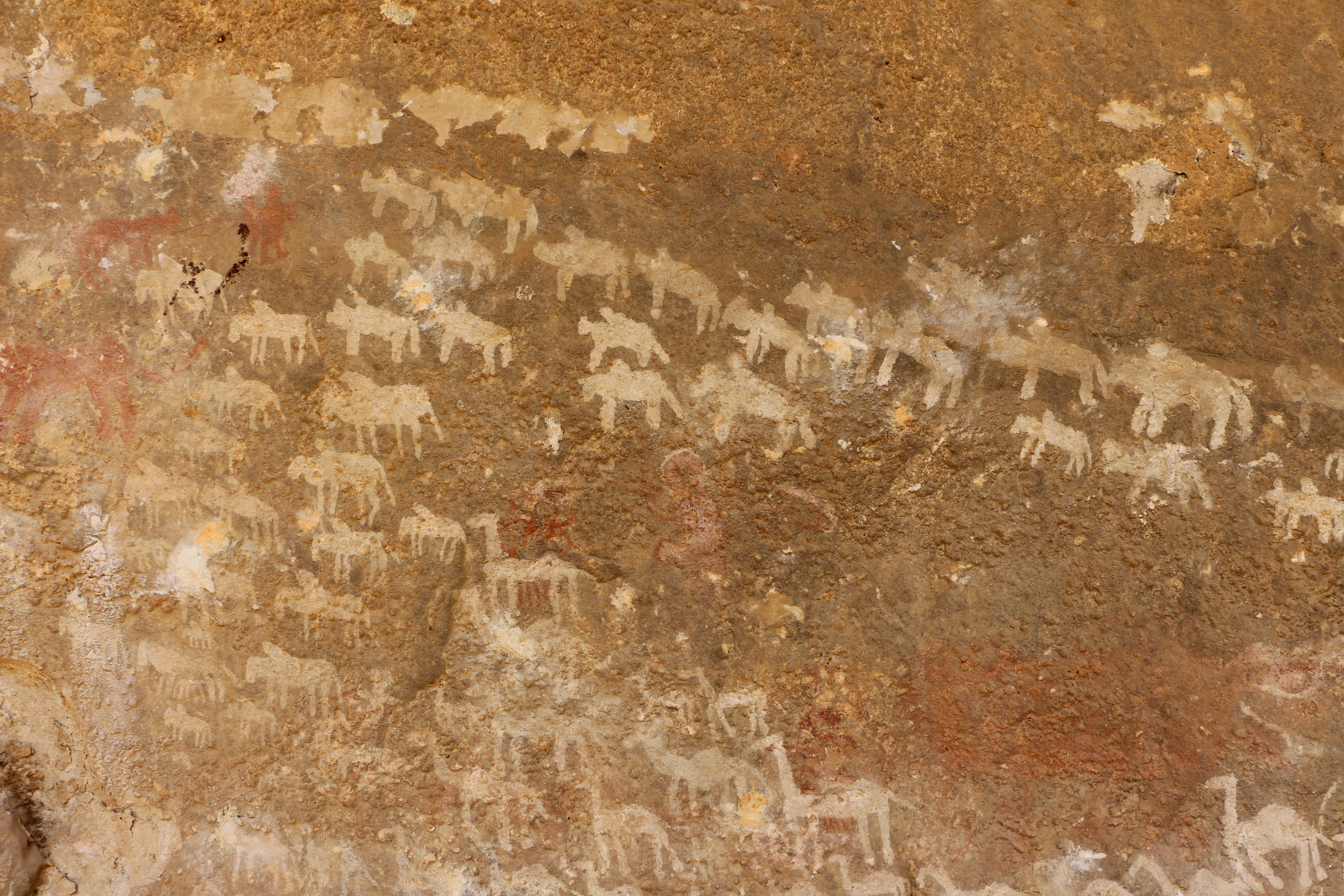
Rock art in the Adi Alauti cave

When coming from Adi Keyh, one first comes across Safra's Dam, a square basin with sides around 70 meters tall for the collection of water, attributed to ancient Semitic colonization. The lower southern side is blocked by a wall made of square stone blocks, with four protruding blocks serving as a staircase. On the eastern side there are the remains of a building which is 20 by 22 metres (perhaps a sanctuary), while on the north side there is another oval basin, of 55 by 25 meters, closed by an embankment.

Moving north, there are various ruins, and among those are three buildings. The first is a rectangular building with three pillars, with two of those still visible. The second building is named the Temple of Mariam Wakiro, which was most likely a church with a rectangular base of 14 by 25 metres, with three naves separated by two lines of six pillars. Around 100m further south is a pillar with its capital, and the rest of a third rectangular building. Immediately to the east of the clearing, the land plunges into a ravine, in which there are various tombs, containing rock paintings depicting camels and cows.

To the north-east of the valley, there are the ruins of a rectangular building (9.3 by 12 metres) with four pillars, one of which has fallen, surrounded by a courtyard. A little further north is another rectangular building with six pillars, known as Tomb of the Egyptian or Meqabir Ghibsi, a large Christian or Ottoman tomb.

== See also ==
- Adulis
- Keskese
- Matara
- Nakfa
- Sembel
- Zula
