= PCTC =

PCTC may refer to:

- Penn Central Transportation Company, an American Class I railroad that operated from 1968 to 1976
- Pioneer Corps Training Center, the training center of the Indian Army Pioneer Corps, located in Bangalore, India
- P_{CTC}, polynomial-time with access to closed timelike curves, a computational complexity class equal in power to PSPACE
- Pure Car and Truck Carrier, a type of roll-on/roll-off cargo ship designed to transport automobiles and trucks
