= Adulis =

Ancient city and port in Red Sea

- 𐩱 𐩵 𐩡 𐩪 ኣዱሊስ
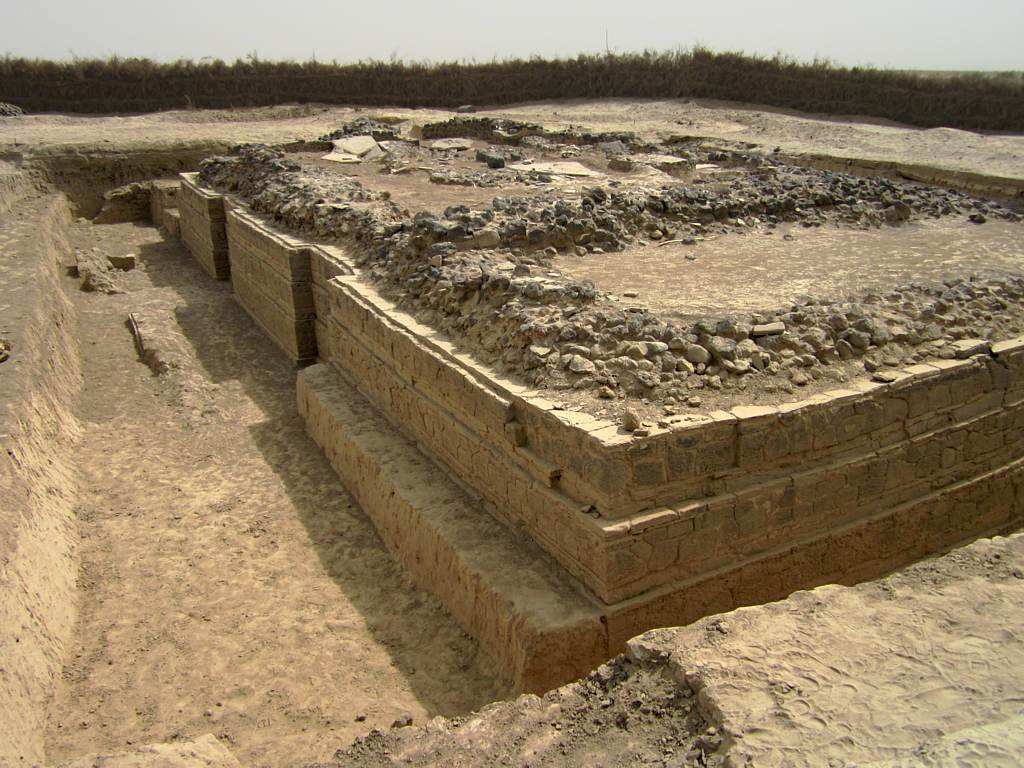
- A 5th-century Byzantine Christian basilica at Adulis, excavated in 1914

- Location within Eritrea Location within the Horn of Africa Location within Africa
- 15°15′49″N 39°39′38″E
- Location: Eritrea
- Region: Northern Red Sea

Site notes
- Length: 840 m (2,760 ft)
- Width: 430 m (1,410 ft)

Adulis (Sabaean: 𐩱 𐩵 𐩡 𐩪, Ge'ez: ኣዱሊስ, Ancient Greek: Ἄδουλις) was an ancient city along the Red Sea in the Gulf of Zula, about 40 kilometers (25 mi) south of Massawa. Its ruins lie within the modern Eritrean city of Zula. It was the emporium considered part of the D’mt and the Kingdom of Aksum. It was close to Greece and the Byzantine Empire, with its luxury goods and trade routes. Its location can be included in the area known to the ancient Egyptians as the Land of Punt, perhaps coinciding with the locality of Wddt, recorded in the geographical list of the Eighteenth Dynasty of Egypt.

== Etymology ==
Several theories have been proposed regarding the origin of the name Adulis. One theory derives the name from the Saho term ado lay, meaning "white water" or "clear water". The term is composed of ado ("white") and lay ("water") and is used by Saho speakers to describe settlements associated with reliable sources of clean water.

== History ==
Archeological excavations conducted at Adulis unearthed the existence of a late prehistoric settlement beneath the town, dating from the mid-2nd to early 1st millennium BCE. Adulis may correspond to Wddt, a region recorded in the geographical lists of Egypt’s 18th dynasty (ca. 1450 BCE) as part of the Land of Punt.

Pliny the Elder is the earliest European writer to mention Adulis (N.H. 6.34). He misunderstood the name of the place, thinking the toponym meant that it had been founded by escaped Egyptian slaves. Pliny further stated that it was the 'principal mart for the Troglodytae and the people of Aethiopia'. Adulis is also mentioned in the Periplus of the Erythraean Sea, a guide of the Red Sea and the Indian Ocean. The latter guide describes the settlement as an emporium for the ivory, hides, slaves and other exports of the interior. Roman merchants used the port in the second and third century AD.

It appears that the city was located some distance from its actual port—approximately 20 stades away—which sources refer to as "the harbour of the ʿAdulītā". Further evidence of this distinction can be seen in the fact that the ʿAdulītā are sometimes mentioned separately from the Aksumites. Epiphanius, when listing the nine kingdoms of the "Indians", distinguishes between the Aksumites and the "ʿAdulītā".

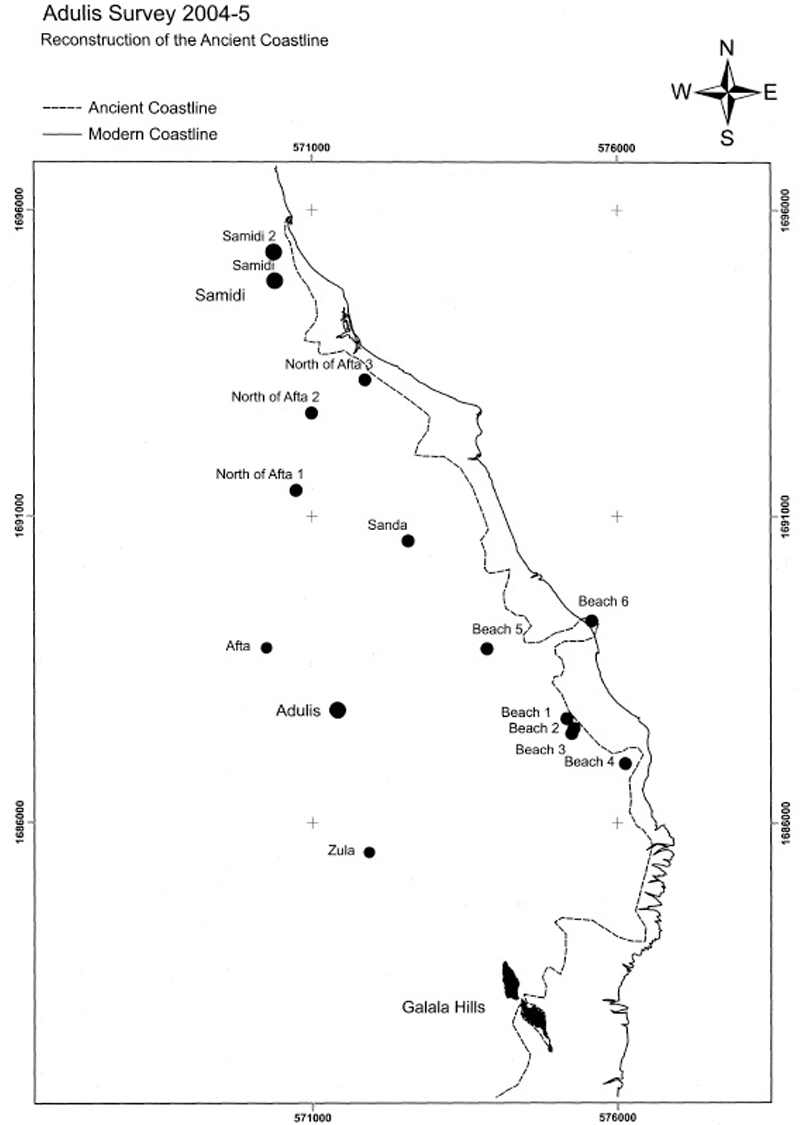
Map Of Adulis, Associated Towns & Sites In The Present Day & During Antiquity

In reality, the principal harbour where ships moored may have been located at a site known as Gabaza. The settlement is mentioned in the Martyrdom of Arethas (also known as the Martyrs of Najran), where it appears as a harbour associated with Adulis. Archaeologists have recently proposed that Gabaza was situated in the Galala Hills, south of Adulis, where the remains of two ancient circular watchtowers have been identified.

According to the Houhan Shu, Gan Ying visited 'Dou-le' which is believed to be Adulis in 97 AD, he returned with an embassy from Dou-le to Luoyang.

Cosmas Indicopleustes visited the town in 520 AD, when it was governed by a man named "Asbas" during the reign of King Kaleb of Axum, he recorded two inscriptions he found here in the 6th century: the first, probably the copy of another inscription at Alexandria, records how Ptolemy Euergetes (247–222 BC) used war elephants captured in the region to gain victories in his wars abroad; the second, known as the Monumentum Adulitanum, was inscribed in the 27th year of a king of Axum, perhaps named Sembrouthes, other scholars theorize him to be the Aksumite king GDRT, boasting of his victories in Arabia and northern Ethiopia.

On the Races of India and the Brahmans, a fourth century work traditionally ascribed to the writer Palladius of Galatia, relates the journey of an anonymous Egyptian lawyer (scholasticus) to India in order to investigate Brahmin philosophy. He was accompanied part of the way by one Moise or Moses, the Bishop of Adulis. The existence of the See of Adulis is also confirmed by the Notitiae Episcopatuum.

The last years of Adulis are a mystery. Yuri Kobishchanov detailed a number of raids Aksumites made on the Arabian coast (the latest being in 702, when the port of Jeddah was occupied), and argued that Adulis was later destroyed by the Muslims, which brought to an end Axum's naval power and contributed to the Aksumite Kingdom's isolation. It has traditionally been claimed that the town was destroyed in 640 AD by an Arab expedition; however, the evidence remains inconclusive. While excavations have revealed traces of fire, historical records indicate that the Arab expedition was ultimately considered a failure. Muslim writers occasionally mention the nearby Dahlak Archipelago as places of exile. In any case, the naval power of Axum waned and the port of Adulis was abandoned sometime around the 8th century AD.

== Archeological excavations ==
Adulis was one of the first Axumite sites to undergo excavation, when a French mission to Eritrea under Vignaud and Petit performed an initial survey in 1840, and prepared a map which marked the location of three structures they believed were temples. In 1868, workers attached to Napier's campaign against Tewodros II visited Adulis and exposed several buildings, including the foundations of a Byzantine-like church.

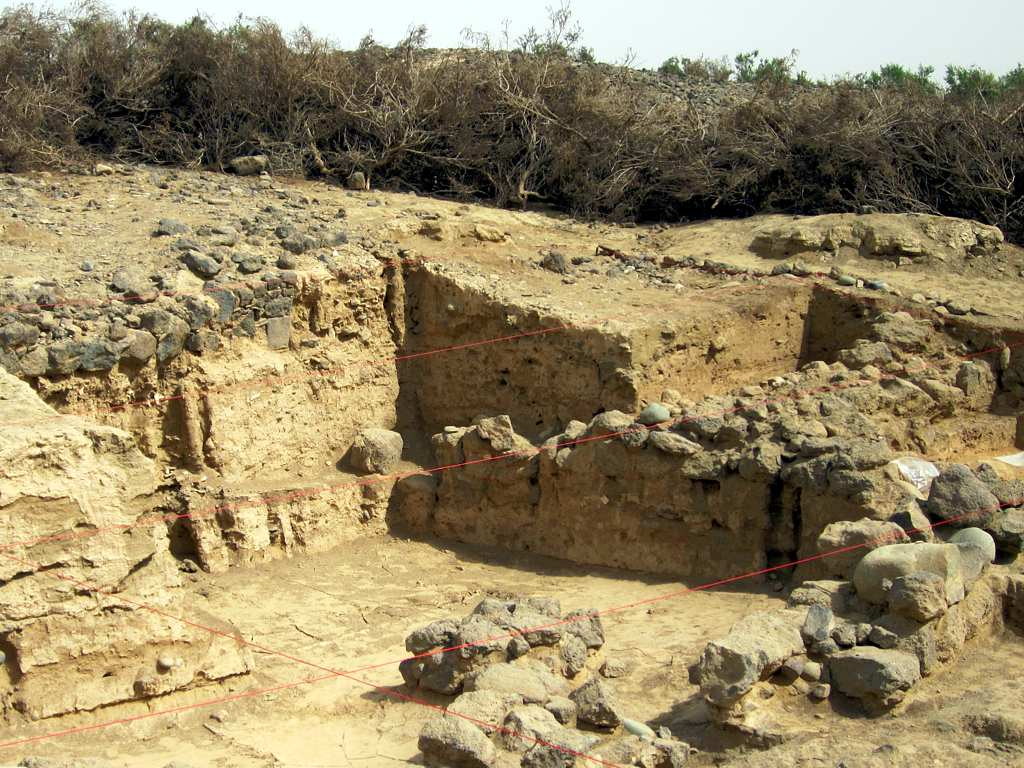
Archaeological excavations at Adulis, done by the Italian Roberto Paribeni in 1907

The first scientific excavations at Adulis were undertaken in 1906, under the supervision of Richard Sundström. Sundström worked in the northern sector of the site, exposing a large structure, which he dubbed the "palace of Adulis", as well as recovering some examples of Axumite coinage.

The Italian Roberto Paribeni excavated in Adulis the following year, discovering many structures similar to what Sundström had found earlier, as well as a number of ordinary dwellings. He found a lot of pottery: even wine amphorae imported from the area of modern Aqaba were found here during the decades of existence of the colony of Italian Eritrea. These types now called Ayla-Axum Amphoras have since been found at other sites in Eritrea including on Black Assarca Island.

Over 50 years passed until the next series of excavations, when in 1961 and 1962 the Ethiopian Institute of Archeology sponsored an expedition led by Francis Anfray. This excavation not only recovered materials showing a strong affinities with the late Axumite kingdom, but a destruction layer. This in turn prompted Kobishchanov to later argue that Adulis had been destroyed by an Arab raid in the mid-7th century, a view that has since been partially rejected.

A pair of fragments of glass vessels were found in the lowest layers at Adulis, which are similar to specimens from the 18th Dynasty of Egypt. One very specialised imported vessel discovered at the site was a Menas flask. It was stamped with a design showing the Egyptian St. Menas between two kneeling camels. Such vessels are supposed to have held water from a spring near the saint's tomb in Egypt (Paribeni 1907: 538, fig. 54), and this particular one may have been brought to Adulis by a pilgrim.

Since Eritrean Independence, the National Museum of Eritrea has petitioned the Government of Ethiopia to return artifacts of these excavations. To date they have been denied.

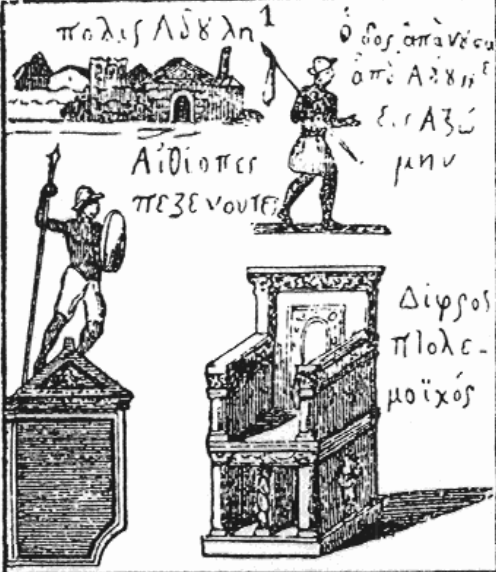
City of Adulis on the top left, and an "Aethiopian" travelling from Adulis to Aksum on the top right.

== See also ==
- Keskese
- Matara
- Nakfa
- Qohaito
- Sembel
