= Sembel =

Sembel, located in the capital of Asmara, Maekel Region of Eritrea, is an archaeological site dated back to as early as 800 BCE.

== Overview ==
Sembel was the site of a village near Asmara. It was subsequently made a suburb of the capital to its south. Immediately after the Eritrean War of Independence, a large government subsidized housing project was constructed in the area. During its construction and that of a nearby Intercontinental Hotel, evidence of ancient settlement was found. The National Museum of Eritrea later constructed a building to allow viewing of the excavation.

The excavations at Sembel found evidence of an ancient pre-Aksumite civilization in greater Asmara. This Ona urban culture is believed to have been among the earliest pastoral and agricultural communities in the Horn region. Artefacts at the site have been dated to between 800 BC and 400 BC, contemporaneous with other pre-Aksumite settlements in the Eritrean and Ethiopian highlands during the mid-first millennium BC. Additionally, the Ona culture may have had connections with the ancient Land of Punt. In a tomb in Thebes dated to the reign of Pharaoh Amenophis II (Amenhotep II), long-necked pots similar to those made by the Ona people are depicted as part of the cargo in a ship from Punt.

== See also ==
- Adulis
- Keskese
- Matara
- Nakfa
- Qohaito

== Notes ==
- Sembel - Ona culture

• Schmidt, Peter (2002). "Oldest Africa Settlement found in Eritrea" BBC website.
