= Nakfa =

Nakfa may refer to:

- the currency of Eritrea, see Eritrean nakfa
- a town in Eritrea, see Nakfa, Eritrea
- a district in Eritrea, see Nakfa District
