= Pioneer Corps =

Pioneer Corps may refer to:

- Indian Army Pioneer Corps
- Royal Pioneer Corps
- Pioneer movement, an organization for children operated by a communist party.
