= Matara, Eritrea =

Human settlement in Eritrea

Matara
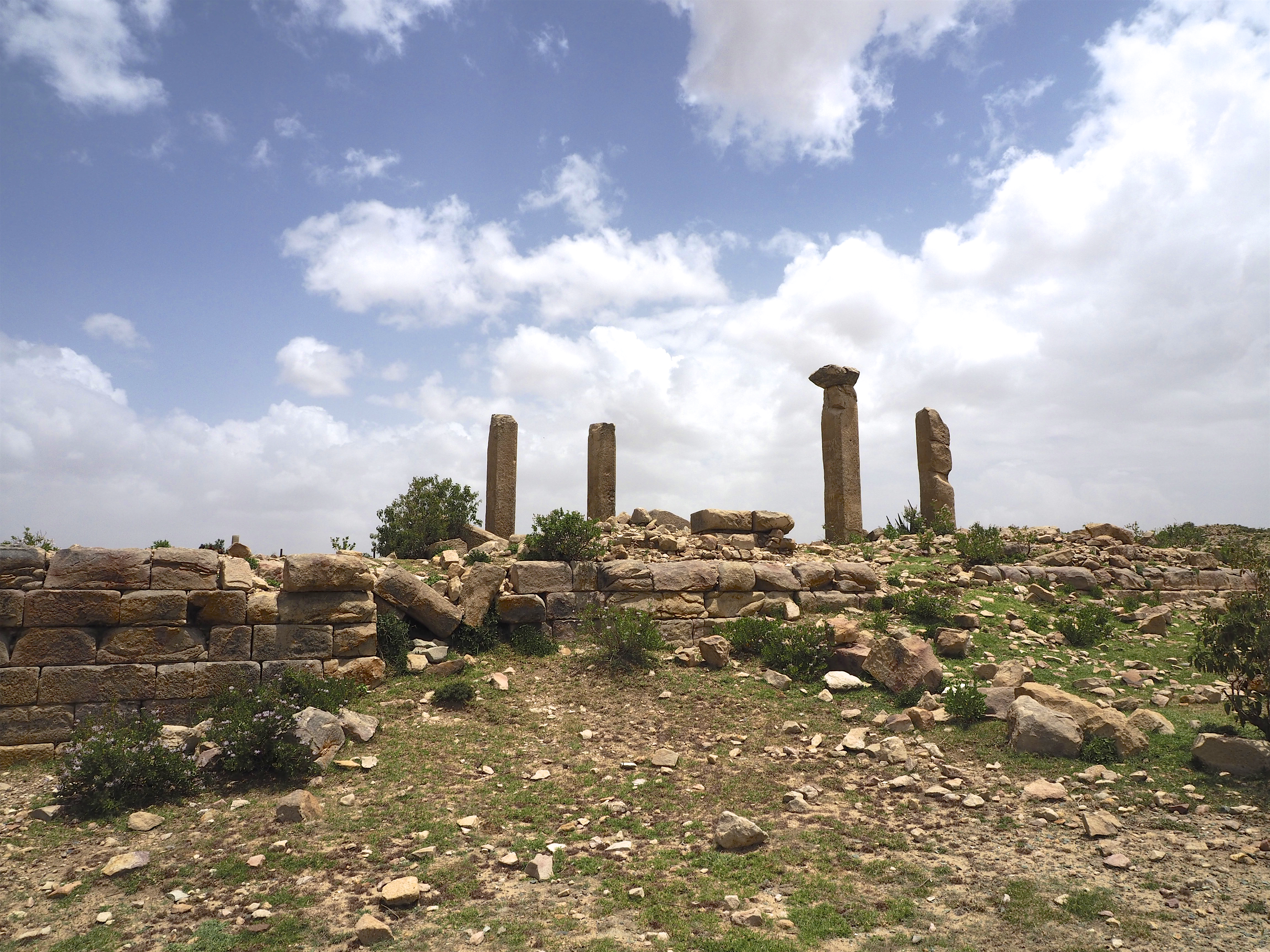
- Ruins in Matara Eritrea The archaeological site already has yielded evidence of several levels of habitation, including at least two different major cities, covering more than 1000 years. The topmost layers are associated with the Aksumite Empire and date from the fourth to the eighth centuries. This city was allied with or part of the powerful trading empire centered in the capital, Aksum, to the southwest

- Location within Eritrea
- 14.674722°N 39.424722°E
- Type: Settlement
- Location: Southern region, Eritrea
- Region: Horn of Africa
- Part of: Dʿmt, Aksum

History
- Built: Approximately fifth millennium BC

Metera (መጠራ, 𐩣𐩷𐩧), also known as Balaw Kalaw, is a small town and archaeological site located in the Southern region of Eritrea.

Situated a few kilometers south of Senafe (ሰንዓፈ), it was a major city in the Dʿmt (𐩵𐩲𐩣𐩩) and Aksumite kingdoms. The anicent town has the oldest example of Geʽez, which is a pre-Aksumite Obelisk, Hawulti (monument). Since Eritrean independence, the National Museum of Eritrea has petitioned the Ethiopian government to return artifacts removed from the site. However, the efforts have thus far been rebuffed.

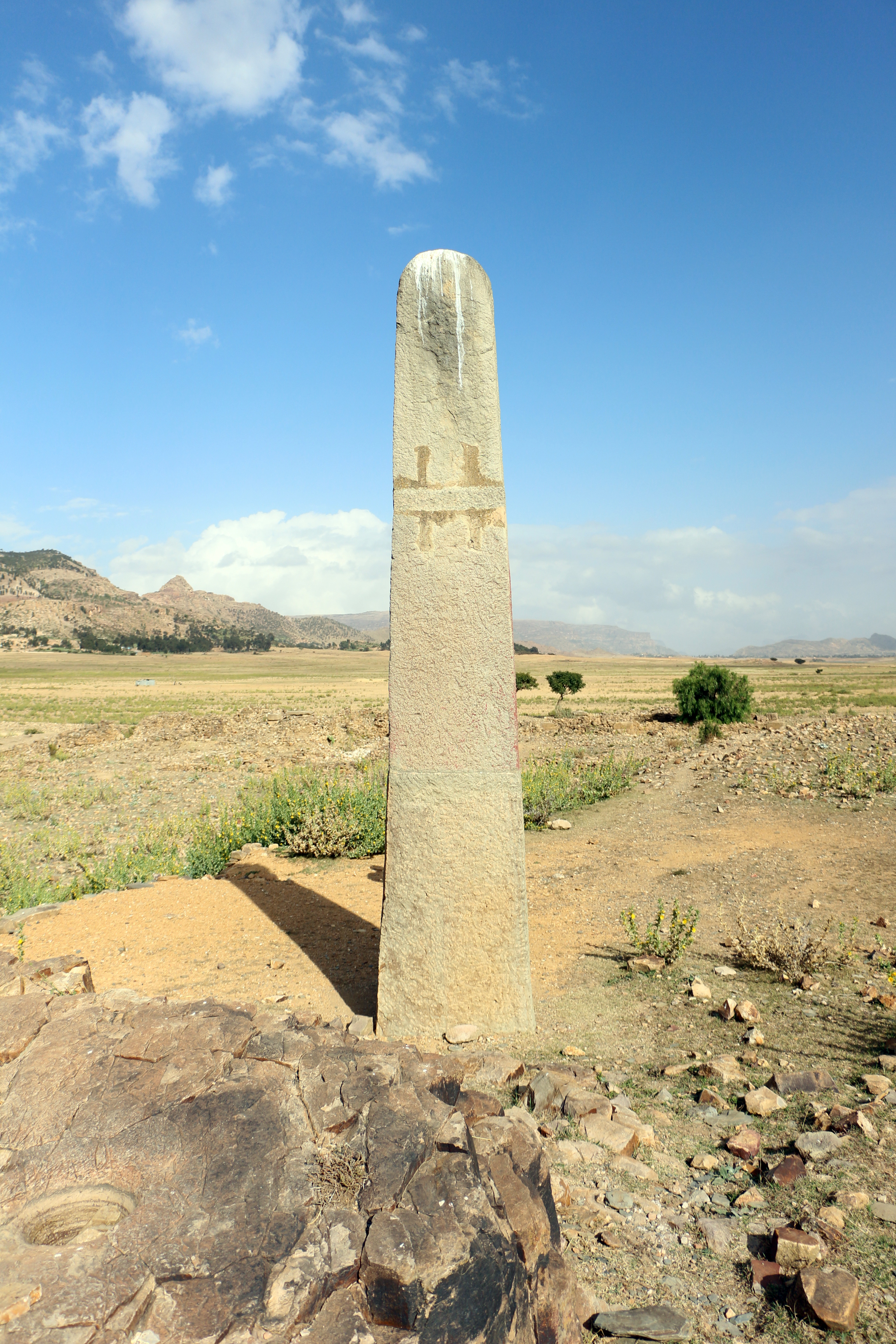
The Hawulti

== History ==
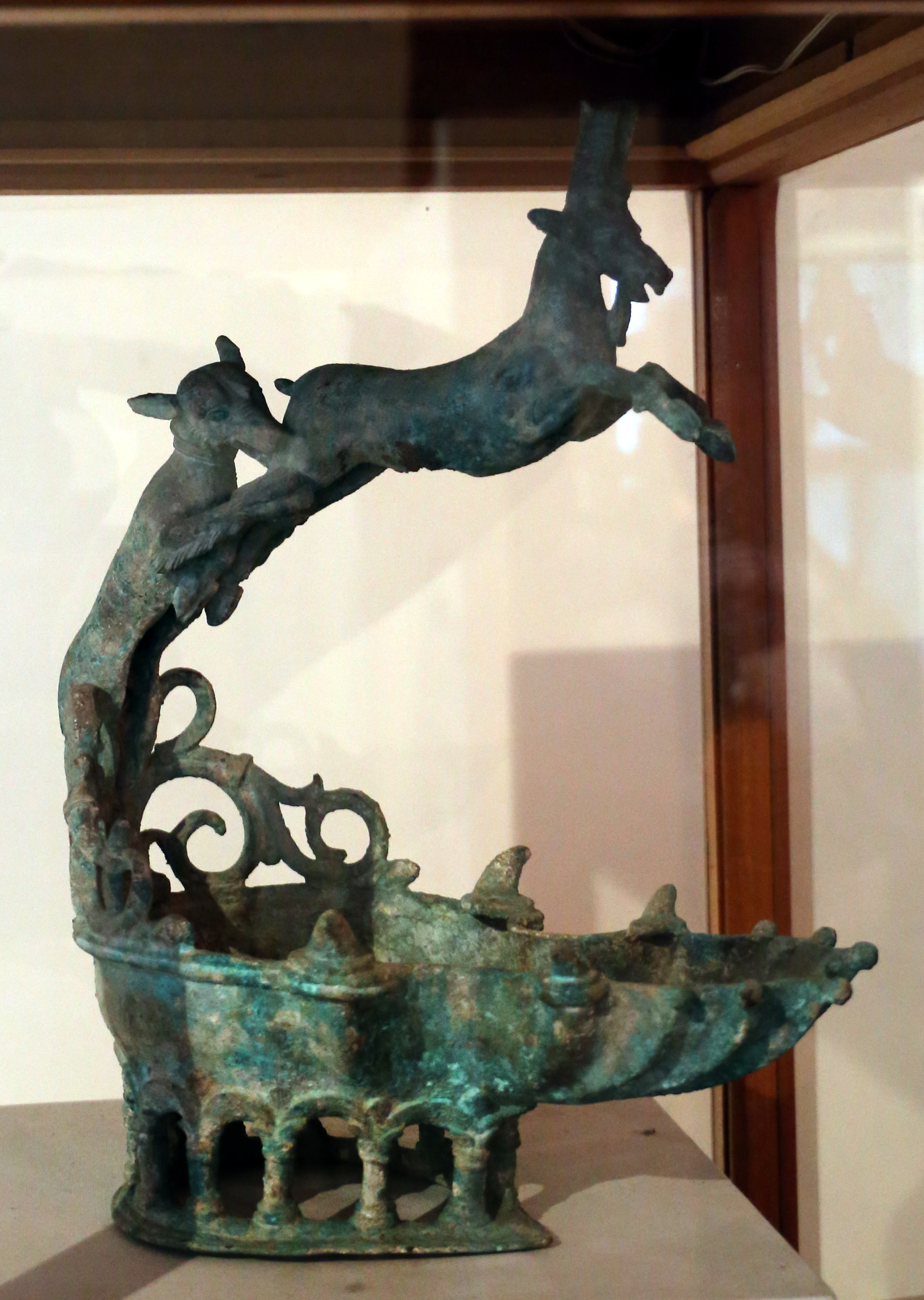
Bronze oil lamp excavated at Matara, dating from the D’MT Kingdom

Matara is the name of both a small village and an important archaeological site in Eritrea. The latter is located some 136 kilometers southeast of the capital Asmara, just past Senafe on the road leading south to the border with the northern Tigray Region of Ethiopia. The archaeological site already has yielded evidence of several levels of habitation, including at least two different major cities, covering more than 1,000 years. The topmost layers are associated with the Aksumite Empire and date from the fourth to the eighth centuries. This city was allied with or part of the powerful trading empire centered in the capital, Aksum, to the southwest. It appears that Matara was one of a string of cities along the trade route that ran from Aksum to its port city, Adulis, whose extensive ruins, surveyed but largely unexcavated, are in the vicinity of Zula, southeast of Massawa on the Red Sea coast. Keskese is located 8 kilometres (5.0 mi) north of Matara.

Hawulti, a pre-Aksumite or early Aksumite era obelisk, is situated here.

== See also ==
- Adulis
- Keskese
- Nakfa
- Qohaito
- Sembel
- Mendefera
