= Indian Army Pioneer Corps =

Operational logistics corps of the Indian Army

- Active: 1758 – Present
- Country: India
- Branch: Indian Army
- Role: Support, Logistics, Construction and Maintenance
- Size: 16 companies
- Mottos: Shram Sarva Vijayee (With Labour, everything can be won/ labor omnia vincit)
- Engagements: World War 1 World War 2 Basantar; Shamshernagar; Keran; Tithwal; Kargil; Mushkoh; Operation Vijay; Operation Deewar; OP Pawan; OP Parakram; Indo-Pak Wars
- Decorations: 3 Sena Medal 3 Kirti Chakra 6 Shaurya Chakra Presidential Colours

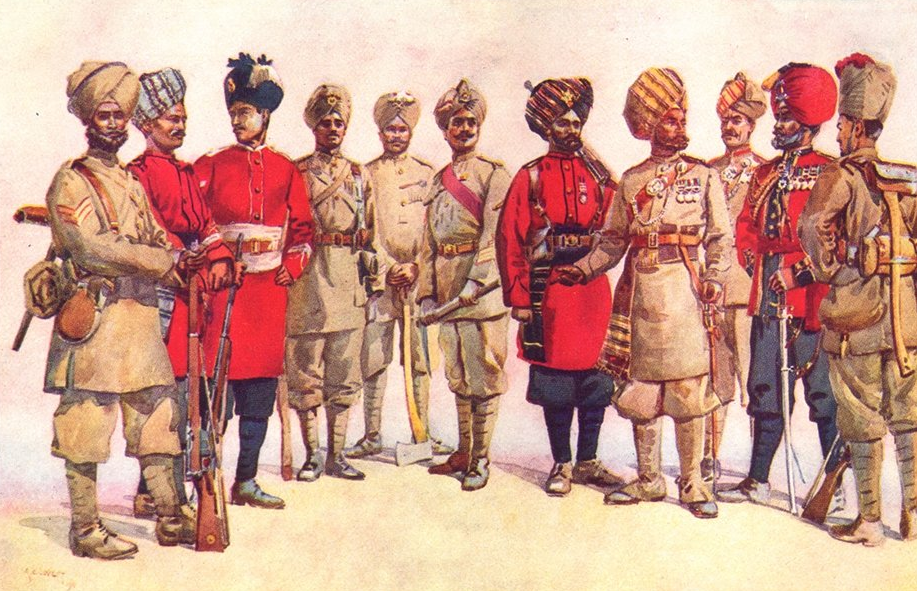
Pioneers of the British Indian Army. Left to right: 34th Sikh Pioneers, 12th Pioneers, 128th Pioneers, 81st Pioneers, 64th Pioneers, 61st King George's Own Pioneers, 48th Pioneers, 23rd Sikh Pioneers, 106th Hazara Pioneers, 34th Sikh Pioneers, 107th Pioneers (Water colour by AC Lovett in Armies of India, 1911)

The Indian Army Pioneer Corps or Pioneers is the operational logistics arm of the Indian Army. Though not a combat arm, the Pioneer Corps provide disciplined and well trained manpower where civilian labour is either not available or its employment is not desirable for reasons of security. Pioneer units are mostly committed in forward and operational areas. Although the Pioneer Corps were at one time the third largest troop in the Army and had a total of 26 Pioneer Companies even till 1999, today there are 21 Pioneer Units under various commands. The Pioneer Corps Training Center (PCTC) is currently located in Bangalore.

== Functions and roles ==
- Provide logistic support to the fighting forces - with the service corps it brings up vital supplies and stores, with the ordnance corps it keeps up the flow of guns and ammunition
- Loading and unloading of stores, rations, equipment and ammunition over land, sea, and air
- Detect and are involved in laying and breaching of landmines and minefields
- Construction, activation and maintenance of roads, mule tracks, border fences, bridges, airstrips, railways, aerodromes and helipads
- Works in hospitals or acts as stretcher bearers with frontline troops
- Opening and maintenance of Jawahar Tunnel, Zojila Pass, Sadhna & Tithwal Passes (J&K)
- Laying and breaching of mines and minefields
- Carrying back the body bags during ‘Operation Vijay’ in the higher reaches of Kargil, Drass and Mushkoh.
- Bringing back the wounded from recaptured entrenchments
- Expatriating prisoners of war

== History ==
Pre-Independence of India

The origin of the Indian Pioneer Corps dates back to 1758 when the first Pioneer Companies was formed, the Madras Pioneers, Bombay Pioneers, Sikh Pioneer and the Hazara Pioneers. After being disbanded for many years, the Pioneer Corps was re-raised during World War-II in the following to provide semi skilled labour to work with Engineer units or tasks such as demolition, construction of roads, tracks bridges, defences & water supply and to provide unskilled labour where required. By the wars end a total of approximately 300,000 such workers had been engaged of which 21,000 were Indians.

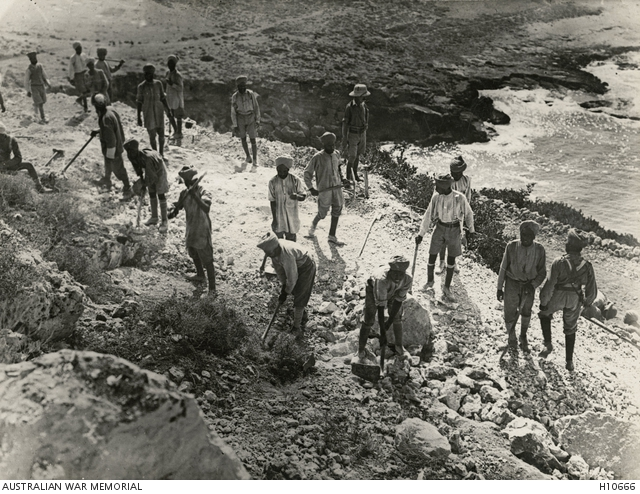
British Indian Army Sikh Pioneers building a new road on the most difficult section of the Ladder of Tyre in September/October 1918 during the pursuit of the Ottoman Yildirim Army

Extensive use was made of pioneers in the British Indian Army because of the demands of campaigning in difficult terrain with little or no infrastructure. The twelve Indian Pioneer regiments in existence in 1914 were trained and equipped for road, rail and engineering work, as well as for conventional infantry service. While this dual function did not qualify them to be regarded as elite units, the frequency with which they saw active service made postings to pioneer regiments popular with British officers.

The Pioneer Corps were disbanded in 1933 and their personnel mostly transferred into the Corps of Sappers and Miners, whose role they had come to parallel. It was concluded that the Pioneer battalions had become less technically effective than the Sappers and Miners, but too well trained in specialist functions to warrant being used as ordinary infantry. In addition, their major role of frontier road building had now been allocated to civilian workers.

Post-Independence of India

The re-organization commenced in 1940 at Jhelum (now in Pakistan). Thereafter it became the Auxiliary Pioneers Corps in 1941 and subsequently the Indian Auxiliary Pioneer Corps with effect from 13 October 1942. 25 November 1941 is celebrated as the Raising day of the Pioneer Corp. An Indian Pioneer Corps was re-established in 1943 and now have 16 companies.

=== Operation Vijay ===
In 1999 during Operation Vijay, two Pioneer Companies worked non-stop along with Border Roads Organisation to ensure that the lines of communication on the Srinagar-Leh, the Jammu-Poonch-Rajouri and Jammu-Srinagar areas remained open at all times.

== See also ==
- Indian Army
- 106th Hazara Pioneers
- Madras Pioneers
- Pioneer (military)
- Indian Army Service Corps
