= List of museums in Eritrea =

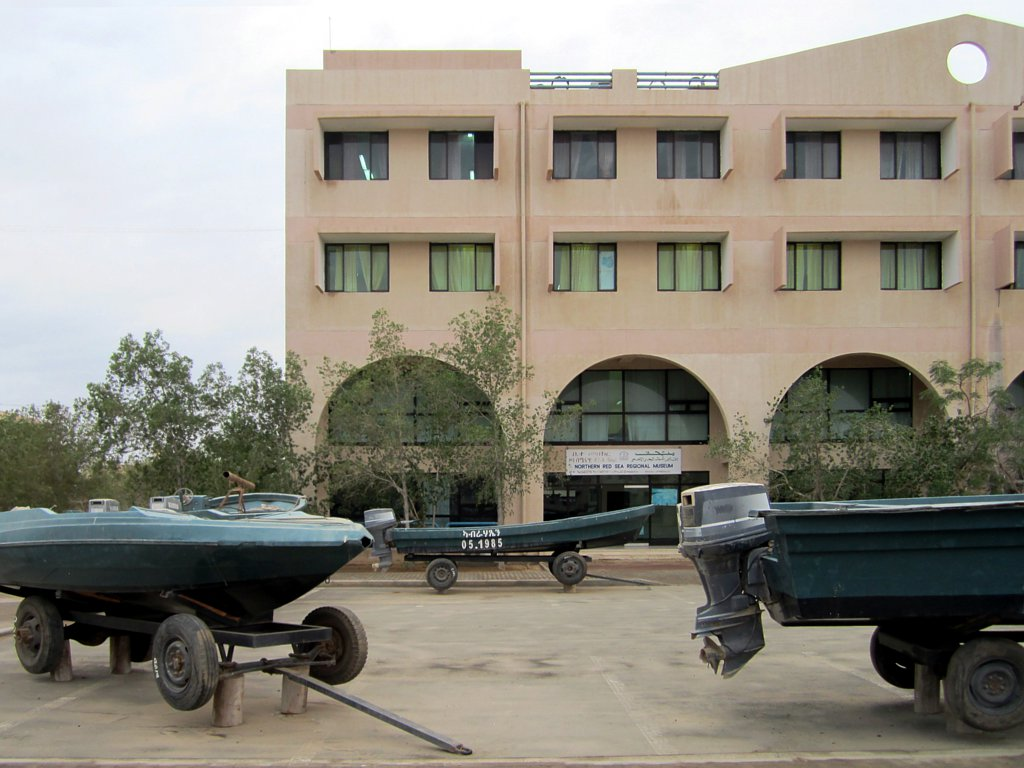
The Northern Red Sea National Museum in Massawa.

This is a list of museums in Eritrea.

== Museums ==
- National Museum of Eritrea
- Northern Red Sea Regional Museum
- Southern Red Sea National Museum

== See also ==
- List of museums
