= Yob Wildlife Reserve =

Protected area in Eritrea

- IUCN category IV (habitat/species management area)
- Location within Eritrea
- Location: Northern Red Sea Region and Anseba Region, Eritrea
- Nearest city: Nakfa
- Coordinates: 17.2575°N 37.76°E
- Area: 265,800 hectares (2,658 km^{2})
- Established: 16 March 1959

Yob Wildlife Reserve is a protected area in the Northern Red Sea and Anseba regions of northern Eritrea. According to the Gazetta Eritrea, it was established on 16 March 1959 by the British, specifically to protect the significant populations of Nubian ibex in the area.

The reserve is managed by the Wildlife Conservation Department of the Eritrean Ministry of Agriculture. It covers an area of 265,800 hectares (657,000 acres), and its protection appears to have been reaffirmed on 1 January 1975.
