= National Museum of Eritrea =

Coordinates: 15°20′00″N 38°55′38″E

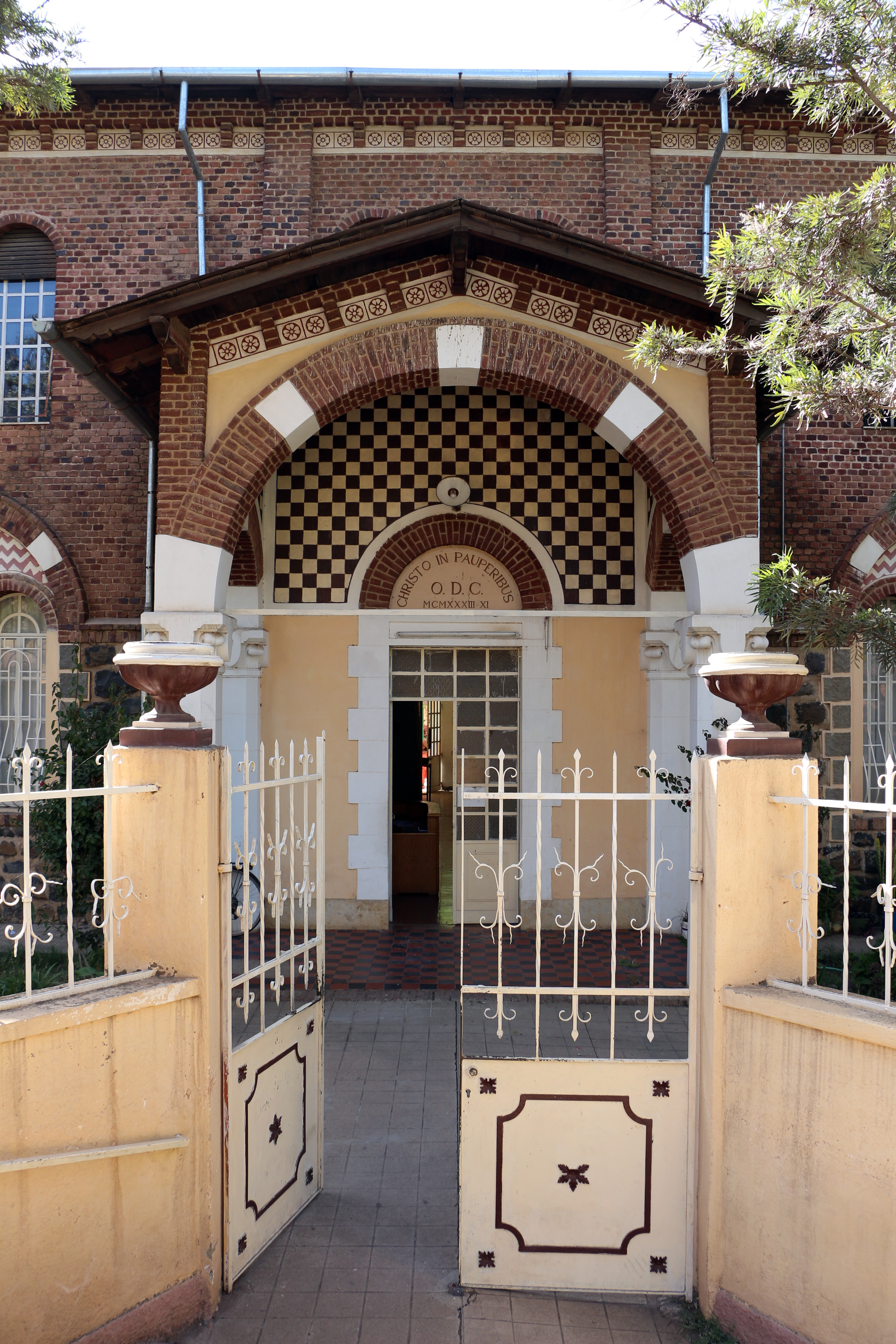
- Established: 1992
- Location: Governor's Palace (until 1997), Asmara, Eritrea
- Type: national museum

The National Museum of Eritrea (Tigrinya: ሃገራቂ ቤተ መዘክር ኤርትራ, romanized: Hāgarāqi Beta Mazakǝr Erǝtǝrā) is a national museum in Asmara, Eritrea. Established in 1992 by Woldeab Woldemariam, it was originally located in the former Governor's Palace until 1997, when it was moved. The venue has since been relocated to the former Comboni Sisters School for Women.

The function of the National Museum of Eritrea is to promote Eritrean history, both within the country and abroad. It also aims to investigate new archaeological sites, and to explore the country's history. In 1996, Eritrea's central government nominated the following six sites to be considered as UNESCO World Heritage Sites: Adulis, Dahlak Kebir, Matara, Nakfa and Qohaito.

== Background ==
North-central Eritrea was the coastal region of the Ethiopian Empire until 1889. Italian colonial occupation of northern Ethiopia began during the 1880s, out of which Italian Eritrea was formally created in 1890, following the death of Emperor Yohannes. It was ruled by Italy until 1941, after which it was taken over by the British. Eritrea was placed under British administration for about 11 years, then returned to Ethiopia in 1952 after a referendum. The emperor Haile Selassie agreed to a federation at first, created from a referendum combining them, but later changed course and in 1962 made it into the 14th province of the country under centralist rule. Eritreans were unhappy with this unilateral action. Haile Selassie's rule became increasingly repressive in Eritrea and all across the empire. Ethiopia had a revolution in 1974 overthrowing the monarch, after which the first Head of State of Ethiopia was Eritrean Brigadier General Aman Michael Andom. He was assassinated a few months later, and the country became a socialist military dictatorship in 1975. The Eritrean Liberation Front fought against the Ethiopian government starting in 1961, followed by the Eritrean People's Liberation Front, until winning (de facto) independence in 1991. All the artifacts which were originally present in Ethiopian National Museum were shifted to Ferdinando Martini Museum. After independence from Ethiopia, the contents were displayed in Governor's palace. During 1992, UNESCO funded the establishment of the National Museum of Eritrea, shifting all the artifacts to the new museum. They also trained the staff of preservation. The Museum is administered by the Ministry of Culture.

== Functions ==
The museum was established in 1992 in the national capital of Asmara, following Eritrea's independence the year before. It is located in the centre of the city. The museum stores historical artifacts of Eritrea, and exhibits cultural items and collections from local sites. It conducts archaeological surveys and excavations at various local sites. The museum also holds artifacts related to contemporary history of Eritrea. Due to the exigencies of border war and the political instability, the museum was in a state of neglect as of 2010. The contemporary collections have predominant collections of the freedom fighters of the nation and paintings depicting the struggle.

== Gallery ==
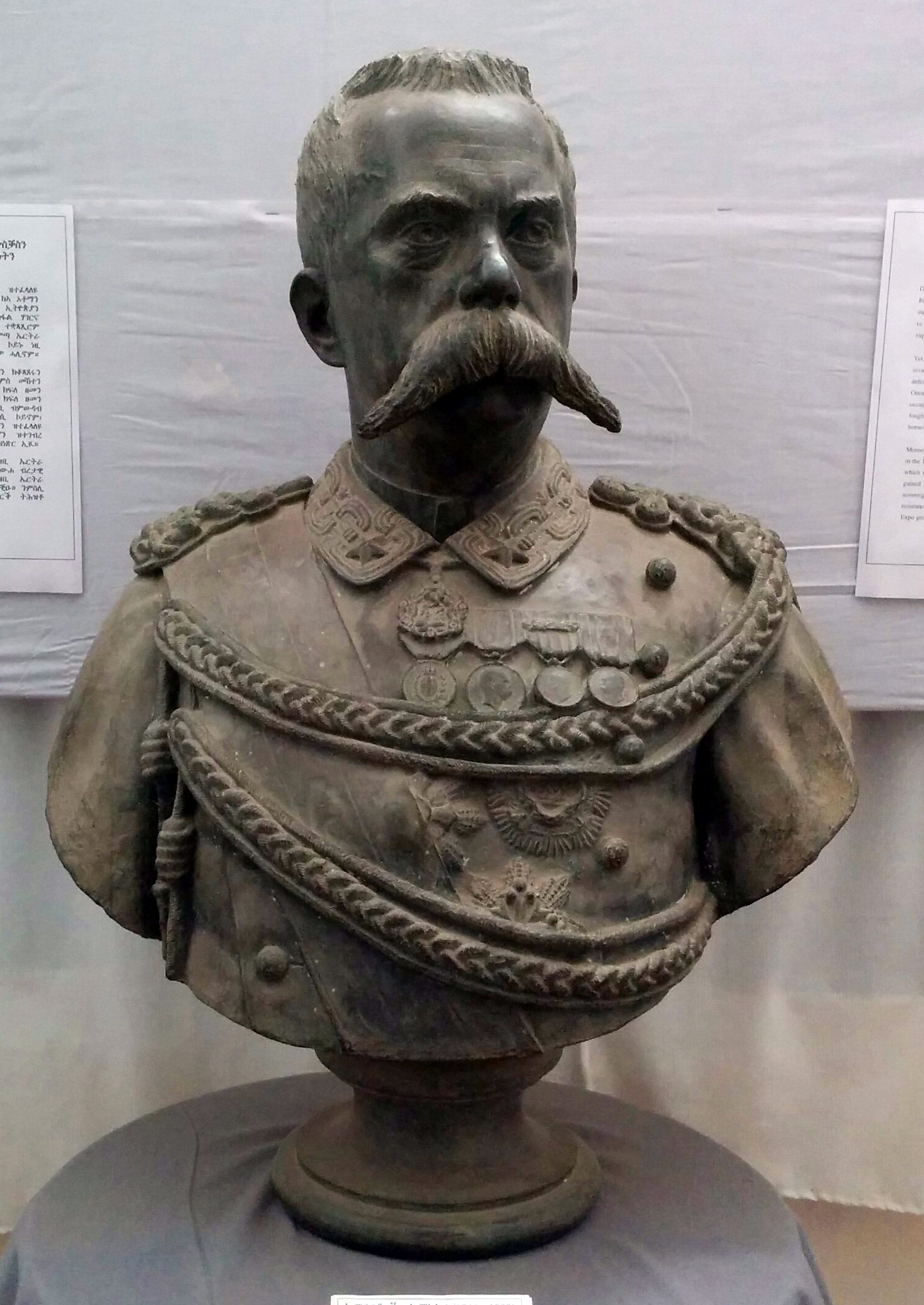
Statue of Umberto I of Italy

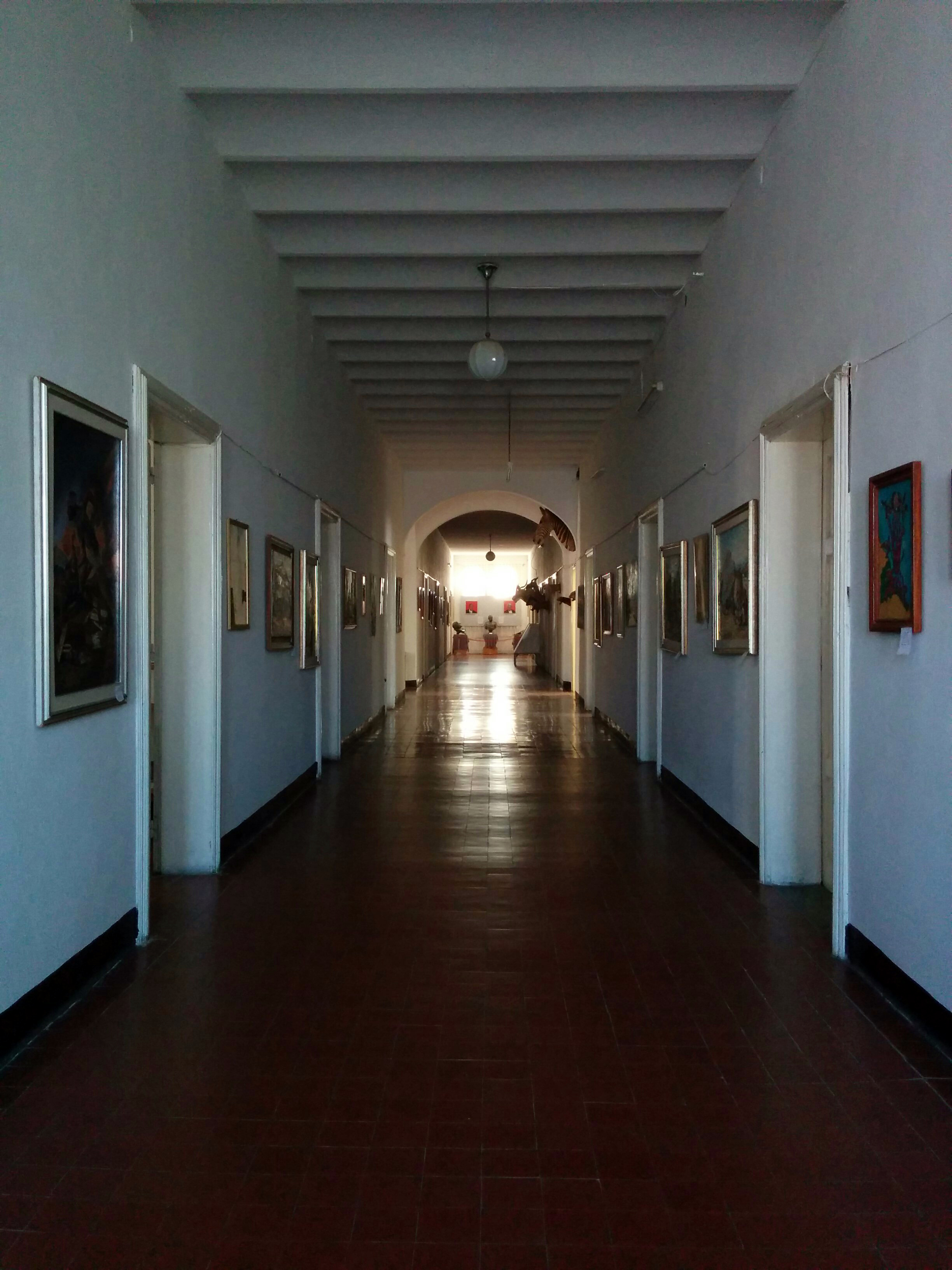
Interior at the museum

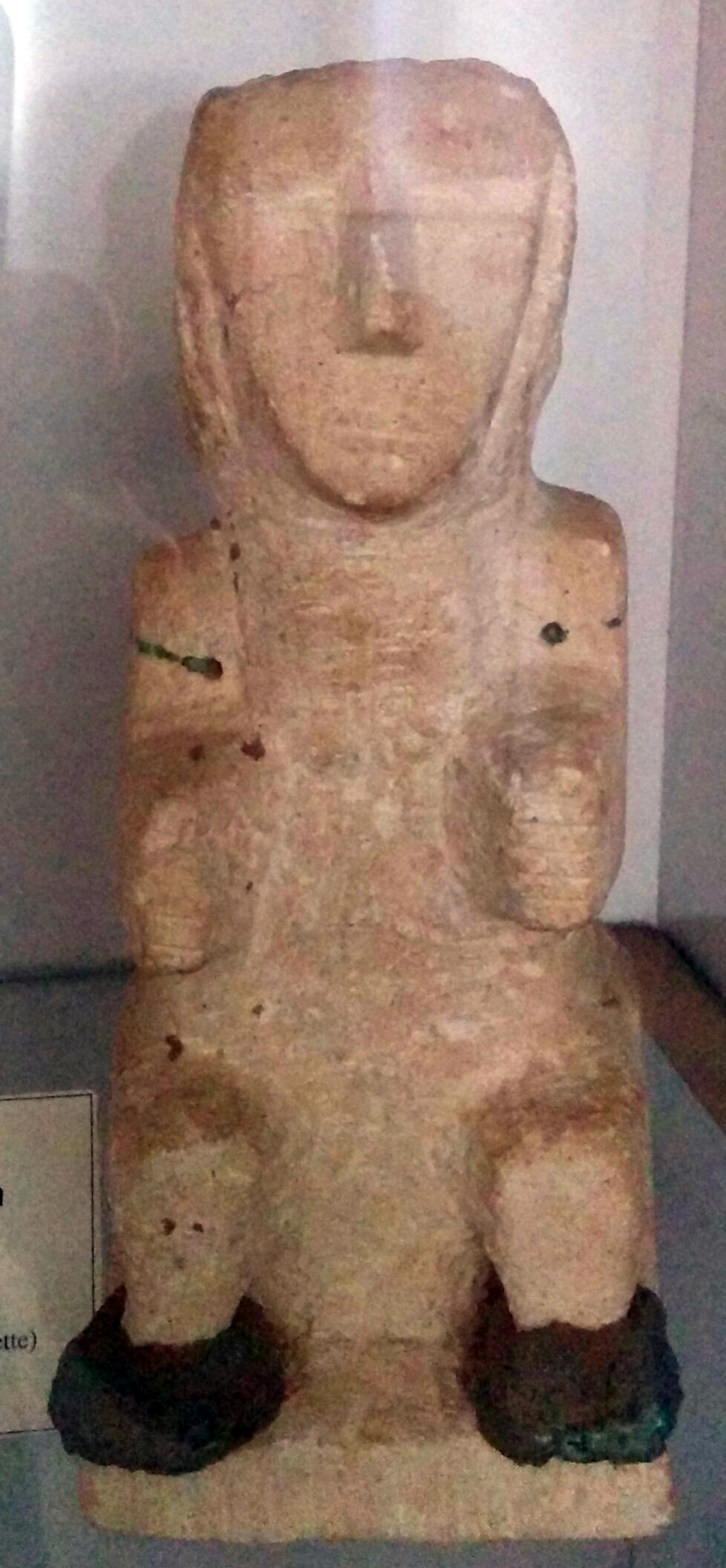
1st millennium AD Adulis figurine, part of the museum's ancient collection

== See also ==
- Hawulti-Melazo
- List of museums in Eritrea
