= Kilbricken =

Hamlet in County Laois, Ireland

Kilbrickan Cill Bhriocáin
- Village
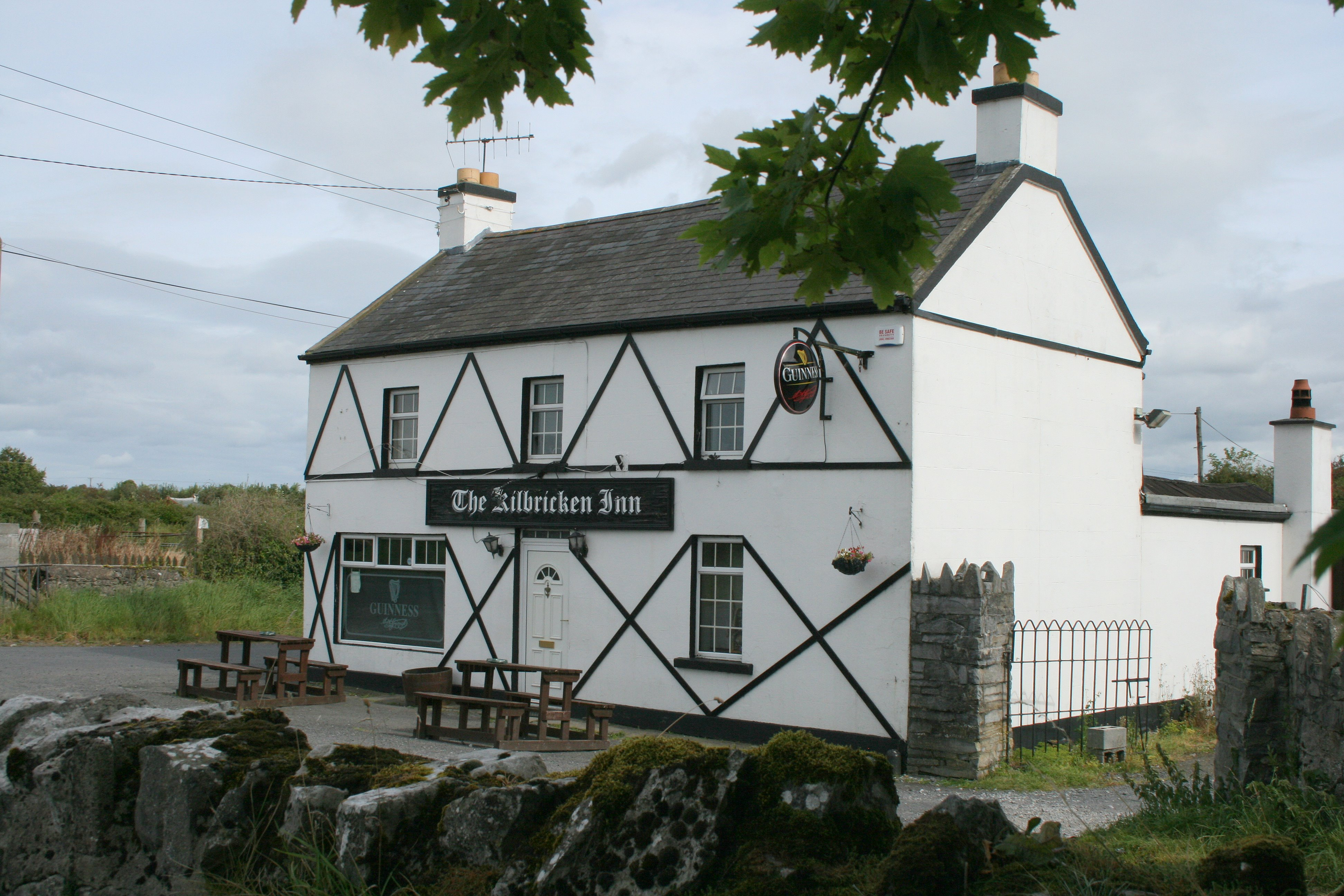
- The Kilbricken Inn

- Location in Ireland
- Coordinates: 52°57′42″N 7°27′44″W
- Country: Ireland
- Province: Leinster
- County: County Laois
- Time zone: UTC+0 (WET)
  - Summer (DST): UTC-1 (IST (WEST))

Kilbricken, officially Kilbrickan (Irish: Cill Bhriocáin, meaning 'Briocán's church'), is a hamlet in County Laois, Ireland, on the Dublin-Cork railway line.

Mountrath & Castletown railway station opened at Kilbricken on 1 September 1848. It was part of the Great Southern and Western Railway in Ireland and was used for 127 years before being closed for goods traffic on 3 November 1975 and finally closed altogether by the CIÉ on 6 September 1976. The station is no longer served and the station buildings are now privately owned. Although derelict, the stone built station can still be seen standing along this track.

== Notable people ==
Victoria Cross winner James Bergin was from Kilbricken.

== See also ==
- List of towns and villages in Ireland
