= Senafe =

Town in Debub, Eritrea

Senafe or Sanafe Hakir, Sancafe
- Location in Eritrea
- Coordinates: 14°42′N 39°25′E
- Country: Eritrea
- Region: Debub
- District: Senafe District
- Elevation: 2,446 m (8,025 ft)
- Climate: BSk

Senafe (Arabic: صنعفى, ) is a market town in southern Eritrea, on the edge of the Eritrean Highlands ሶይራ. The name Sanafe driven from [Sana-feen] yemeni words.The surrounding area is inhabited by the Saho people and the Tigrinya people. It is well known for its cultural and religious historical background, as well as for the ruins of Metera (also known as Balaw Kalaw), Qohayto to the south, and Kaskase to the north.

The soil in the area is derived from volcanic ignimbrite, and Senafe sits on the southeastern edge of a twenty kilometer wide caldera.

== History ==
An early record of Sanafe is on the Egyptus Novelo map, published in 1454. This map shows Sanafe at the edge of Tigray, connected to two routes, one leading west to Axum, the other south to Lake Ashangi. According to James Bruce, the party of Jesuits which included the Catholic patriarch Afonso Mendes and Fr. Jerónimo Lobo, passed through Senafe in 1625, having entered the Horn of Africa by way of Beilul and having crossed the Danikil Desert.

Senafe is mentioned in a 1794–95 land grant (1787 E.C.) from the Ethiopian Emperor Tekle Giyorgis to Ras Wolde Selassie.

During his reconnaissance work for the 1868 British Expedition to Abyssinia, Clements Markham visited Senafe, finding it situated "at the foot of the grand mass of sandstone rock about half a mile north-west of the camp, called Amba-Adana." The town itself consisted "of about a dozen houses built of rough stones and mud, with flat roofs branches being placed in rows across the beams, and covered with mud. Broken jars plastered into the roof, serve as chimneys." He estimated the population to be around 240 inhabitants.

During Italian rule, the town grew notably. The modern town suffered extensive destruction during the Eritrean–Ethiopian War.

== Climate ==
The prevailing climate in Senafe is known as a semi-arid climate; more precisely it lies on the border between a cool semi-arid climate (Köppen BSk) and a hot semi-arid climate (BSh).

Climate data for Senafe
| Month | Jan | Feb | Mar | Apr | May | Jun | Jul | Aug | Sep | Oct | Nov | Dec | Year |
|---|---|---|---|---|---|---|---|---|---|---|---|---|---|
| Mean daily maximum °C (°F) | 24.0 (75.2) | 25.2 (77.4) | 26.5 (79.7) | 26.7 (80.1) | 27.1 (80.8) | 26.7 (80.1) | 22.3 (72.1) | 22.7 (72.9) | 25.2 (77.4) | 24.6 (76.3) | 23.5 (74.3) | 23.1 (73.6) | 24.8 (76.7) |
| Mean daily minimum °C (°F) | 7.6 (45.7) | 8.6 (47.5) | 10.3 (50.5) | 11.4 (52.5) | 11.9 (53.4) | 11.5 (52.7) | 11.2 (52.2) | 11.9 (53.4) | 10.4 (50.7) | 9.5 (49.1) | 8.3 (46.9) | 7.0 (44.6) | 10.0 (49.9) |
| Average rainfall mm (inches) | 4 (0.2) | 7 (0.3) | 25 (1.0) | 59 (2.3) | 41 (1.6) | 31 (1.2) | 158 (6.2) | 135 (5.3) | 21 (0.8) | 10 (0.4) | 20 (0.8) | 4 (0.2) | 515 (20.3) |
Source: Climate-Data.org, altitude: 2,446 metres or 8,025 feet
