= Keskese =

Coordinates: 14°44′49″N 39°25′29″E

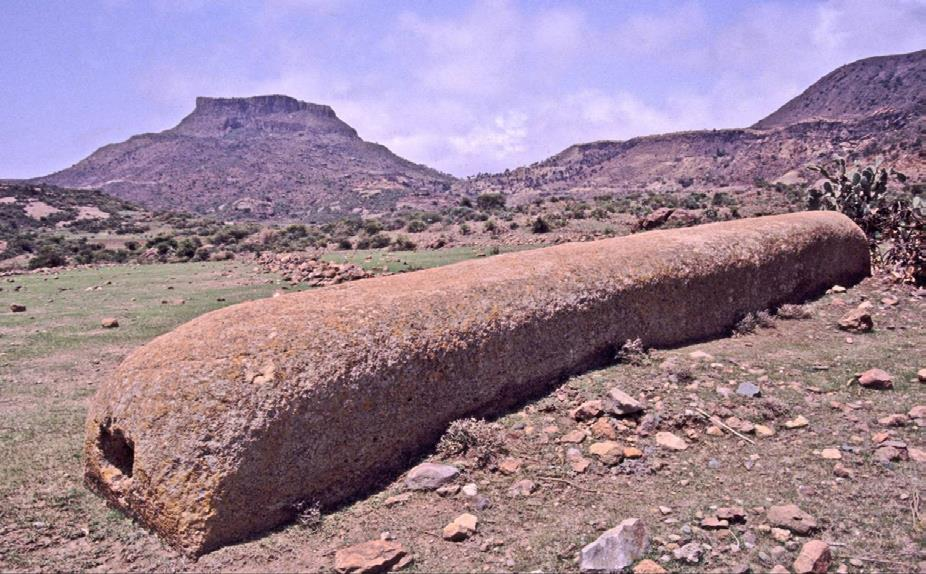
Ancient Eritrea, dating back to the dʿmt period.

Keskese (Ge'ez: ከስከሰ; Sabaean: 𐩫𐩪𐩫𐩪) is an archaeological site in Eritrea. It is the seat of an ancient ruin from dʿmt and is situated 8 kilometres (5.0 mi) north of Matara.

Dating from around 500 BCE, it is renowned for its ancient steles. Some of the edifices at the site are inscribed in Geʿez, and are up to 14 metres (46 ft) in height. Keskese was excavated by Daniel Habtemichael in the early 2000s (decade).

== See also ==
- Adulis
- Matara
- Nakfa
- Qohaito
- Sembel
