= Yuri Kobishchanov =

Russian Africanist (1934–2022)

Yuri Mikhailovich Kobishchanov (Russian: Юрий Михайлович Кобищанов; 8 October 1934 – 29 July 2022) was a Soviet and Russian Africanist, historian, sociologist and ethnologist. He graduated from the Institute of Asian and African Studies at Moscow State University in 1958.

== Works ==
- Axum – Moscow, 1966.

- Kobishchanov, Yuri M. (1979) [1966]. Michels, Joseph W. (ed.). Axum. Translated by Lorraine T. Kapitanoff (Illustrated ed.). University Park and London: Pennsylvania State University Press. pp. 1–348. ISBN 978-0-271-00531-7.

- Africa: the emergence of backwardness and the path of development. – Moscow, 1974 (together with others..).
- The community in Africa. typology of problems. – M., 1978 (together with others..).
- North-East Africa in the early-medieval world (VI – VII centuries the middle.). – M., 1981.
- At the dawn of civilization. Africa in the ancient world. – M., 1980.
- Melkonaturalnoe production in communal and caste systems in Africa. – M., 1982.
- Poljud: The phenomenon of Russian and world history. – M., 1995.
- Contributor to Essays on the history of Islamic civilization in 2 vols. (ed YM Kobischanova). – M .: ROSSPEN 2008.
