= Madras Engineer Group =

Indian Army unit

- Active: 1780–present
- Country: British India; India
- Branch: British Indian Army; Indian Army
- Type: Combat Engineers
- Role: Combat support
- Garrison/HQ: Bangalore, Karnataka
- Motto: Sarvatra! (Everywhere)
- Engagements: Second Anglo-Afghan War; First World War; Second World War; Burma Campaign; Sino-Indian War; Indo-Pak War-1947; Indo-Pak War-1965; Indo-Pak War-1971; Kargil War
- Battle honours: See Battle honours list

Commanders
- Colonel Comdt of Madras Sappers: Lt Gen AK Ramesh

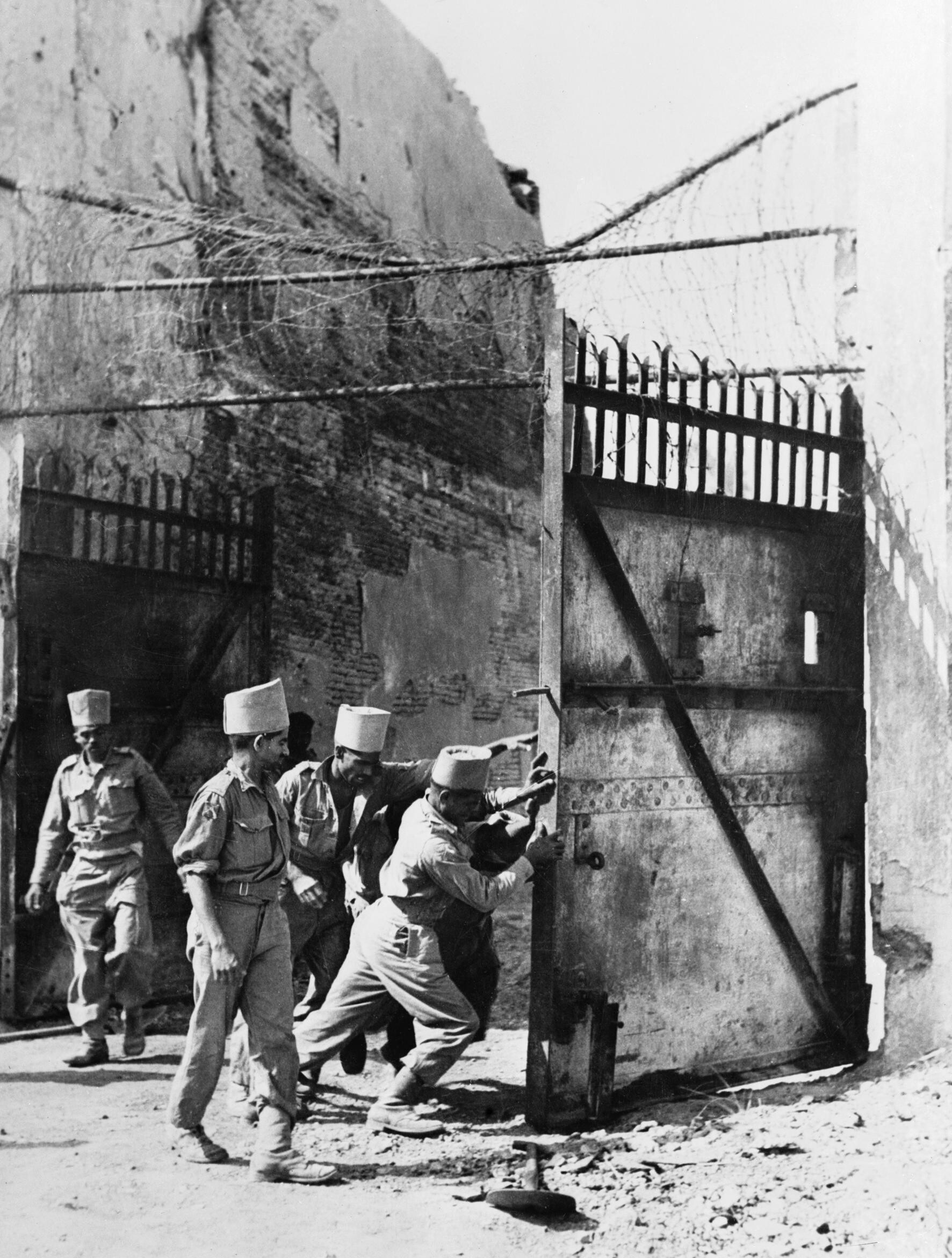
Madras Sappers at the gates of Fort Dufferin, Mandalay, Burma, March 1945.

Madras Engineer Group (MEG), informally known as the Madras Sappers, is an engineer group of the Corps of Engineers of the Indian Army. The Madras Sappers draw their origin from the erstwhile Madras Presidency army of the British Raj. This regiment has its HQ in Bengaluru, Karnataka. The Madras Sappers are the oldest of the three groups of the Corps of Engineers.

The Madras Sappers were the only regiment of the Madras Presidency Army to survive unscathed the extensive reorganisations that took place between 1862 and 1928. The thambis, as the troops of the Madras Sappers are popularly known throughout India, with their hallmark Shakos have distinguished themselves in many battlefields around the world for more than 200 years.

The Bangalore torpedo, a mine-clearing explosive device, was invented in the Centre at Bengaluru in the early years of the Twentieth Century.

== Timeline ==
- 1780 – Created Madras Pioneers from two company of Pioneers (On 30 September 1780 at Madras Patnam)
- 1831 – Renamed Corps of Madras Sappers and Miners
- 1834 – Relocated HQ to Bengaluru, where it remains today
- 1876 – Receive prefix Queens's Own
- 1903 – 2nd Queen's Own Sappers and Miners, Renamed as part of the Kitchener Reforms

== History ==
The second half of the eighteenth century found the East India Company involved in the politics of India and in conflict with the French and a number of native states, amongst whom Mysore, the Marathas and the remnants of the Mughal empire were prominent. The newly raised army of the Madras Presidency was deficient of combat pioneers who were raised as 'ad hoc' companies and disbanded after the conflicts. The First Anglo-Mysore War highlighted this deficiency and led to the raising of two companies of the Madras Pioneers on 30 September 1780 at Fort St George. These men are the forefathers of the Madras Engineer Group of today and the Corps of Engineers of the Indian Army.

The Madras Pioneers formed an integral part of the armed forces. Their principal job in active warfare was to dig 'saps' or 'trenches' which permitted cannon to be brought in range of enemy fortifications and to dig 'mines' which would explode creating a breach in the fort walls. As a result, Sappers and Miners was born. In addition, the sappers used to lead the way to the breach for the 'forlorn hope' and infantry to follow. They also built roads, bridges, fortifications, wells, and water supplies, and fought as infantry when needed.

Since this group was constituted by the Madras Presidency, and formed part of the Madras Army, they were called the Madras Sappers. Likewise in 1803 and again in 1824, the Bengal Sappers and Bombay Sappers were formed in the other presidencies.

The Madras Sappers recruited and trained small tough and wiry men from South India. These engineer troops fought in numerous campaigns in India at Sholinghur, Srirangapatna, Assaye (along with Major General Arthur Wellesley, later Duke of Wellington), and also in Egypt, China, Burma and other places abroad.

The Madras Sappers moved into Bengaluru in 1834, when they were involved in a major part of the construction activities of the Civilian and Military buildings in Bengaluru. Their association with Bengaluru, where the center is located, continues to this day.

The motto of the Madras Sappers is that common to all three regiments of the Corps of Engineers, Sarvatra (Sanskrit:Everywhere) the Indian equivalent to 'Ubique', the motto of the Royal Engineers.

== Battle honours ==
=== Pre-World War I ===
- Carnatic (1781–82)
- Sholinghur (1781–82)
- Mysore (1792)
- Seringapatam (1799)
- Egypt (1801)
- Assaye (1803)
- Java (1811)
- Nagpur (1819)
- Mehidpur (1819)
- Ava (1825)
- China (1840)
- Meanee (1843)
- Hyderabad (1843)
- Pegu (1852)
- Persia (1856–57)
- Central India (1858)
- Lucknow (1858)
- Taku Forts (1860)
- Pekin (1860)
- Abyssinia (1868)
- Afghanistan (1878–80)
- Egypt (1882)
- Tel-el-Kebir (1882)
- Suakin (1885)
- Tofrek (1885)
- Burma (1885–87)
- Chitral (1895)
- Malakand (1897)
- Tirah (1897–98)
- Punjab Frontier (1897–98)
- Boxer Rebellion (1900)

=== World War I ===
- France & Flanders (1914–15)
- Suez Canal (1915–17)
- Egypt (1915–17)
- Gaza (1917)
- Megiddo (1917)
- Sharon (1918)
- Palestine (1918)
- Baghdad (1915–18)
- Mesopotamia (1915–18)
- Tigris (1916)
- Kut-el-Amara (1917)
- India (1917)
- Persia (1918)
- N.W. Frontier (1914–15)
- East Africa (1918)

=== World War II ===
- Mersa Matruh (1940–43)
- Ngakyedauk Pass (1942–45)
- Bishenpur (1942–45)
- Meiktila (1942–45)
- Tamu Road (1942–45)
- Cassino I (1943–45)
- Abyssinia (1940–41)
- North Africa (1940–43)
- Iraq (1941)
- Syria (1941)
- Malaya (1941–42)
- Burma (1942–45)
- Italy (1943–45)

=== Post Independence ===
- Zoji La (1948)
- Basantar River (1971)
- Jammu & Kashmir (1947-48)
- Jammu & Kashmir (1965)
- Punjab (1965)
- Jammu & Kashmir (1971)
- Punjab (1971)
- East Pakistan (1971)

== Symbols ==
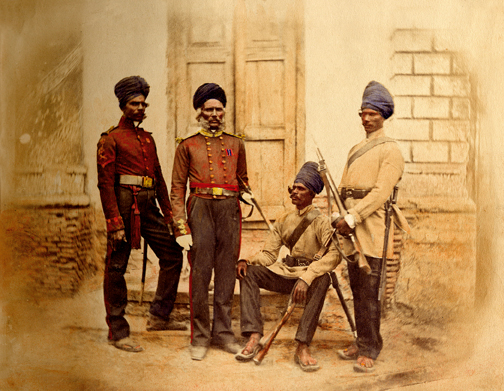
Madras Sappers & Miners at the Qaisar Bagh complex in Lucknow, c 1857

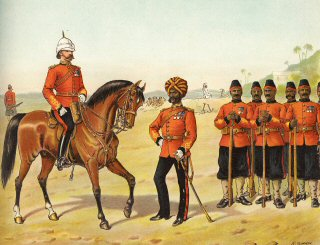
Madras Sappers review order by Richard Simkin, 1896

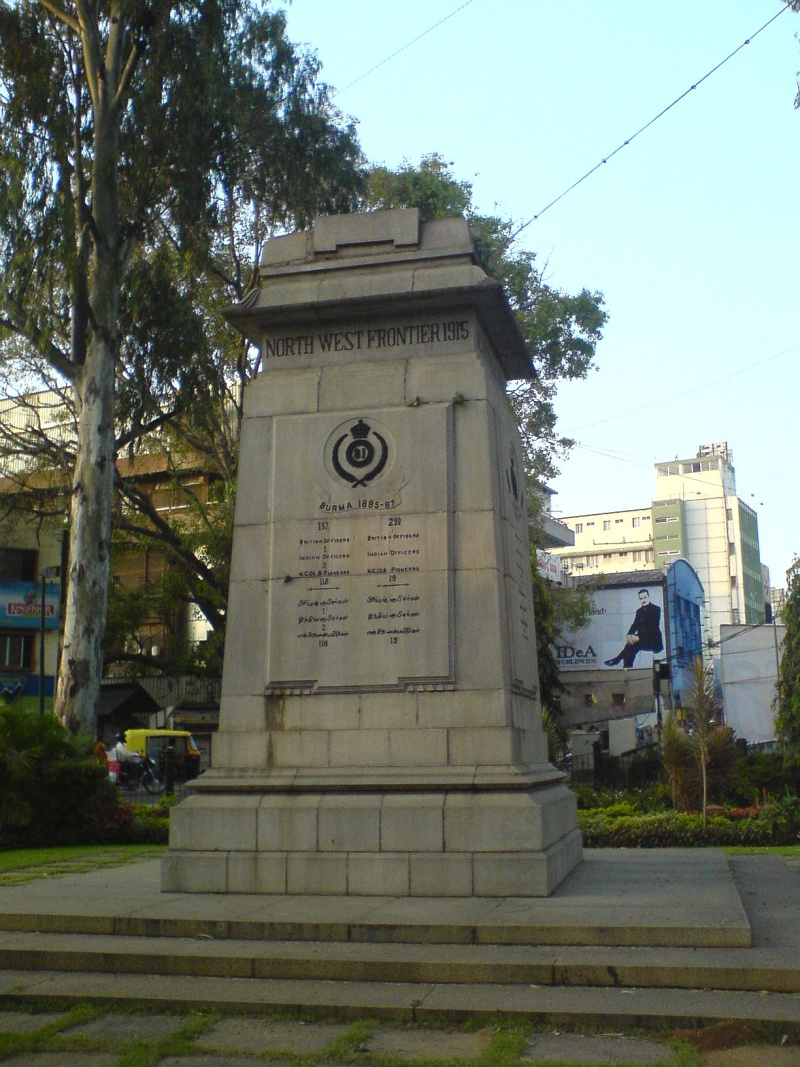
War memorial on Brigade road, Bangalore

The battle symbols of MEG are a sphinx to commemorate the victory in Egypt in 1801, an elephant for the victory in Assaye in 1803, a dragon for China (1848), a bighorn sheep for Zoji La (1948), and a tank for Basantar (1971).

== Republic Day Parade ==
Madras Engineer Group have been actively participating in the annual Republic Day Parade of India. MEG have been awarded the Best Marching Contingent three times in 1991, 1997 and 2017.

== Gallery ==
Sphinx symbol depicting the campaign in Egypt, 1801.

Elephant emblem depicting the Battle of Assaye, 1803.

Dragon symbol depicting the campaign in China, during the First Opium War, 1840.

== See also ==
- Indian Army
- Indian Army Corps of Engineers
- Bengal Engineer Group
- Bombay Engineer Group
- Madras Sappers Military Band

== Book references ==
- Vibart, Henry Meredith (1881), The military history of the Madras engineers and pioneers, London: W.H. Allen & co.
