= James Bergin =

Irish soldier (1845–1880); recipient of the Victoria Cross

- Born: 29 June 1845; Killbriken, Queens County, Ireland
- Died: 1 December 1880 (aged 35); Poona, British India
- Military career
- Allegiance: United Kingdom
- Branch: British Army
- Rank: Private
- Units: 33rd Regiment of Foot
- Awards: Victoria Cross

James Bergin VC (29 June 1845 – 1 December 1880) was an Irish recipient of the Victoria Cross, the highest and most prestigious award for gallantry in the face of the enemy that can be awarded to British and Commonwealth forces.

== Details ==
Bergin was 22 years old, and a private in the 33rd Regiment of Foot, (The Duke of Wellington's Regiment from 1854), British Army during the Abyssinia Expedition when the following deed took place for which he was awarded the VC.

On 13 April 1868 in Abyssinia (now Ethiopia), during the assault on Magdala, when the head of the column of attack was checked by the obstacles at the gate, a small stream of officers and men of the 33rd Regiment and an officer the Royal Engineers broke away from the main approach to Magdala, and, reaching the defences, climbed a cliff, forced their way over a wall and through a strong and thorny fence, thus turning the defenders of the gateway. The first two men to enter Magdala were Private Bergin and Drummer Michael Magner.

He died at Poona British India on 1 December 1880.

== The medal ==
His Victoria Cross is displayed in the Duke of Wellington's Regimental Museum in Bankfield Museum, Halifax, West Yorkshire, England.
