= Madras Pioneers =

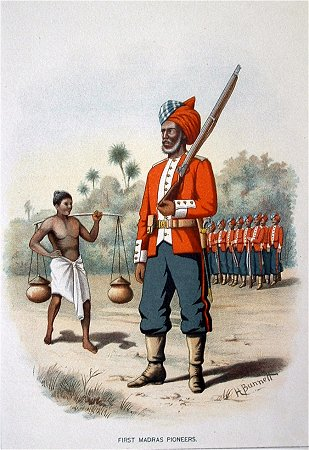
- 1st Madras Pioneers by H Bunnett
- Active: 1780–1831
- Country: India
- Type: Engineers
- Role: Support
- Garrison/HQ: Madras Patnam
- Engagements: Battles list
- Battle honours: See

The Madras Pioneers were pioneer units as well as sappers and miners which were part of the Madras Army.

The Madras Engineer Group were raised as two companies of pioneers in 1780 called the Madras Pioneers, which were expanded and titled 'Corps of Madras Pioneers' but later renamed the 'Corps of Madras Sappers and Miners' in 1831.

In addition, a separate Corps of Madras Pioneers was also in existence in the late 19th century and early 20th century which was disbanded in 1933, along with other pioneer battalions of the British Indian Army. The troops, equipment and regimental property of the disbanded pioneer battalions were absorbed into the Sappers and Miners of their respective presidencies; in the case of Madras Pioneers, with the Madras Sappers.

== Gallery ==
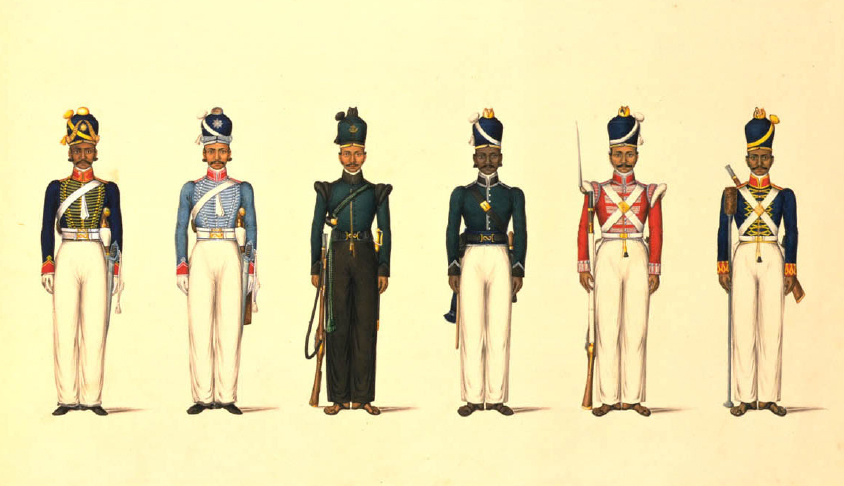
(L-R) Madras Horse Artillery, Madras Light Cavalry, Madras Rifle Corps, Madras Pioneers, Madras Native Infantry, Foot Artillery
