= Michael Magner =

Irish recipient of the Victoria Cross (1840–1897)

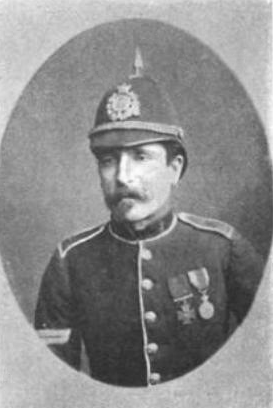
- Born: 21 June 1840; County Fermanagh, Ireland
- Died: 6 February 1897 (aged 56); Melbourne, Australia
- Military career
- Allegiance: United Kingdom
- Branch: British Army
- Rank: Corporal
- Units: 33rd Regiment of Foot
- Conflicts: Abyssinia Expedition
- Awards: Victoria Cross

Michael Magner VC (21 June 1840 – 6 February 1897) was born in County Fermanagh, Ireland and was an Irish recipient of the Victoria Cross, the highest and most prestigious award for gallantry in the face of the enemy that can be awarded to British and Commonwealth forces.

== Details ==
He was 27 years old, and a drummer in the 33rd Regiment of Foot, later the Duke of Wellington's Regiment, British Army, during the Abyssinia Expedition when the following deed took place for which he was awarded the VC.

On 13 April 1868 in Abyssinia (now Ethiopia), during the assault on Magdala, when the head of the column of attack was checked by the obstacles at the gate, a small stream of officers and men of the 33rd Regiment and an officer of the Royal Engineers broke away from the main approach to Magdala and, reaching the defences, climbed a cliff, forced their way over a wall and through a strong and thorny fence, thus turning the defenders of the gateway. The first two men to enter Magdala were Drummer Magner and a private (James Bergin).

Magner later achieved the rank of corporal. He died in Melbourne, Australia on 6 February 1897.

== The medal ==
Magner's medal is on public display in Museum Victoria, Carlton Gardens, Melbourne, Australia.
