= Zula =

- Location in Eritrea
- Coordinates: 15°15′N 39°40′E
- Country: Eritrea
- Region: Northern Red Sea

Zula is a small town in central Eritrea. It is situated near the head of Annesley Bay (also known as the Gulf of Zula), on the Red Sea coast. Four kilometers away is the archeological site of Adulis, which was an emporium and the port of Axum.

== History ==
The Eritrean Research Project Team composed of Eritrean, Canadian, American, Dutch and French scientists discovered a Paleolithic site with stone and obsidian tools dated to over 125,000 years old south of Massawa, along the Red Sea littoral. The tools are believed to have been used by early humans to harvest marine resources like clams and oysters.

The local Saho call this place "Ado Lay", meaning "clear water", however this is probably in reference to the nearby site of Adulis, just situated 4 kilometers away from the town.

In 1857, an agreement was entered into by the Dejazmach of Tigray, in revolt against Emperor Tewodros II of Ethiopia, to cede Zula to the French. Agew Niguse was defeated by Emperor Tewodros, and the commander of a French cruiser sent to Annesley Bay in 1859 found the country in a state of anarchy. No further steps were taken by France to assert its sovereignty, and Zula with the neighbouring coast passed, nominally, to Egypt in 1866. Zula was the place where Robert Napier's British expedition of 1867 – 1868 against Tewodros disembarked, Annesley Bay affording safe and ample anchorage for the largest ocean-going vessels. A road was built by the British from Zula to Senafe in the Eritrean Highlands.

The authority of Egypt having lapsed over Zula, an Italian protectorate was proclaimed in 1888, and in 1890 the town was incorporated into the colony of Eritrea. Along with Afta and Irafalo, it remains an important trade center for the Saho people.

== Geography ==
Zula is a village on the Red Sea in central Eritrea. It stands on the right bank of the Aligede River, on a narrow coastal plain on the west side of the Gulf of Zula, some 80 km (50 mi) to the east of Asmara. The coast here is lined with mangroves, and there is an aircraft landing strip 5 km (3 mi) to the north.

The original port of Adulis is now 4 km (2.5 mi) inland, debris washed down from the mountains having accumulated along the coastline, extending it further out to sea. Napier built limited port facilities at Zula to enable his expedition; the remains of the railway tracks, laid by Napier's Expedition to haul his heavy equipment ashore, can still be seen. However, modern port services are handled at Massawa.
