= Nakfa, Eritrea =

Coordinates: 16.6651°N 38.4765°E

Nakfa ናቅፋ ናቕፋ
- Town
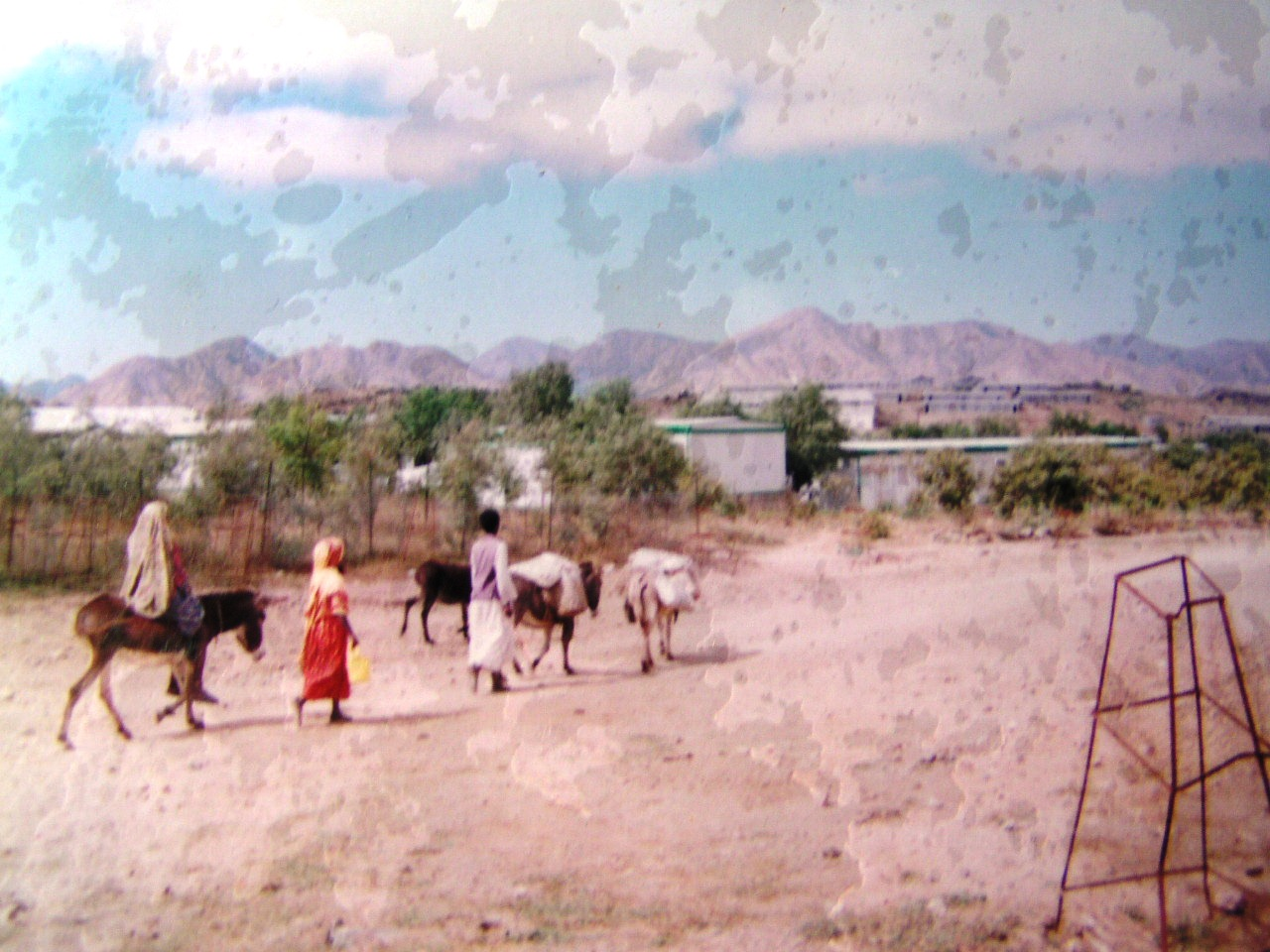
- Nakfa Village

- Location in Eritrea
- Country: Eritrea
- Region: Northern Red Sea
- District: Nakfa
- Climate: BSh

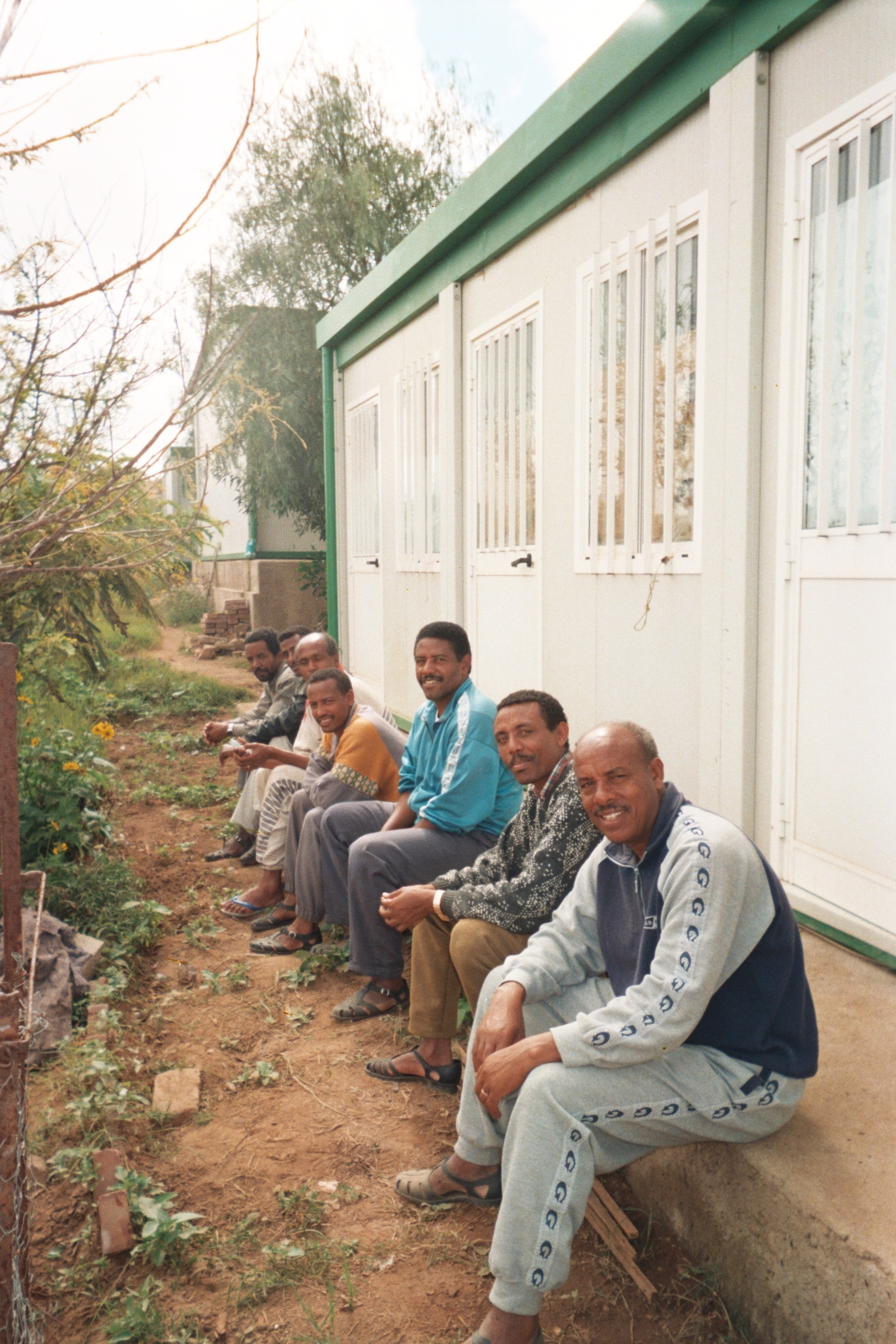
Eritrean people in Nakfa

Nakfa (Tigrinya: ናቕፋ), is a town in the Northern Red Sea region of Eritrea. It is also the name of a sub region of Eritrea.

== History ==
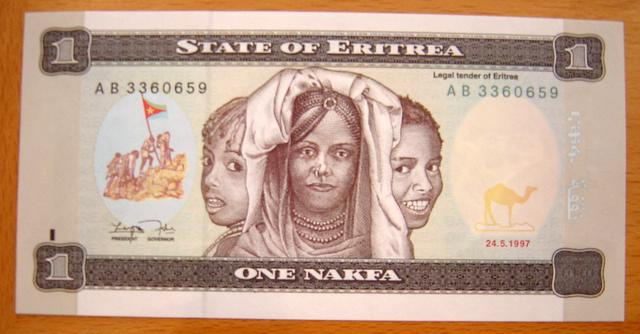
Currency is named after the town

=== Early history ===
The Nakfa area has been inhabited by the Tigre people since ancient times and became an administrative and commercial centre in the 1890s when the Italian colonial government established a post there and grew steadily. In the 1960s, following the incorporation of Eritrea into Ethiopia, the construction of a police post and Mosque in the town was funded by the government of Emperor Haile Selasie. The police presence made it the target of early attacks by the Eritrean Liberation Front and led to the Ethiopians establishing a military garrison there in 1967.

=== Eritrean War of Independence ===
In 1977, after a six-month siege, the Eritrean Peoples Liberation Front, EPLF, took Nakfa from the Ethiopians in its first major victory. For the next decade it was to serve as the major base of the EPLF and was subjected to eight failed attempts by the Ethiopians to retake it, during which most of the town was destroyed, other than the mosque which served as a useful navigation beacon for Ethiopian bombers. The EPLF dug itself in underground where it built hospitals, printing presses, factories, a radio station and a college and constructed rings of trenches and minefields.

=== Post-Independence ===
After Eritrean independence in 1991 the town became the provincial capital of the Sahel Province and there was investment in reconstruction and an airstrip was built. However, in 1995, with the reorganisation of administrative regions it lost that status. It nevertheless remains an important regional centre.

== National currency ==
Such is the symbolic importance of Nakfa to Eritrean liberation struggle that in the post liberation period the national currency, the nakfa, was named after the town in honour of the role it had played.

== Nakfa Sub-Region ==
Nakfa Subregion is a subregion in the Northern Red Sea Region of Eritrea. Its capital lies at Nakfa. The district contains the Yob Wildlife Reserve, established in 1959.

== Education ==
- Tsabra Senior Secondary School, Nakfa
- Winna Technical College, Nakfa.
- Nakfa Primary School

== Transportation in Nakfa ==
The road from Keren to Nakfa via Afabet is extremely narrow and the village van bulges with passengers. The people here are all tribal Muslims and they live in small stone huts. More important is the generator which is essential as this village has no electricity. A telephone is available in the village but it works on sunny days only as the power source is solar.

== Climate ==
Nakfa has a hot semi-arid climate (Köppen climate classification BSh).

Climate data for Nakfa
Month	Jan	Feb	Mar	Apr	May	Jun	Jul	Aug	Sep	Oct	Nov	Dec	Year
Mean daily maximum °C (°F)	21.4 (70.5)	22.0 (71.6)	24.0 (75.2)	25.9 (78.6)	28.4 (83.1)	30.2 (86.4)	28.4 (83.1)	27.5 (81.5)	28.5 (83.3)	25.1 (77.2)	22.5 (72.5)	21.0 (69.8)	25.4 (77.7)
Mean daily minimum °C (°F)	9.5 (49.1)	9.8 (49.6)	10.7 (51.3)	12.4 (54.3)	13.5 (56.3)	16.8 (62.2)	18.4 (65.1)	17.4 (63.3)	15.8 (60.4)	11.6 (52.9)	10.8 (51.4)	9.3 (48.7)	13.0 (55.4)
Average rainfall mm (inches)	4 (0.2)	3 (0.1)	10 (0.4)	28 (1.1)	41 (1.6)	28 (1.1)	74 (2.9)	116 (4.6)	34 (1.3)	21 (0.8)	15 (0.6)	4 (0.2)	378 (14.9)
Source: Climate-Data

== See also ==
- Keren, Eritrea
- Afabet
- Adulis
- Keskese
- Matara
- Qohaito
- Sembel
