= Bombay Engineer Group =

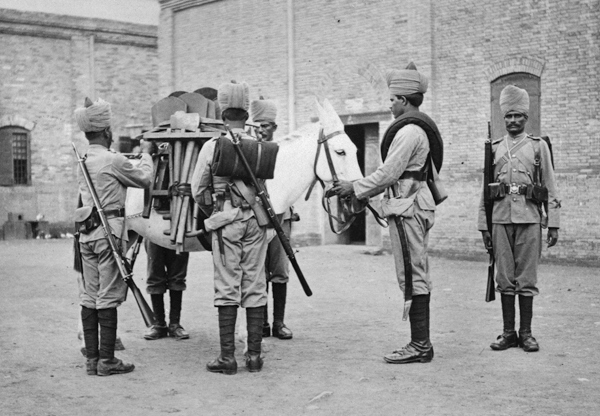
- Bombay Sappers in China during the Boxer Rebellion
- Active: 1780–present
- Country: India
- Branch: Corps of Engineers of Indian Army
- Type: Combat Engineers
- Role: Combat support
- Garrison/HQ: Khadki, Pune
- Motto: Sarvatra!
- Engagements: See Battle honours list
- Battle honours: See Battle honours list
- Website: http://bsakirkee.org

Commanders
- Colonel Commandant: Lt Gen Vikas Rohella, SM**

The Bombay Engineer Group, or the Bombay Sappers as they are informally known, are a regiment of the Corps of Engineers of the Indian Army. The Bombay Sappers draw their origin from the erstwhile Bombay Presidency army of the British Raj. The group has its centre in Khadki, Pune in Maharashtra state. The Bombay Sappers have gone on to win many honours and awards, both in battle and in peacetime, throughout the 19th and 20th centuries, both before and after Independence. The gallantry awards won include the British Victoria Cross and the French Legion of Honour before independence, as well as the Param Vir Chakra and Ashok Chakra as part of Independent India. The Group has also made its mark in peacetime activities such as sport, adventure, disaster relief, aid to civil authority and prestigious construction projects.

== History ==
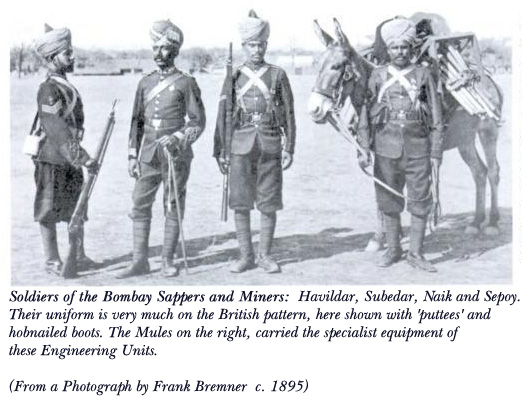
Bombay Sappers soldiers

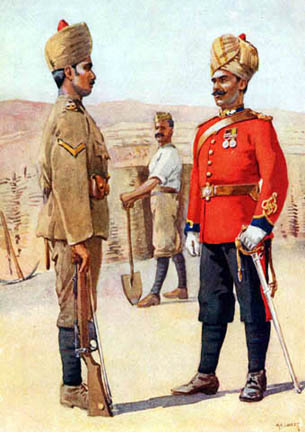
3rd Bombay Sappers and Miners (1910)

The Bombay Sappers draw their origins back to the late 18th century when the British had become a new force in the politics of India which then consisted of a large number of kingdoms and fiefdoms; the principal ones being the Maratha confederacy, Mysore, Hyderabad and Berar, with British presidencies at Bombay, Madras and Bengal in addition to their factories at Surat. The British engaged in conflict with Tipu Sultan and later the Marathas, which along with diplomatic measures resulted in British overlordship over large parts of India.

The earliest instance of recruitment of native sappers was the formation of a company of Pioneer Lascars, comprising 100 men, in 1777 by Major Lawrence Nilson, the first Chief Engineer of the Bombay Presidency. Over the next few years, these newly born Lascars saw action mostly in skirmishes with the Marathas. Soon after being recognised as a Pioneer Corps in 1781, they participated in 1782–84 expedition to the Malabar coast against Tipu Sultan's forces in the Second Mysore War and also saw action in the Third Mysore War, when they served at Calicut and at the first siege of Seringapatam.

In 1797, the Bombay Pioneer Corps was organised afresh with four companies of 100 men each, under Captain-Lieutenant Bryce Moncrieff (Bo.E.) into which the Pioneer Lascars were wholly absorbed. The Bombay Pioneers rendered sterling service in road construction and survey of the Malabar and Kanara for some years, in the midst of which they participated with merit in the Fourth Mysore War (1799), participating in the defense of Manatana, Battle of Seedaseer and the siege and capture of Seringapatam. The Bombay Pioneers next saw service in 1803 during the Second Maratha War under Sir Arthur Wellesley, later the Duke of Wellington, excelling at Gawilgarh and rendering sterling service in the many campaigns by maintaining lines of communication and helping the heavy cannons reach the battlefield.

The successful defeat of Maratha ambitions South of the Vindhyas was followed by stringent economisation in 1807 which found the Bombay Pioneers reduced to only one company, till, in 1812, the inescapable demands of a vibrant and growing Presidency led to the Corps being increased to a strength of four companies, Numbers 1 to 4. Soon after during the Third Maratha War (1818–1820), the four companies paid a vital role in the capture of the erstwhile Peshwa's territories by the reduction of as many as 33 forts in the Konkan, Khandesh and Deccan. Impending operations in Central India led to the Corps being expanded to six companies in 1819 and to eight companies in 1822 when they were officially recognised as a battalion.

Besides the Bombay Pioneers, a separate company of Engineer Lascars had been raised in 1820 and designated as 'Sappers and Miners Company'. This field company was the first Bombay Sapper unit to proceed abroad when in 1821 it sailed for operations against pirates on the Arabian coast and earned for itself the first battle honour of the Corps, Beni Boo Alli. In 1826, a second company was raised and the 'Sappers & Miners' made into the Engineer Corps in 1829.

Earlier, in 1803, a pontoon train had been raised by the British at Bombay to help with the crossing of the rivers of the Deccan in monsoon. This proved unable to keep up with the swift movement of infantry and cavalry characteristic of Sir Arthur Wellesley's manoeuvres, but later proved to be useful for operations in Gujarat. This too was merged with the Engineer Corps.

In 1830, the Bombay Pioneers were reduced from eight to six companies and the pioneer companies merged into the Engineer Corps. The Engineer Corps was reduced in strength yet again in 1834 as part of a general retrenchment to just one Sapper & Miner and three Pioneer companies. Soon after in 1839, the Bombay Engineer companies took part in operations in Afghanistan, distinguishing themselves at Ghuznee and Khelat.

In 1840, all the pioneer companies were converted into Sappers & Miners and the 'Engineer Corps' renamed as the Bombay Sappers & Miners. The Corps took part in many operations both in India and abroad, the long list of battle and theatre honours earned giving an idea of the sterling service rendered by the Corps both in peace and war. In the 19th century and prior to World War I, the Bombay Sappers served in Arabia, Persia, Abyssinia, China, Somaliland; in India fought in the Mysore, Maratha and Anglo-Sikh Wars; fought in the aftermath of the Mutiny in Mhow, Jhansi, Saugor and Kathiawar and many times over in the Punjab, North West Frontier Province and Afghanistan.

In the 1903 reorganisation of the Indian Army, the Corps was renamed in the newly unified Indian Army as the 3rd Sappers & Miners. A mistaken interpretation of the historic records led to the Bombay Sappers being considered as junior to the Madras and Bengal Sappers whereas they could trace an unbroken descent from before the Madras or Bengal Sappers were formed; the case for reversion being taken up a number of times unsuccessfully, presumably due to inadequate records of the services of the Corps in the late 18th century.

The Bombay Sappers expanded greatly during the 'Great War' to meet a large number of Indian engineer troops required by the Empire. The Bombay Sappers fought against the Germans and the Turks in Europe, Palestine, Mesopotamia, Aden, Persia, East Africa and also in Afghanistan, Baluchistan and the North West Frontier Province, winning as many as 29 battle and theatre honours. The very large losses of 20 and 21 Field Companies in Europe in 1914–15 led to the Malerkotla Sappers & Miners joining the Corps where they remained affiliated till 1945 when all state forces sapper companies were transferred to the Bengal Sappers ostensibly on grounds of administrative convenience.

In recognition of the prodigious contribution of the Bombay Sappers in World War I, the title 'Royal' was bestowed on the Corps in 1921 and they became the 3rd Royal Bombay Sappers and Miners. The numeral 3rd was removed in 1923 and the Corps became the Royal Bombay Sappers and Miners and were so-called right until the end of World War II.

The Second World War once again saw a great wartime expansion and the Bombay Sappers fought the Germans, Italians and the Japanese in Malaya, Singapore, Burma, Abyssinia, Eritrea, North Africa, Syria, Italy and Greece.

After independence, the Group became part of the Corps of Engineers of the Army of independent India. The Bombay Engineers is the only engineers who have a Parachute Field Company, that is 411 (Independent) Parachute Field Company of 50th (Independent) Parachute Brigade situated in Agra.

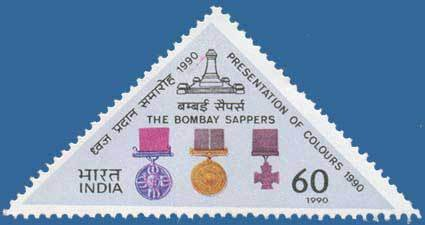
1990 postal stamp on the occasion of the Presentation of the Colours

== Lineage ==
The Bombay Sappers & Miners emerged from the amalgamation of two lineages, firstly, that of the Pioneer Lascars, raised in 1777, and secondly, the Sappers & Miners, raised in 1803 as a Pontoon Train.

Pioneer Lascars

- 1777 - Pioneer Lascars
- 1781 - Pioneer Corps
- 1797 - Bombay Pioneer Corps (4 companies)
- 1807 - Bombay Pioneer Corps (1 company)
- 1812 - Bombay Pioneer Corps (4 companies)
- 1819 - Bombay Pioneer Corps (6 companies)
- 1820 - Bombay Pioneer Corps (8 companies) (Official date of recognition)

Sappers & Miners

- 1803 - Pontoon train
- 1817 - Sappers & Miners
- 1820 - No 1 Company, Sappers & Miners
- 1826 - No 2 Company, Sappers & Miners
- 1829 - Engineer Corps

Amalgamation & after

- 1830 - Amalgamation of Sappers & Pioneers
- 1840 - Bombay Sappers & Miners
- 1903 - 3rd Sappers and Miners
- 1921 - 3rd Royal Bombay Sappers and Miners
- 1923 - Royal Bombay Sappers and Miners
- 1932 - Amalgamation of 2nd Bombay Pioneers and 3rd Sikh Pioneers (Disbanded)
- 1941 - Royal Bombay Sappers and Miners Group
- 1946 - Bombay Sappers and Miners Group, Royal Indian Engineers
- 1950 - Bombay Engineer Group & Centre, Corps of Engineers

== Battle and Theatre honours ==
The list of battle and theatre honours of the Bombay Sappers are as follows: (Note: About Battle & Theatre honours: :(a). The battle and theatre honours are intermixed and arranged chronologically for the reader's convenience. The World War honours are also grouped into theatres of operations. :(b). Dates without parentheses form part of the battle/theatre honour title. Dates not forming part of the title have been added with parentheses for chronological ease of readers and do not form part of the title of the honour. :(c). The honours have been divided into Battle Honours or Theatre Honours according to the lists on p. 53 and 54 of A Brief history of the Bombay Engineer Group, (1996). Theatre honours being shown in italics to distinguish them from battle honours which are not in italics.)

=== Pre-World War I ===
- Beni Boo Alli (1821)
- Afghanistan 1839
- Ghuznee 1839
- Khelat (1839)
- Punjaub (1848–49)
- Mooltan (1848–49)
- Goojerat (1849)
- Persia (1856–57)
- Reshire (1856)
- Bushire (1856)
- Koosh-Ab (1856)
- Central India (1858)
- Abyssinia (1867)
- Afghanistan 1878–80
- Kandahar 1880
- Burma 1885–87
- Punjab Frontier (1897–98)
- Tirah (1897)
- China 1900
- Somaliland 1901–04

=== World War I ===
European theatre

- France and Flanders 1914–15
- La Bassee 1914
- Armentieres 1914
- Festubert 1914, Festubert 1915
- Givenchy 1914
- Neuve Chappelle (1914)
- Ypres 1915
- St Julien (1915)
- Aubers 1915

Palestine

- Palestine 1918
- Megiddo (1918)
- Sharon (1918)
- Nablus (1918)
- Damascus (1918)

Persia, Aden, East Africa

- Persia 1918–19
- Aden 1918
- East Africa 1914–18
- Kilimanjaro 1916

Mesopotamia

- Mesopotamia 1914–18
- Basra (1914)
- Shaiba (1915)
- Ctesiphon (1916)
- Tigris 1916
- Defence of Kut al Amara (1915–16)
- Kut al Amara 1915 & Kut al Amara 1917
- Baghdad 1917

India

- North West Frontier India 1916–17
- Baluchistan 1918
- Afghanistan 1919

=== World War II ===
North Africa & Europe

- North Africa 1940–43
- Abyssinia 1940–41
- Syria 1941
- Italy 1943–45
- Greece 1944–45

South-East Asia

- Malaya 1941–42
- Kuantan (1941–42)
- Burma 1942–45
- Defence of Sinzweya (1944)
- Myinmu Bridge Head (1945)
- Defence of Meiktila (1945)

=== Post-Indian Independence ===
Indo-Pak War (1947 – 48)

- Jammu & Kashmir (1947–48)
- Rajaori (1948)

Indo-Pak War (1965)

- Jammu & Kashmir (1965)

Indo-Pak War (1971)

- East Pakistan (1971)
- Sylhet (1971)
- Jammu & Kashmir (1971)
- Punjab (1971)

Kargil incursion

- Ladakh (1999)
- Dras (1999)

== Regimental details ==
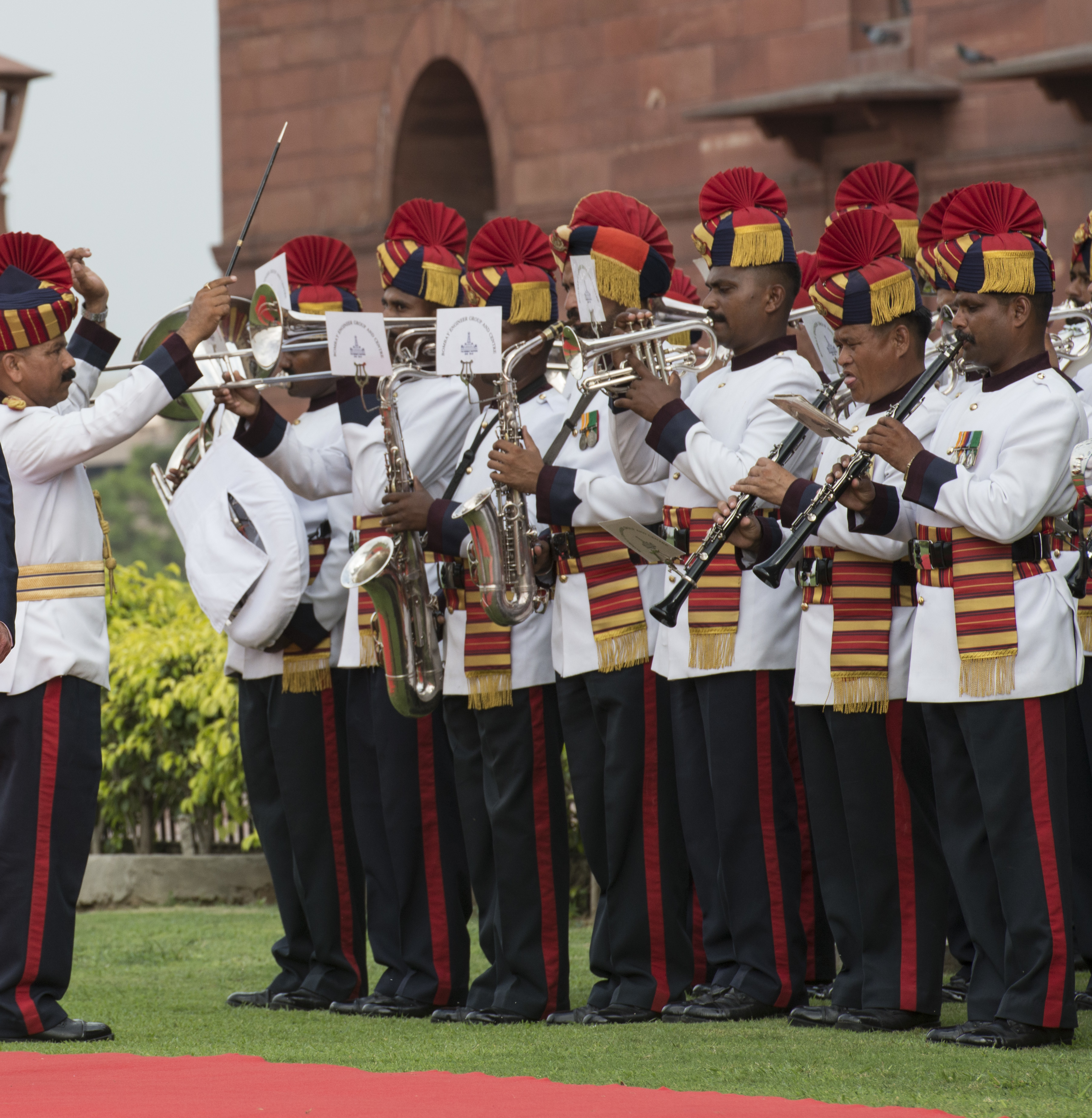
The regimental band during the visit of US Defence Secretary Chuck Hagel at a Tri-Services Guard of Honour ceremony in New Delhi, 8 August 2014

=== Class composition ===
The Group presently has the following class composition:

- Marathas - 40%
- Mazhabi and Ramdasia Sikhs - 40%
- Hindustani Mussalmans - 10%
- Other Indian castes - 10%

=== Centre ===
The regiment's training centre, titled Bombay Engineer Group and Centre, is located in Khadki, near Pune, Maharashtra.

=== Gallantry awards ===
==== Pre-Independence ====
- Victoria Cross - 3
- Legion of Honour - 0
- Medaille Militare - 3

==== Post-Independence ====
- Param Vir Chakra - 1
- Ashok Chakra - 1

== See also ==
- Madras Engineer Group
- Bengal Engineer Group

== Bibliography ==
- Anonymous 1996. A brief history of the Bombay Engineer Group. The Bombay Engineering Group & Centre, Khadki, Pune. Preface & 95 pages.
- Babayya, Brig. K., Ahlawat, Col. Satpal, Kahlon, Col. H.S. & Rawat, Lt.Col. S.S. (eds) 2006 A Tradition of Valour 1820–2006 – an illustrated saga of the Bombay Sappers. The Bombay Engineering Group & Centre, Khadki, Pune. I to xvii. 280 pages.
- Sandes, Lt.Col. E.W.C. 1948. The Indian Sappers and Miners. The Institution of Royal Engineers, Chatham. 726 pp, 31 plates, 51 campaign maps/plans inside and 3 general maps in the end jacket pocket.
- Singh, Maj. Sarbans 1993.Battle Honours of the Indian Army 1757–1971. Vision Books, New Delhi. Pages 372 with 24 Maps, Appendices A to F, Bibliography & Index.
- Barker-Wyatt, Brig. D.A., Jones, Lt.Col. D.L. and Norman, Capt. E.L. 1999. The Royal Bombay Sappers & Miners 1939–1947. The Royal Bombay Sappers & Miners Officers Association. 640 pages and 66 maps.
