= Maratha Light Infantry =

Infantry regiment of Indian army

- Regimental Insignia of the Maratha Light Infantry
- Active: 1768–present
- Country: India
- Branch: Indian Army
- Type: Light Infantry
- Role: Light Infantry
- Regimental Centre: Belgaum, Karnataka
- Mottos: Duty, Honour, Courage
- War Cry: Bola Shri Chhatrapati Shivaji Maharaj Ki Jai (Hail Victory To Great King Chhatrapati Shivaji Maharaj), or Hara Hara Mahadev! (Hail Victory to the great God Shiva!), or Jay Bhavani Jay Shivaji (Hail Victory to Goddess Bhavani and Hail Victory to Great King Chhatrapati Shivaji Maharaj)
- March: Sinhgad
- Anniversaries: 4 February (Regimental Day)
- Decorations: 4 Ashoka Chakras; 3 Victoria Crosses; 29 Param Vishisht Seva Medal; 5 Maha Vir Chakras; 15 Kirti Chakras; 1 ACCL II; 38 Ati Vishisht Seva Medal; 49 Vir Chakras; 63 Shaurya Chakras; 4 ACCL III; 6 Yudh Seva Medal; 470 Sena Medals; 1 Shaurya Chakra & Bar; 29 Vishisht Seva Medal; 1 Padma Bhushan; 1 Arjuna award and 8 Unit Citations.
- Battle honours: Naushera, Jhangar, Burki, Hussainiwala, Jamalpur, Burj, Suadih

Commanders
- Colonel of the regiment: Lt Gen Hitesh Bhalla AVSM, SC**, SM
- Notable commanders: General Joginder Jaswant Singh

The Maratha Light Infantry is a light infantry regiment of the Indian Army. It traces its lineage to the Bombay Sepoys, raised in 1768, making it the most senior light infantry regiment in the Indian Army.

== Recruitment ==
The class composition of the regiment was and is primarily formed by Maratha recruits from the former Maratha Empire. The men were mostly drawn from all over the state of Maharashtra, with some percentage from Marathi-speaking areas of Karnataka including Coorg. As of 2000, the recruitment pattern is as follows–

- Marathas – 86%
- Mysurians – 4.16%
- Muslims of South India – 4.16%
- All classes from Karnataka, Goa, Gujarat, Andhra Pradesh, Madhya Pradesh, without any fixed percentage – 5.55%.

Tradesmen (clerk, sweeper, barber etc.) are recruited from all Indian classes.

== History ==
=== Pre-independence ===
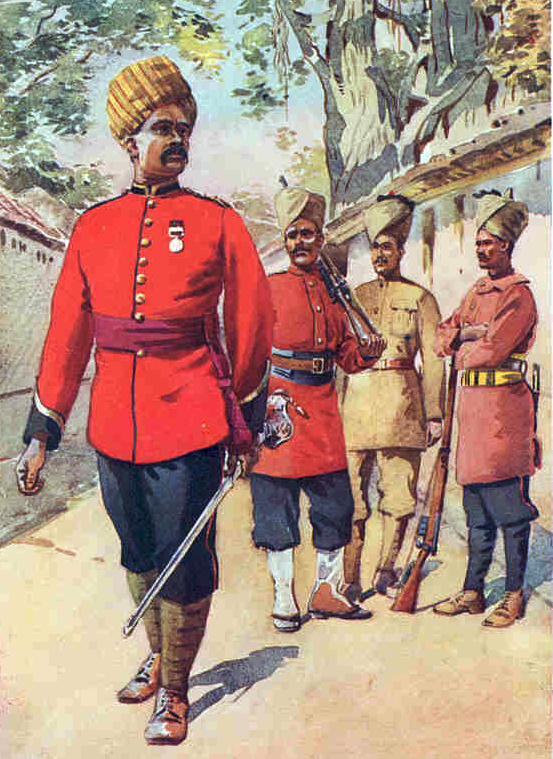
From left to right: Subedar, 103rd Mahratta Light Infantry; Sepoy, 110th Mahratta Light Infantry; Sepoy, 116th Mahrattas; Sepoy, 114th Mahrattas, by AC Lovett (1862–1919)

The Maratha Confederacy was a potent force in India from the 17th to 19th centuries. Their military qualities were brilliantly optimised in their historical campaigns against the Mughal Empire under the leadership of the Chhatrapati Shivaji and succeeding Maratha rulers. Maratha armies, comprising both infantry and light cavalry, and the Maratha Navy had dominated the military scene in India for three centuries. The 1st battalion of the regiment, known as Jangi Paltan ("the fighting unit"), was raised in August 1768 as the 2nd Battalion, Bombay Sepoys, to protect the British East India Company's possessions on the islands of Bombay.

The second battalion known as Kali Panchwin followed the next year as the 3rd Battalion, Bombay Sepoys. These two battalions were at the forefront of virtually every major engagement fought on the west coast from Surat to Cannanore during the last quarter of the 18th century. Prominent amongst these were the historic battles of Seedaseer and Seringapatam, where in the words of Richard Wellesley their conduct and success were seldom equalled and never surpassed.

The turn of the 19th century was witness to the expansion of the regimental group with the raising of the 3rd battalion as the 2nd battalion, 5th (Travancore) Regiment of the Bombay Native Infantry in 1797. The Maratha Light Infantry Regimental Centre was raised in March 1800 as the 2nd battalion, 7th Regiment of Bombay Native Infantry; the 4th battalion in April 1800 as the 2nd battalion, 8th Regiment Bombay Infantry and the 5th battalion from the Bombay Fencibles as the 1st battalion, 9th Regiment of Bombay Native Infantry in December 1800.

In the second half of the 19th century, the battalions fought in various campaigns from the Middle East to China. In recognition of the gallant conduct of its detachments at the siege of Kahun and the defence of Dadar, in Baluch territory during the First Anglo-Afghan War in 1841, the Kali Panchwin was created Light Infantry. Later, this honour was also bestowed on the 3rd and 10th Regiments of the Bombay Infantry (present 1st battalion, Maratha Light Infantry and 2nd battalion, Parachute Regiment respectively) for their gallantry in Sir Robert Napier's Abyssinian Campaign of 1867–1868. The regiment assumed the title 5th Mahratta Light Infantry 1922.

Three Maratha battalions distinguished themselves during the First World War (1914–1918) in the long drawn-out Mesopotamia campaign. The 117th Mahrattas (present 5th battalion, Maratha Light Infantry) was made into a Royal battalion for its conspicuously distinctive service during its campaign in Mesopotamia, particularly in the events leading to enemy capitulation after the bitter 146-day siege at Kut-el-Amara. The battalion was mostly composed of Marathas from the Khandesh region and Nashik district. For some unclear reasons even after winning, the regiment did not return to India. The 114th Mahrattas (present Regimental Centre) was awarded 28 gallantry awards for their performance in the battle of Sharquat, the highest earned by any unit in a single action. The other Maratha battalions, namely the 105th Mahratta Light Infantry, 110th Mahratta Light Infantry and 116th Mahrattas also acquitted themselves in Palestine and Mesopotamia. The 105th lost its commanding officer in action (Lieutenant-Colonel Ernest Richard Inglis Chitty at the battle of Jebel Hamrin, 1917).

The Second World War saw the Marathas at the forefront in almost every theatre of operations from the jungles of Southeast Asia to the deserts of North Africa, and the mountains and rivers of Italy. The war also saw the expansion of the regiment when thirteen new war service battalions were raised. Most of these were later demobilised after the war, whilst two were converted into artillery regiments. During the war Naik Yeshwant Ghadge and Sepoy Namdeo Jadhav were decorated with the Victoria Cross in the Italian campaign, while 130 other decorations were awarded to the regiment. The following battalions saw action during the war –

- East Africa – 2/5th Mahratta Light Infantry, 3/5th Mahratta Light Infantry
- Italy – 1/5th Mahratta Light Infantry, 3/5th Mahratta Light Infantry, 5/5th Mahratta Light Infantry,
- Iraq and Persia – 1/5th Mahratta Light Infantry, 5/5th Mahratta Light Infantry
- North Africa – 1/5th Mahratta Light Infantry
- Burma – 4/5th Mahratta Light Infantry, 6/5th Mahratta Light Infantry, 17/5th Mahratta Light Infantry,
- Java – 4/5th Mahratta Light Infantry, 6/5th Mahratta Light Infantry,

=== Post-independence ===
Indian independence saw the regiment reverted to the original five battalions, with the 3rd Maratha Light Infantry converting to the airborne role and becoming the 2nd battalion, Parachute Regiment in April 1952. With the integration of the erstwhile princely states, the 19th, 20th, 22nd battalions were amalgamated, from the state forces of Satara, Kolhapur, Baroda, and Hyderabad, with the regiment. The expansion of the Indian Army to meet the omnipresent threat to its borders has seen the regiment grow to its present strength of 18 regular battalions and two Territorial Army battalions whilst the period also saw the conversion of the 21st battalion into the 21st battalion, Parachute Regiment (Special Forces) and the 115 Infantry Battalion (TA) being transferred to the Mahar Regiment.

Since independence, battalions of the Maratha Light Infantry have taken part in every Indian armed conflict — the Indo-Pakistani War of 1947, the Annexation of Junagadh, the Annexation of Hyderabad, the Annexation of Goa, the Sino-Indian War, the Indo-Pakistani wars of 1965 and 1971, against the Chinese on the Sikkim watershed in 1956, Operation Pawan, the ongoing operations on the Siachen Glacier and in numerous counter insurgency operations.

== Units ==
The Maratha Light Infantry consists of the following battalions -

Battalion	Raising Date	Remarks	References
1st Battalion	1768	Nicknamed the Jangi Paltan (the fighting unit). Raised as 2nd Battalion, Bombay Sepoys in 1768. Re-designated 1st Battalion, 2nd Regiment of Bombay Native Infantry in 1796, 3rd Regiment of Bombay Native Infantry in 1824, 3rd Regiment of Bombay (Light) Infantry – 1871, 3rd Bombay Light Infantry in 1901, 103rd Mahratta Light Infantry in 1903 and 1st Battalion, 5th Mahratta Light Infantry in 1922. Present designation in 1945. Battle honours – Mysore, Seedaseer, Seringapatam, Beni Boo Ali, Punjab, Mooltan, Goojerat, Abyssinia (pre-independence), Jamalpur (1971 war).	
2nd Battalion	1768	Nicknamed the Kali Panchwin and the Ashok Chakra Paltan. Raised as 3rd Battalion, Bombay Sepoys in 1768. Re-designated 1st Battalion, 3rd Bombay Native Infantry in 1796, 5th Bombay Native Infantry in 1824, 5th Bombay Native (Light) Infantry in 1841, 5th Bombay (Light) Infantry in 1885, 5th Bombay Light Infantry in 1901, 105th Mahratta Light Infantry in 1903 and 2nd Battalion, 5th Mahratta Light Infantry in 1922. Battle honours – Mysore, Seedaser, Seringapatnam, Beni-Boo-Ali, Siege of Kahun, China, Afghanistan, Burma, Mesopotamia, Kut El Amara, Baghdad, Palestine, Nablus, Sharon, Abyssinia, Keren, North Africa, Siege of Tobruk, Gubi (pre-independence) and Hussainiwala (1965 war).	
4th Battalion	1800	Raised as the 2nd Battalion, 7th Regiment of Bombay Native Infantry. Re-designated 16th Bombay Native Infantry in 1824, 16th Bombay Infantry in 1885, 116th Mahrattas in 1903. Battle honours – Afghanistan 1879–80, British East Africa 1901, N.W. Frontier, India 1914–15 '17, Mesopotamia 1914–18, Tengnoupal, Shangshak.	
5th Battalion	1800	Raised as Bombay Fencible Regiment in 1800. Re-designated 1st Battalion, 9th Regiment of Bombay Native Infantry in 1803, 17th Bombay Native Infantry in 1824, 17th Bombay Infantry in 1885, 117th Mahrattas in 1903 and 5th Royal Battalion, 5th Mahratta Light Infantry in 1922. Was designated Royal in recognition of its exemplary service in Mesopotamia in World War I, a rare honour for a single battalion. Battle honours – Shaiba (pre-independence), Battle Honour Suadih and Theatre Honour East Pakistan during 1971 war.	
6th Battalion	1962	Raised at Mardan in 1940 by Lieutenant Colonel E Ross Magnetty, earned the battle honour Tengnoupal. Disbanded in 1947. Re-raised in 1962 by Lieutenant Colonel VK Menon at Belgaum.	
7th Battalion	1963	Re-raised under Lieutenant Colonel ML Dixit at Belgaum.	
8th Battalion	1963	Raised 1941 by Lieutenant Colonel LMC Bellamy in Belgaum. Converted to 4th Mahratta Anti-Tank Regiment in 1942. Re-raised in Belgaum in 1963.	
9th Battalion	1964	Nicknamed the Ashok Chakra Paltan after the award to Colonel Vasanth Venugopal.	
11th Battalion		Nicknamed Aakramak Akraa	
12th Battalion	1982		
14th Battalion	1971	Initially raised as the 14th/5th Mahratta Light Infantry on 1 February 1941, at Ambala by Lieutenant Colonel E.S. Storey-Cooper, disbanded in 1945 following the end of the Second World War. Re-raised in 1971 at Belgaum by Lieutenant Colonel RK Dutt.	
15th Battalion	1966	Raised by Lieutenant Colonel GS Dubhashi at Babina. Won the battle honour Burj and the theatre honour Punjab during the 1971 war. Called the Mahavir Chakra and Ashok Chakra Paltan following the awards to Sepoy Pandurang Salunkhe and Lieutenant Navdeep Singh.	
16th Battalion	1966	Nicknamed Ashok Chakra Paltan after Colonel NJ Nair, who was posthumously awarded the Ashok Chakra in 1994	
17th Battalion	1962	Raised by Lieutenant Colonel AO Kersey in 1941 at Belgaum. Battle honour Ru-Wya during the Burma campaign. Disbanded after World War II. Re-raised by Lieutenant Colonel E D'Souza in 1962 at Belgaum.	
18th Battalion	1976	Raised by Lieutenant Colonel Mohammad Ahmed Zaki	
19th Battalion	1949	From Kolhapur State Forces. Raised as Kolhapur Fusiliers in 1845, redesignated as Kolhapur Infantry in 1846, renamed as Rajaram Rifles in 1941. After the merger of Kolhapur state with Union of India, became 19th Battalion, Maratha Light Infantry (Kolhapur).	
22nd Battalion	1853	Nicknamed the Hyderabadis, raised by Raja Rameshwar Rao of Wanaparthy Samsthanam, later became 4th Regiment of Hyderabad City troops and subsequently named Raja Paltan. Merged under 2nd Hyderabad State Infantry in 1948, joined the Maratha Light Infantry Regiment as 22 Maratha Light Infantry in 1953.	
23rd Battalion		Nicknamed Teevra Teivees	
24th Battalion			
25th Battalion			
26th Battalion	1988	Raised in 1942 by Lieutenant Colonel HS Pearson at Belgaum. Demobilised in 1946 after the war. Re-raised in 1988 by Lieutenant Colonel AB Sayyad.	
16 Bhairav Battalion	2026	Raised in 25 April 2026 at the Maratha Light Infantry Regimental Centre in Belagavi by Brigadier Joydeep Mukherjee, Commandant, MLIRC.	
Territorial Army Battalions			
101 Infantry Battalion (TA)	1918	Raised at Karwar as 2/103 Maharatta Light Infantry. Has undergone several transformations before being finally re-raised and re-designated as 101 Infantry Battalion (TA) Maratha Light Infantry in 1949 by Lieutenant Colonel B Dubal. Located at Pune.	
109 Infantry Battalion (TA)		Located at Kolhapur, Maharashtra	
Former units			
2nd Battalion, Parachute Regiment (Special Forces)	1797	Raised as 2nd Battalion, 5th (Travancore) Regiment of Bombay Native Infantry. Re-designated 10th Bombay Native Infantry in 1818, 10th Bombay Native (Light) Infantry in 1871, 10th Regiment of Bombay (Light) Infantry in 1885, 10th Bombay Light Infantry in 1901, 110th Mahratta Light Infantry in 1903, 3/5th Mahratta Light Infantry in 1922 and finally 3rd Battalion, Maratha Light Infantry	
10th Battalion, Mechanised Infantry Regiment	1949	Formerly 20th Battalion, Maratha Light Infantry. Raised from 1st and 2nd Battalion of Baroda State Infantry. Absorbed into Indian Army and 20th and 21st Battalion of Maratha Light Infantry; later they were amalgamated to form 20th Battalion. It was re-designated 10th Battalion (Baroda). Battle honour Bejai.	
21st Battalion, Parachute Regiment (Special Forces)	1985	Raised as 21st Battalion, Maratha Light Infantry. Converted to Parachute Regiment (Special Forces) in 1996. Nicknamed Waghnakhs.	
Rashtriya Rifles			
17 Rashtriya Rifles	1994	Raised by Colonel RS Nagal, operational in Banihal sector	
27 Rashtriya Rifles	1994	Raised by Colonel B Ahobkirk at Belgaum, serving in areas south of the Pir Panjal Range	
41 Rashtriya Rifles		Raised by Colonel SV Chaudhari at Belgaum, deployed in North Kashmir	
56 Rashtriya Rifles	2000	Raised by Colonel PK Singh at Belgaum, stationed in North Kashmir	

== Affiliated units ==
The following units are affiliated to the regiment –

- 2nd Battalion, The Parachute Regiment (Special Forces)
- 21st Battalion, The Parachute Regiment (Special Forces)
- 10th Battalion, Mechanised Infantry Regiment
- 34 Field Regiment, Regiment of Artillery
- 36 Medium Regiment (Self Propelled), Regiment of Artillery
- INS Mumbai, Indian Navy
- No. 20 Squadron, Indian Air Force
- Indian Coast Guard Air Station, Daman and Diu

== Regimental Centre ==
The regimental centre has been in Belgaum, Karnataka, since 1922, which was part of the Bombay Presidency at that time. The centre's history comes from the conversion of the 114th Mahrattas to the 10th (Training) Battalion, 5th Mahratta Light Infantry. This unit itself traces its origins to 1800 when it was raised as the 2nd Battalion, 7th Regiment of Bombay Native Infantry.

== Battle slogan ==
The battle cry of Maratha Light Infantry is बोला श्री छत्रपती शिवाजी महाराज की जय ("Bola Shri Chhatrapati Shivaji Maharaj Ki Jai (Say Victory to King Chhatrapati Shivaji)"). It replaced the battle cry – Har Har Mahadev (Victory To Lord Shiva) during the Second World War.

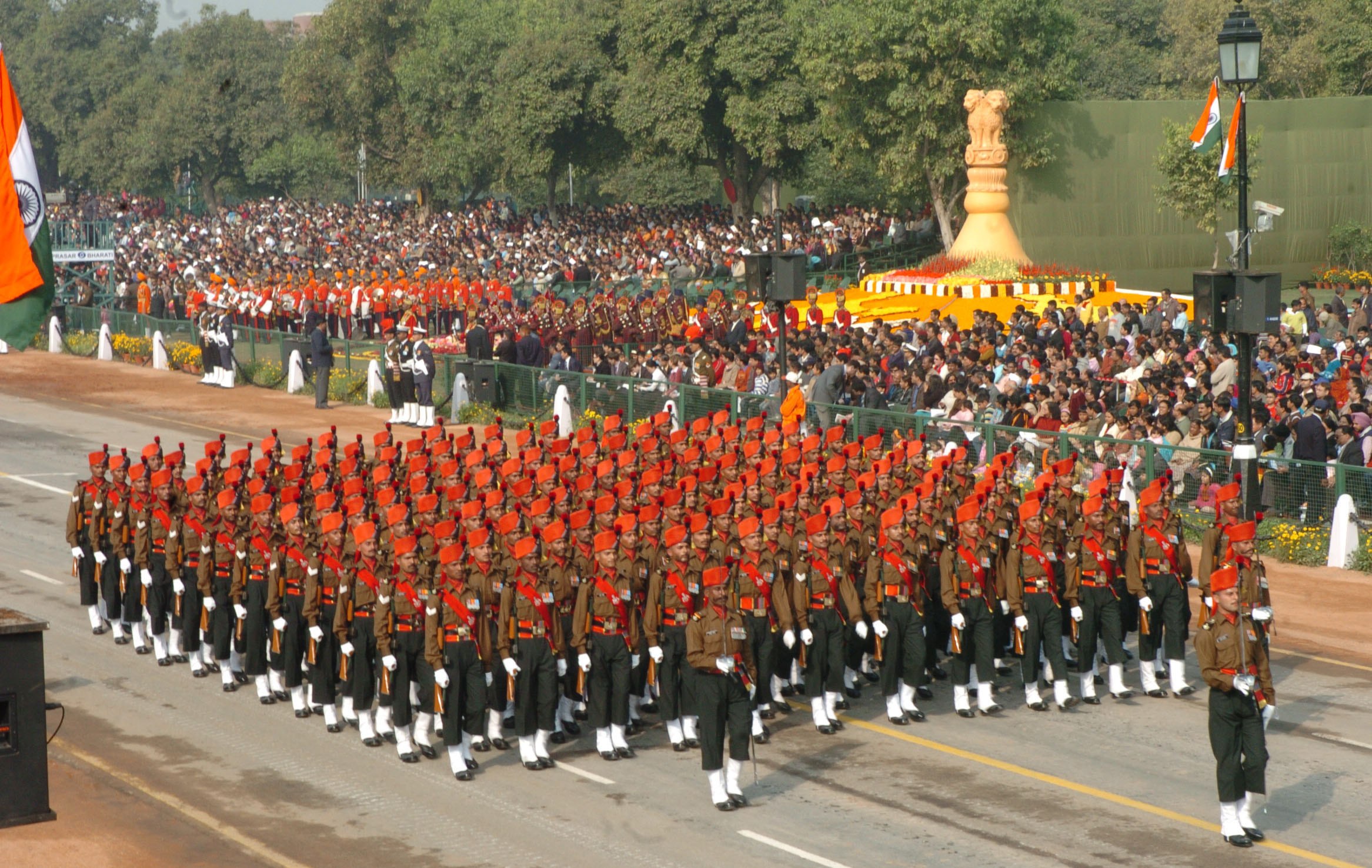
Maratha Light Infantry Regiment marching contingent, Republic Day parade, 2009

== Marching style ==
The soldiers of Maratha Light Infantry have a quick march speed of 140 steps in a minute, while a standard pace for a quick march is 120 beats per minute with a 30-inch step. The regiment has won the best marching contingent twice at the Republic Day parade. On the occasion of the 221st Bastille day celebrations, a unit from the Maratha Light Infantry led the parade on the Parisian boulevard of Champs-Élysées on 14 July 2009, when the then Indian Prime Minister Manmohan Singh was the guest of honour of the ceremony.

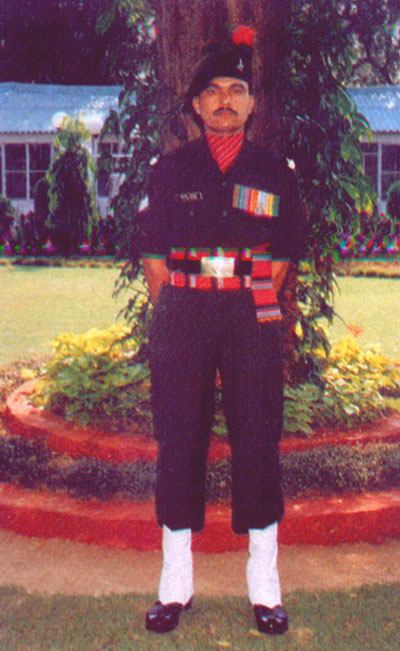
A Jawan of 14 Maratha Light Infantry

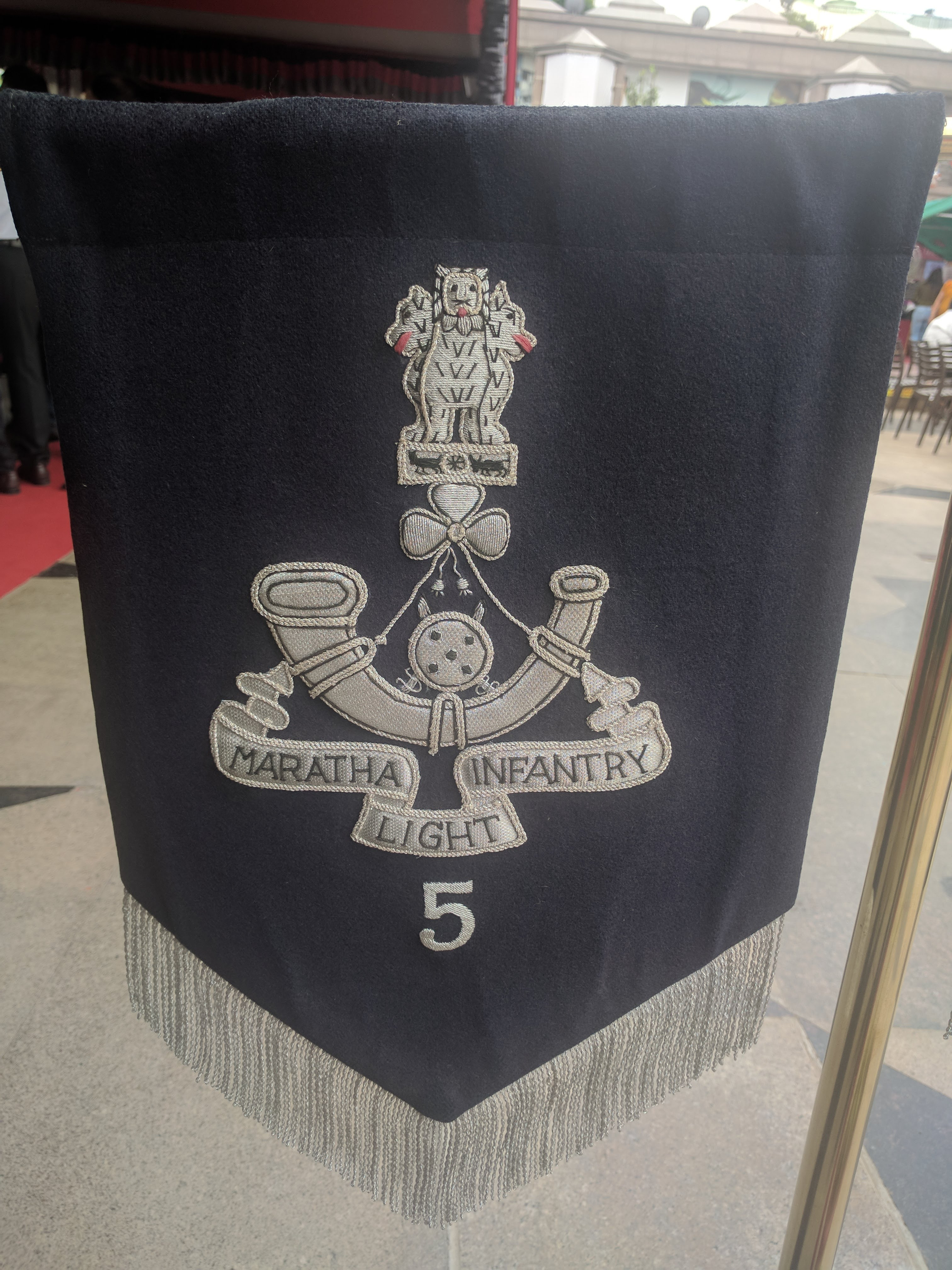
Banner of the 5th battalion, Maratha Light Infantry

== Regimental insignia ==
The regimental insignia consists of a bugle and cords with a pair of crossed swords and a shield, mounted by the Lion Capital of Ashoka. The bugle represents the light infantry mode of combat by skirmishers, controlled by orders issued on the bugles.

== Uniform ==
The uniform consists of a green beret (common to all infantry units in India), which has the regimental crest and a red and green hackle. The two-coloured hackle has a history. During 1788, the Bombay Army was reorganised into the 1st and 2nd Brigades. Red plumes adorned the headgear of the 2nd Battalion of the 1st Brigade. The Marathas and the 1st Battalion of the Oxfordshire and Buckinghamshire Light Infantry fought alongside each other in the Mesopotamia war as part of the same brigade. The British Army Light Infantry regiments wore green hackles during this time. As a symbol of this association, the green portion was added to the red, thus forming the present red and green hackle. The working dress does not have the hackle. The Regiment initially had a unique lanyard around the neck with ends in both front pockets. This was changed to the standard lanyard in 2002. This green lanyard is worn on the left shoulder. The exception is the 5th Battalion of the regiment, which wears a blue lanyard on the right shoulder, as an honour for the title "Royal", for its outstanding operations in Mesopotamia in World War I. The rank epaulettes consist of the words MARATHI LI in capitals. In ceremonial dress, the regimental crest is present in addition to the regimental title.

== Regimental colours ==
Till the First World War, each unit had its own colours. In 1922, with the creation of the Maratha Group, the Red, Black, and Grey colours of the 114 Marathas (which became the Maratha Light Infantry Regimental Centre) were adopted as the regimental colours.

== Battle honours ==
The regiment has 56 battle honours to its credit, 14 predating the World War I and spanning wars in Afghanistan, China, Burma and British East Africa. The list of battle honours is evidence to the long history and valour of the regiment. Some of these honours have been declared repugnant after the independence of the country.

Pre-independence

- Mysore
- Seedaseer
- Seringapatam
- Beni Boo Alli
- Kahun
- Mooltan
- Goojerat
- Punjaub
- Central India
- China 1860–62
- Abyssinia
- Afghanistan 1879–80
- Burma 1885–87
- British East Africa 1901
- Basra
- Shaiba
- Ctesiphon
- Kut al Amara 1915
- N.W. Frontier, India 1914–15 '17
- Baghdad
- Megiddo
- Sharon
- Nablus
- Palestine 1918
- Sharqat
- Mesopotamia 1914–18
- Persia
- Afghanistan 1919
- Siege of Tobruk
- Sangro
- Tengnoupal
- Shangshak
- Gothic Line
- Ru-Wya
- Senio

Post-independence

- Naushera (1948)
- Jhangar (1948)
- Burki (1965)
- Hussainiwala (1965)
- Jamalpur (1971)
- Burj (1971)
- Suadih (1971)

== Gallantry awards ==
=== Pre-independence ===
1914–1921

Victoria Cross

- Naik Yeshwant Ghadge
- Sepoy Namdeo Jadav

Companion of the Order of the Bath

- Lieutenant Colonel Walter Henry Brown

Companion of the Most Distinguished Order of Saint Michael and Saint George

- Colonel George Stanley Frazer

Companion of the Order of the Indian Empire

- Lieutenant Colonel Arthur Holroyd Bridges, 116th Mahrattas
- Major Edward George Hall, 117th Mahrattas

Commander of the Most Excellent Order of the British Empire

- Lieutenant Colonel Charles Edmund Hunter Wintle, 114th Mahrattas
- Major Wilkinson Dent, 103rd Mahratta Light Infantry

Distinguished Service Order

- Lieutenant Colonel Charles Edmund Hunter Wintle, 114th Mahrattas
- Captain Arthur Irons Sargon, 114th Mahrattas
- Major Roger Cochrane Wilson, 114th Mahrattas
- Major James Ainsworth Yates, 103rd Mahratta Light Infantry
- Captain Wilkinson Dent, 103rd Mahratta Light Infantry
- Captain Hubert Winthrop Young, 116th Mahrattas
- Second Lieutenant Cyril Vincent Heron-Jones, 110th Mahratta Light Infantry

Military Cross

- Captain William Burgess Benton. 105th Mahratta Light Infantry
- Captain Kenneth Edward Cooper, 110th Mahratta Light Infantry
- Captain Charles Aubrey Pogson, 117th Mahrattas
- Captain Arthur Wilfred White, 117th Mahrattas
- Captain Douglas Kerr Joseph Chisholm, 114th, attd. 116th Mahrattas
- Second Lieutenant Cyril Vincent Heron-Jones, 110th Mahratta Light Infantry
- Jemadar Dattairao Khanvilkar, 110th Mahratta Light Infantry
- Subedar Dhanjirao Khanvilkar, 114th Mahrattas
- Jemadar Keshao Talekar, 114th Mahrattas
- Subedar Sakhram Powar, 114th Mahrattas
- Jemadar Sitaram Sellar, 117th Mahrattas

Order of British India

- Subedar Illiasdar Khan, Subedar Eshwant Rao Bhosle, Subedar Shaikh Abdul Kader, 103rd Mahratta Light Infantry
- Subedar Major Shaikh Yasin, 110th Mahratta Light Infantry
- Subedar Major Mahadeorao Khanvilkar, Subedar Shaikh Ahmed, Subedar Vishnu Narvekar, 114th Mahrattas
- Subedar Sakharam Rao Jagtap, Subedar Major Balwant Rao Sawant, Subedar Vittal Chande, 117th Mahrattas

Indian Order of Merit

- Subedar Chimaji Garud, Naik Dyanu Bhosle, Private Gopal Rao Mahamunka, 105th Mahratta Light Infantry
- Lance Naik Haider Beg, Lance Naik Bhan Savant, Lance Naik Sakaram More, Sepoy Hari Sawant, Sepoy Laxuman Joth, Subedar Ramchandra Hase, 110th Mahratta Light Infantry
- Subadar-Major Mahodeorao Khanvilkar, Subedar Ramchandar Bhosle, Company Havildar Major Manbarao Bhosle, Havildar Raghonath More, Havildar Shaijira Sinde, Naik Rahm Khan, 114th Mahrattas
- Private Raja Ram Barge, Private Dianu Shinde, Subedar Murari Sinde, Subedar Vishram Rao Chowan, 116th Mahrattas
- Havildar Jairam Dalvi, Havildar Vithu Kadam, Subedar-Major Balwant Rao Sawant, Subedar Mahadeorao Nalaode, Jemadar Yenkatrao Kadam, 117th Mahrattas

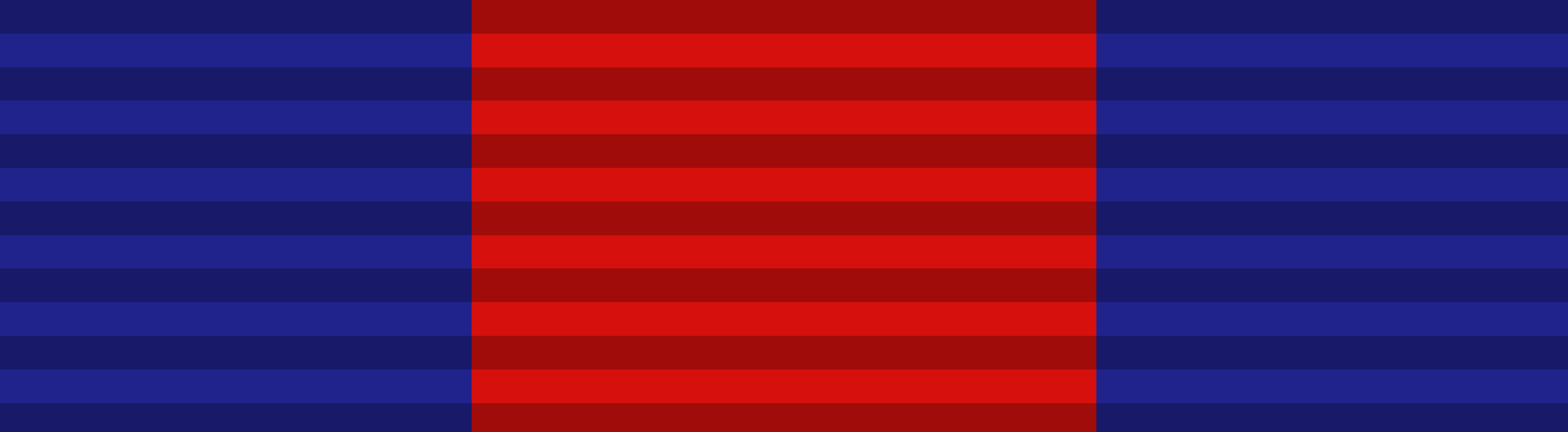
Indian Distinguished Service Medal

- World War I – 19 medals (103rd Mahratta Light Infantry), 8 medals (105th Mahratta Light Infantry), 9 medals (110th Mahratta Light Infantry), 15 medals (114th Mahrattas), 7 medals (116th Mahrattas), 18 (117th Mahrattas)

Indian Meritorious Service Medal

- World War I – 12 medals (103rd Mahratta Light Infantry), 46 medals (105th Mahratta Light Infantry), 9 medals (110th Mahratta Light Infantry), 5 medals (114th Mahrattas), 4 medals (116th Mahrattas), 7 (117th Mahrattas)

Croix De Guerre (French)

- Subedar and Honorary Lieutenant Bapurao Gaekwad, Subedar-Major Hyasdar Khan, 103rd Mahratta Light Infantry
- Subedar-Major Balwant Rao Sawant, Subedar-Major Mahadeorao Malande, 117th Mahrattas

Croix de guerre (Belgium)

- Lieutenant-Colonel Arthur Holroyd Bridges

Médaille militaire (French)

- Havildar Abajirao Kadam, 117th Mahrattas

Bronze medal for military valour (Italian)

- Sepoy Shaikh Adam, 114th Mahrattas

Order of Karageorge, 4th Class (with Swords)

- Major Percy Macclesfield Heath
- Captain Edward George Hall

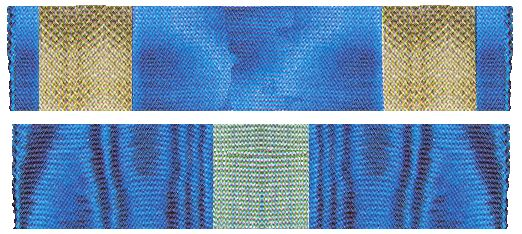
Officer of the Order of the Crown of Romania

- Captain Richard Outram Chamier, 110th Mahratta Light Infantry

Order of El Nahda, 3rd Class (Kingdom of Hejaz)

- Captain Hubert Winthrop Young, 116th Mahrattas

1922–1938

Companion of the Order of the Bath

- Colonel (temporary Colonel Commandant) Harry Ross, 1/103rd Mahratta Light Infantry & Commander, Rangoon Brigade Area, Southern Command, India.

Companion of the Order of the Indian Empire

- Lieutenant-Colonel Harry Ross, 1/103rd Mahratta Light Infantry

Commander of the Most Excellent Order of the British Empire

- Captain Douglas Stuart, 1/5th Mahratta Light Infantry

Officer of the Most Excellent Order of the British Empire

- Captain Herbert Hanna, 1/5th Mahratta Light Infantry

Member of the Most Excellent Order of the British Empire

- Captain Frank Howard Cotterill, 1/5th Mahratta Light Infantry
- Jemadar Raghunathrao Kadam, 110th Mahratta Light Infantry

Distinguished Service Order

- Lieutenant-Colonel Harry Ross, 1/103rd Mahratta Light Infantry
- Lieutenant-Colonel Geoffrey Noel Ford, 2nd battalion 5th Mahratta Light Infantry

Military Cross

- Lieutenant Edward Samuel Storey-Cooper, 114th Mahrattas
- Lieutenant Thomas Robson Waller, 2nd battalion 5th Mahratta Light Infantry

Albert Medal

- Captain George Hubert Bland, 105th Mahratta Light Infantry

1939–1947

Commander of the Most Excellent Order of the British Empire

- Brigadier DW Reid
- Brigadier (temporary) John Arthur Mellsop
- Brigadier (temporary) Ian Connail Anthos Lauder

Officer of the Most Excellent Order of the British Empire

- Colonel TH Boss
- Lieutenant-Colonel Arthur John Millard Wilton
- Lieutenant-Colonel (temp) Stephen Craine Goulden Bach

Member of the Most Excellent Order of the British Empire

- Major (temp.) Alfred Godfrey Hicks
- Captain (temp.) Dudley Owen Scolfield
- Captain (temp.) Ronald Ivor Webb

Distinguished Service Order

- Lieutenant Colonel DW Reid
- Lieutenant Colonel MP Lancaster
- Lieutenant-Colonel (temp.) Ian Connaill Athos Lauder
- Major AE Cocksedge
- Major (temporary) Paul Garbutt Unfreville Hardy
- Captain William Miller Mackay

Military Cross

- Major (temp) Nalinkumar Dhirrajlal Nanavati
- Major (temp) Richard Radcliffe
- Major (temp.) Paul Henderson Chase
- Major (temp.) Noel James Millington Pettengell
- Captain (temp. Major) Raymond Denis Teall
- Captain (temp. Major) James Robert Charles Lawrence
- Captain (temp. Major) Niall Vincent Holland
- Captain (temp. Major) William Miller Mackay
- Captain PMW Doyle
- Captain John Alan d'lssa-Boomgardt
- Captain AJ Oldham
- Captain Harold Stanley Richmond
- Lieutenant Padamsing Thapa
- Lieutenant Ashley Fletcher Story Wilson
- Lieutenant John Harford Powell
- Subedar Nanasahib Surve
- Subedar Shrirang Lawand
- Subedar Ganpatrao Patil
- Subedar Khandu Dalvi
- Subedar Ramchander Shinde
- Subedar Shripat Vishwasrao
- Subedar Mohammad Umar
- Subedar Dhakojirao Shinde
- Jemadar Laxuman Desai
- Jemadar Baburao Khanvilkar
- Jemadar Jairam Mahadik
- Jemadar Eknath Kaple
- Jemadar Sitaram Maske
- Jemadar Tukaram Parab

Indian Order of Merit

- Subedar Major Raojirao Shinde, Subedar Vishwamber Ghadge, Jemadar Sakaram Shinde, Havildar Maruti Chawan, Havildar Pandurang Kadam, Havildar Venkat Chawan, Naik Vishnu Mane, Naik Rajaram Sawant, Naik Dyanu Chawan, Sepoy Pandurang Powar, Babu Gaikwad, Lance-Naik Shivram Shinde, Sepoy Pandurang Tawde, Havildar Jaising Sawant, Naik Vithoba Jadhao, Jemadar Videy Prakash Misra, Sepoy Babaji Desai, Jemadar Sakharan Shinde

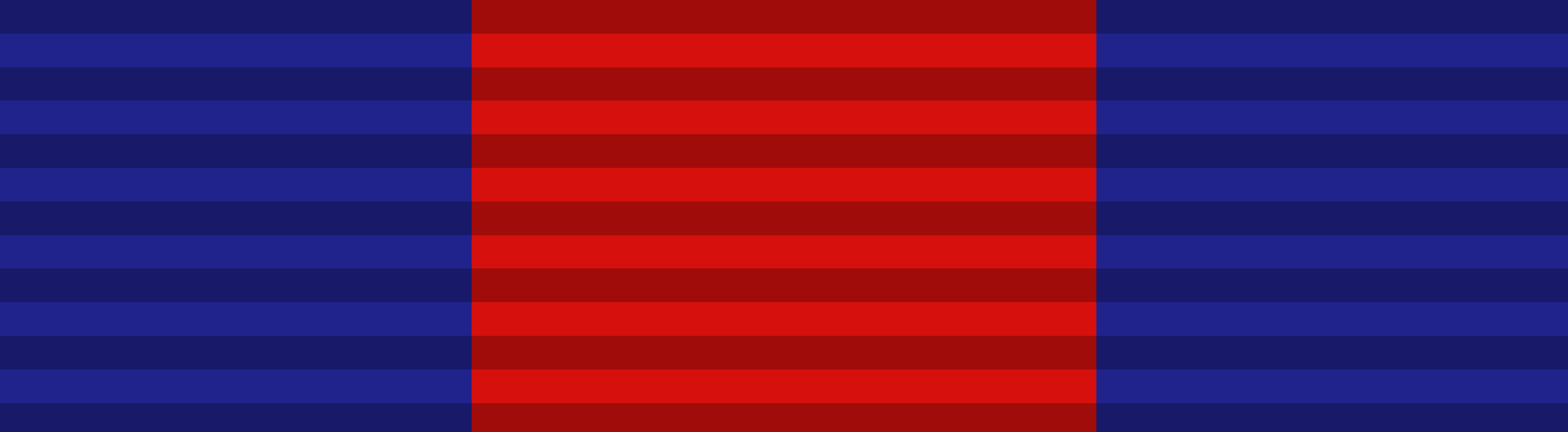
Indian Distinguished Service Medal

- Subedar Pandurang Chauhan, Naik Bala Kharade, Naik Sibaram Mhaske, Naik Baba Sahib Ingle, Sepoy Babu Desai, Sepoy Laku Jadhao, Havildar Bapu Jadhao, Havildar Baji Nalaode, Havildar Narayan Shirole, Havildar Narayan Naikwade, Havildar Ganpat Chawan, Havildar Yeshwant Jadhao, Havildar Maruti More, Naik Narayan Surwase, Lance-Naik Sidu Jadhao, Lance-Naik Maruti Shinde, Lance-Naik Dawlat Powar, Lance-Naik Vishnu Kohate, Sepoy Balu Powar, Sepoy Haibati Sawant, Sepoy Maruti Falke, Havildar Raj Aram Ghag, Lance-Havildar Ganesh Naik, Naik Balu Nikam, Lance-Naik Krishna Jagtap, Lance-Naik Newarti Nimbalkar, Company Havildar-Major Ganpat Bhosle, Naik Wastjdeo Sawant, Havildar Ganpat Kale, Lance-Naik Narayan Shinde, Sepoy Haibat Jadhao, Lance-Havildar Tukaram Jadhaol, Naik Krishna Shellar, Havildar Shankar Fartare, Havildar Daji Jadbao, Naik Laxuman Shinde

Military Medal

- Havildar Laxuman Sattam, Lance-Havildar Yeshwant Mane, Naik Ganpat Bhise, Naik Raghunath Salunke, Naik Yesu Jadhao, Lance-Havildar Dyanu Bhosle, Naik Ramchandra Ghadge, Lance-Naik Sitaram Jadhao, Naik Krishna Yururker, Lance-Naik Eshwara Kadam, Lance-Naik Krishna Mohite, Sepoy Jagu Autade, Sepoy Jaisingh More, Sepoy Kashiram Chawan, Sepoy Vishru Bhosle, Havildar Parshram Powar, Naik Jairam More, Naik Nathu Dhanaode, Naik Tukaram Chawan, Lance-Naik Keshao Surve, Sepoy Ramu Powar, Company Havildar-Major Baba Nikam, Naik Hari Kadam, Lance-Naik Krishna Sawant, Naik Parsuram Kadam, Naik Radhu Waman, Lance-Naik Chimaji More, Lance-Naik Govind Chawan, Lance-Naik Soma Mahajik, Sepoy Tukaram Nalawde, Naik Govind Dalvi, Naik Narayan Parab, Lance-Naik Dhanaji Khanvilikar, Sepoy Babu More, Sepoy Ramchandra Jadhao, Sepoy Shankar Sagwekar, Naik Dyanu Nale, Naik Tukaram Shedge, Sepoy Shripat Chaugule, Lance-Naik Pandurang Jadhao, Sepoy Nana More, Sepoy Shankar Borde, Sepoy Tatya Bhosle, Sepoy Genu Mate, Havildar Ganpatrao Tawde
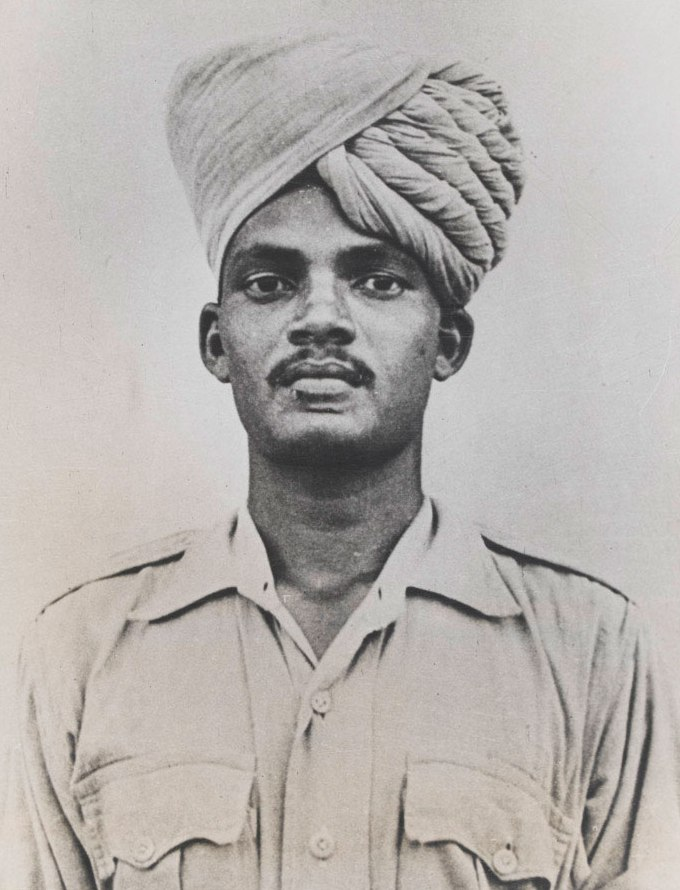
Naik Yeshwant Ghadge was awarded a Victoria Cross posthumously for heroic actions in Upper Tiber Valley, Italy, on 10 July 1944

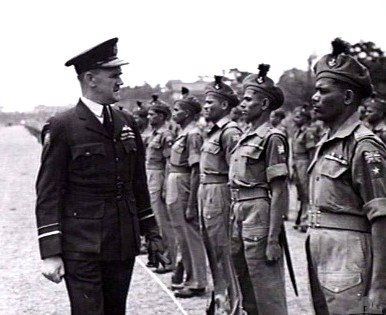
Sepoy Namdeo Jadav was awarded a Victoria Cross for heroic actions at Senio River, Italy, on 9 April 1945

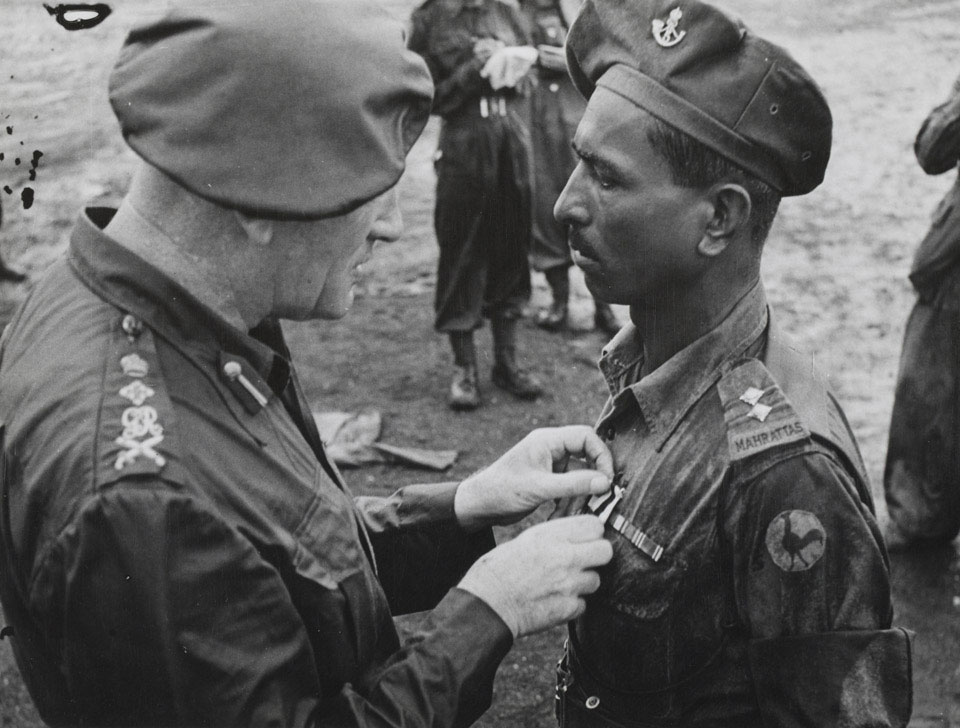
Subadar Ganpat Patil receives the Military Cross from General Sir Claude Auchinleck, 1944

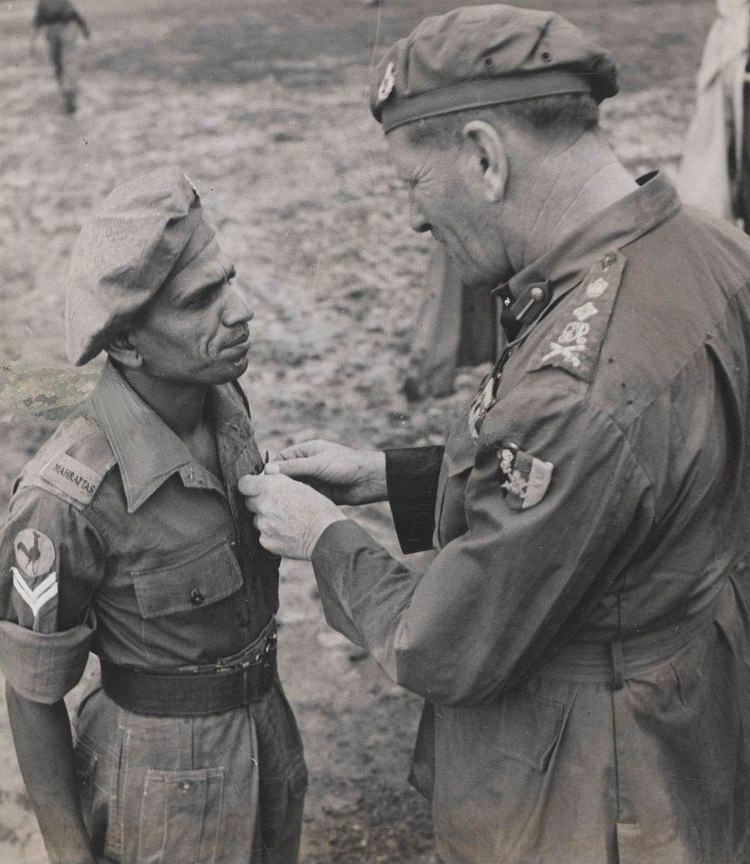
Naik Narayan Sinde receives the Indian Distinguished Service Medal from General Sir Claude Auchinleck, 1945

=== Post-independence ===
Ashok Chakra

- Captain Eric James Tucker – 2nd Battalion
- Colonel Neelakantan Jayachandran Nair – 16th Battalion
- Colonel Vasanth Venugopal – 9th Battalion
- Lieutenant Navdeep Singh – 15th Battalion

Maha Vir Chakra

- Lieutenant Colonel Harbans Singh Virk – 3rd (Para) Battalion
- Major Annavi Krishnaswamy Ramaswamy – 3rd (Para) Battalion
- Major Satyapal Chopra – 3rd (Para) Battalion
- Sepoy Pandurang Salunkhe – 15th Battalion

Kirti Chakra

- Major Neelakantan Jayachandran Nair– 16th Battalion
- Major Amit Oscar Fernandes – 7th Battalion
- Captain Abhinav Handa – 9th Battalion
- Second Lieutenant Rishi Ashok Malhotra – 8th Battalion
- Company Havildar Major Jagtap Shivaji Balu – 6th Battalion
- Havildar Rale Santosh Tanaji – 56 Rashtriya Rifles
- Lance Naik Pandit Mane – 2nd Battalion

== Notable officers ==
Chief of Army Staff

- General Joginder Jaswant Singh PVSM, AVSM, VSM, ADC – 21st Chief of Army Staff

Vice Chief of Army Staff

- Lieutenant General Vijay Oberoi PVSM, AVSM, VSM – Vice Chief of the Army Staff, former founder President of the War Wounded Foundation.

Army Commanders

- Lieutenant General T B Henderson Brooks PVSM – General Officer Commanding-in-Chief Eastern Command
- Lieutenant General Kuldip Singh Brar PVSM, AVSM, VrC – GOC of 9th Infantry Division led Operation Bluestar. He retired as the General Officer Commanding-in-Chief Eastern Command.
- Lieutenant General Krishnamurthy Nagaraj PVSM, UYSM, ADC – General Officer Commanding-in-Chief, South-Western Command and Army Training Command
- Lieutenant General Hari Prasad PVSM, UYSM, AVSM, VSM – General Officer Commanding-in-Chief Northern Command
- Lieutenant General HRS Kalkat PVSM, AVSM, ADC – General Officer Commanding-in-Chief Eastern Command

Others

- Lieutenant General MA Zaki PVSM, AVSM, VrC – Commanded 15 Corps, was Director General Infantry and later acted as the advisor to the Governor of Jammu and Kashmir.
- Lieutenant General DB Shekhatkar PVSM, AVSM, VSM – General Officer Commanding 4 Corps, Additional Director General of Military operations and Director General of Perspective (Strategic) planning. Was chairman of the committee to recommend measures to enhance combat capability and rebalance defence expenditure of the armed forces.
- Lieutenant General Satish Nambiar VrC – Director General of Military Operations and first Force Commander and Head of Mission of UNPROFOR, Deputy Chief of the Army Staff (Training and Coordination)
- Lieutenant General Narendra Singh PVSM, AVSM, SM, VSM – Deputy Chief of the Army Staff (Planning and Systems)
- Lieutenant General DS Thakur – Director General Military Intelligence and Deputy Chief of the Army Staff.
- Lieutenant General Harinder Singh PVSM, AVSM, YSM, SM, VSM – GOC 14 Corps and Commandant of Indian Military Academy.
- Lieutenant General Ashok Ambre PVSM, AVSM**, SM – Quarter Master General
- Lieutenant General Satish Satpute PVSM, AVSM – General Officer Commanding 21 Corps
- Lieutenant General PR Gangadharan PVSM, AVSM, VSM** – General Officer Commanding 12 Corps and Military Secretary
- Lieutenant General Dushyant Singh PVSM, AVSM – General Officer Commanding 11 Corps
- Lieutenant General J S Dhillon – General Officer Commanding 15 Corps
- Lieutenant General Parminder Jit Singh Pannu PVSM, AVSM, VSM – General Officer Commanding 14 Corps, Director General Infantry, Deputy Chief of Integrated Defence Staff (Operations).
- Lieutenant General Asit Mistry PVSM, AVSM, SM, VSM – Commandant of National Defence Academy, Khadakwasla
- Lieutenant General TPS Brar YSM – General Officer Commanding 16 Corps
- Lieutenant General Gopal Krishan Duggal PVSM, VrC – General Officer Commanding 10 Corps
- Major General DS Brar OBE – Colonel Commandant of the Regiment
- Major General Eustace D'Souza PVSM – Colonel Commandant of the Regiment
- Major General H W Kulkarni – Colonel Commandant of the Regiment
- Major General Bachitar Singh PVSM – Colonel Commandant of the Regiment
- Brigadier Saurabh Singh Shekhawat KC, SC, SM, VSM – avid mountaineer and one of the most decorated officers of the Indian Army.
- Captain C. P. Krishnan Nair – founder of The Leela Group.
- Major Nana Patekar – Actor, who was part of Indian Territorial Army

== Sporting achievements ==
- Major Shantaram Jadhav, Subedar Shankar Laxman and Naik Vishwas Patil were part of the Indian hockey squad to the 1960 Rome Olympics in.
- Colonel HS Chauhan is a veteran in the field of mountaineering, was awarded the Tenzing Norgay National Adventure Award, went on to become Principal of Himalayan Mountaineering Institute and became President of the Indian Mountaineering Foundation.
- The following have represented the country/services team in wrestling – Naib Subedar Shivaji Kekan, Naib Subedar Ashok Shirke, Naib Subedar Maruti Ghadi, Subedar Major Vasant Solankar, Subedar Major/Hony. Captain Shivaji Chingle, Subedar Major/Hony Capt Raghunath Pawar, Lance Naik Dudhappa Asudekar, Naik Yellappa Pote, Naib Subedar Ashok Shirke, Havildar Krishna Patil, Sepoy Prashant Jamnik.
- Havildar Keshav More was the National Boxing Champion between 1962 and 1963.
- Shooting – Subedar Shivaji Lavate, Havildar Begaram, Havildar BR Patil, Havildar Sanjay More.

== Gallery ==
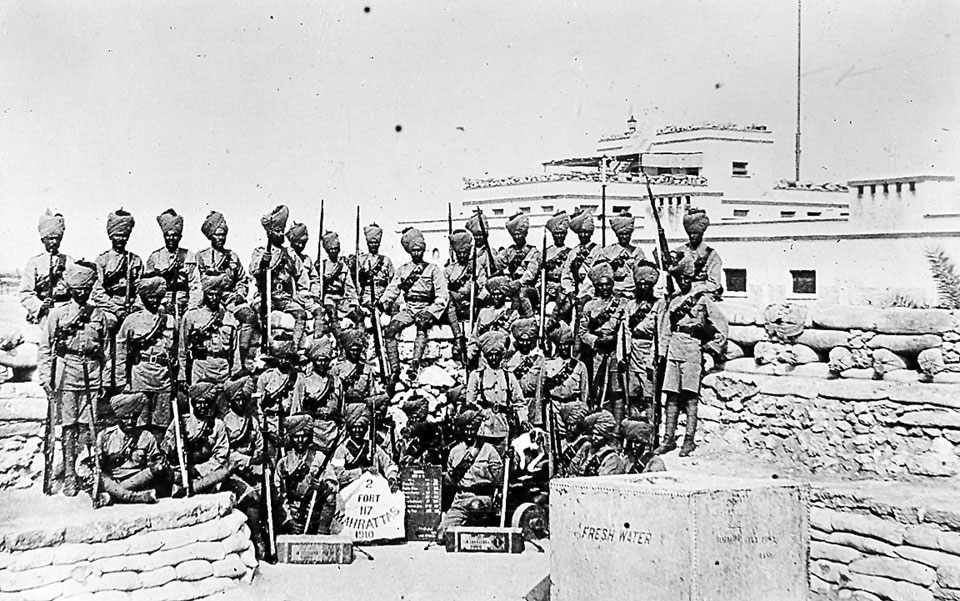
117th Mahrattas at a fort in the North West Frontier, India, 1909

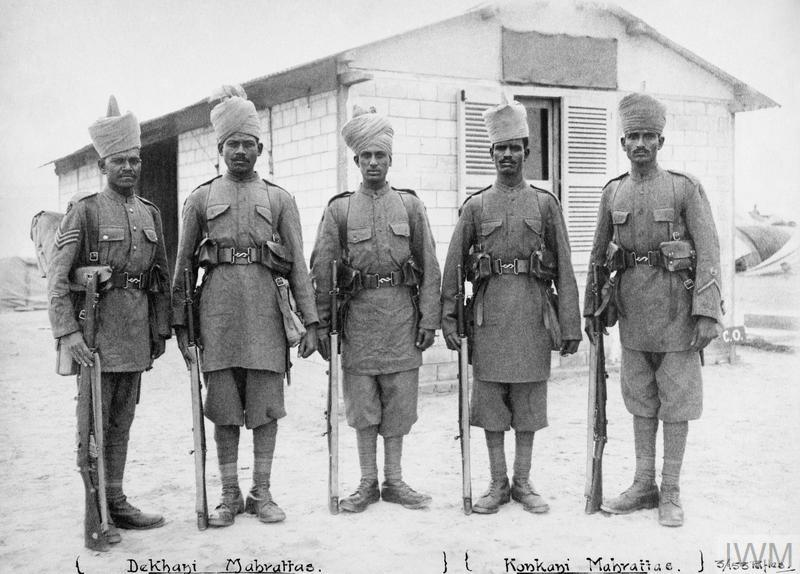
Dekhani and Konkani Mahrattas, World War I

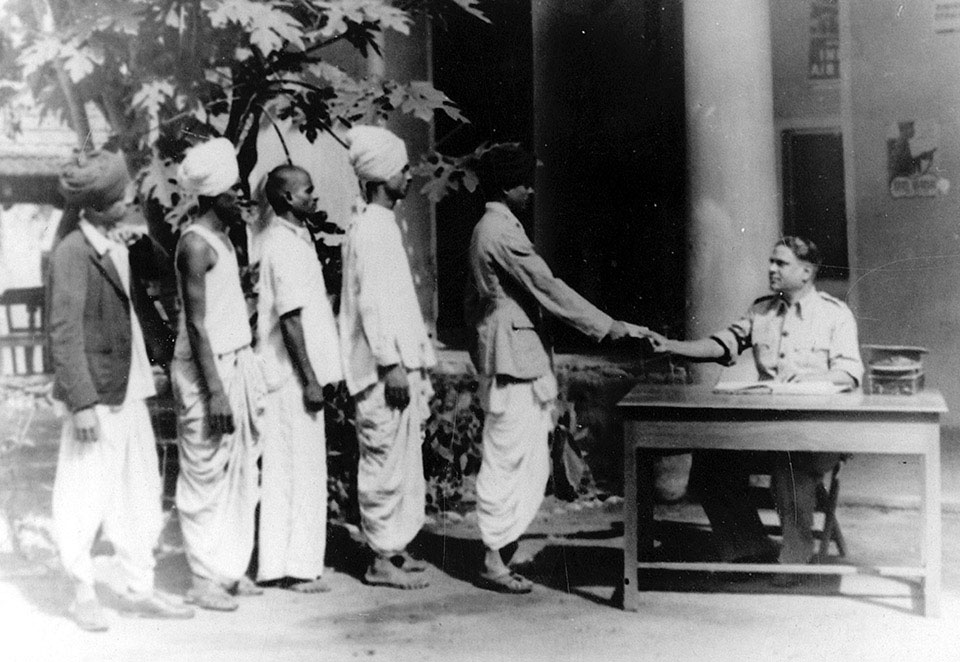
Recruits line up to enlist with the 5th Mahratta Light Infantry, 1943

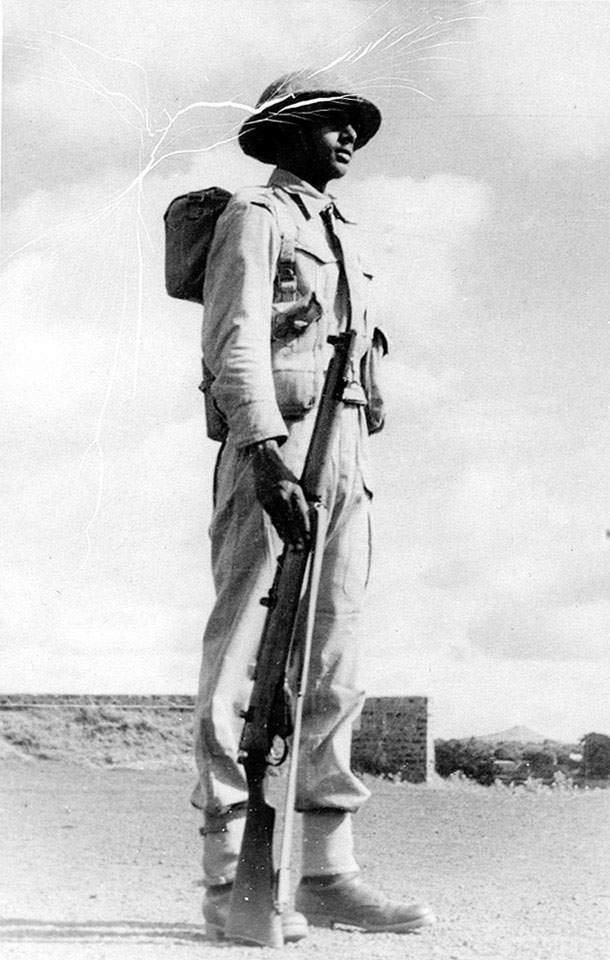
A soldier of the 5th Mahratta Light Infantry, 1943

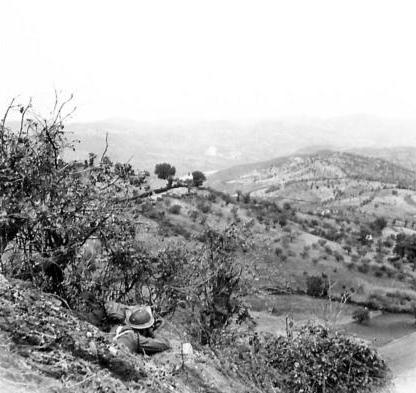
Mahratta sniper on south bank of Trigno, 1943

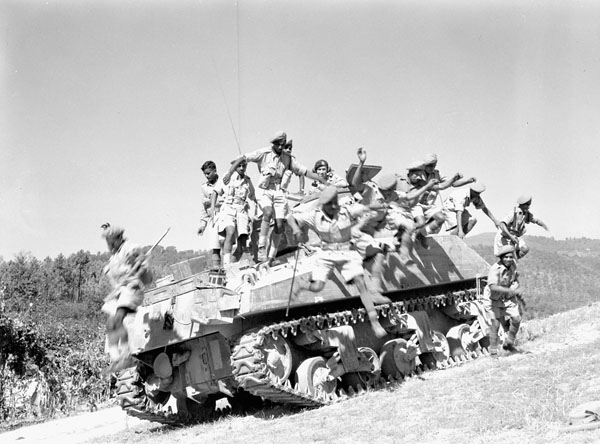
1/5th Mahratta Light Infantry train in Florence, 1944

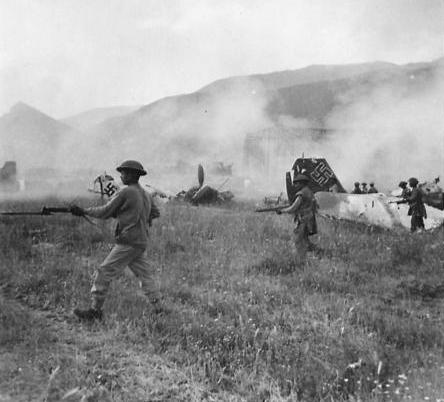
1/5th Mahratta Light Infantry advance across Aquino aerodrome, 1944

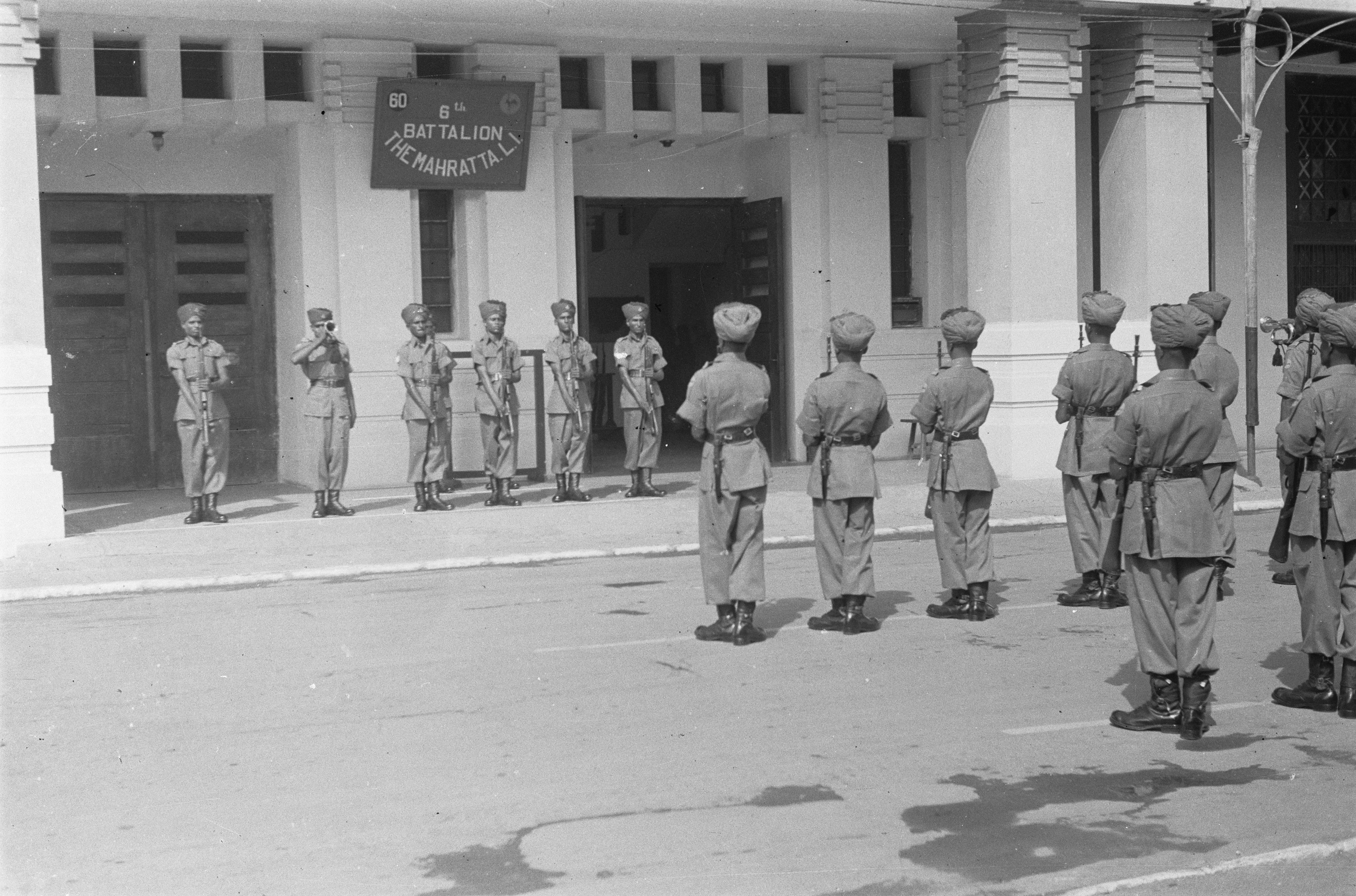
6th Battalion Mahratta Light Infantry in Jakarta, 1946

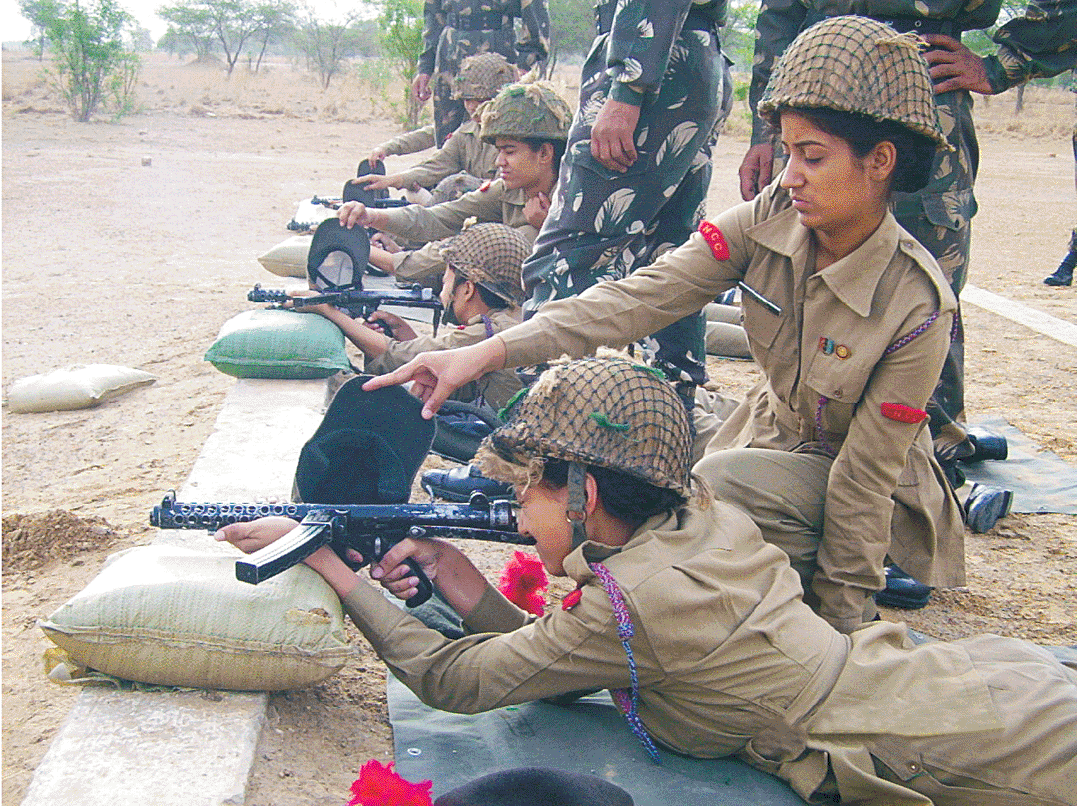
14th Battalion Maratha Light Infantry conduct range training for NCC cadets of Gwalior Division

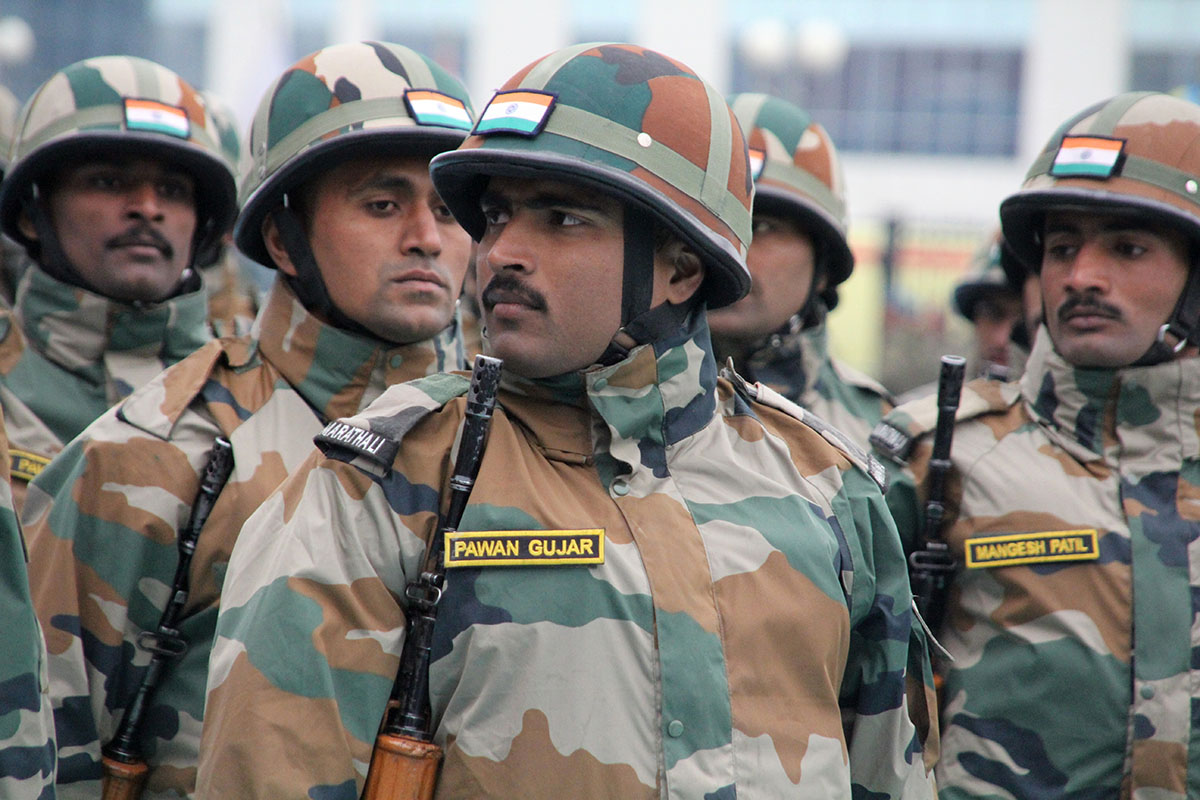
Indian Army soldiers of the Maratha Light Infantry during closing ceremony of Indra 2017 military exercise.

== See also ==
- List of regiments of the Indian Army
