= 110th Mahratta Light Infantry =

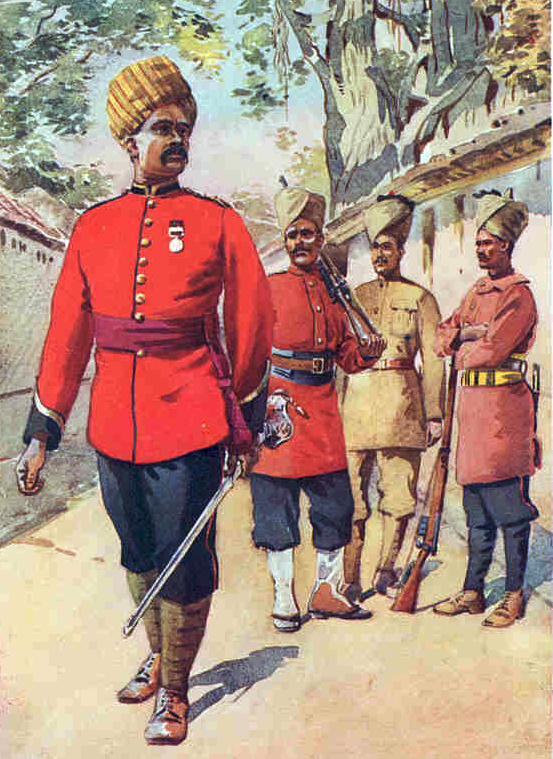
- Soldier of the regiment (second from left) with other Mahratta Infantry, painted in 1911.
- Active: 1797–1922
- Country: British India
- Branch: British Indian Army
- Type: Infantry
- Part of: Bombay Army (to 1895); Bombay Command
- Colors: Red; faced black
- Engagements: Third Anglo-Mysore War; Fourth Anglo-Mysore War; Beni Boo Ali campaign First Anglo-Afghan War; Second Anglo-Sikh War; Second Opium War; Second Anglo-Afghan War; Second Anglo-Burmese War; World War I

The 110th Mahratta Light Infantry were an infantry regiment of the British Indian Army. The regiment traces their origins to 1797, when they were raised as the 2nd Battalion, 5th (Travancore) Regiment of Bombay Native Infantry.

The regiments first saw action during the Mysore wars being involved on the Third Anglo-Mysore War and the Battle of Seedaseer and the Battle of Seringapatam in the Fourth Anglo-Mysore War. They were then used in the punitive expedition in the Beni Boo Ali campaign in 1821, against the pirates in Eastern Arabia and the Persian Gulf. The regiment was involved in the Siege of Kahun next during the First Afghan War. The annexation of the Punjab was next during the Second Anglo-Sikh War. Their next action was in China in the Second Opium War. They returned to Afghanistan again to participate in the Second Afghan War; their last conflict in the 19th century was the annexation of Burma in the Second Burmese War. In World War I the regiment was attached to the 6th (Poona) Division in the Mesopotamian campaign. After a string of earlier successes, the 6th Division was delivered a setback at the Battle of Ctesiphon and forced to withdraw back to Kut. The Siege of Kut began and after a lengthy siege surrendered in April 1916.

After World War I the Indian government reformed the army moving from single battalion regiments to multibattalion regiments. In 1922, the 110th Mahratta Light Infantry became the 3rd Battalion 5th Mahratta Light Infantry. After independence they were one of the regiments allocated to the Indian Army.

== Predecessor names ==
- 2nd Battalion, 5th (Travancore) Regiment of Bombay Native Infantry - 1797
- 10th Bombay Native Infantry - 1818
- 10th Bombay Native (Light) Infantry - 1871
- 10th Regiment of Bombay (Light) Infantry - 1885
- 10th Bombay Light Infantry - 1901
- 10th Mahratta Light Infantry

== Sources ==
- Barthorp, Michael; Burn, Jeffrey (1979). Indian infantry regiments 1860-1914. Osprey Publishing. ISBN 0-85045-307-0.
- Rinaldi, Richard A (2008). Order of Battle British Army 1914. Ravi Rikhye. ISBN 978-0-9776072-8-0.
- Sharma, Gautam (1990). Valour and sacrifice: famous regiments of the Indian Army. Allied Publishers. ISBN 81-7023-140-X.
- Sumner, Ian (2001). The Indian Army 1914-1947. Osprey Publishing. ISBN 1-84176-196-6.
- Moberly, Frederick James (1927) [1923]. The Campaign in Mesopotamia 1914–1918. History of the Great War Based on Official Documents. Vol. I. London: HMSO. OCLC 772784341.
