= 103rd Mahratta Light Infantry =

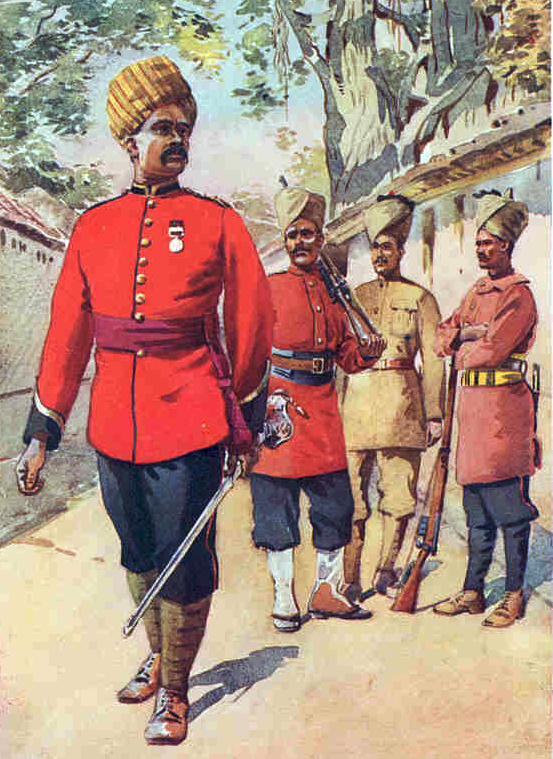
- A subadar of the regiment (far left) with other Mahratta Infantry, painted in 1911.
- Active: 1768–1922
- Country: British India
- Allegiance: British Indian Army
- Branch: Army
- Type: Infantry
- Part of: Bombay Army (to 1895); Bombay Command
- Uniform: Red; faced sky-blue, 1888 blue 1895 black
- Engagements: French Revolutionary Wars; Third Anglo-Mysore War; Fourth Anglo-Mysore War; Beni Boo Ali; Second Anglo-Sikh War; 1868 Expedition to Abyssinia; Second Afghan War; World War I

The 103rd Mahratta Light Infantry were an infantry regiment of the British Indian Army. They could trace their origins to 1768, when they were raised as the 2nd Battalion, Bombay Sepoys. The regiment was first in action in the Mysore Campaign during the Third Anglo-Mysore War, quickly followed by the Battle of Seedaseer and the Battle of Seringapatam in the Fourth Anglo-Mysore War. Their next action was at Beni Boo Ali against pirates in Eastern Arabia and the Persian Gulf region led the East India Company to carry out a punitive expedition in 1819 to Ras al Khaimah which destroyed the pirate base and removed the threat from the Persian Gulf.

In 1848, the regiment took part in the Siege of Multan and the Battle of Gujrat in the Second Anglo-Sikh War. The 1868 Expedition to Abyssinia was next for the regiment. This was a punitive expedition carried out by armed forces of the British Empire against the Emperor Tewodros II of Ethiopia, he had imprisoned several missionaries and two representatives of the British government. During World War I they took part in the Mesopotamia Campaign. With the 17th (Ahmednagar) Brigade they were at the Battle of Es Sinn. They were captured by the Turks with the 6th (Poona) Division after the Siege of Kut.

After World War I the Indian government reformed the army moving from single battalion regiments to multi battalion regiments. In 1922, the 103rd Mahratta Light Infantry became the 1st Battalion 5th Mahratta Light Infantry. After independence they were one of the regiments allocated to the Indian Army.

== Predecessor names ==
- 2nd Battalion, Bombay Sepoys – 1768.
- 1st Battalion, 2nd Regiment of Bombay Native Infantry – 1796.
- 3rd Regiment of Bombay Native Infantry – 1824.
- 3rd Regiment of Bombay (Light) Infantry – 1871.
- 3rd Bombay Light Infantry – 1901.
- 103rd Maharatta Light Infantry – 1903.
