= 105th Mahratta Light Infantry =

British Indian Army unit

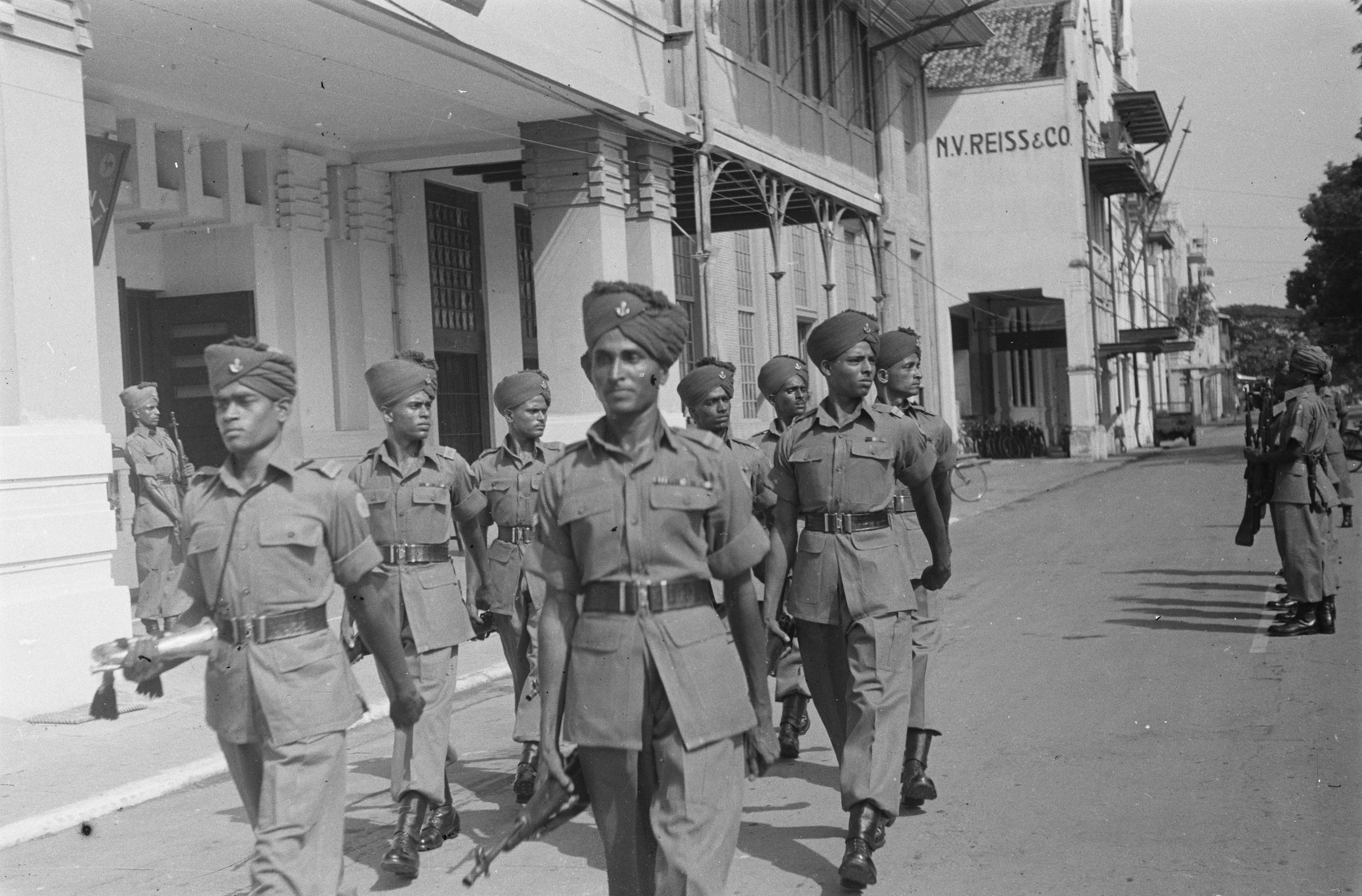
- 6th battalion of Mahratta Light Infantry
- Active: 1768—1922
- Country: British India
- Branch: Army
- Type: Infantry
- Part of: Bombay Army (to 1895); Bombay Command
- Uniform: Red; faced black
- Engagements: Third Anglo-Mysore War; Fourth Anglo-Mysore War; Beni Boo Ali; First Afghan War; Second Afghan War; Second Opium War; World War I

The 105th Mahratta Light Infantry were an infantry regiment of the British Indian Army. The regiment traces their origins to 1768, when they were raised as the 3rd Battalion, Bombay Sepoys.

The regiment's first action was during the Mysore Campaign in the Third Anglo-Mysore War. This campaign was followed by the Fourth Anglo-Mysore War, during which the regiment fought in both the major battles the Battle of Seedaseer and the Battle of Seringapatam. They were then used in the punitive expedition in the Beni Boo Ali campaign in 1821, against the pirates in Eastern Arabia and the Persian Gulf. The regiment was involved in the Siege of Kahun next during the First Afghan War. A detachment of 140 men held off the besieging force from May to September, before being forced to surrender. China was the regiments next destination during the Second Opium War. They were then part of the force used in the annexation of Burma during the Second Burmese War, this being their final action in the 19th century.

After World War I the Indian government reformed the army moving from single battalion regiments to multi battalion regiments. In 1922, the 105th Mahratta Light Infantry became the 2nd Battalion 5th Mahratta Light Infantry. After independence they were one of the regiments allocated to the Indian Army.

== Predecessor names ==
- 3rd Battalion, Bombay Sepoys - 1768
- 1st Battalion, 3rd Bombay Native Infantry - 1796
- 5th Bombay Native Infantry - 1824
- 5th Bombay Native (Light) Infantry - 1841
- 5th Bombay (Light) Infantry - 1885
- 5th Bombay Light Infantry - 1901
- 105th Mahratta Light Infantry - 1903
- 2nd Battalion the Maratha Light Infantry

== Sources ==
- Barthorp, Michael; Burn, Jeffrey (1979). Indian infantry regiments 1860-1914. Osprey Publishing. ISBN 0-85045-307-0.
- Rinaldi, Richard A (2008). Order of Battle British Army 1914. Ravi Rikhye. ISBN 978-0-9776072-8-0.
- Sharma, Gautam (1990). Valour and sacrifice: famous regiments of the Indian Army. Allied Publishers. ISBN 81-7023-140-X.
- Moberly, Frederick James (1927) [1923]. The Campaign in Mesopotamia 1914–1918. History of the Great War Based on Official Documents. Vol. I. London: HMSO. OCLC 772784341.
