= Mohammad Ahmed Zaki =

Indian Army general

Lieutenant General Mohammad Ahmed Zaki PVSM AVSM VrC
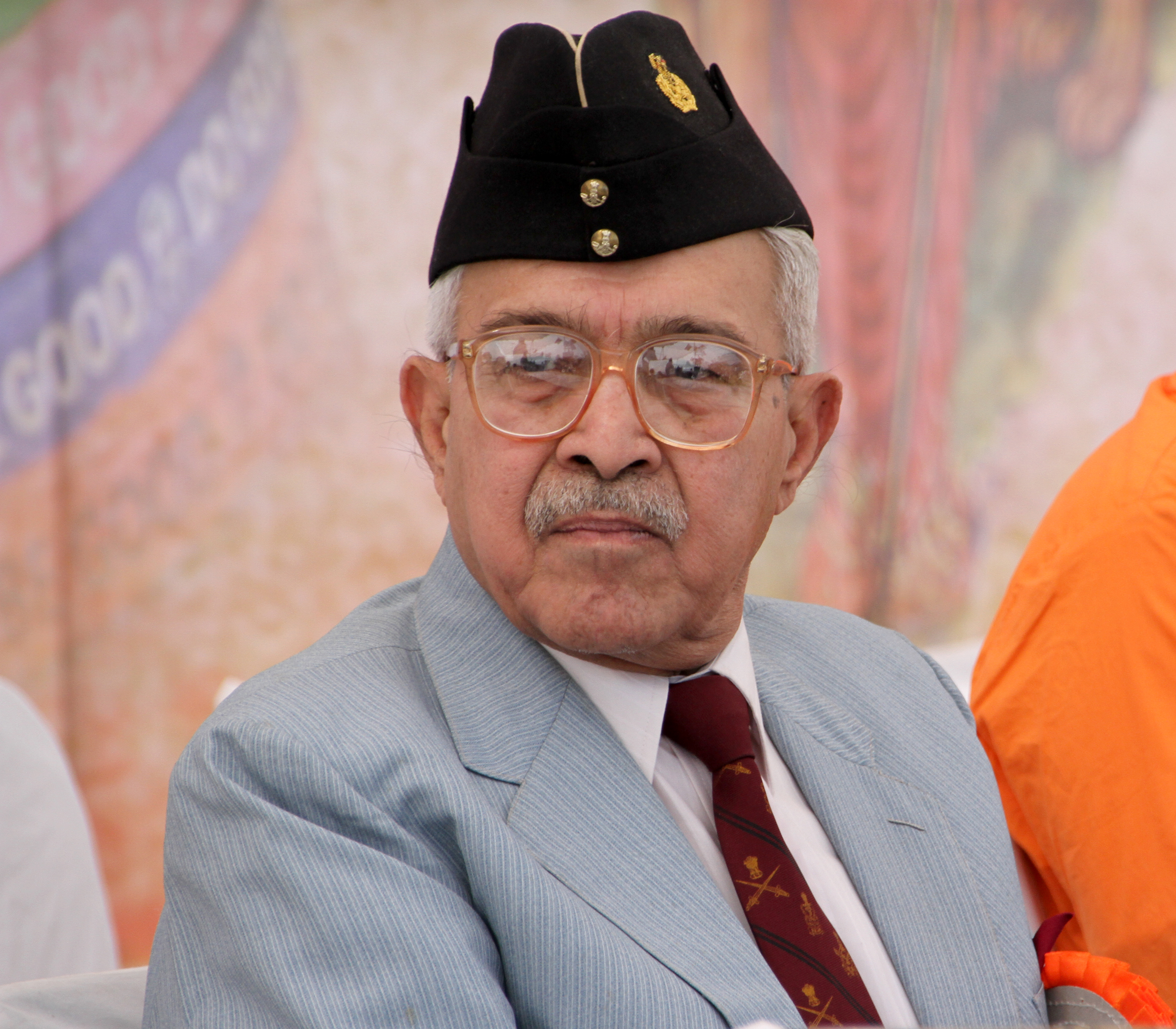
- Zaki in 2017
- Born: 20 January 1935 (age 91); Hyderabad, Hyderabad State, British Raj (present-day Telangana, India)
- Military career
- Allegiance: India
- Branch: Indian Army
- Service years: 1955–1993
- Rank: Lieutenant-General
- Service number: IC-7613H
- Unit: 19 Maratha LI
- Commands: Indian Military Academy; XV Corps; 19th Infantry Division; Telangana Area; Mizoram Range, Assam Rifles; 86th Infantry Brigade; 2 Maratha LI
- Conflicts: Indo-Pakistani War of 1965; Insurgency in Northeast India; Indo-Pakistani War of 1971
- Awards: Param Vishisht Seva Medal; Padma Shri; Ati Vishisht Seva Medal; Vir Chakra

Lieutenant General Mohammad Ahmed Zaki PVSM AVSM VrC (born 20 January 1935, Hyderabad, Telangana) is a former general officer of the Indian Army.

== Early life and education ==
Zaki was born into a Hyderabadi family with a long history of service in the Nizam's Army. His father was a retired Brigadier in the Nizam's Cavalry forces.

Zaki was educated at the Rashtriya Indian Military College in Dehra Dun from 1947 to 1951. He was selected for the National Defence Academy in 1952.

== Career ==
Upon being commissioned into the Indian Army, he joined the 19th Battalion of the Maratha Light Infantry in 1955.

=== Vir Chakra ===
In the Indo-Pakistani War of 1965, Zaki was wounded in the battle of Thatti Jaimal Singh and was awarded the Vir Chakra for a conspicuous display of gallantry in the face of the enemy:

Gazette Notification: 134 Pres/65,16-10-65

Operation: - Date of Award: 20 September 1965

CITATION

MAJOR MOHAMMAD AHMAD ZAKI (IC-7613)

19 BATTALION, THE MARATHA LIGHT INFANTRY

Major Mohammad Ahmad Zaki was in command of the leading assaulting company of his battalion near Thatti Jaimal Singh in the Lahore Sector. On 20 September 1965, his company came under heavy medium machine gun, rifle and Browning fire and he was injured in the shoulder and arm by a burst of medium machine gun fire. Still he led a determined assault on the enemy He was wounded again. Undaunted by his successive injuries, he drove home the assault in what was virtually hand-to hand fighting. With a hand grenade he himself destroyed an enemy bunker containing a medium machine gun. At this stage he fell exhausted due to profuse bleeding, but inspired by his determined efforts, his company annihilated the enemy and captured the objective. In this battle, Major Zaki showed inspiring leadership, courage and dedication to duty, in the highest traditions of the Indian Army.

=== Post-war career ===
During the Indo-Pakistani War of 1971, he was in command of the 2nd Battalion of the Maratha Light Infantry (Kali Panchvin) in the Shakargarh area. He has held many important appointments such as instructor at the Infantry School in Mhow, Brigade Major in Ladakh and instructor at the Defence Services Staff College in Wellington Cantonment.

In March 1976, he raised the 18th Battalion of the Maratha Light Infantry. He was promoted to the rank of Brigadier and took over the command of the 86th Infantry Brigade in Punjab. From 1984 to 1985, he was DIG Mizoram Range (Assam Rifles).

=== General officer ===
Zaki was awarded the Ati Vishisht Seva Medal and promoted to the rank of Major General. In August 1985, he assumed command of the Telangana, Tamil Nadu, Karnataka, Kerala and Goa area. Later, he was posted as General officer commanding 19 Infantry Division in Jammu and Kashmir from 1986 to 1987.

Further elevated to the rank of Lieutenant General in 1988, he took over as Director General Infantry. He was corps commander of the Chinar Corps in Srinagar when there was an outbreak of insurgency in Kashmir. Zaki was awarded the Param Vishisht Seva Medal in 1991. He took over as Commandant of the Indian Military Academy in Dehra Dun in June 1991. After that, he was appointed an advisor to the Governor of Jammu and Kashmir. He retired from the Indian Army on 31 January 1993, after nearly 38 years of service. He then had a second stint as advisor to the Governor of Jammu and Kashmir from 1993 to 1995. General Zaki was awarded the Padma Shri by the Government of India in 2001 for his services to the nation.

== Honours and decorations ==

Param Vishisht Seva Medal	Padma Shri	Ati Vishisht Seva Medal	Vir Chakra
Wound Medal	Samanya Seva Medal	Special Service Medal	Paschimi Star
Raksha Medal	Sangram Medal	Sainya Seva Medal	Videsh Seva Medal
25th Anniversary of Independence Medal	30 Years Long Service Medal	20 Years Long Service Medal	9 Years Long Service Medal

== Vice Chancellor in Jamia Millia Islamia ==
Post retirement from India Army, Gen Zaki served as Vice Chancellor of Jamia Millia Islamia from 1997 to 2000.

== Dates of rank ==
Insignia	Rank	Component	Date of rank
	Second Lieutenant	Indian Army	11 December 1955
	Lieutenant	Indian Army	
	Captain	Indian Army	
	Major	Indian Army	11 December 1968
	Lieutenant-Colonel	Indian Army	5 April 1974
	Colonel	Indian Army	
	Brigadier	Indian Army	20 October 1982
	Major General	Indian Army	16 August 1985
	Lieutenant General	Indian Army	

== See also ==
- Golconda
- History of Hyderabad
- Hyderabadi Muslims
- Hyderabad State
- Muslim culture of Hyderabad
