= 5th Bombay Native Infantry =

5th Bombay Native Infantry may refer to:

- 102nd Prince of Wales's Own Grenadiers which was called the 5th Bombay Native Infantry in 1787
- 105th Mahratta Light Infantry which was called the 5th Bombay Native Infantry in 1824
