= Vasanth Venugopal =

Decorated Indian Military officer (1967–2007)

Colonel Vasanth Venugopal AC
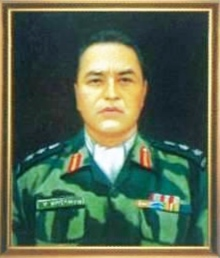
- Portrait of Col Vasanth Venugopal
- Born: 25 March 1967; Bengaluru, Karnataka, India
- Died: 31 July 2007 (aged 40); Jammu and Kashmir, India
- Spouse: Subhashini Vasanth
- Children: Rukmini Vasanth
- Military career
- Allegiance: India
- Branch: Indian Army
- Service years: 1989-2007
- Rank: Colonel
- Service number: IC-48714L
- Unit: Maratha LI
- Commands: 9 Maratha LI
- Awards: Ashoka Chakra (posthumous)

Colonel Vasanth Venugopal, AC (25 March 1967 – 31 July 2007) was an Indian Army officer. He was the commanding officer of the 9th battalion, Maratha Light Infantry. On 31 July 2007, he was killed while fighting and preventing heavily armed Pakistani terrorists from crossing the India-Pakistan border at Uri, Jammu and Kashmir, India. As a result he was posthumously awarded the Ashoka Chakra, India's highest military decoration for peacetime gallantry.

== Early life ==
Born to Praphulla and N.K. Venugopal in Bangalore, Karnataka, India, Vasanth Venugopal was the youngest of two brothers. His father's work required the family to travel throughout the state of Karnataka and Vasanth went to schools in Udupi, Shimoga and Bangalore. He graduated from MES College, Bangalore in 1988. While in college, he was a member of the National Cadet Corps, through which he participated in the Indo-Canada World Youth Exchange Programme of 1986-87.

== Military career ==
Venugopal started training at the Indian Military Academy, Dehradun in 1988. On 10 June 1989, he was commissioned into the 9th battalion of the Maratha Light Infantry as a second lieutenant. He was promoted lieutenant on 10 June 1991 and to captain on 10 June 1994. On 14 January 2000, Venugopal was promoted major, and was promoted lieutenant-colonel on 16 December 2004. In a military career spanning eighteen years, he served in Pathankot, Sikkim, Gandhinagar, Ranchi, Bangalore and various sectors of Jammu and Kashmir.

"I go where my men go", he told his mother when she asked him if a colonel should participate in all operations conducted by his men. On 28 October 2006 he took over as the commanding officer of the 9th battalion, Maratha Light Infantry. The battalion was at that time posted in Uri, Jammu and Kashmir.

On 31 July 2007, he and his troops surrounded Pakistani terrorists in a forest and blocked all their escape routes in the Uri sector in Kashmir. Despite being wounded, the colonel and his men engaged the terrorists in a fierce encounter. The daring officer led from the front and helped gun down the terrorists. He and radio operator L/Nk Bachhav Shashikant Ganpat were shot and died in hospital. "He ensured that all eight Pakistani terrorists were wiped out even as he laid down his life for the nation. He was a true soldier who was dedicated to the country and his force", Gen. Joginder Jaswant Singh, Chief of Army Staff at the time, said after Venugopal's death.

== Honours and legacy ==
Col. Venugopal was cremated with full military honours on 1 August 2007 in Bangalore.

He was posthumously awarded the Ashoka Chakra, India's highest peacetime military decoration for gallantry awarded for the "most conspicuous bravery or some daring or pre-eminent valour or self-sacrifice" other than in the face of the enemy. Colonel Vasanth is the first person from the state of Karnataka, India to have received this honour.

Venugopal's biography Forever Forty, written by his wife Subhashini Vasanth and Veena Prasad was released by Gen. Joginder Jaswant Singh and Santosh Hegde on 10 July 2011 at Crossword Bookstore, Bangalore.

His daughter Rukmini Vasanth is an actress.
