= 36 Medium Regiment (India) =

Indian Army artillery unit

- Active: 1940 – present
- Country: India
- Allegiance: British India; India
- Branch: British Indian Army; Indian Army
- Type: Artillery
- Size: Regiment
- Nickname(s): The Chhattis
- Motto(s): SARVATRA, IZZAT-O-IQBAL “Everywhere With Honour and Glory”.
- Colors: "Red & Navy Blue"
- Decorations: Military Cross 1 MBE 3 Military Medal 1 Mention in Despatches 18; Shaurya Chakra 1 Sena Medal 5

Insignia
- Abbreviation: 36 Med Regt

36 Medium Regiment is an artillery regiment which is part of the Regiment of Artillery of the Indian Army.

== History ==
=== Formation ===
36 (Maratha) Medium Regiment was raised as 7/5 Mahratta Light Infantry at Faizabad on October 10, 1940 under Lt Col AL Collingwood as a Maratha class unit. The Regiment underwent multiple conversions, namely -

- 7/5 (?51) (Mahratta) Regiment of Indian Armoured Corps (September, 1942) - it was part of the 268th Indian Infantry Brigade
- 8 (Mahratta) Anti-Tank Regiment (January, 1943)
- 36 (Mahratta) Para Anti-Tank Regiment (December, 1946)
- 36 (Maratha) Anti-Tank Regiment (March, 1948)
- 36 (Maratha) Heavy Mortar Regiment (April 1956)
- 36 (Maratha) Light Regiment (April 1965)
- 36 (Maratha) Heavy Mortar Regiment (October 1971), and
- 36 (Maratha) Medium Regiment (August 1981).

=== Operations ===
Some of the major operations undertaken by the Regiment include:

World War II
The Regiment was part of the XIV Army against the Japanese in the battles of Letse, Popa, Pyanbwe and Arakan.

Indo-Pakistani War of 1947–1948
The regiment was deployed in an anti-tank role on the Uri – Domel Road.

Sino-Indian War
The regiment saw action in the Tsangdhar-Zimithang and the Tawang - Sela Sectors in NEFA. It lost 62 men (killed / missing in action) during this war.

Indo-Pak War (1965)
The regiment was deployed in the Dera Baba Nanak and Amritsar sectors and participated in support of operations to occupy areas up to the Icchogil Canal. It also participated in the Battle of Dograi.
Indo-Pakistani War of 1971
The regiment had acquired the Tampella 160 mm mortar system and took part in operations in the Shakargarh Bulge and Sialkot sectors.

The unit got its present Medium Regiment designation after it was equipped with the M-46 130 mm Field Gun in 1981 and subsequently to the 155 mm Bofors gun. The regiment has taken part in Operation Rakshak, Operation Vijay, Operation Parakram, in the Siachen conflict and Operation Rhino (Assam).

== See also ==
- List of artillery regiments of Indian Army
