= 14th Battalion, Maratha Light Infantry =

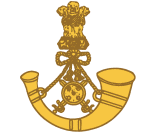
- Regimental Insignia
- Active: 1941 – 1945; 1971 – present
- Country: India
- Branch: Indian Army
- Type: War raised Infantry Battalion (1941 – 1945); Regular Infantry Battalion (1971 – present)
- Role: Light Infantry
- Nickname: Fearless XIV
- Mottos: Duty, Honour, Courage; Sanskrit: कर्तव्य सम्मान साहस
- March: SINHGARH
- Anniversaries: 1 February (Raising Day 14/5th); 1 June (Raising Day 14th); 4 February (Regimental Day)
- Engagements: World War II Indo-Pakistani War of 1971; Operation Rakshak (Punjab); Operation Hifazaat (1997 – 1999); Operation Rakshak III (2003 – 2005); Operation Meghdoot; Operation Parakram Operation Cactus Lily

Commanders
- Current commander: CLASSIFIED
- Colonel of the Regiment: CLASSIFIED

The 14th Battalion, Maratha Light Infantry (Marathi: १४वी बटॅलियन, दी मराठा लाइट इन्फेंट्री) is a battalion of infantry in the Indian Army. It was initially raised as the 14th battalion, 5th Mahratta Light Infantry on 1 February 1941, at Ambala by Lieutenant Colonel E. S. Storey-Cooper, OBE, MC, – a regular British Indian Army officer of the 2nd battalion, 5th Mahratta Light Infantry who was holding a position on the staff of GHQ India up to that time.

The battalion proceeded to Dacca, in Eastern Bengal, for a term of internal security duty in the autumn of the same year. In February 1942 the 14th battalion moved across India to undergo a period of training at Campbellpore (now known as Attock, Pakistan).

In October 1942 the 14th battalion embarked for service in the Indian Ocean as the defence garrison of the tiny Addu Atoll, which was a base vital to the aircraft patrolling of the sea routes and a possible object of Japanese attack.

At the end of 1943 the battalion returned to India for a period of special training, in the Ahmednagar and Bombay areas, in amphibious operations with the role of Beach Group to the 33rd Indian Corps. It was during this period, and following the disastrous explosion of April 1944, that the battalion performed notable service in clearing away the debris from the wrecked Bombay Docks.

In the last weeks of the war in Europe, during February 1945, the 14th battalion proceeded overseas for service in Iraq. Soon after the completion of its tour of duty there, the battalion was disbanded following the end of the Second World War.

Thereafter, the battalion was re-raised as a regular Infantry Battalion, designated the 14th battalion, Maratha Light Infantry at Belgaum on 1 June 1971, a few months prior to its induction into the Indo-Pakistani War of 1971. Lieutenant Colonel RK Dutt was the first Commanding Officer of the battalion. Since its re-raising, 14 MARATHA LI has served in almost every conceivable type of terrain and operation. The unit has been deployed in the icy heights of North Sikkim, as also the arid Thar Desert. The soldiers have earned a name for themselves and their regiment in every exercise or operation they have been a part of.

== Awards and recognitions ==
Award	Number	Details
Order of British Empire	0 (Known)	
Military Cross (MC)	0 (Known)	

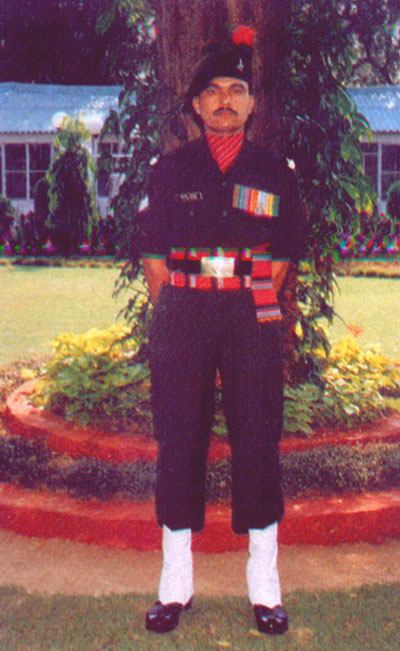
A Soldier from 14 MARATHA LI

== Soldiers of the battalion ==
Small of stature and casual of appearance, the wiry Mahratta comes of hard stock, is capable of enduring great hardships and privations which they have repeatedly proved in the hardships of the Abyssinian War, in the privations of Mesopotamia, or on the long marches of Allenby's advance through Palestine, and more recently, on the bullet-swept heights of Keren, the mountains of Italy and the jungles of Assam and Burma. The Marathas have an enviable reputation for gallantry and loyal service. They tie the military turban with one fold which falls about the head and down the neck of the soldier in the most capricious convolutions. The Marathas trace their descent to the great 17th-century warrior Shivaji. The Marathas later formed a confederacy and campaigned across vast swathes of India, watered their horses in the Indus, harried the borders of Mysore, and set the scared citizens of Calcutta to digging the Mahratta Ditch.

In recognition of their unsullied reputation for loyalty the Mahratta Light Infantry was, in 1930, formed into a completely class regiment, one of only three in the British Indian Army of that time, a matter of justifiable pride throughout the regiment.

== Uniform ==
The 14th battalion of the Maratha Light Infantry conforms to all dress regulations that are applicable to other sister battalions of the regiment (less 5 MARATHA LI, which wears a blue lanyard on the right shoulder). The officers and men of the unit also wear a green and red hackle atop their headgear (when in working dress (berets) only).

== Sources ==
- Official battalion history: Ministry of Defence.
- Library archives on Maratha Light Infantry, Mumbai.

== Bibliography ==
- A brief history of the Mahratta Light Infantry (1945) by J. S. Barr
