= 5th Mahratta Light Infantry =

Regiment of the British Indian Army

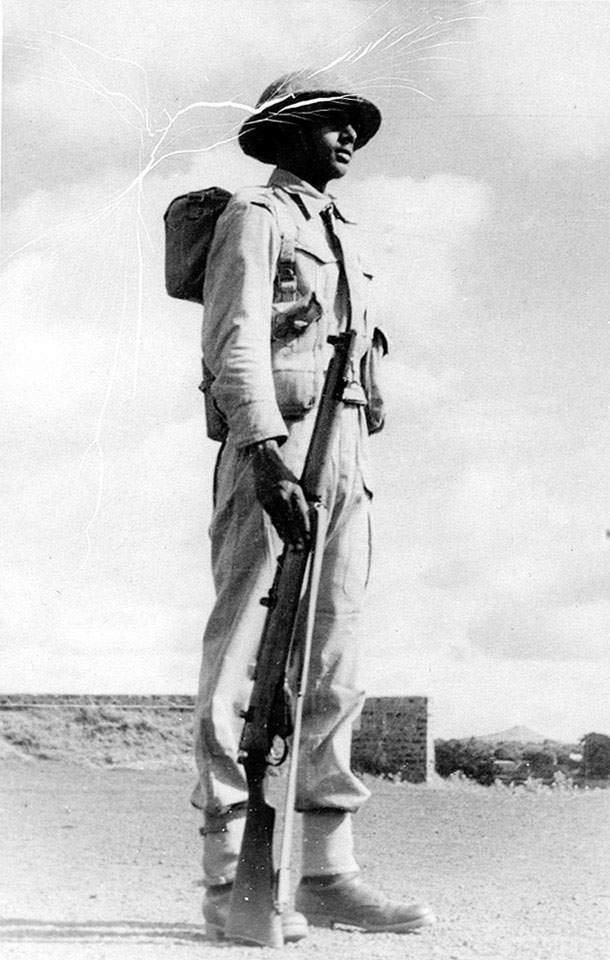
- A soldier of the 5th Mahratta Light Infantry in 1943.
- Active: 1922 - 1947
- Country: British India
- Branch: British Indian Army
- Type: Infantry

The 5th Mahratta Light Infantry was a regiment of the British Indian Army. It was formed in 1922, when the Indian government reformed the army moving from single battalion regiments to multi battalion regiments. The regiment fought in World War II and raised 30 battalions. After the war it was allocated to the Indian Army in 1947, being renamed the Maratha Light Infantry.

== Formation 1922 ==
- 1st Battalion ex 103rd Mahratta Light Infantry served in North Africa Campaign and Allied invasion of Italy during World War II. Sepoy Namdeo Jadhav was awarded the Victoria Cross (VC) in Italy in 1945.
- 2nd Battalion ex 105th Mahratta Light Infantry served in Eritrea and North Africa until June 1942 when it bore the full brunt of the German attack on Tobruk, sustaining very heavy casualties so that after the surrender of Tobruk the survivors became prisoners of war.
- 3rd Battalion ex 110th Mahratta Light Infantry served in Eritrea, North Africa and Italy during World War II. Naik Yeshwant Ghadge was awarded the Victoria Cross posthumously in Italy in 1944.
- 4th Battalion ex 116th Mahrattas served on the border of India and Burma during World War II, most notably in the defense of Imphal.
- 5th Battalion ex 117th Mahrattas. This battalion was designated 'Royal' in recognition of its exemplary service in Mesopotamia in World War I. This honour of a single battalion was unknown in the British Army and very rarely bestowed in the Indian Army. During World War II it served in the Middle East before becoming a Machine Gun battalion in Italy.
- 6th Battalion Mahratta Light infantry was created in June 1940 and in October 1942 joined its sister battalion, the 4th, in 49 Brigade in the defense of Imphal.
- 10th (Training) Battalion ex 114th Mahrattas. During World War II it trained hundreds of young soldiers to supply the needs of its sister active service and other battalions of the Regiment.
