= 2nd Battalion, Maratha Light Infantry Regiment =

Kali Panchwin (2 Maratha Light Infantry)
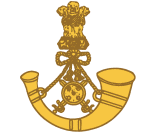
- The Regimental Insignia of the Battalion
- Active: 1768 to present
- Country: Republic of India
- Branch: Indian Army
- Type: Infantry
- Garrison/HQ: Pune
- Decorations: Ashoka Chakra Award - 1; Kirti Chakra - 1; Vir Chakra - 1; Shaurya Chakra - 7; Yudh Seva Medal - 2; Sena Medal - 13; Bar to Sena Medal - 1; Param Vishisht Seva Medal - 13; Ati Vishisht Seva Medal - 01; Mentioned in Despatches - 11; Bar to Mentioned in Despatches - 1; Chief of Army Staff Commendation Card - 39; General Officer Commanding-in-Chief Commendation - 29; Chief of Army Staff Unit Citation - 1
- Battle honours: Mysore; Seedaser; Seringapatnam; Beni-Boo-Ali; Siege of Kahun; China; Afghanistan; Burma; Mesopotamia; Kut El Amara; Baghdad; Palestine; Nablus; Sharon; Abyssinia; Keren; North Africa; Siege of Tobruk; Gubi; Hussainiwala

The Kali Panchwin, now formally called the 2nd Battalion, Maratha Light Infantry Regiment, is one of the oldest battalions of the Indian Army. It consists of troops known as Ganpats from Maharashtra in Western India.

== Pre-Independence ==
Formed in 1768 as the 3rd Battalion Bombay Sepoys, the battalion participated in almost all theatres of action in India and overseas, starting with the siege of Seringapatnam defeating Tipu Sultan. They have seen action in Mysore, Seedaser, Baghdad, Afghanistan, Dadar, Baroda, Burma, China and Palestine.

In World War I, the battalion won the battle honours of Sharon and Nablus in Palestine.

In World War II, the battalion distinguished itself in the Battle of Keren (North Africa), against Mussolini's Italian troops and native Eritreans. The battalion then made history as part of the 4th Indian Division against Rommel's Afrika Corps in the North African Campaign. It continued with victories at Kut-El-Amara and in the Western Desert Campaign at Tobruk under Montgomery. The Battalion was re-raised back in India as it had lost most of its men at Tobruk.

== Post-Independence ==
The Kali Panchwin Battalion was deployed along the border in Punjab during the Partition of India in 1947; it was also based in the Govindgarh Fort near Amritsar. It moved to Poonch in Jammu and Kashmir, and then Yol and Dagshai in Himachal.

The battalion then moved to a peacetime station in Secunderabad. In 1961-62, it was deployed to the Darjeeling sector along the Line of Actual Control with China. In 1962 it was deployed to the Gaza Strip as part of the United Nations Emergency Force under the command of Lt Col J.D. Stanley. It had an eventful tenure there, receiving accolades from the Force Commander, as well as winning most sports and drill competitions against units of other nations comprising the peace-keeping force. On its return it participated in rescue operations following an air crash near Pune.

At the outbreak of the Indo-Pakistan War of 1965, the Kali Panchwin was based in Mathura when it was deployed to Hussainiwala in the Firozpur sector of Punjab. It defended the Hussainiwala headworks against an attack by a full infantry brigade supported by armoured columns of the Pakistan Army. The enemy also used artillery fire and air support in this engagement. Two enemy tanks were destroyed and two captured, with several enemy killed. The commanding officer Col. Nolan was killed by an enemy artillery shelling the next morning while supervising operations. It was a major loss to the battalion. The battalion was visited by then Prime Minister Lal Bahadur Shastri, Defence Minister Kamraj, the Chief of Army Staff and other senior officers. Kali Panchwin was awarded the battle honour "Hussainiwala" for its role in the 1965 War.

It was among the first units to be moved to the Naga Hills counter-insurgency operations where they fought many successful missions. In an ambush Captain E.J. Tucker lost his life along with several men; for his bravery he was awarded the Ashoka Chakra Award Class I, the highest peacetime gallantry award.

After spending time in Firozpur and Fazilka, the unit was deployed to Sikkim. It celebrated its bicentenary in Pune in 1974 with Field Marshal Sam Manekshaw as chief guest. The unit was then deployed to Gulmarg Heights along the Line of Control on the border with China. After a peace tenure in Dehradun, it was deployed in counter-insurgency operations in Manipur and Mizoram.

In 1987 it returned to Pune, and subsequently air-lifted to Sri Lanka as part of the Indian Peace Keeping Force. The battalion captured 4 top leaders of the Liberation Tigers of Tamil Eelam in Batticaloa. It won 22 individual awards including one Vir Chakra.

The battalion since then has been deployed to Jammu and Kashmir thrice, as well as to Assam and Sikkim.

== Distinctions ==
- First light infantry of the Indian Army
- First Indian battalion to participate in World War II
- First Maratha battalion to participate in a UN mission
- First battalion to have lost its colonel in action (Colonel Chitty, 1917)
- First Ashoka Chakra medal in the North East

== Sources ==
- Official battalion history: Ministry of Defence, India
- Library archives on Maratha Light Infantry, Mumbai
