= Namdeo Jadav =

Indian Victoria Cross recipient

Namdeo Jadhav PVSM, VC
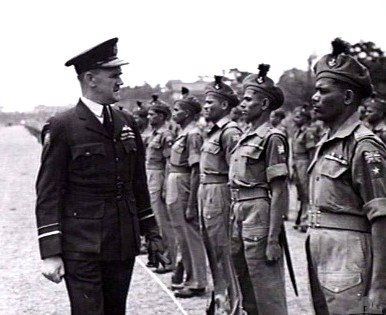
- Jadav (far right) in 1947
- Born: 18 November 1921; Nimaj, Ahmednagar district, Bombay, British India
- Died: 2 August 1984 (aged 62); Pune, India
- Military career
- Allegiance: British India; India
- Branch: British Indian Army; Indian Army
- Service years: 1950-1963
- Rank: Havildar
- Units: 5th Mahratta Light Infantry
- Conflicts: World War II
- Awards: Param Vishisht Seva Medal; Victoria Cross; 1939–45 Star; Italy Star; War Medal 1939–1945; India Service Medal; Queen Elizabeth II Coronation Medal

Namdeo Jadhav, PVSM, VC (18 November 1921 – 2 August 1984) was an Indian recipient of the Victoria Cross, the highest and most prestigious award for gallantry in the face of the enemy that can be awarded to British and Commonwealth forces.

== Details ==
Jadhav was 23 years old, and a Sepoy in the 1st Battalion, 5th Mahratta Light Infantry in the Indian Army during World War II when the following deed took place during the Spring 1945 offensive in Italy for which he was awarded the VC.

On 9 April 1945 at the Senio River, Italy, when a small party were almost wiped out in an assault on the east floodbank of the river, Sepoy Namdeo Jadhav carried two wounded men under heavy fire through deep water, up a steep bank and through a mine belt to safety. Then, determined to avenge his dead comrades, he eliminated three enemy machine-gun posts. Finally, climbing on top of the bank he shouted the Maratha war cry and waved the remaining companies across. He not only saved many lives but enabled the battalion to secure the bridgehead and ultimately to crush all enemy resistance in the area.

The citation reads:

The KING has been graciously pleased to approve the award of the VICTORIA CROSS to:—

No. 18706 Sepoy Namdeo JADHAV, 5th Mahratta Light Infantry, Indian Army.

In Italy, on the evening of the 9th April, 1945, a Company of the 5th Mahratta Light Infantry assaulted the east floodbank of the Senio river, north of S. Polito. Three minutes afterwards another Company was to pass through and assault the west floodbank.

In this sector the Senio river is about 15 feet broad, 4 to 5 feet deep and flows between precipitous floodbanks 30 to 35 feet high. Both floodbanks were honeycombed with an intricate system of German dugouts and defence posts, with a mine belt on the inner face of the east floodbank above the dugout entrances.

Sepoy Namdeo Jadhav was a Company runner and when his Company crossed the river he was with his Company Commander close behind one of the leading sections.

When wading the river and emerging on the west bank the party came under heavy fire from at least three German posts on the inner face of the east bank. The Company commander and two men were wounded and the rest, with the exception of Sepoy Namdeo Jadhav, were killed.

This gallant Sepoy immediately carried one of the wounded men through the deep water and up the precipitous slope of the bank through the mine belt to safety. He then made a second trip to bring back the other wounded man. Both times he was under heavy mortar and machine gun fire.

He then determined to eliminate the machine gun posts, which had pinned down the Companies, and to avenge his dead comrades, so, crossing the exposed east bank a third time; he dashed at the nearest enemy post and silenced it with his Tommy Gun. He was, however, wounded in the hand and, being unable to fire his gun any further, threw it away and resorted to grenades. With these he successively charged and wiped out two more enemy posts, at one time crawling to the top of the bank to replenish his stock of grenades from his comrades on the reverse slope.

Having silenced all machine gun fire from the east bank, he then climbed on to the top of it and, in spite of heavy mortar fire, stood in the open shouting the Mahratta war cry and waving the remainder of the Companies across the river.

This Sepoy not only saved the lives of his comrades, but his outstanding gallantry and personal bravery enabled the two Companies to hold the river banks firmly, and eventually the Battalion to secure a deeper bridgehead, which in turn ultimately led to the collapse of all German resistance in the area.

— London Gazette, 15 June 1945.

To commemorate his act of exceptional bravery a bust has been placed at the Aundh military station in Pune.

Adv Mr J.S.Savant, Bombay President, Maratha Recruitment Board, felicitated him for Victoria Cross, the highest and most prestigious award for gallantry in the face of the enemy that can be awarded to British and Commonwealth forces.

== Further information ==
He later reached the rank of havildar. On 9 April 2017 the Mayor of Lugo di Romagna Davide Ranalli unveiled a Memorial dedicated to VC Namdeo Jadhav upon the Senio River eastern bank in the vicinity of San Potito. The ceremony was attended by Brigadier Yogi Sheoran, Defence Wing Attaché of the Indian Embassy in Rome.
