= Yeshwant Ghadge =

Indian recipient of the Victoria Cross

Yeshwant Ghadge VC
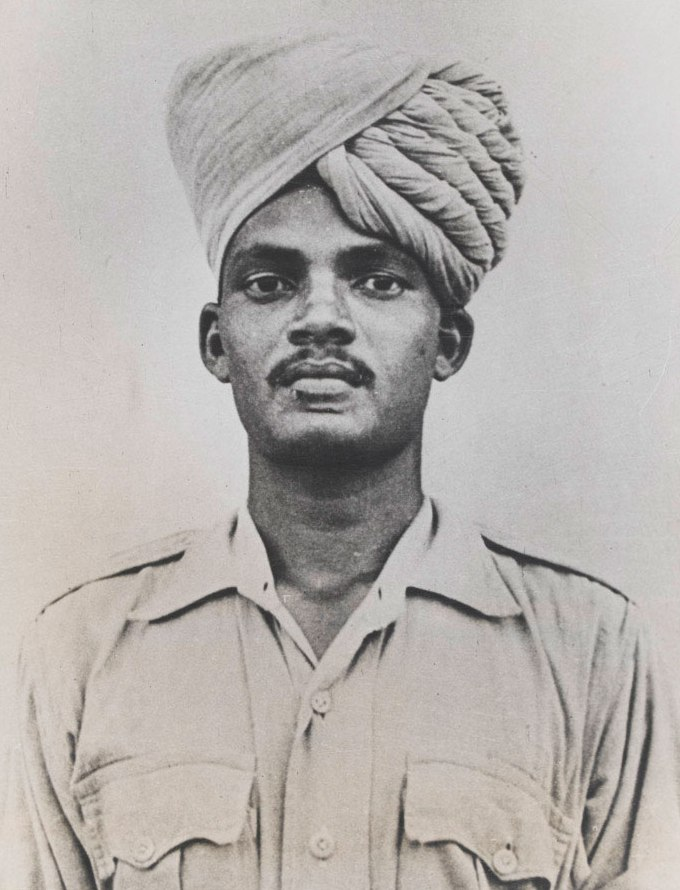
- Born: 16 November 1921; Palasgaon, Mangaon, Kolaba district, Bombay Presidency, British India
- Died: 10 July 1944 (aged 22); Morlupo (locality near Montone, province of Perugia), Fascist Italy
- Military career
- Allegiance: British India
- Branch: British Indian Army
- Rank: Naik
- Units: 5th Mahratta Light Infantry
- Conflicts: World War II; Italian Campaign (DOW)
- Awards: Victoria Cross; 1939–1945 Star; Africa Star; Italy Star; Defence Medal 1939-45; War Medal 1939–1945

Yeshwant Ghadge VC (16 November 1921 – 10 July 1944) was an Indian recipient of the Victoria Cross, the highest and most prestigious award for gallantry in the face of the enemy that can be awarded to British and Commonwealth forces.

== Details ==
He served in the 5th Mahratta Light Infantry in the British Indian Army during World War II. He was mentioned in dispatches in 1941 while a Sepoy. He had been promoted to Naik and was 22 years old when he performed the following deed for which he was awarded the VC.

On 10 July 1944 in the upper Tiber Valley, Italy, a rifle section commanded by Naik Yeshwant Ghadge came under heavy machine-gun fire at close range which killed or wounded all members of the section except the commander. Without hesitation Naik Yeshwant Ghadge rushed the machine-gun position, first throwing a grenade which knocked out the machine-gun and firer and then shooting one of the gun crew. Finally, having no time to change his magazine, he clubbed to death the two remaining members of the crew. He fell mortally wounded, shot by an enemy sniper.

The citation reads:

The KING has been graciously pleased to approve the posthumous award of the VICTORIA CROSS to:—

No. 9192 Naik Yeshwant Ghadge, 5th Mahratta Light Infantry, Indian Army.

In Italy, on 10 July 1944, a Company of the 5th Mahratta Light Infantry attacked a position strongly defended by the enemy.

During this attack a rifle section commanded by Naik Yeshwant Ghadge came under heavy machine-gun fire at close range, which killed or wounded all members of the section except the commander. Without hesitation, and well knowing that none were left to accompany him, Naik Yeshwant Ghadge rushed the machine gun post. He first threw a grenade which knocked out the machine gun and firer, after which he shot one of the gun crew with his Tommygun. Finally, having no time to change his magazine, he grasped his gun by the barrel and beat to death the remaining two men of the gun crew. Unfortunately Naik Yeshwant Ghadge was shot in the chest and back by enemy snipers and died in the post which he had captured single handed.

The courage, determination, and devotion to duty of this Indian N.C.O. in a situation where he knew the odds against him gave little hope of survival, were outstanding.

— London Gazette, 2 November 1944.

With no known grave, Ghadge is remembered at the Cassino Memorial.

To commemorate his sacrifice a statue is placed near the tahasil office, Mangaon in Raigad District. A memorial sundial, named the "V.C. Yeshwant Ghadge Sundial Memorial" was unveiled in Montone, Perugia, Italy, as a tribute to the Indian soldiers that died during the Italian Campaign. In the same place on 6 July 2025 a statue of the Indian hero was unveiled

== Decorations and Honours ==
- United Kingdom:
  - Victoria Cross
  - 1939–1945 Star
  - Africa Star
  - Italy Star
  - Defence Medal 1939-45
  - War Medal 1939–1945
