= Mysore (1789–1791) =

Third Anglo-Mysore War
- Part of the Anglo-Mysore Wars
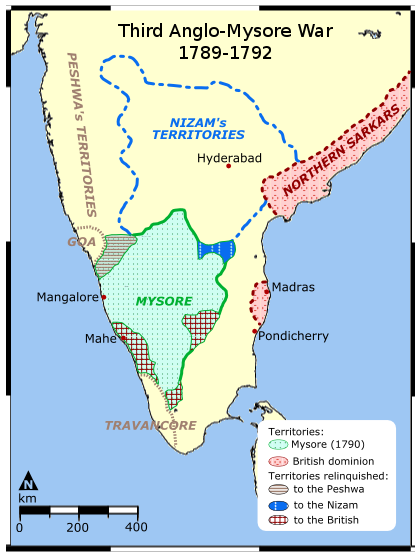
- A map of the war theatre
Date	1789–1792
Location	South India
Result	Treaty of Seringapatam
Territorial changes	Mysore cedes about one-half of its territory to opponents

Belligerents
Mysore; Supported by Kingdom of France	East India Company (Kingdom of Great Britain) Great Britain; Maratha Empire; Hyderabad Travancore

Commanders and leaders
Tipu Sultan; Sayed Sahib; Reza Sahib; Sipahdar Syad Hamid Sahib; Martab Khan Sahib; Buhadur Khan Sahib; Badr ul-Zaman Khan Sahib; Hussein Ali Khan Sahib; Sher Khan Sahib; Kamaluddin	William Medows; Charles, Earl Cornwallis (Kingdom of Great Britain) Captain Sir Richard Strachan; Parshuram Bhau; Hurry Punt; Teige Wunt; Travancore Dharma Raja

The battle honour of Mysore commemorates the action of native units of the British East India Company in the Third Anglo-Mysore War of 1789–92.

Tipu Sultan attacked Travancore on 29 December 1789 and this made the Nizam of Hyderabad and the Marathas apprehensive who entered into a "Triple Alliance" with the British. The Third Anglo-Mysore War went on for about two years in three campaigns. Cornwallis, the Governor General took command after the first campaign, captured Bangalore on 21 March 1791 but failed to capture Seringapatnam due to brilliant generalship of Tipu and the rains. Fighting was resumed later and Tipu captured Coimbatore on 3 November. Helped by an Army sent from Bombay, Cornwallis occupied the hill fort of Nandy Droog about 50 kilometres (31 mi) north of Bangalore on his line of communication towards Seringapatnam where he reached on 5 February 1792. Tipu averted a complete disaster and concluded a treaty in March surrendering half his dominions; a large portion went to the Nizam, a portion went to the Marathas, the English acquired Malabar and Coorg on the west coast, Dindigul and adjoining districts. on the south and the Baramahal district on the east.

The honour was awarded to 29 units of the armies of the Bombay and Madras Presidency through order 378 of 1889; only 15 units survive. It was awarded to four units of the Bengal Native Infantry in 1829; these units mutinied in 1857.

The battle honour is considered repugnant.
