= Bani Bu Ali expedition =

The Bani Bu Ali expedition (1820–21) was a punitive campaign launched by the Sultan of Muscat and the East India Company against an Omani tribe known as the Bani Bu Ali (Note: Also known as Beni Bu Ali or Banu Bu Ali.) in southeastern Arabia. It consisted of two expeditions. The first was the only land campaign Said bin Sultan conducted in Arabia during his long reign. It included a small allied British force and was defeated. The second, led by a more substantial British component, resulted in a decisive victory over the Bani Bu Ali. Company units engaged in the expedition received the "Beni Boo Alli" battle honour.

== Background ==
The Bani Bu Ali tribe occupied the fortified village of Belad Bani Bu Ali (Place of the Sons of Ali) in Oman, in the hinterland of the Sultanate of Muscat, whose suzerainty the tribe nominally recognized. They did not, however, respect the good relations of sultan with the Company and engaged in piracy in the Arabian Sea.

In 1819, the Company carried out a punitive expedition to Ras al Khaimah, which destroyed a pirate base and removed the threat of piracy from the Persian Gulf. As a result, several Gulf states signed the General Maritime Treaty of 1820 outlawing piracy. When the Bani Bu Ali murdered the pilot of a British ship carrying a British envoy at Rass al Junaiz, (Note: Also known as Rass al Hadd.) it was decided to dispatch of a small punitive expedition from India to Ash Sharqiyah (Oman) to assist the sultan in subduing the Bani Bu Ali.

== First expedition (1820) ==
The expedition sailed from Bombay in October 1820 and sailed to Sur via Muscat. The small force consisting of six companies (380 men) of Indian infantry, along with four six-pounder guns, under Captain Perronet Thomson joined the sultan's force of about 2000 irregulars. They proceeded inland to Belad Bani Bu Ali, the tribal capital.

When negotiations failed, on 18 November 1820, this force was attacked and almost annihilated as they approached the capital. The Arabs had charged with spears and swords. A majority of the British officers (seven) and two-thirds of the soldiers (270) were killed as the Arabs gave no quarter. The guns were all captured. The survivors, including many of the wounded, returned to Sur, thence to Muscat from where they were taken to Qishm at the entrance of the Persian Gulf.

== Second expedition (1821) ==
The destruction of this force was a major blow to British prestige in Arabia and a second stronger expedition was assembled. This force of 6000 mixed British soldiers and Indian sepoys, under Major General Lionel Smith, sailed from Bombay on 11 January 1821.

This force contained engineer elements of the Bombay Presidency army consisting of the newly formed company of the Bombay Sappers and Miners who, under Capt. T. Dickinson (Bombay Engineers) and assisted by Lt T.B. Jervis (Bombay Engineers), were proceeding abroad for the first time in their history. Along with the Sappers and Miners company sailed the 3rd Company of the Bombay Pioneers who had recently served in the 1819 Ras al-Khaimah expedition to suppress piracy in the Persian Gulf.

The force disembarked at Sur on 27 January and marched into the interior. Repulsing an attack on 10 February, they reached Balad Bani Nu Hassan on 2 March. The Bani bu Ali advanced with desperate fanaticism to give battle in the open, ignoring the cannonades of grape-shot from the British artillery. The Arabs fought bravely with broad-sword and shield, attempting to break the British line, causing havoc at close quarters wherever they could do so. However, the line of bayonets prevailed and the Bani bu Ali were beaten off, leaving behind 500 dead and dying. On the other hand, the British casualties were 29 dead and 173 wounded. The fort at Balad was occupied after a brief bombardment. Later, the expedition returned to Sur where they embarked for Bombay.

The Bani bu Ali were defeated, the fort at their capital occupied and British prestige restored.

== Battle honour ==
By a General Order of the Bombay Presidency, dated 11 February 1831, all units which had served in the expedition were awarded the battle honour Beni Boo Ali, including the Bombay Pioneers and the Bombay Sappers and Miners. Beni Boo Ali heads the list of battle and theatre honours of the Bombay Sappers today. This honour is not considered repugnant.

The following Bombay Army units were awarded the battle honour :

- 3rd Company, Bombay Pioneer Battalion - Bombay Sappers
- 1st/13th Bombay Infantry - The Grenadiers Regimental Centre
- lst/3rd Bombay Infantry - 1st Battalion Maratha Light Infantry
- 1st/5th Bombay Infantry - 2nd Battalion Maratha Light Infantry
- 2nd /4th Bombay Infantry - 1st Battalion, Rajputana Rifles - now 3rd Battalion, Brigade of Guards
- 2nd/18th Bombay Infantry (Disbanded)
- 1st/17th Bombay Infantry (Disbanded 1933 as the 1st Battalion 2nd Bombay Pioneers)
- 1st Troop/The Horse Brigade, Bombay Artillery
- 5th Company/2nd Battalion The Foot Artillery, Bombay Artillery
