= Siege of Kahun =

1840 battle of the First Anglo-Afghan War

- Part of First Anglo-Afghan War
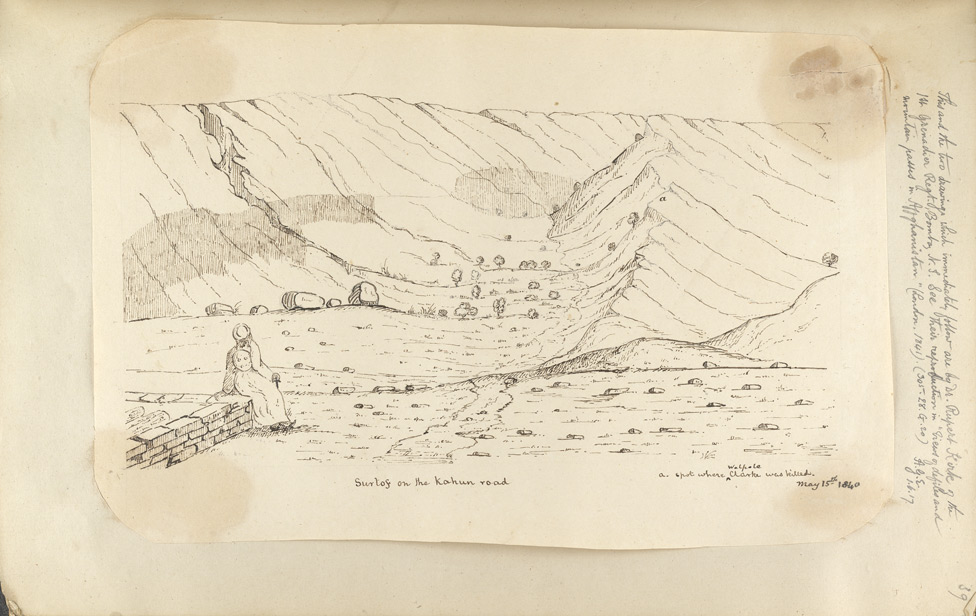
- Contemporary sketch of the region near Kahun Fort, where the attack on a British convoy led to the siege
Date	16 May – 25 September 1840
Location	Kahun, Afghanistan (today Pakistan) 29°17′53.25″N 68°54′8.28″E
Result	Marri victory: British capitulate; Marri return to Kahun

Belligerents
(United Kingdom) United Kingdom; Support: Bugti Tribe	Marri Tribe

Commanders and leaders
(United Kingdom) Lewis Brown	Mir Sharbat Khan & Sardar Doda Khan

Strength
140	2,000
- Location within Pakistan

The siege of Kahun was a siege of the isolated fort-town of Kahun, Balochistan, that lasted from 16 May until 28 September 1840, during the First Anglo-Afghan War. The outpost was defended by a battalion of 140 men in extremely hot, inhospitable conditions against an overwhelming native force until they were forced to capitulate.

== Background ==
In mid-December 1839, a force consisting of 150 soldiers of the 1st Grenadiers, and 60 Irregular horses, commanded by Captain George Raitt, was dispatched from Lehri (29°10′56″N 68°12′38″E) to take possession of Kahun, the "capital" of the Marri tribe, who occupied a portion of the mountainous country east of the Bolan Pass. After their arrival, Riatt estimated there were about 400 warriors and at least 2000 "fighting men" in the town. Despite introducing themselves peacefully, Kahun's chief Dodah later heard of the intention to occupy the fort, and came in person to Riatt to discourage him from this, as the town's people already had shown hostility towards the soldiers. Captain Riatt left a detachment of 100 men posted within a mile of Kahun, and returned to join Major Billamore.

Days later, with the Marri having left their habitations, and moved to the hills with their families and property, the town was left empty, and the detachment posted there by Riatt, now of no more use, departed and joined Billamore's men at around 10 and 12 January 1840.

In April 1840, Kahun was ordered once more to be occupied. The command of the troops directed for this service was entrusted to two of the officers who had accompanied expeditions under Major Billamore – Captain Lewis Brown and Lieutenant Walpole Clarke. On 11 May, the troops arrived at the fort, now abandoned.

== Siege ==
After the troops were settled, Captain Brown ordered the empty camels to be returned to Foliji (28°59′41″N 68°20′56″E) under the charge of Lieutenant Clarke, and on 16 May, at 2 a.m., the return convoy departed with 80 infantry soldiers and 50 irregular horses, plus 5 havildars and 80 "rank and rifle". Finding no opposition in crossing the first hill, Clarke supposedly directed their return to Kahun. While on their way they were attacked by about 2000 balochs, and soon the escorts were overwhelmed by enemy forces. Lieutenant Clarke and most of the soldiers died, with only 12 survivors having returned to Kahun.

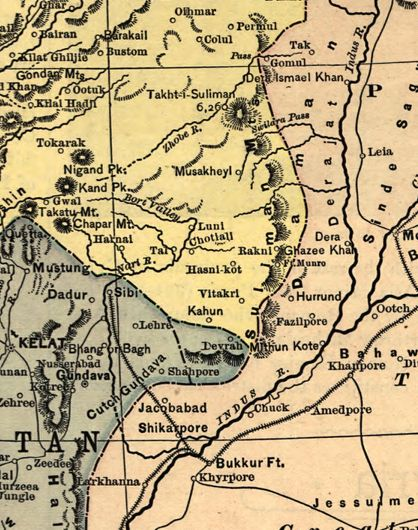
1893 American map showing Kahun (below the center of the image), north-northeast of Jacobabad

This reduced Brown's force to 140 men, and the enemy force immediately besieged Kahun. Holding off the besieging force from May to September, Brown eventually received word from the Officer Commanding in Upper Sind to do whatever he thought best for his men's safety and so capitulated on 25 September. The Marris accorded him the honours of war, letting the small remnants of Brown's force to march out in possession of their arms, guns, ammunition, and baggage. In recognition of their conduct, the General Orders of 5 April 1841 accorded the battle honour "Kahun" to the 5th Native Infantry and in May 1841 the unit was honoured by being made "Light Infantry".

== See also ==
- Marri-Bugti Country
