= Theophilus Waldmeier =

Theophilus Waldmeier (February 2, 1832 in Möhlin near Basel – March 10, 1915 in Beirut) was a Swiss missionary who later became a Quaker.

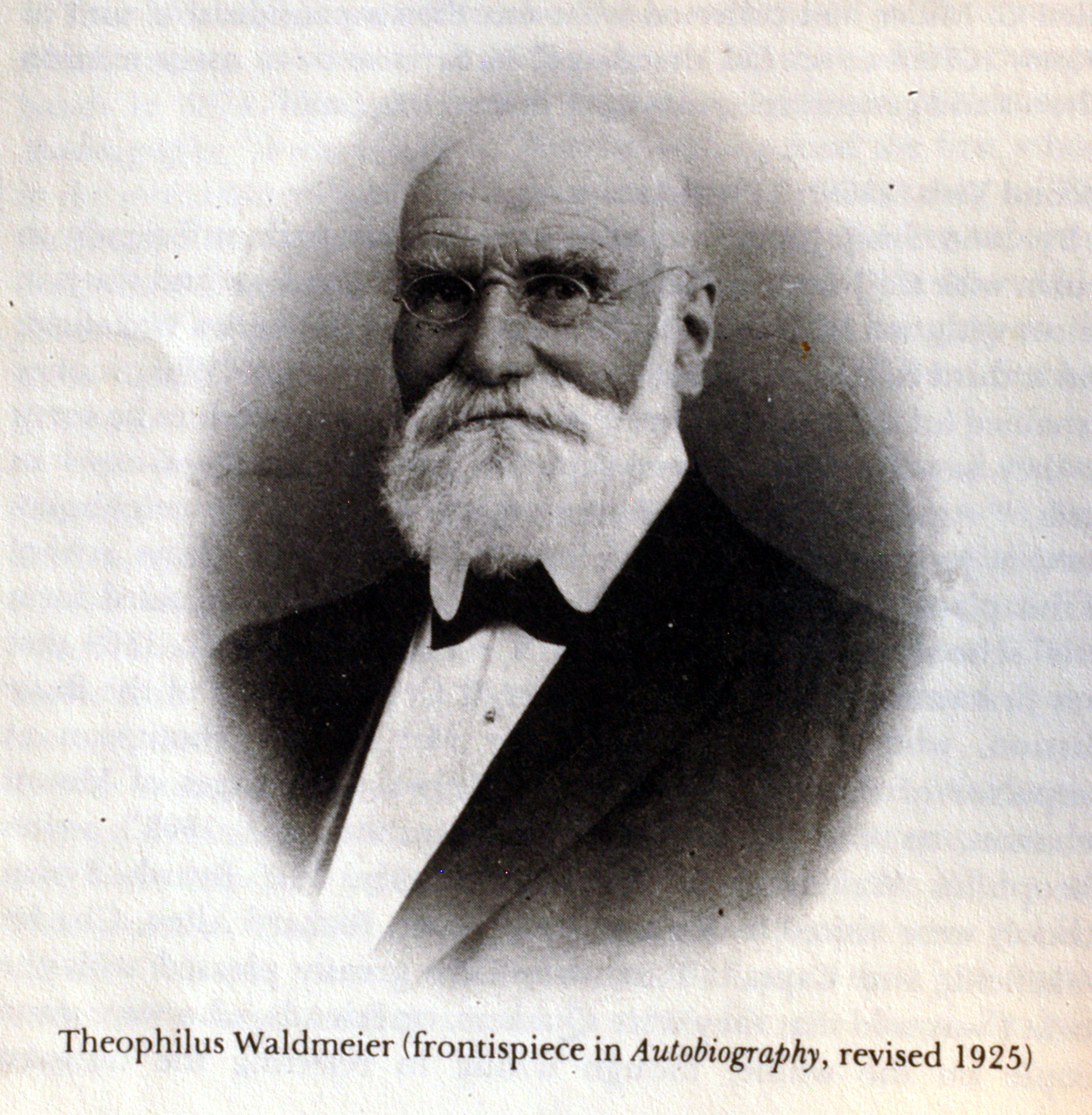
Theophilus Waldmeier

Waldmeier was born in the Canton of Aargau and was brought up by his mother and grandmother, strict Roman Catholics, who insisted on three hours of daily prayer. Deeply unhappy he ran away to an uncle in Lörrach. Despite finishing his schooling in a Roman Catholic school he came under the influence of Evangelical Christians and developed an ambition to become a missionary. He enrolled in the Evangelical Training School for Foreign Missionaries in St. Chrischona and was consecrated in September 1858. Under the guidance of Bishop Samuel Gobat he immediately set out for Abyssinia, accompanied by the Bishop, who was returning to Jerusalem. In Alexandria he joined four other missionaries on a six-month journey down the Nile and across eastern Sudan to Debre Tabor. Two of his companions died on the journey. On arrival they were introduced to King Theodore and joined four other missionaries already there. Nine months after his arrival he married Susan Bell, the eldest daughter of Theodore's Anglo-Irish Prime Minister, John Bell. She was around twelve years old. Her mother was a member of the royal family.

The Europeans were allowed to establish a boarding school which included an artisan training program. During this period Susan gave birth to five children, four of them, all boys, died in infancy. Only their daughter Rosa survived. Waldmeier became one of the King Theodore's favourites. Things changed as Theodore's character became more volatile and cruel. In 1866 he imprisoned all Europeans and their families. Waldmeier and his colleagues were put in charge of casting an enormous bronze mortar, the Sebastopol, capable of firing a 1000lb cannonball. Thousands of people were involved in its construction. The following year the king moved his court to the mountain fortress at Magdala. Special roads had to be made for the Sebastopol which at times needed eight hundred men to move. The 200 mile journey took six months. Meanwhile, the British sent an Anglo-Indian army to rescue the hostages. In 1868 following the defeat of his army at Magdala the king released his fifty-seven European prisoners before killing himself. During their two years as captives the fifth of Waldmeier's sons died.

He went to Beirut with the British Syrian Mission (which was founded in 1860). He started the Friends' Syrian Mission in 1873, founded Brummana High School in 1873 and the 'Aṣfūriyyeh Mental Hospital, an influential psychiatric hospital which lasted from 1896 until 1982. In 1874, he traveled to Europe to seek financial backing from the Society of Friends. British and American Quakers provided support for the Brummana School.

== Notes ==
https://hls-dhs-dss.ch/de/articles/049463/2024-11-04/

https://www.researchgate.net/publication/309633685_Die_befreiten_Geiseln_Kaiser_Tewodros%27_II_Aus_dem_Photoalbum_der_Royal_Engineers_186768
