= Herbert Wood =

Herbert Wood may refer to:

- Herbert M. Wood (1877–1966), Canadian politician
- Herbert William Wood (1837–1879), English army officer and geographer
- H. G. Wood (Herbert George Wood, 1879–1963), British theologian and academic
- Herbie Wood (Herbert Sydney Wood, 1920–2001), Australian rules footballer

== See also ==
- Herbert Woods (1891–1954), English boat builder
