= Battle of Magdala =

Battle between British Indian Army and Emperor Tewodros II of Ethiopia in 1868

- Part of the 1868 Expedition to Abyssinia
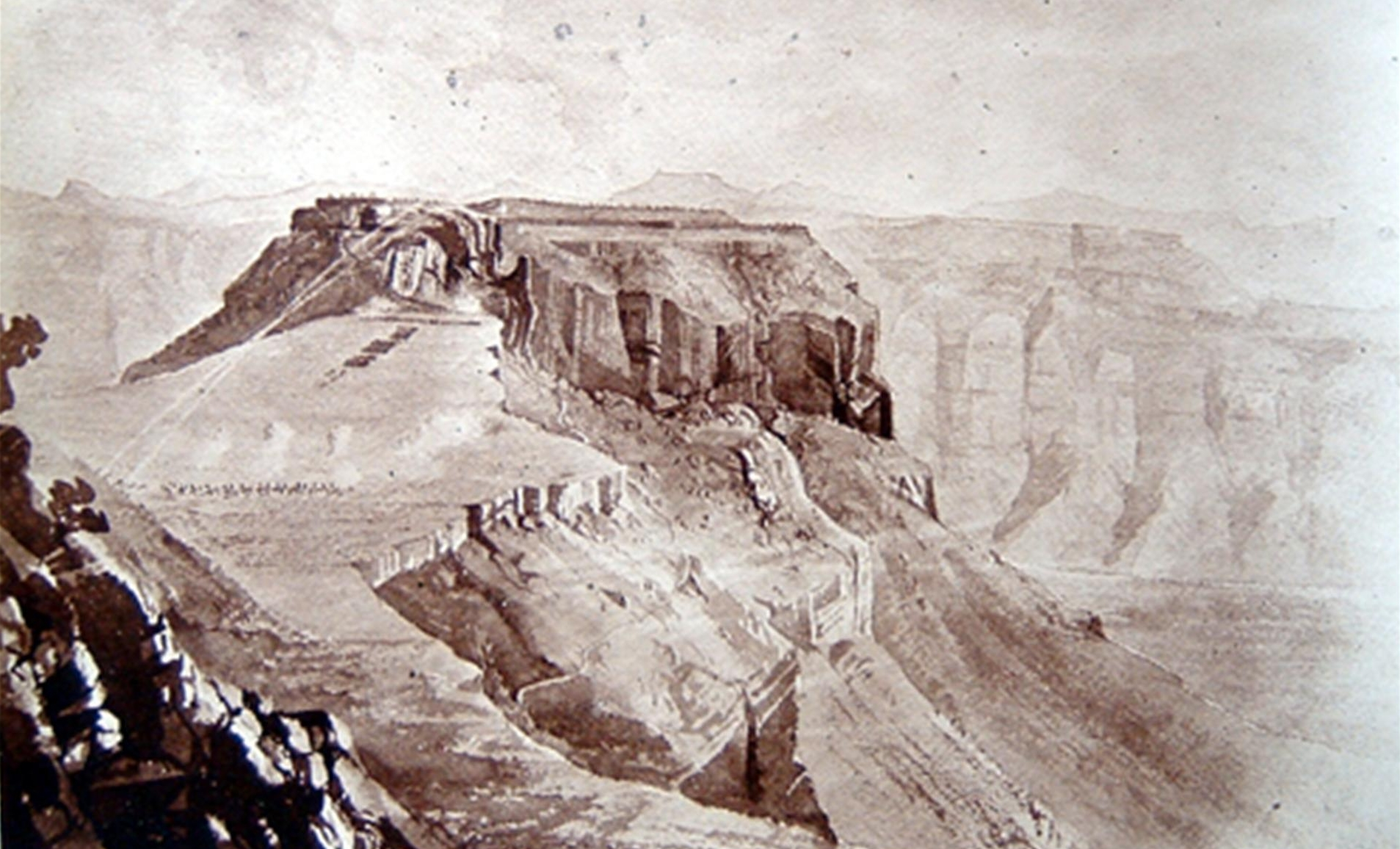
Date	9–13 April 1868 (4 days)
Location	Magdala, Ethiopia 11°20′47″N 39°10′53″E
Result	British victory

Belligerents
United Kingdom: India; Supported by: Ethiopian rebels	Ethiopian Empire

Commanders and leaders
(British Raj) Sir Robert Napier	Tewodros II †

Strength
(British Raj) 13,000	~4,000

Casualties and losses
2 killed; 200 wounded	700 killed; 1,200 wounded

The Battle of Magdala was the conclusion of the British Expedition to Abyssinia fought in April 1868 between British and Abyssinian forces at Magdala, 390 miles (630 km) from the Red Sea coast. The British were led by Robert Napier, while the Abyssinians were led by Emperor Tewodros II.

The Battle of Derasge marked a decisive turning point in Ethiopian history, bringing an end to the Zemene Mesafint ('Era of the Princes') and paving the way for the rise of Emperor Tewodros II and the unification of the Ethiopian Empire. Following his victory at the Battle of Derasge and accession to the imperial throne as Tewodros II, the new emperor embarked on an ambitious program of national reform. Determined to unify Ethiopia and assert its independence, he set out to centralize administration, consolidate political power, and establish a modern, professional army to protect the empire from outside threats most urgently from Egypt. His experience during the Battle of Debarki 1848, where his armies suffered heavy losses at the hands of better-trained and better-equipped Egyptian soldiers, had left an indelible mark. It taught Tewodros the imperative of military discipline, high-level training, and modern weapons, which became central to his drive for modernization. Based on his mission of building a united and strong state, Emperor Tewodros II initiated large-scale military reform to update the armed forces in Ethiopia. He established systematic military training, uniform drills, and introduced new ranks such as Aseraleqa (corporal), Hamsaleqa (sergeant), Metoleqa (lieutenant), and Shaleqa (major). His first priority was the establishment of a well-trained, well-disciplined national army equipped with modern weapons.

Tewodros, being aware of the technology and military disparity of Ethiopia, specifically following his loss at the Battle of Debarki in 1848, sought to redefine the capability of Ethiopia for defense. Rather than relying on European foreign weapons, he wanted to have local arm production. Toward this end, he enlisted the services of the European great powers most notably Britain for skilled persons and technical knowledge. In a series of letters, he appealed to Queen Victoria to send experts to facilitate the manufacture of modern weapons domestically.

The British government did not respond to these demands and Emperor Tewodros took provocative action by detaining British consul Captain Charles Duncan Cameron and certain European diplomats and missionaries. He compelled them to assist in the production of weapons at his gun-foundry in Gafat, near his capital Debre Tabor, even though they lacked technical expertise. Some of the arms produced are a massive mortar, which Tewodros himself hailed as "Sevastopol."

In accordance with an effort to negotiate the release of the hostages, Britain dispatched Hormuzd Rassam, yet Tewodros refused to free them. The diplomatic effort having failed, the British government dispatched a military expedition in 1867, commanded by General Robert Napier, with a single aim of securing the release of the European hostages. By the British advance, Tewodros' force had dwindled to an estimated 5,000–10,000 troops, far outnumbered and outarmed by Napier's 32,000–40,000-strong Anglo-Indian army. On 10 April 1868, the two forces clashed at the Battle of Arogee, where Tewodros' devoted general, Fitawrari Gebreye, was killed, dealing a severe blow to the emperor's command staff.

Following defeat at Arogee, British forces advanced on Magdala, Tewodros' mountain fortress stronghold. In spite of insisting on his unconditional surrender, Tewodros refused. Finally, he released all the European hostages and, on 13 April 1868, took his own life so that he would not be captured as a prisoner by the British troops, who then looted the fortress, stripping away the cultural and religious riches, a common custom for conquerors at the time. They also arrested his young son, Prince Alemayehu Tewodros, along with his mother, Empress Tiruwork Wube, and left Ethiopia shortly thereafter.

Capture of Magdala not only led to disastrous defeat for Emperor Tewodros II but also witnessed a turning point in the Ethiopian chronicle, an occasion of both the challenges of modernization and the reaction of colonial intervention.

== Preparation and formation ==
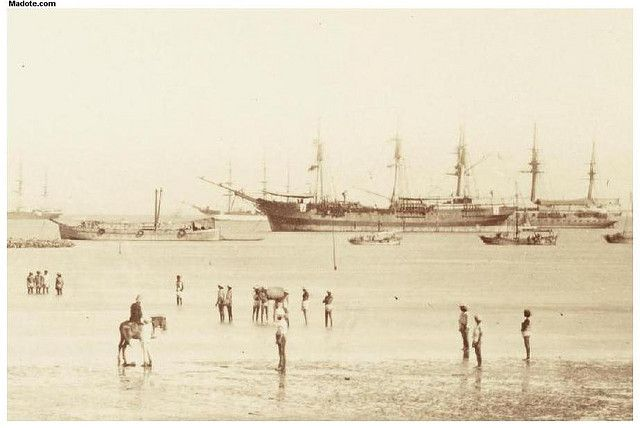
British naval & support ships, Annesley Bay December 1867

Advance elements of the British military units arrived at Annesley Bay on 4 December 1867; but did not disembark until 7 December due to chaotic conditions on shore. Thousands of mules had been sent from Egypt and other countries before adequate arrangements had been made to feed and water them and the freshly arrived troops had to first obtain fresh feed and water for them. A base camp was set up at Zula.

The British were dressed in new khaki drill jackets with a white cloth-covered cork helmet called a 'Topi'. They had been issued the new breech-loading Snider-Enfield rifles the previous year, which had increased the soldiers' firepower from three rounds per minute to ten rounds per minute.

Lord Napier arrived in early January 1868 and the expedition started from the advance camp at Senafe at the beginning of February. It took two months to reach their objective. The advancing British forces' route took them through rough terrain, traveling by way of Kumayli, Senafe, Adigrat, Antalo, passing west of Lake Ashangi, through the Wajirat Mountains and across the Wadla plateau, before finally arriving via the road Emperor Tewodros built through the Zhitta Ravine to move his heavy artillery to Magdala.

Composed of some 12,000 British and Indian troops, beside Royal Artillery and Royal Engineers, the field force comprised:

British: 3rd (The Prince of Wales's) Dragoon Guards, the 4th (King's Own) Regiment of Foot, 33rd Regiment of Foot (1st West Riding Regiment). Six companies of infantry from the 45th Nottinghamshire Regiment (Sherwood Foresters) and a Royal Navy rocket battery. The Armstrong Artillery Battery, complete with elephants carrying their guns, joined the expedition on the plain at Talanta on 5 April, just 12 miles (19 km) from Magdala during a delay of four days waiting for supplies to arrive. Towards the end of the campaign the 26th (Cameronian) Regiment of Foot also arrived.

Indian: 10th Regt of Bengal Cavalry (Lancers), 12th Regt of Bengal Cavalry, 3rd Regt of Bombay Lt Cavalry, 21st Punjab Regt Bengal Native Infantry, 23rd Punjab Regt Bengal Native Infantry (Pioneers), 2nd Bombay Native Infantry (Grenadier), 3rd Bombay Native Infantry, 10th Bombay Native Infantry, 21st Bombay Native Infantry (Marine), 25th Bombay Native Light Infantry, 27th Bombay Native Infantry (1st Belooch), No 1 Company of Bombay Native Artillery, Corps of Madras Sappers and Miners, Corps of Bombay Sappers and Miners.

While it is difficult to obtain an accurate order of battle of the Abyssinian forces, from British reports it appears to have consisted of a small amount of artillery and several thousands of light infantry lacking firearms.

== The battle ==
Before the force could actually attack Magdala, they had to get past the plateau at Arogye, which lay across the only route to Magdala. It certainly looked formidable to attack. The British could see the way barred by many thousands of armed Abyssinians camped around the hillsides with up to 30 artillery pieces.

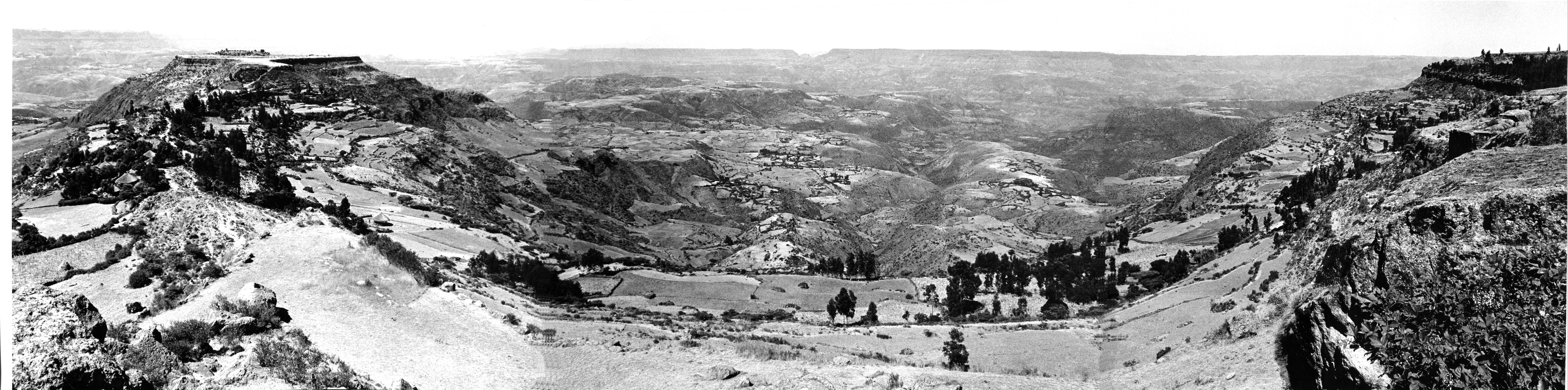
The plateau at Arogye, overlooking the route to Magdala

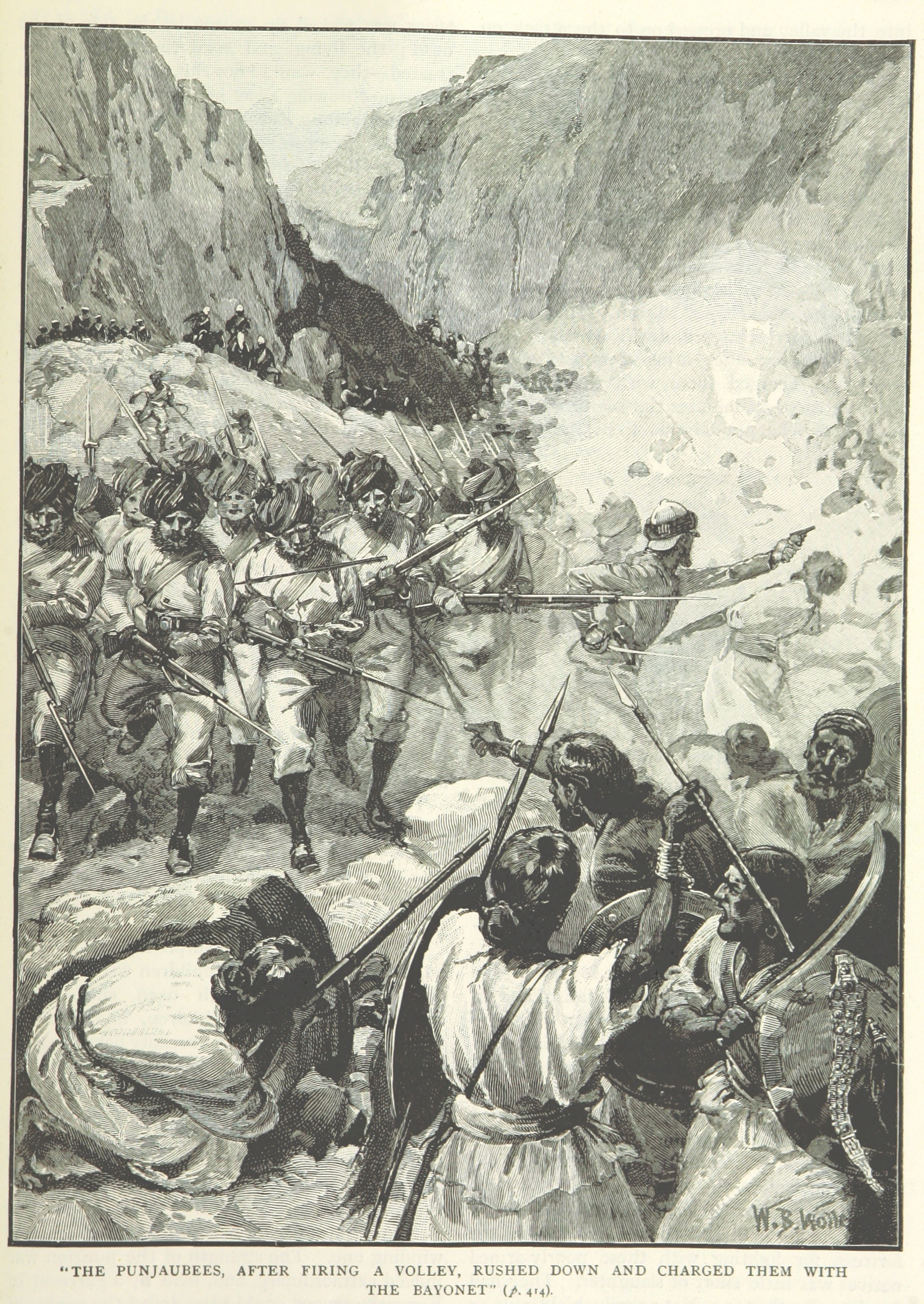
Indian troops charge the Abyssinian lines at Arogye (illustration from a British book)

The British did not expect that the Abyssinian warriors would leave their defenses to attack them and paid little regard to their defensive positions as they formed up to deploy. But the Emperor did order an attack, with many thousands of soldiers armed with little more than spears. The 4th Regiment of Foot quickly redeployed to meet the charging mass of warriors and poured a devastating fire into their ranks. When two Indian infantry regiments contributed their firepower, the onslaught became even more devastating. Despite this, the Abyssinian soldiers continued their attack, losing over 500 with more wounded during the ninety minutes of fighting, most of them at a point little over 30 yards from the British lines. During the chaotic battle, an advance guard unit of the 33rd Regiment outgunned some of the Abyssinian artillerymen and captured their artillery pieces. The surviving Abyssinian soldiers then retreated back onto Magdala.

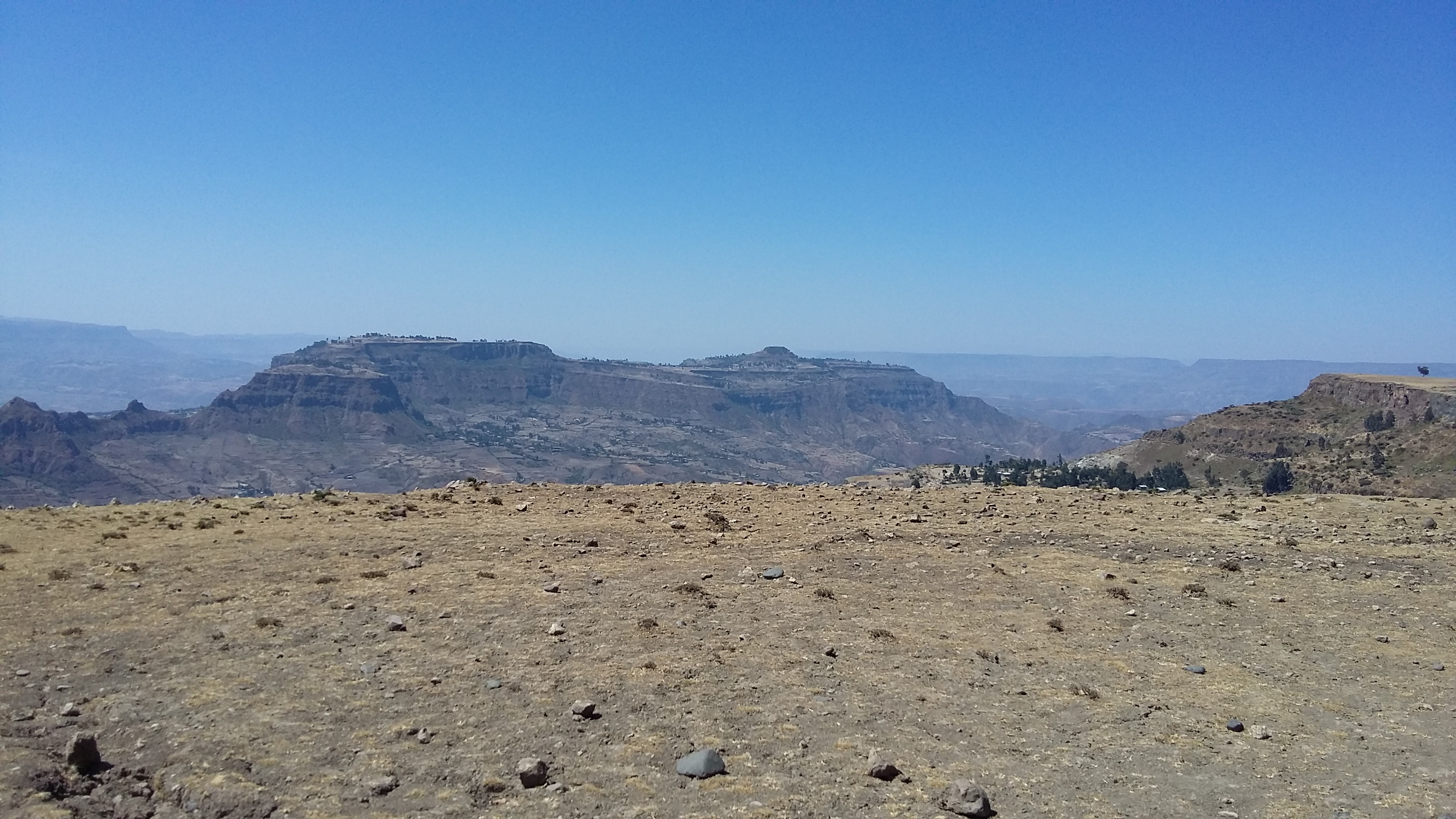
The stronghold of Emperor Tewodros II

The Anglo-Indian advance party involved in this first clash numbered between 600 and 700 men. One of the missionaries who observed the fighting noted that the breech-loading Snider rifles, firing six volleys a minute, were decisive.

In his despatch to London, Lord Napier reported: "Yesterday morning (we) descended three thousand nine hundred feet to Bashilo River and approached Magdala with First Brigade to reconnoitre it. Theodore opened fire with seven guns from outwork, one thousand feet above us, and three thousand five hundred men of the garrison made a gallant sortie which was repulsed with very heavy loss and the enemy driven into Magdala. British Loss, twenty wounded."

Two of the British soldiers wounded in the attack would later die from their injuries.

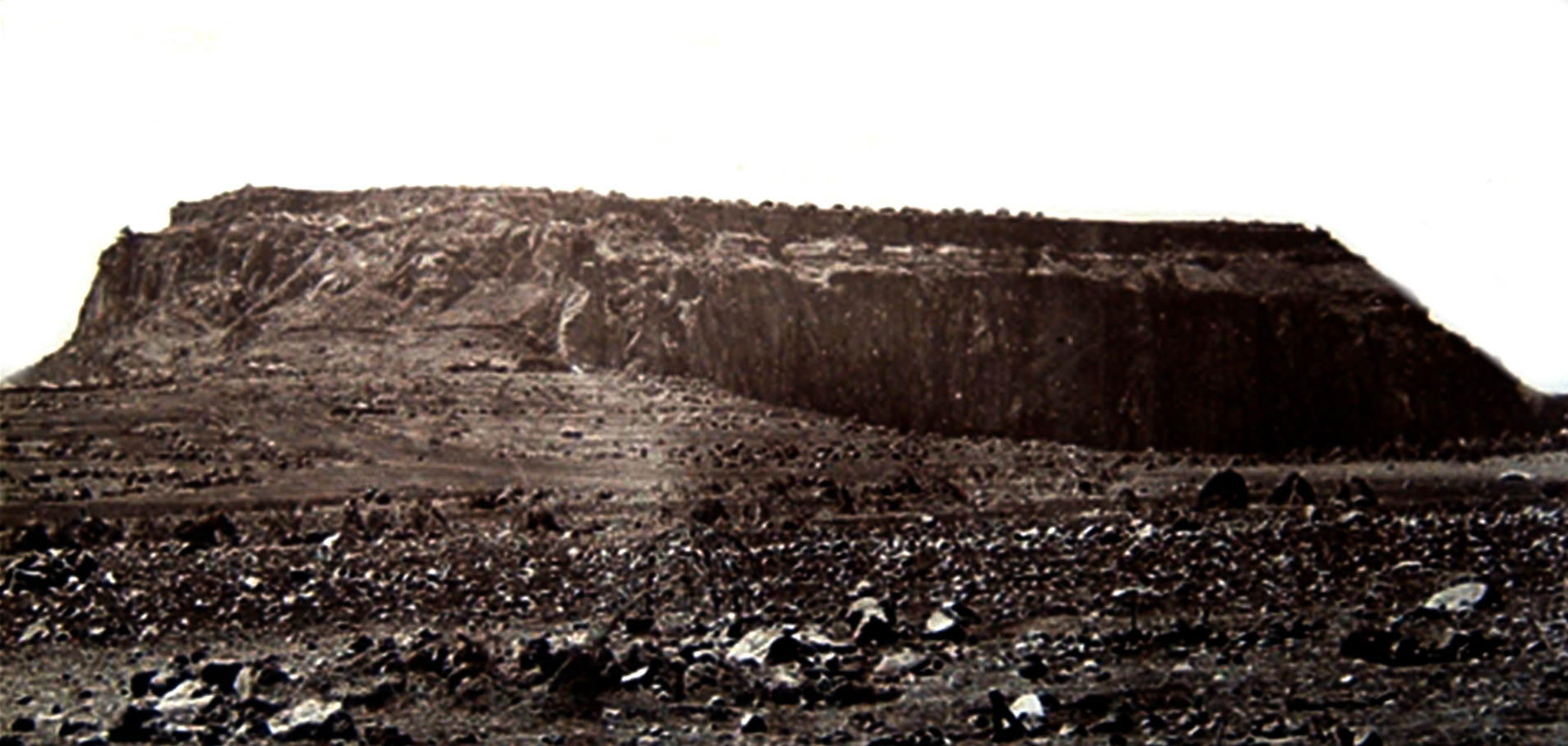
The Fortress of Magdala, prior to its destruction in April 1868

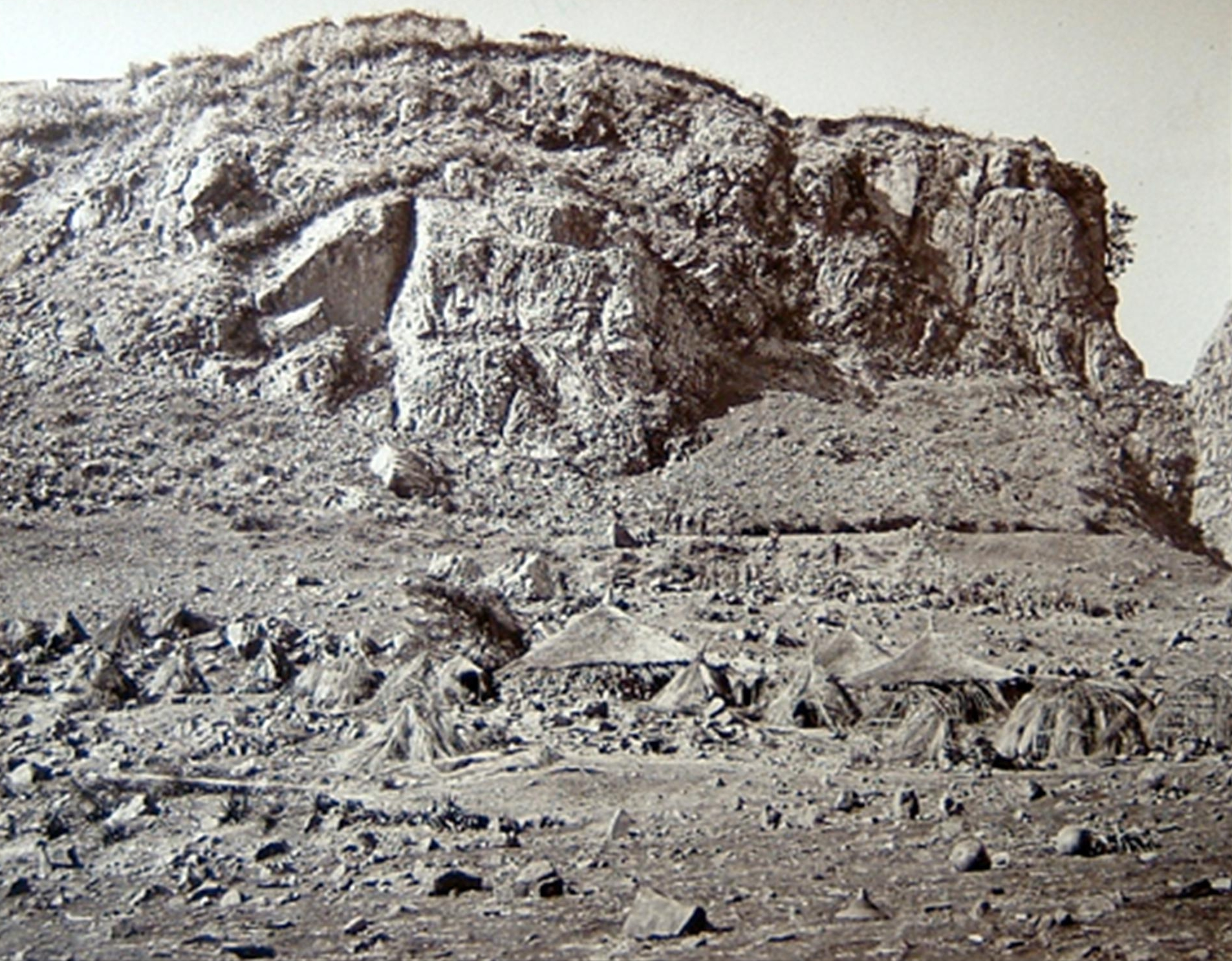
Pathway to main gateway into Magdala

The following day the British force moved on to Magdala. Writing later, Clements Markham recalled "a curious phenomenon" that occurred on the day of the final assault: "Early in the forenoon a dark-brown circle appeared round the sun, like a blister, about 15° in radius; light clouds passed and repassed over it, but it did not disappear until the usual rain-storm came up from the eastward late in the afternoon. Walda Gabir, the king's valet, informed me that Theodore saw it when he came out of his tent that morning, and that he remarked that it was an omen of bloodshed."

Tewodros II sent two of the hostages on parole to offer terms. Napier insisted on the release of all the hostages and an unconditional surrender. Tewodros refused to cede to the unconditional surrender, but did release the European hostages. The British continued the advance and assaulted the fortress. (The native hostages were later found to have had their hands and feet cut off before being sent over the edge of the precipice surrounding the plateau.)

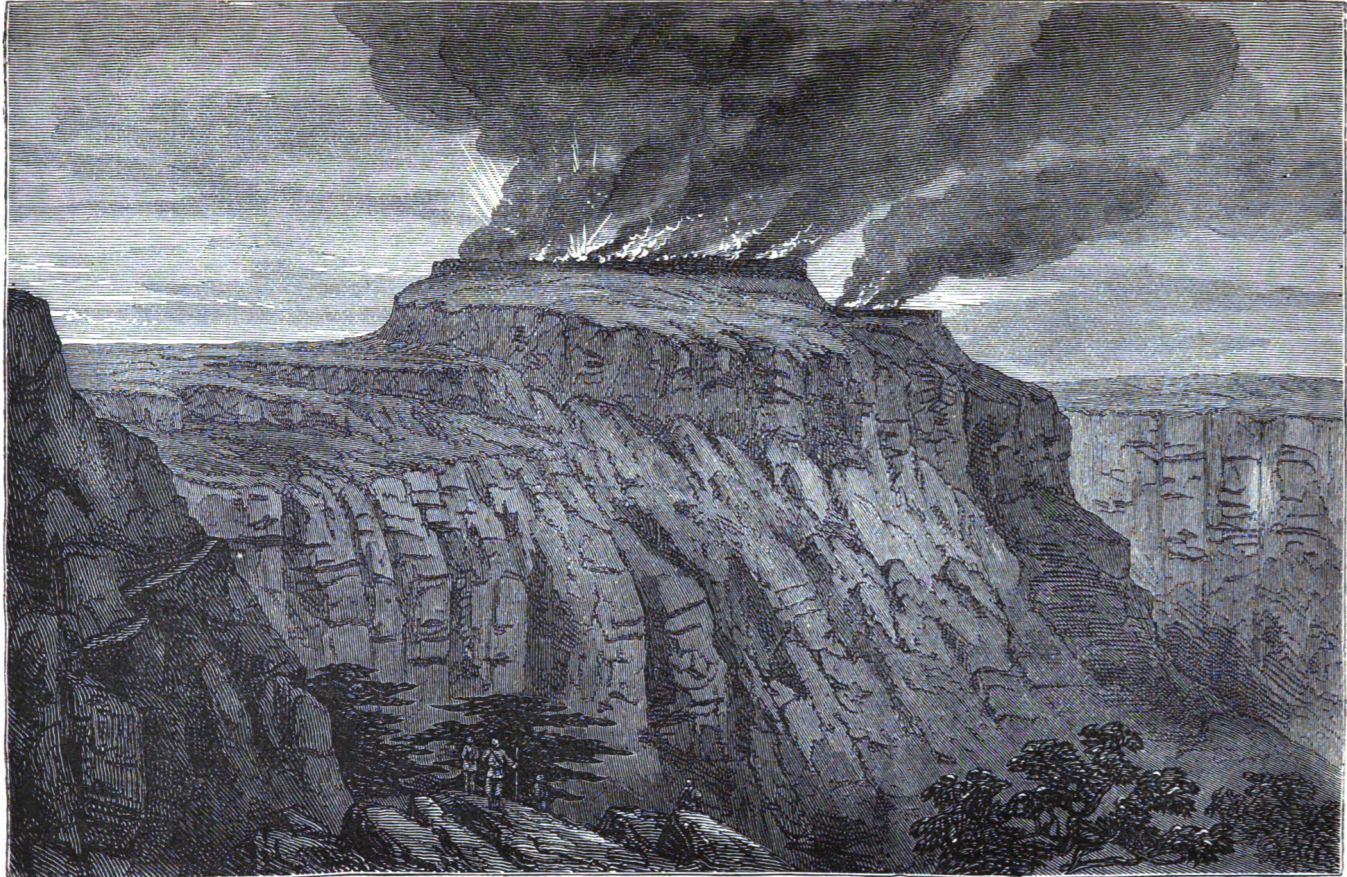
The burning of Magdala

The bombardment began with mortars, rockets and artillery. Infantry units then opened fire, covering the Royal Engineers sent to blow up the gates of the fortress. The path lay up a steep boulder-strewn track, on one side of which there was a sheer drop and on the other a perpendicular cliff face, leading to the main gateway, known as the Koket-Bir, which included thick timber doors set into a 15-foot-long (4.6 m) stone archway. Each side of the gate was protected by a thorn-and-stake hedge. After this gate was a further uphill path to a second fortified gateway, which led onto the final plateau or amba.

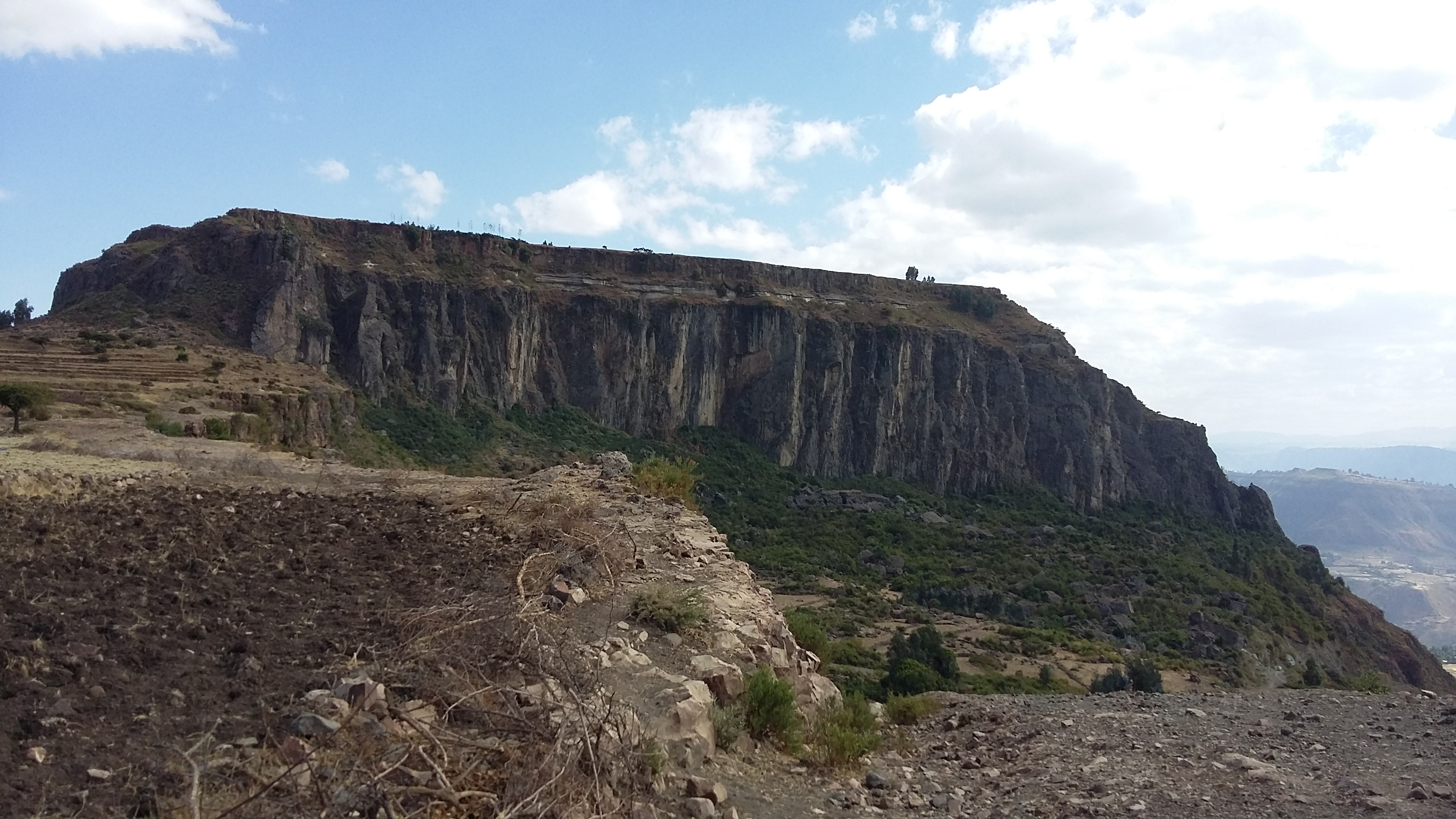
The exact location where Emperor Tewodros II was found dead

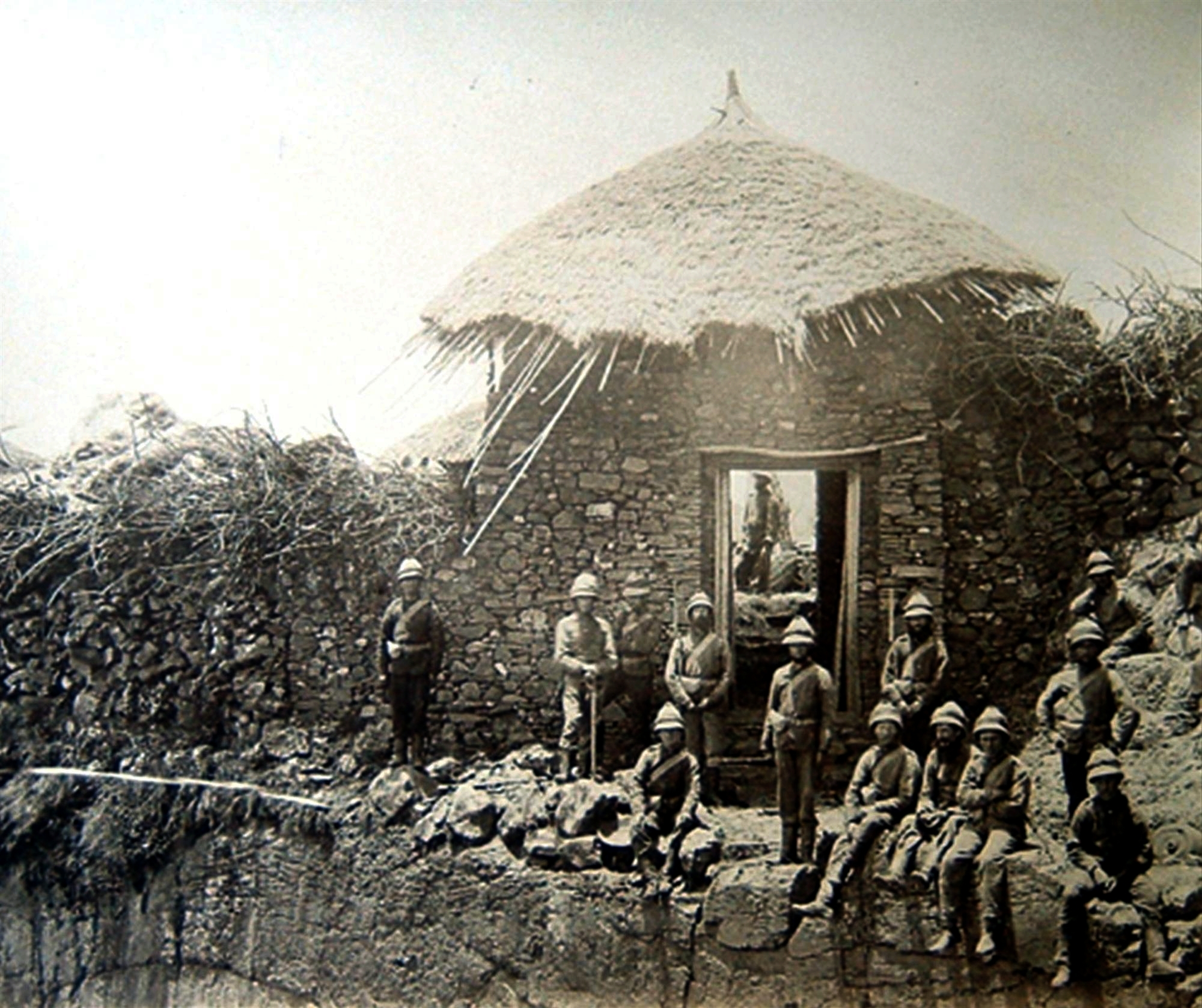
Magdala, sentry post over gate

On reaching the gate there was a pause in the advance, as it was discovered the engineer unit had forgotten their powder kegs and scaling ladders and were ordered to return for them. General Staveley was not happy at any further delay and ordered the 33rd Regiment to continue the attack. Several officers and the men of the 33rd, along with an officer from the Royal Engineers, parted from the main force and, after climbing the cliff face, found their way blocked by a thorny hedge over a wall. Private James Bergin, a very tall man, used his bayonet to cut a hole in the hedge and Drummer Michael Magner climbed onto his shoulders and through the gap in the hedge and dragged Private Bergin up behind him as Ensign Conner and Corporal Murphy helped shove from below. Bergin kept up a rapid rate of fire on the Koket-Bir as Magner dragged more men through the gap in the hedge.

As more men poured through and opened fire, advancing with their bayonets fixed, the defenders withdrew through the second gate. The party rushed the Koket-bir before it was fully closed and then took the second gate, breaking through to the amba. Ensign Wynter scrambled up onto the top of the second gate and fixed the 33rd Regimental Colours to show the plateau had been taken. Private Bergin and Drummer Magner were later awarded the Victoria Cross for their part in the action.

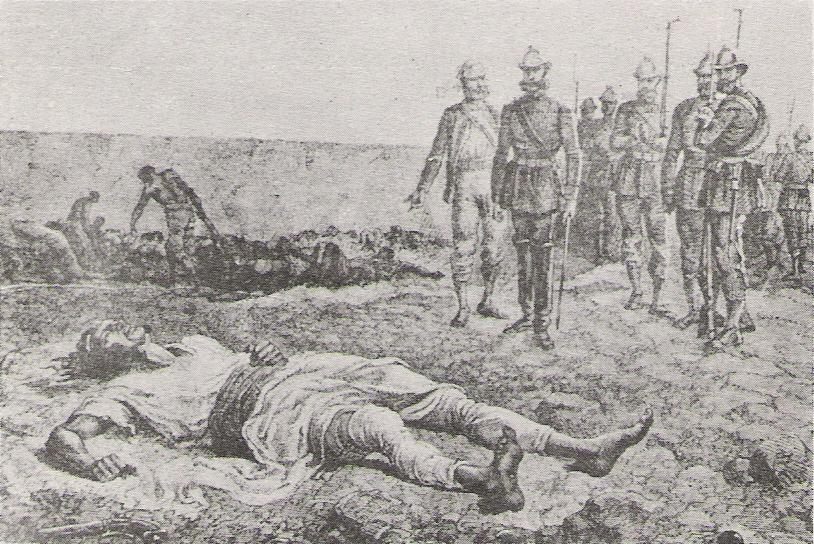
The End of King Tewodros II (The Illustrated London News, 1868)

Tewodros II was found dead inside the second gate, having shot himself with a pistol that had been a gift from Queen Victoria. When his death was announced, all resistance ceased. His body was cremated and buried inside the church by the priests. The church was guarded by soldiers from the 33rd Regiment although, according to Henry M. Stanley, looted of "an infinite variety of gold, and silver and brass crosses" along with filigree works and rare tabots.

=== Succession and power struggle ===
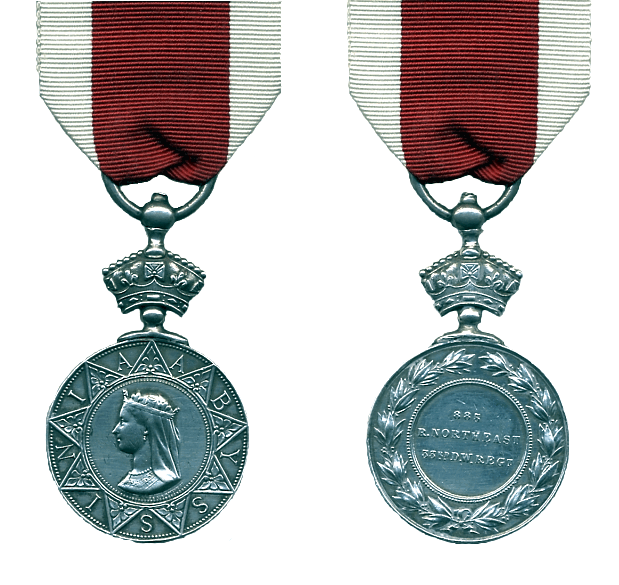
Abyssinian War Medal

Magdala was formerly in the territory of the Muslim Gallas (Oromo) tribes, who had long ago taken it from the Amhara people; however Tewodros had won it back from them some years before. Two rival Galla queens, Werkait and Mostiat, who had both allied themselves with the British, claimed control of the conquered fortress as a reward. Napier much preferred to hand Magdala over to the Christian ruler of Lasta, Wagshum Gobeze, because if he were in control of the fortress, Gobeze would be able to halt the Muslim Gallas' advance and assume responsibility for over 30,000 Christian refugees from Tewodros' camp. Yet as Gobeze was unresponsive to these overtures, much preferring to acquire Tewodros' cannons, and the two Galla queens could not reach an arrangement, Napier decided to destroy the fortress.

For the victory in the campaign, Lieutenant-General Napier was ennobled by Queen Victoria, and became Baron Napier of Magdala. Officers and soldiers who took part in the campaign were awarded the Abyssinian War Medal.

After the withdrawal of the British, fighting for the succession to Tewodros' throne raged in Ethiopia from 1868 to 1872. Eventually, it was Dajamach Kassai of Tigray, not least because of the British weapons that had been handed over to him by the withdrawing Magdala expedition, who was able to expand his power and prevail over his rivals. In July 1871, he won the Battle of Assam, near Adwa, even though he had far fewer troops, defeating his old rival Wagshum Gobeze of Lasta. Kassai had himself crowned Emperor of Ethiopia, taking the name Yohannes IV.

Tewodros had asked his wife, the Empress Tiruwork Wube, in the event of his death, to put his son, Prince Alemayehu, under the protection of the British. This decision was apparently made in fear that his life would be taken by any aspirant for the empire of Abyssinia. In accordance with these wishes, Alemayehu was taken to London, where he was presented to Queen Victoria, who took a liking to the young boy. Alemayehu later studied at Cheltenham College, Rugby School and the Royal Military Academy Sandhurst. However, both the Queen and Napier were later concerned with the subsequent development of the young prince, who became increasingly lonely, unhappy and depressed during this time. In 1879, the prince died of illness at the age of 19. He was buried near St George's Chapel, Windsor Castle with a funeral plaque placed to his memory by Queen Victoria.

One of the British soldiers, John Kirkham, stayed in Ethiopia and ultimately served as an advisor to Yohannes IV. He was instrumental in training Ethiopian troops to Western military standards, raising and drilling what became known as the Emperor's Disciplined Force. Kirkham's troops played a major role in the defeat of Yohannes' rival for the Ethiopian crown, Wagshum Gobeze, fighting with conspicuous success in the Battle of Assam on 11 July 1871. Kirkham had sacrificed the right to British protection by taking service with Yohannes, something which came back to haunt him when he was imprisoned in Massawa by Egyptian forces during the Ethiopian–Egyptian War. Despite being discovered by a group of British sailors from HMS Teazer, the sailors were not permitted to aid in his liberation. Kirkham died in captivity in 1876.

== Looting ==
On 19 April, having first blown up the fortress and burned the city, Napier commenced the return march. A crowd of soldiers tore the clothes from Tewodros' body whilst the British plundered the fort. A lock of Tewodros' hair had been cut from his head by Captain C. F. James. According to historian Richard Pankhurst, fifteen elephants and almost two hundred mules were required to bear the loot across the Bashilo River to the nearby Dalanta Plain. A grand review was held, and then an auction of the loot; the money raised was distributed amongst the troops and no written list was made of who purchased the various items. The looted items had subsequently been bought by Richard Holmes, a curator from the British Museum, who accompanied the military expedition as the museum's archaeologist.

The jewelry and elaborately embroidered cotton dress of Tewodros' queen, Queen Woyzaro Terunesh, were sent to the care of Sir Stafford Northcote at the India Office in London. The dress is now part of the Victoria & Albert Museum's collection.

Many looted objects, cultural artefacts and art objects found their way into state and private collections, family possessions, and the hands of ordinary soldiers. Because of the presence of Richard Holmes, over 300 manuscripts were acquired on the spot by the British Museum. In addition to these a large selection of textual materials made their way into the collections of the Bodleian Library in Oxford University, while a few went to the Royal Library in Windsor Castle and to smaller British collections. Other looted objects ended up in the Victoria and Albert Museum, the Museum of Mankind and the National Army Museum. The Bodleian Library holds multiple manuscripts many explicitly catalogued as originating from the Church of Medhane 'Alam at Magdala in 1868

The scientific acquisitions and expropriated articles of the Magdala expedition are credited with stimulating and promoting an interest in the history and culture of Ethiopia within Europe, laying the foundations for modern Ethiopian Studies, and also for the research on the ancient Kingdom of Aksum.

=== Restitution efforts ===
From time to time, some of the looted treasure has been returned to Ethiopia; since 1999, the AFROMET (Association For the Return of the Madgala Ethiopian Treasures) campaign has been lobbying for the further return of other looted objects. The campaigns were also assisted by Richard Pankhurst, who wrote letters to independent news sources in London on the looting at Maqdala. The British Museum currently holds 11 tabots in storage; their return has become a focal point of restitution campaigns.

Returned items include:

- An edition of the Kebra Nagast, along with an icon of a picture of Jesus wearing the crown of thorns, returned to Emperor Yohannes IV in the 1870s
- Lady Valerie Meux's collection of Ethiopian manuscripts were bequeathed in 1902 to Emperor Menelik II in her will; however, shortly following her death in 1910, this was overturned.
- One of the two looted crowns of Tewodros was returned to Empress Zawditu in 1924, but the more valuable gold crown was retained by the Victoria and Albert Museum.
- In the 1960s, Queen Elizabeth II returned Tewodros' royal cap and seal to Emperor Haile Selassie while on a state visit to Ethiopia.
- In 2019, the National Army Museum announced the return of a lock of Tewodros' hair, taken after his death in battle.
- In 2021, numerous items including a Coptic Bible, crosses, imperial shield, a set of horn beakers and a crown were bought by a British non-profit organization, The Scheherazade Foundation, to return them to Ethiopia. The items were purchased from a British auction house and a private collector in Belgium and were described as 'the single most significant heritage restitution in Ethiopia's history'.
- In 2023, artefacts including a lock of Prince Alemayehu's hair was handed over to the Ethiopian ambassador to the UK in London. Other artefacts handed over included the Holly Tabot tablet of 'Medhane’Alem, three silver cups with bronze plating, and a shield.

The Ethiopian government has called for the remains of Prince Alemayehu to be returned to Ethiopia from his burial place in Windsor Castle.

Andrew Heavens, a journalist and author, published The Prince and the Plunder: How Britain Stole Ethiopia’s Treasure in 2023.

== See also ==
- Sebastopol (cannon)
- The Magdala

== Works cited ==
- Brereton, J. M.; Savoury, A. C. S. (1993). History of the Duke of Wellington's Regiment. ISBN 0-9521552-0-6.
- Ferguson, Niall. Empire: How Britain made the Modern World.
