= Herbert William Wood =

British army officer

Herbert William Wood FRGS
- Born: 17 July 1837; India
- Died: 8 October 1879 (aged 42); Chingleput, India
- Military career
- Allegiance: East India Company; United Kingdom
- Branch: Madras Army; British Army
- Service years: 1855–1879
- Rank: Major
- Conflicts: Indian Rebellion of 1857; British expedition to Abyssinia

Major Herbert William Wood FRGS (17 July 1837 – 8 October 1879) of the Royal Engineers was an English army officer and geographer.

== Life ==
=== Origins ===
Herbert William Wood, son of Lieutenant-colonel Herbert William Wood of the Madras Native Infantry, was born in India on 17 July 1837. Educated at Cheltenham College, he joined the military college of the East India Company at Addiscombe in February 1854, received a commission as second lieutenant in the Madras Engineers on 20 September 1855, and, after the usual course of professional instruction at Chatham, arrived at Madras on 26 October 1857.

=== Military career ===
Wood was at once posted to the Sagar field division under Major-general Whitlock acting against the Mutineers, and was present at the affairs of Jhigan on 10 April 1858 and Kabrai, at the Battle of Banda on 19 April, the capture of Kirwi on 6 June, the action in front of Chitra Kote, the forcing of the Panghati Pass, and subsequent action. He was promoted to be lieutenant on 27 August 1858, and continued to do duty with the column until March 1859, receiving the medal for the campaign.

After employment as executive engineer in the public works department in the North-West Provinces, Wood was transferred to Madras in 1860. He was promoted to be captain on 15 January 1864. He served as field engineer in the Abyssinian Campaign from January to June 1868, succeeding Captain Chrystie in charge of the works at Zulla, was thanked in despatches, and received the war medal. In December 1872 he was appointed to Vizagapatam, and on 24 August of the following year he was promoted to be major.

=== Writing ===
Obtaining three years' furlough, Wood accompanied the Grand Duke Constantine's expedition, sent under the auspices of the Imperial Russian Geographical Society to examine the Amu Darya. He published in 1876 the results of his travels in an octavo volume entitled The Shores of Lake Aral, which attracted attention at the time, and which treats on the difficulties with which the Russians then had to contend in Central Asia.

=== Death and legacy ===
Wood returned to India in June 1876, but, after serving in the Madras Presidency in a bad state of health, he was seized with paralysis and died on 8 October 1879 at Chingleput. Wood was a Fellow of the Royal Geographical Society and of the Royal and Imperial Russian Geographical societies, and a corresponding member of the Society of Geography of Geneva. He issued at Geneva in 1875 a short account in French of the bed of the Amu Darya.

== Honours ==
- Indian Mutiny Medal (1858)
- Abyssinian War Medal (1869)
