= Sebastopol (mortar) =

Sebastopol Artillery Mortar
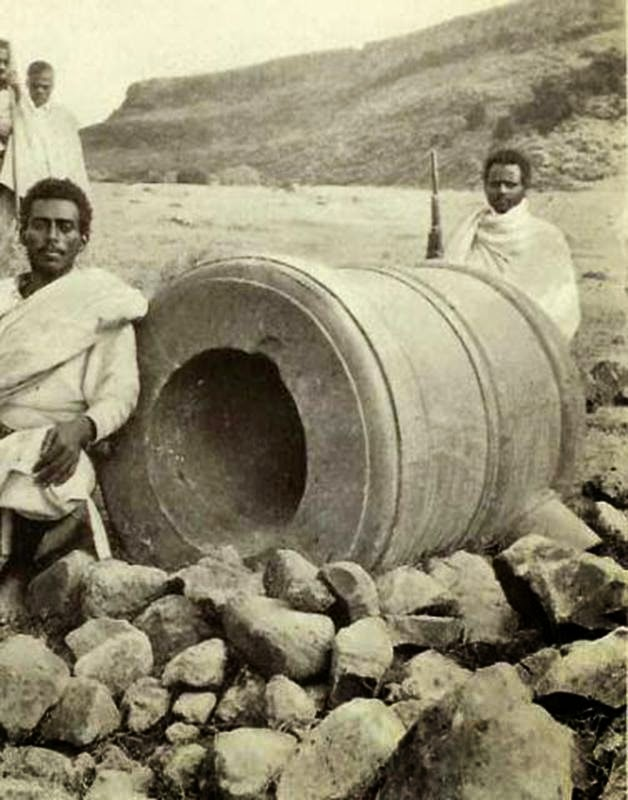
- The Sebastopol in the Wollo Province
- Interactive map of Sebastopol Artillery Mortar
- Location: Addis Ababa, Ethiopia
- Coordinates: 9°1′37.37″N 38°45′6.03″E
- Type: Monument
- Material: Bronze
- Completion date: 1868

Sebastopol was the name of a large artillery mortar commissioned by the Ethiopian Emperor Tewodros II (1818–1868). The name was taken from the Crimean town of Sevastopol, the site of a battle during the Crimean War. The mortar weighed approximately 6.7 tons, and was capable of firing off half-ton artillery rounds.

In an attempt to speed up industrialisation, Tewodros had welcomed British and French officials and a group of German missionaries into his kingdom. In 1866, following a series of diplomatic misunderstandings and the king's increasingly erratic behaviour, all foreigners were taken prisoner. Tewodros ordered the artisan-missionaries, led by Theophilus Waldmeier, to construct a brass cannon capable of firing a 1,000-pound (450 kg) cannon ball. It took seven months to construct and two furnace were built for the casting. When it was transported to Magdala a special road had to be built. At times 800 men were needed to move it; the 200 mile journey took six months. Meanwhile the British expedition to Abyssinia was sent to free the captives, which resulted in the Battle of Magdala.

Although there are no records of the mortar being used in the battle it has remained half-buried in the ground, on the plateau at Meqedela, near Amba Mariam. Although recent photographic evidence from 2021 suggests that the mortar has been placed on a concrete platform and is no longer buried. A bronze replica has been cast and displayed in the centre of a roundabout at Tewodros Square, Churchill Avenue, Addis Ababa.

== Gallery ==
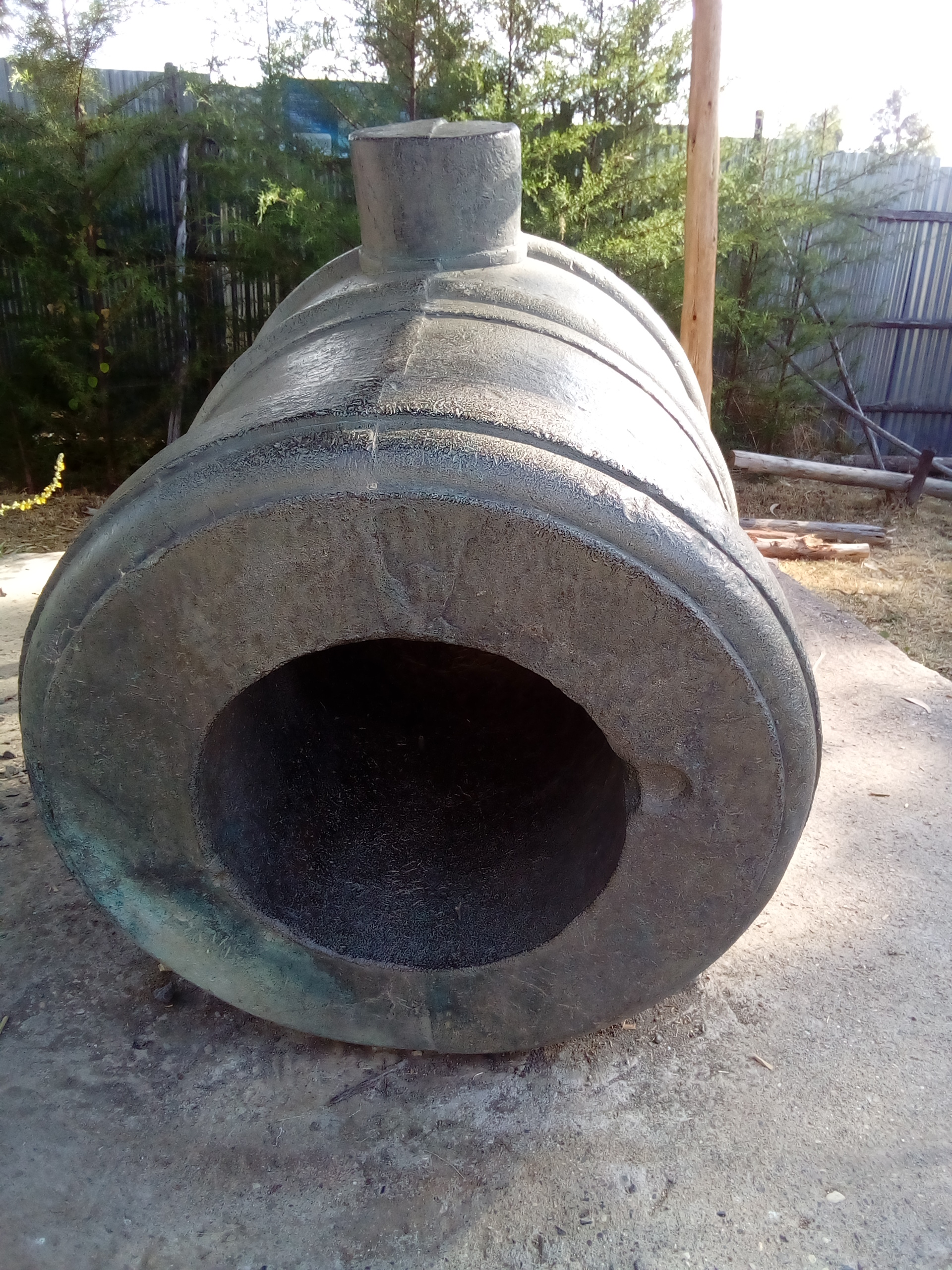
The original mortar

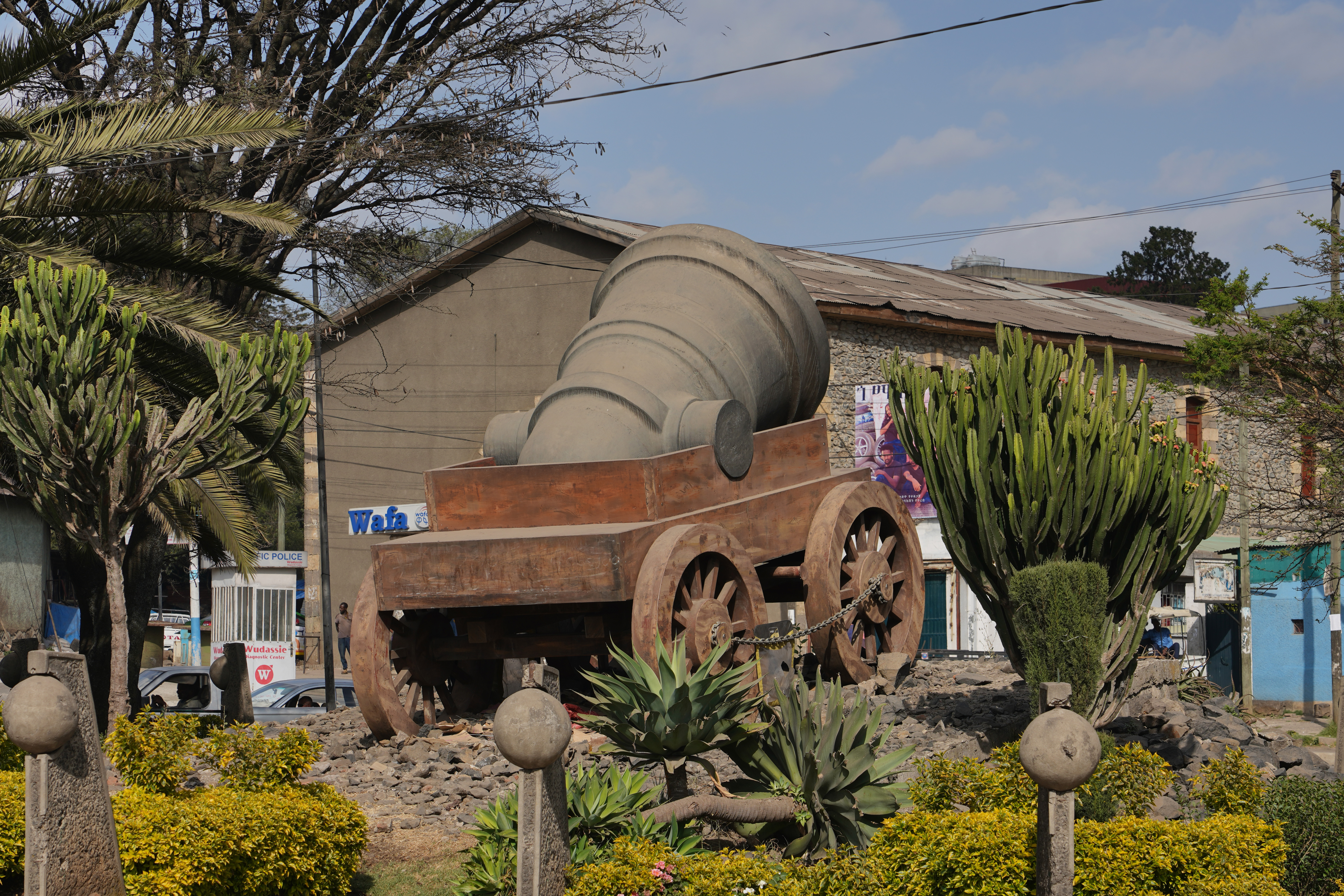
The mortar monument on Tewodros Square, Addis Ababa

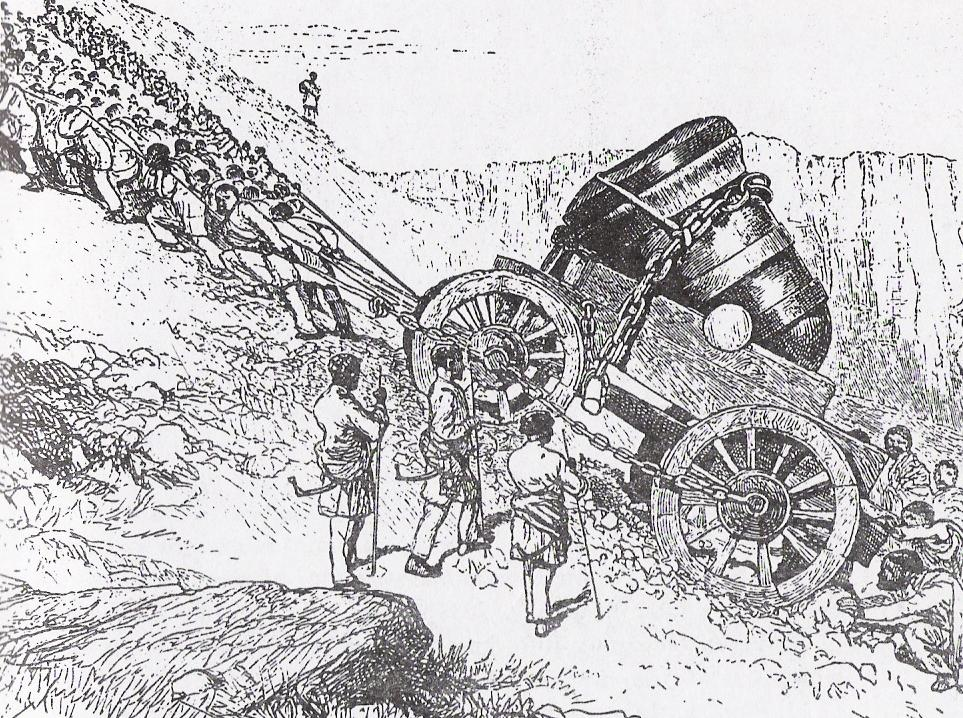
Ethiopian soldiers dragging the mortar
