= Charles Augustus Goodfellow =

Recipient of the Victoria Cross

Lieutenant-General Charles Augustus Goodfellow VC CB
- Born: 27 November 1836; Essex, England
- Died: 1 September 1915 (aged 78); Leamington Spa, Warwickshire, England
- Burial place: Royal Leamington Spa Cemetery
- Military career
- Allegiance: United Kingdom
- Branch: Bengal Army; British Army
- Rank: Lieutenant-General
- Units: Bombay Engineers; Royal Engineers
- Conflicts: Indian Mutiny; Abyssinian War
- Awards: Victoria Cross; Order of the Bath

Lieutenant-General Charles Augustus Goodfellow VC CB (27 November 1836 – 1 September 1915) was a British soldier and recipient of the Victoria Cross, the highest and most prestigious award for gallantry in the face of the enemy that can be awarded to British and Commonwealth forces.

== Victoria Cross ==
Charles Augustus Goodfellow was born in Essex on 27 November 1836. On 6 October 1859 Goodfellow was a 22 year old officer of the Bombay Engineers, serving as a lieutenant in 4 Field Company of the Bombay Sappers, during the Indian Mutiny when the following deed took place for which he was awarded the VC:

For gallant conduct at the attack on the Fort of Beyt, on the 6th of October, 1859. On that occasion, a soldier of the 28th Regiment was shot under the walls of the Fort. Lieutenant Goodfellow rushed, under the walls, under a sharp fire of matchlocks, and bore off the body of the soldier, who was then dead, but whom he at first supposed to be wounded only.

== Later service ==
Goodfellow later transferred to the Royal Engineers serving in the British Expedition to Abyssinia where he was mentioned in dispatches as follows:

Captain Goodfellow, next in seniority, whose services at Zoulla in constructing the pier have already been noticed, was the chief engineer on the highlands, and displayed great intelligence and activity in every duty throughout the operations.

Following the successful conclusion of the expedition, Goodfellow was assigned to conduct an archaeological excavation at Adulis, the ancient harbor of the Kingdom of Aksum, on behalf of the British Museum. Goodfellow uncovered the remains of a building and stone columns, fragments of marble and alabaster on which crude drawings had been made, pottery and coins. These items were later sent to the British Museum. Goodfellow later achieved the rank of lieutenant general, and was made a Companion of the Order of the Bath. He died at Leamington Spa on 1 September 1915, aged 78.

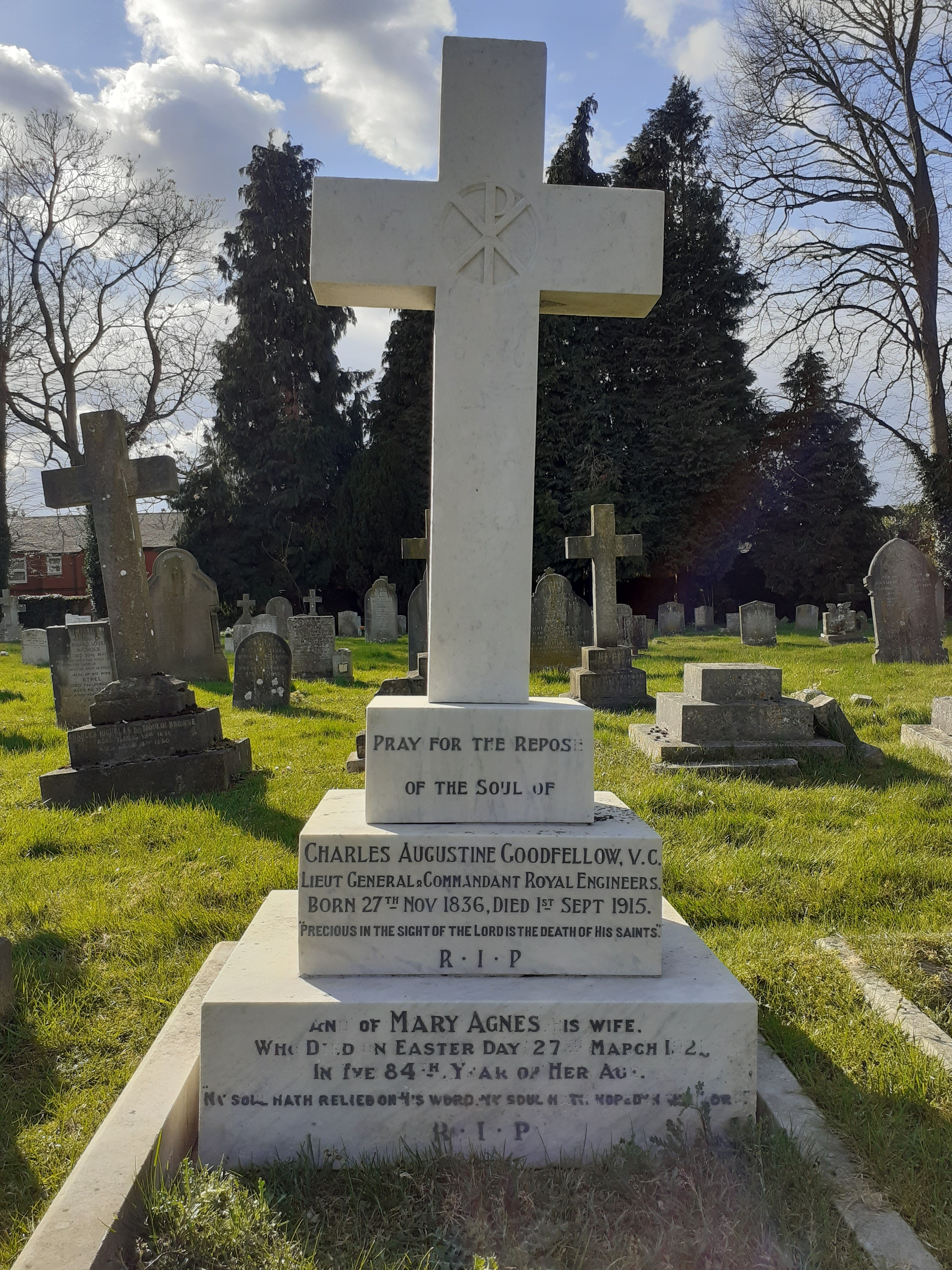
Goodfellow's grave in Leamington Spa Cemetery

== The medal ==
Goodfellow's Victoria Cross is displayed at the Royal Engineers Museum, Gillingham, England.
