= Association For the Return of the Magdala Ethiopian Treasures =

Legal Society

AFROMET
- Type: Legal Society
- Headquarters: Addis Ababa, Ethiopia
- Location(s): Ethiopia and United Kingdom
- Website: http://www.afromet.org/

AFROMET (Association For the Return of the Magdala Ethiopian Treasures) is an organisation seeking the return of looted treasures to Ethiopia.

== History ==
After the Battle of Magdala in 1868, the victorious British expedition looted a great many books and artifacts not only from the city of Maqdala but also from the Ethiopian Christian church of Medhane Alem.

According to Henry M. Stanley, the loot included "an infinite variety of gold, and silver and brass crosses", as well as "heaps of parchment royally illuminated". Fifteen elephants and almost two hundred mules were required to bear the loot to the nearby Dalanta Plain for auction. Richard Holmes, then Assistant in the British Museum's Department of Manuscripts, purchased 350 manuscripts and various solid goods, such as the crown of the Abun (Head of the Ethiopian Church).

Most of the loot is still missing; some of it is known to be held in public collections such as the British Museum. For example, a manuscript in the Bodleian Library bears a pencil note: "taken from a church at Maqdala in 1868".

In the mid-20th century, world law and opinion gradually came to ban looting, most notably codified in the Fourth Geneva Convention. A problem remained as to the status of goods looted previously. A number of efforts to return cultural items grew up around the world, of which AFROMET is one.

== Progress ==
The Ethiopian government started requesting the return of the looted goods within three years of the battle, with some small success. However, progress in general was slow.

Lady Valerie Meux bequeathed her collection of Ethiopian manuscripts to Emperor Menilek II, but her will was overturned shortly after her death in 1910, on the grounds that Menilek was dead when Lady Meux died (which, in fact, was untrue; he died in 1913 and in any case he had heirs).

The British Government occasionally returned some of the looted items. In 1965, Queen Elizabeth II returned to Emperor Haile Selassie I the royal cap and seal of Tewodros II.

AFROMET was formed to lobby systematically for the repatriation of the objects, using legal means and public pressure. So far 10 items have been returned by private donors including a hand-written Book of Psalms, two Tabots and a shield. More than 460 items are still being claimed.
