= Battle of Dabarki =

Battle between the Ethiopian Empire and the province of Egypt

Coordinates: 30.51°N 30.87°E

- Part of Ethiopian–Ottoman border conflict
Date	1848
Location	Dabarki, Sudan
Result	Egyptian victory

Belligerents
Ethiopian Empire	Egypt

Commanders and leaders
Kassa Hailu (WIA)	Khalid Khusraw Pasha

Strength
16,000 spearmen	800 riflemen 2 cannons

Casualties and losses
Heavy	Light

The Battle of Dabarki, also known as the Battle of Dabarqi, was a military engagement fought between the Ethiopian Empire and the province of Egypt in 1848. The battle was a heavy defeat for the Ethiopians and would spur the modernization of the Ethiopian army.

== History ==
In the late 1840s, Kassa Hailu decided strengthen his position by damaging his major adversary, namely the Muslim power Egypt, then a nominal province of the Ottoman Empire. Invading through Ethiopia's western frontier, the Ethiopian army advanced into the Egyptian-controlled Sudan and occupied Metemma without resistance.

In March 1848, Kassa and his force of 16,000 warriors attacked Dabarki, a fortified post garrisoned with a battalion of 800 Egyptian troops and two cannons. Kassa led his men in a frontal charge against the Egyptian fort and the Ethiopians suffered heavy losses by the accurate musket fire and the cannons, Kassa himself was slightly wounded during the assault. After this he led the remnants of his army back to Begemder.

The battle at Dabarki greatly affected Kassa's military thinking, inspiring him to modernize the Ethiopian army with modern artillery and firearms. Several sources have described the battle as the first significant defeat in Tewodros' military career.
