= Abyssinian War Medal =

British Empire military decoration of 1869

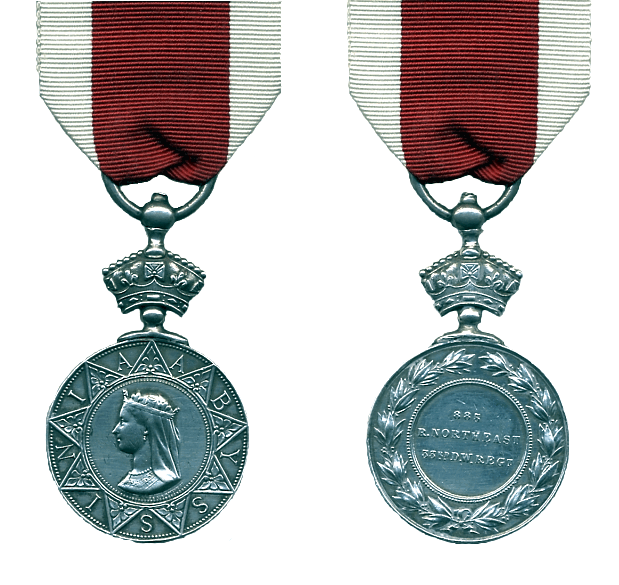
- Obverse and reverse of the medal
- Type: Campaign medal
- Awarded for: Campaign Service
- Presented by: United Kingdom
- Eligibility: British and British Indian Army
- Campaigns: British expedition to Abyssinia, 1867–1868
- Established: 1 March 1869
- Ribbon bar of the medal

Precedence
- Next (higher): New Zealand War Service Medal
- Next (lower): Canada General Service Medal

The Abyssinian War Medal was a campaign medal of the United Kingdom awarded to veterans of the British expedition to Abyssinia, the 1867–1868 war between the Ethiopian Empire (then commonly known as "Abyssinia") and the British Empire. The medal was established in 1869.

Around 14,000 medals were awarded in total. 12,000 were awarded to the British and Indian armies and 1,981 to the Royal Navy. In addition to members of the Naval Brigade who accompanied the expedition, awards were made to the crews of the ships stationed off the Ethiopian coast during the campaign. Veterans who served between 4 October 1867 and 19 April 1868 were eligible to receive the award.

The British expedition to Abyssinia was a punitive expedition against emperor Tewodros II of Ethiopia (r. 1855–1868) in response to his imprisonment of missionaries and British government officials. The expedition required the transport of a sizable military force over hundreds of miles of mountainous terrain without any road system. The expedition ended in victory for the British, who captured the Ethiopian capital and freed all the prisoners.

== Description ==
The medal is silver and 1.25 inches (32 mm) in diameter. It was designed by Joseph and Alfred Wyon, and struck at the Royal Mint. Each medal was unique in that the recipient's name and unit were embossed on the reverse. This feature required that the dies for the reverse had a removable centre, so each recipient's name and unit could be impressed, with each medal minted individually. Most medals awarded to Indian troops had impressed naming.

The obverse bears the left-facing effigy of Queen Victoria wearing a diadem. Around the edge is a stylised border with indentions; between the indentions are the letters ABYSSINIA. The bust is similar to that on the New Zealand War Medal issued in the same year.

The reverse has a blank central space for the recipient's name and unit, surrounded by a laurel wreath.

The medal is held by a ring suspension attached to a crown surmounting the medal. The medal is borne upon a crimson ribbon 1.5 inches (38 mm) wide, with white borders.
