= Herbie Wood =

Australian rules footballer

Personal information
- Full name: Herbert Sydney Wood
- Born: 8 August 1920
- Died: 16 August 2001 (aged 81)
- Height: 165 cm (5 ft 5 in)
- Weight: 75 kg (165 lb)

Playing career^{1}
Years	Club	Games (Goals)
1944–45	North Melbourne	10 (1)
- ^{1} Playing statistics correct to the end of 1945.

Herbert Sydney Wood (8 August 1920 – 16 August 2001) was an Australian rules footballer who played with North Melbourne in the Victorian Football League (VFL).
