= British expedition to Abyssinia =

1867–1868 war between the British and Ethiopian Empires

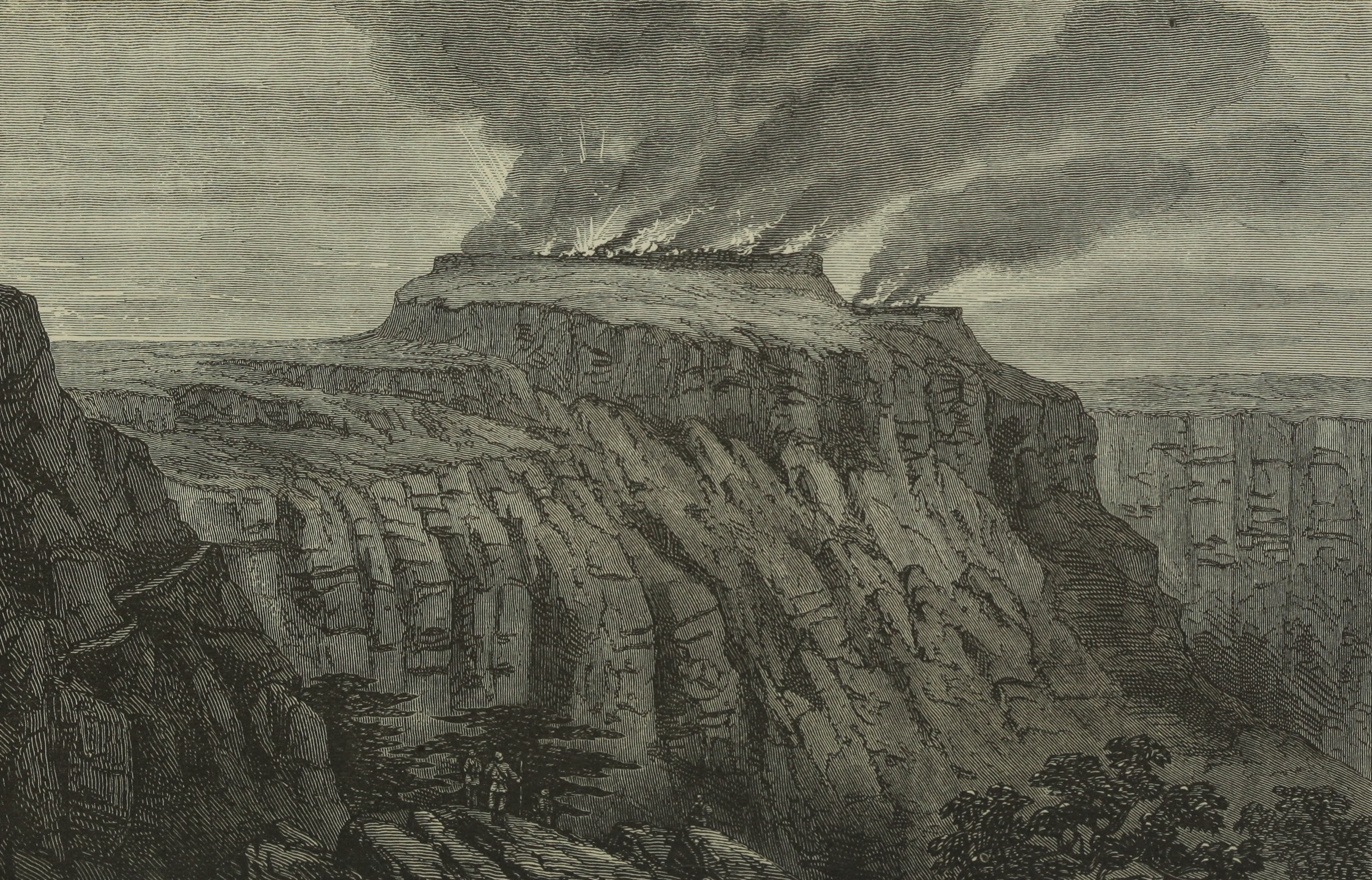
- The burning fortress of Magdala
Date	4 December 1867 – 13 May 1868
Location	From Annesley Bay to Magdala, Ethiopia
Result	British victory: Release of European hostages; Suicide of Emperor Tewodros II; Destruction of Magdala fortress

Belligerents
United Kingdom: India; Ethiopian rebels	Ethiopian Empire

Commanders and leaders
(British Raj) Sir Robert Napier Dejazmach Kassa Mercha Wagshum Gobaze	Tewodros II †

Strength
13,000; 26,000 camp followers	≈4,000

Casualties and losses
33 British dead; 512 Indians dead; 333–700 wounded	1,900 killed and wounded

The British expedition to Abyssinia was a rescue mission and punitive expedition carried out in 1868 by the armed forces of the British Empire against the Ethiopian Empire (also known at the time as Abyssinia). Emperor Tewodros II of Ethiopia, then often referred to by the anglicized name Theodore, imprisoned several missionaries and two representatives of the British government in an attempt to force the British government to comply with his requests for military assistance. The punitive expedition launched by the British in response required the transportation of a sizeable military force hundreds of kilometres across mountainous terrain lacking any road system. The formidable obstacles to the action were overcome by the commander of the expedition, General Robert Napier, who captured the Ethiopian capital, and rescued all the hostages.

Historian Harold G. Marcus described the action as "one of the most expensive affairs of honour in history."

== Background ==
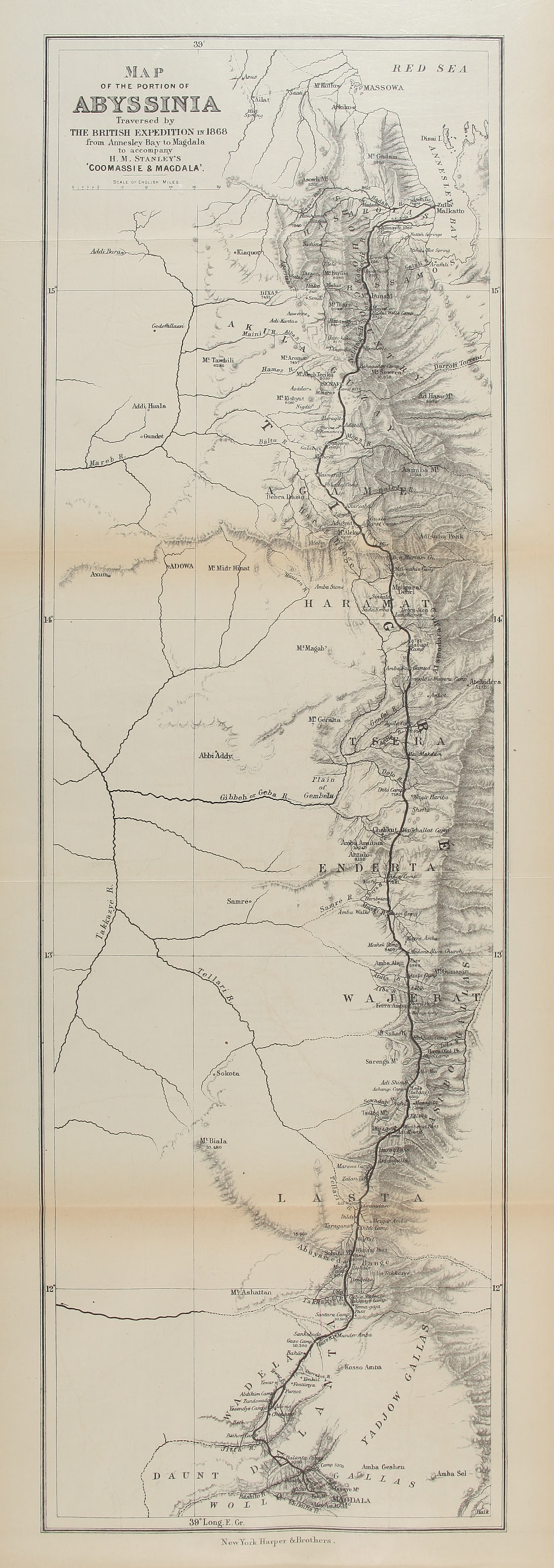
The expedition route through Abyssinia

By October 1862 Emperor Tewodros's position as ruler had become precarious: much of Ethiopia was in revolt against him, except for a small area stretching from Lake Tana east to his fortress at Magdala. He was engaged in constant military campaigns against a wide array of opponents. Likewise, Abyssinia was also threatened by the encroachment of Islam as Ottoman Turks and Egyptians invaded Ethiopia from the Red Sea and through Sudan. Tewodros wrote to the major powers for help. As Donald Crummey recounts, "Now came the definitive attempt, at the turning point of the Emperor's career. Success might stabilize the internal situation; defeat would pull out the last prop. He proposed to send embassies with the ultimate objective of obtaining military alliances and agreements for technical progress."

Tewodros sent letters to the Russian Empire, Prussia, the Austrian Empire, French Empire and the British Empire. The French government responded with demands on behalf of a Lazarist mission in Hamasien, at the edge of Tewodros's realm; they were the only country known to have responded. A former diplomat has noted that factors beyond simple indifference may have limited the number, forcefulness, and speed of European powers' responses: The letter was in Amharic and was sent to Germany for translation.

Tewodros's letter to Queen Victoria appealed to Christian solidarity in the face of the Islamic expansion occurring throughout the region but this garnered little sympathy. The British Empire's interests in Northeast Africa were not geared towards a Christian "crusade" against Islam but instead, the British sought to cooperate politically, strategically and commercially with the Ottoman Empire, Egypt and the Sudan. This was not only to protect the route to India but also to ensure that the Ottoman Empire continued to act as a buffer against Russia's plans for expansion into Central Asia. Moreover, as a result of the American Civil War, deliveries of cotton from the Confederate States of America to the British textile industry were declining, making the British increasingly dependent on Egyptian-Sudanese cotton. In the view of these interests, the British Foreign Office did not look favourably on supporting Tewodros. The letter was preserved but not answered.

== Hostages ==
The first European to cross Tewodros' path after this lack of a response happened to be Henry Stern, a British missionary. Stern had also mentioned the Emperor's humble origins in a book he had published; although the reference was not intended to be insulting ("the eventful and romantic history of the man, who, from a poor boy, in a reed-built convent became...the conqueror of numerous provinces, and the Sovereign of a great and extensive realm") it proved to be a dangerous mistake. At the time Tewodros was insisting on the truth of his descent from the Solomonic dynasty, and Tewodros expressed his rage in many ways, including having Stern's servants beaten to death, and Stern, together with his assistant, a Mr Rosenthal, were "chained, severely treated, and the latter thrashed on several occasions."

The British consul Charles Duncan Cameron, along with the Abuna Salama III and the group of missionaries based at Gafat, all interceded for the release of the imprisoned pair, and for a while it appeared that their efforts might succeed; but on 2 January 1864 Cameron was seized along with his staff, and all were put in chains. Shortly afterwards, Tewodros ordered most of the Europeans in the royal camp put into chains.

The British government sent Hormuzd Rassam, an ethnic Assyrian Christian from Mesopotamia, to negotiate a solution to this crisis, but "security in Tigre, the King's indecisiveness, and continuing confusion about the envoy's instructions" delayed Rassam's arrival at Tewodros's camp until January 1866. At first, it looked as if Rassam might succeed in the release of the hostages: the Emperor showed him great favour, establishing him at Qorata, a village on the south-eastern shores of Lake Tana, and sending him numerous gifts, and having Cameron, Stern, and the other hostages sent to his encampment.

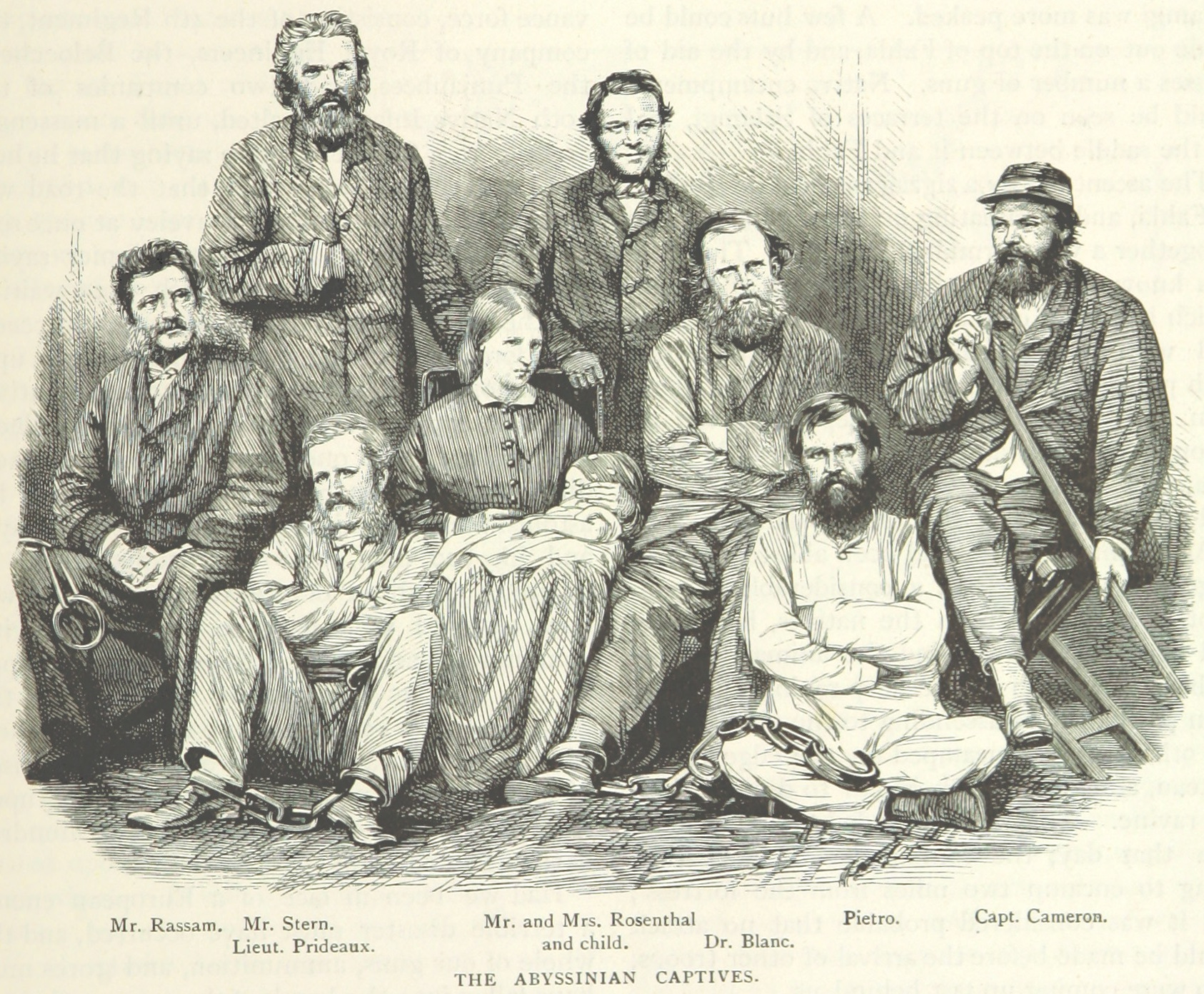
Tewodros' captives

However, about this time C.T. Beke arrived at Massawa, and forwarded letters from the hostages' families to Tewodros, asking for their release. At the least Beke's actions only made Tewodros suspicious. Rassam, writing in his memoirs of the incident, is more direct: "I date the change in the King's conduct towards me, and the misfortunes which eventually befell the members of the Mission and the old captives, from this day." Meanwhile, Emperor Tewodros's behaviour was becoming increasingly erratic, his actions included acts of friendship towards Rassam, paranoid accusations, and sudden violence upon whoever happened to be around him. In the end, Rassam himself was made a prisoner, and one of the missionaries dispatched with the news and Tewodros's latest demands in June 1866. The Emperor eventually moved all of his European prisoners to his fortress on Magdala, and continued to parley with the British until Queen Victoria announced the decision to send a military expedition to rescue the hostages 21 August 1867.

== The campaign ==
=== Planning ===
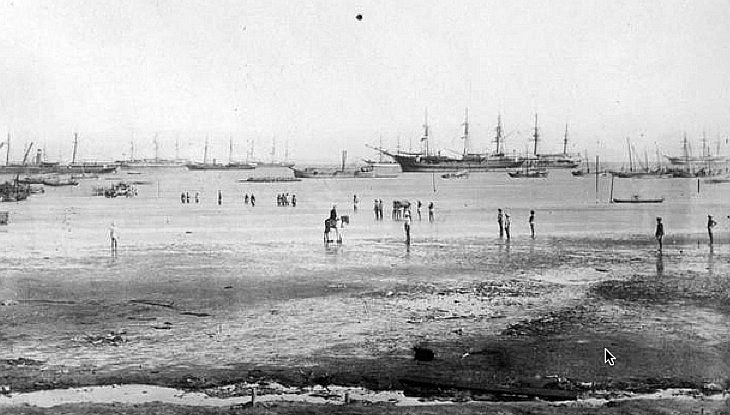
British naval and support ships in the Gulf of Zula, December 1867

In the eyes of Alan Moorehead, "There has never been in modern times a colonial campaign quite like the British expedition to Ethiopia in 1868. It proceeds from first to last with the decorum and heavy inevitability of a Victorian state banquet, complete with ponderous speeches at the end. And yet it was a fearsome undertaking; for hundreds of years the country had never been invaded, and the savage nature of the terrain alone was enough to promote failure." Planning the expedition was difficult for the British as this war was not on the sea. They later mentioned that Ethiopia had "no seaboard; has, consequently, no cities or forts to bombard, no vessels to attack, and no commerce to appropriate."

The task was given to the Bombay Army, and command of the expeditionary force to Lieutenant-General Sir Robert Napier. This was a very unusual decision as it was the first time a campaign had been entrusted to an officer from the Corps of Royal Engineers. It was also a very sensible decision, as the whole campaign would rely on engineering skills to succeed. Intelligence was carefully gathered about Ethiopia while the size of the army was calculated and its needs estimated before the massive effort was begun. Moorehead describes it: "Thus, for example, forty-four trained elephants were to be sent from India to carry the heavy guns on the march, while hiring commissions were dispatched all over the Mediterranean and the Near East to obtain mules and camels to handle the lighter gear. A railway, complete with locomotives and some twenty miles (32 km) of track, was to be laid across the coastal plain, and at the landing place large piers, lighthouses and warehouses were to be built."

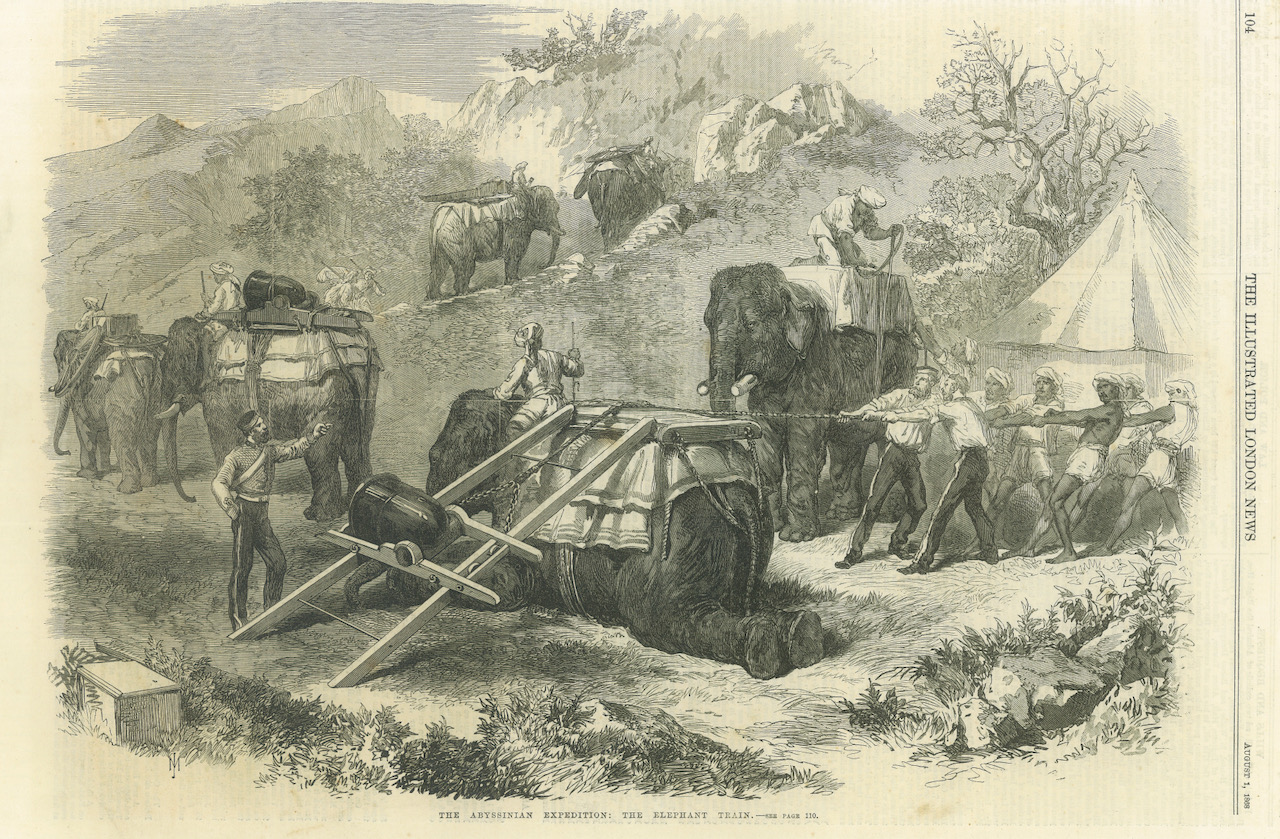
Elephants sent from India to transport the guns and shells for the expedition.

Given the long supply lines and limited resources of their own, the British understood that they were extremely dependent on a constant and reliable local supply of food for the men and forage for the animals. Accordingly, they decided to not plunder along the route but instead to pay for all needed supplies. To this end, the expedition took with it a sizable sum of the most commonly used currency in 19th century Ethiopia, the Maria Theresa Thaler.

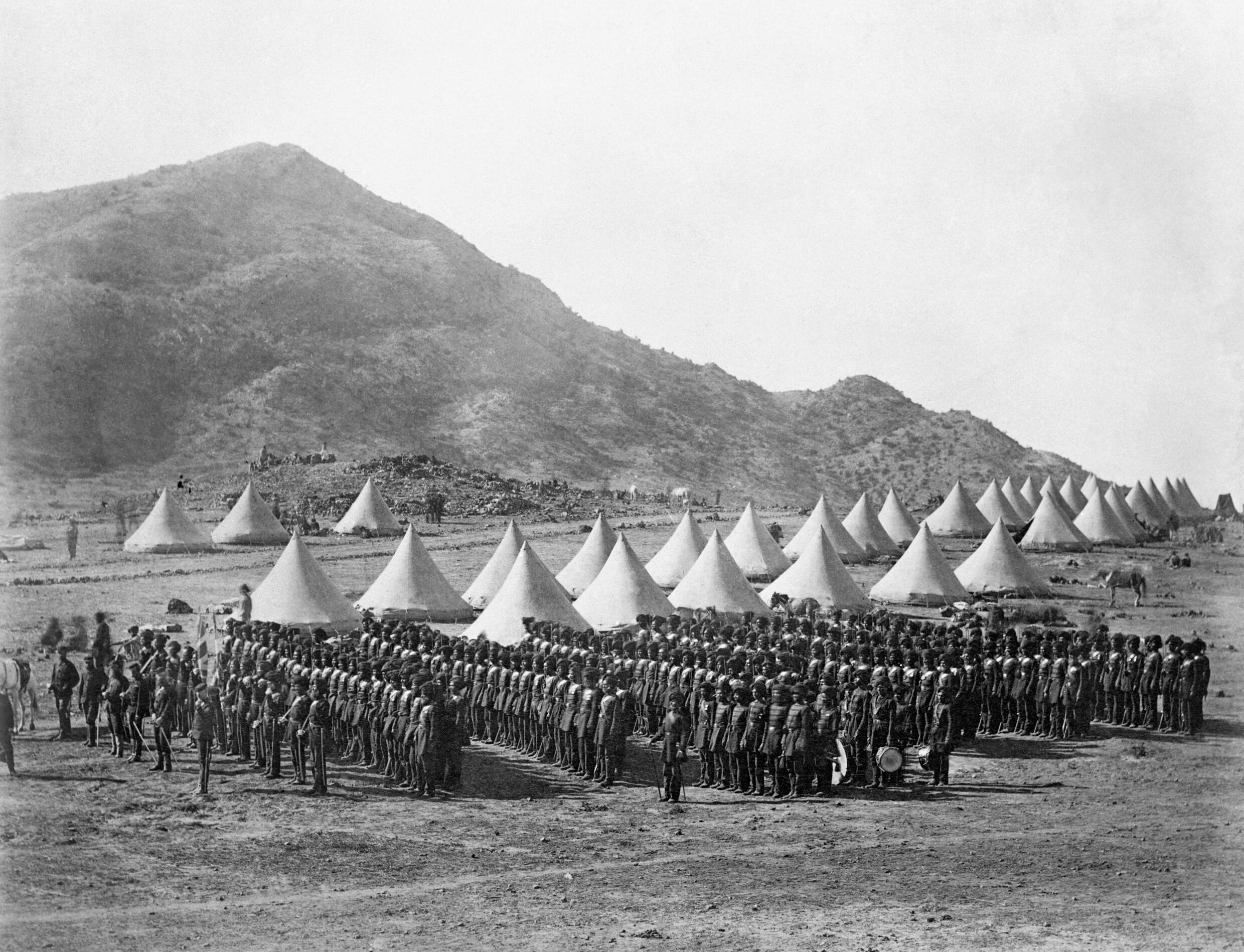
The Baloch Regiment in camp

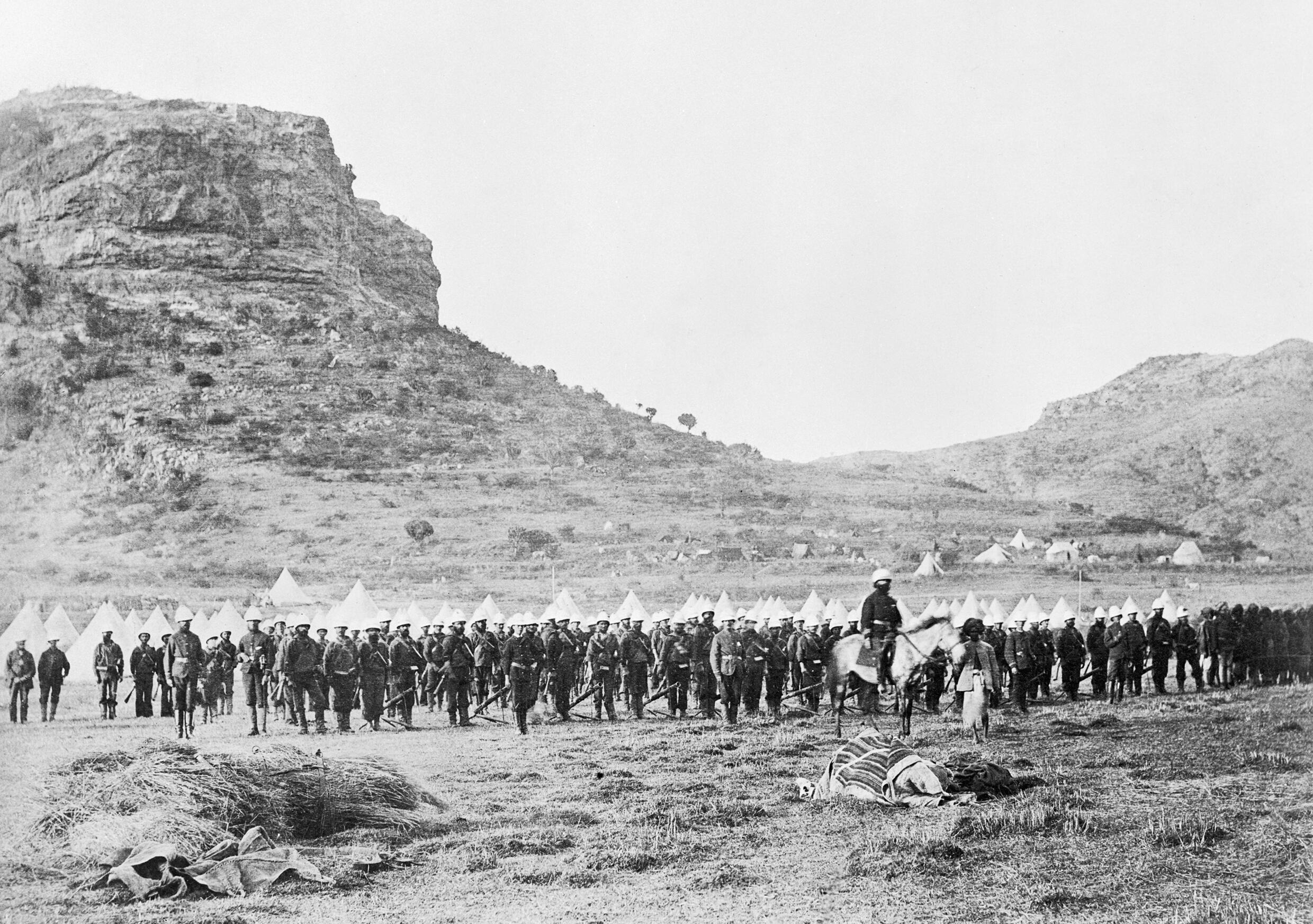
The Naval Brigade

The force consisted of 13,000 British and Indian soldiers, 26,000 camp followers and over 40,000 animals, including the elephants. In addition, there was a sizable contingent of embedded journalists, including Henry Morton Stanley, as well as several European observers, translators, artists and photographers. The force set sail from Bombay in upwards of 280 steam and sailing ships. The advance guard of engineers landed at Zula on the Red Sea, about 30 miles (48 km) south of Massawa, and began to construct a port in mid-October 1867. By the end of the first month they had completed a pier, 700 yards (640 m) long; they completed a second one by the first week of December. The railway was already reaching into the interior, with eight iron girder bridges built. At the same time an advance guard, under Sir William Lockyer Merewether, had pushed up the dry bed of the Kumayli River to the Suru Pass, where again the engineers were busy at work building a road to Senafe 63 miles (101 km) long, rising to 7,400 feet (2,300 m) for the elephants, gun-carriages, and carts. The demand for water was enormous; the Zula camp using 200 tons a day, which was created using condensation from steamship boilers in the harbour. As the force moved inland, wells had to be dug. These tubewells, versions of the Norton tube well technology, were so successful at providing groundwater for the British forces that they became known as "Abyssinian wells" and were widely adopted in England and elsewhere for providing reliable water supplies

From Senafe, Merewether sent out two letters from Lieutenant-General Napier: one to Emperor Tewodros, demanding the release of the hostages (which Rassam intercepted and destroyed, afraid this ultimatum might enrage Tewodros against the prisoners); the other to the people of Ethiopia, proclaiming that he was there purely to free the captives and that he had hostile intentions only towards those who sought to oppose him. Napier arrived at Zula on 2 January 1868, and finished his plan of advance before leaving on 25 January for Senafe.

=== Advance ===
It took the British forces three months to trek over 400 miles (640 km) of mountainous terrain to the foot of the Emperor's fortress at Magdala. At Antalo, Napier parleyed with Dajamach Kassai (later Emperor Yohannes IV), and won his support, which the British needed in their single-minded march to Magdala; without the help, or at least indifference, of the local peoples, the British expedition would have had greater difficulty in reaching its goal deep within the Ethiopian Highlands. On 17 March, the army reached Lake Ashangi, 100 miles (160 km) from their goal, and here, to further lighten their loads, the troops were put on half-rations.

At this point, Emperor Tewodros's strength had already been dissolving. At the beginning of 1865 he controlled little more than Begemder, Wadla, and Delanta (wherein the fortress of Magdala lay). He struggled to keep up the size of his army—which Sven Rubenson points out was his only "instrument of power"—but by mid-1867 defections from his army had reduced its size to 10,000 men. Harold Marcus observes, "For a total cost of about £9,000,000 Napier set out to defeat a man who could muster only a few thousand troops and had long ago ceased to be Ethiopia's leader in anything but title."

The British were also aided by their diplomatic and political agreements with the native population, local potentates, and important provincial princes to protect the march from the coast to Magdala and to provide a reliable supply of food and forage. Additionally, Napier's pronouncement to the governors, the chiefs, the religious orders and the people of Abyssinia read:

It is known to you that Theodorus, King of Abyssinia, detains in captivity the British Council Cameron, the British Envoy Rassam and many others, in violation of the laws of all civilized nations. All friendly persuasion having failed to obtain their release, my Sovereign has commanded me to lead an Army to liberate them. All who befriend the prisoners or assist in their liberation shall be well rewarded, but those who may injure them shall be severely punished. When the time shall arrive for the march of a British Army through your country, bear in mind, People of Abyssinia, that the Queen of England has no unfriendly feelings towards you, and no design against your country or your Liberty.

Your religious establishments, your persons and your property shall be carefully protected.

All supplies required for my soldiers shall be paid for. No peaceable inhabitant shall be molested. The sole object for which the British Force has been sent to Abyssinia is the liberation of Her Majesty's subjects. There is no intention to occupy permanently any portion of the Abyssinian Territory, or to interfere with the government of the country.

The three most powerful Ethiopian princes in the north, Dajamach Kassai of Tigray, Wagshum Gobeze of Lasta and Menelik II of Shewa pledged to cooperate and aid the British Army, thus transforming an apparent invasion of Abyssinia into a conquest of a single mountain fortress defended by only a few thousand warriors in the employ of an unpopular ruler. Additionally, the British secured the support of two Oromo Queens, Werkait and Mostiat, to block all escape routes from Magdala.

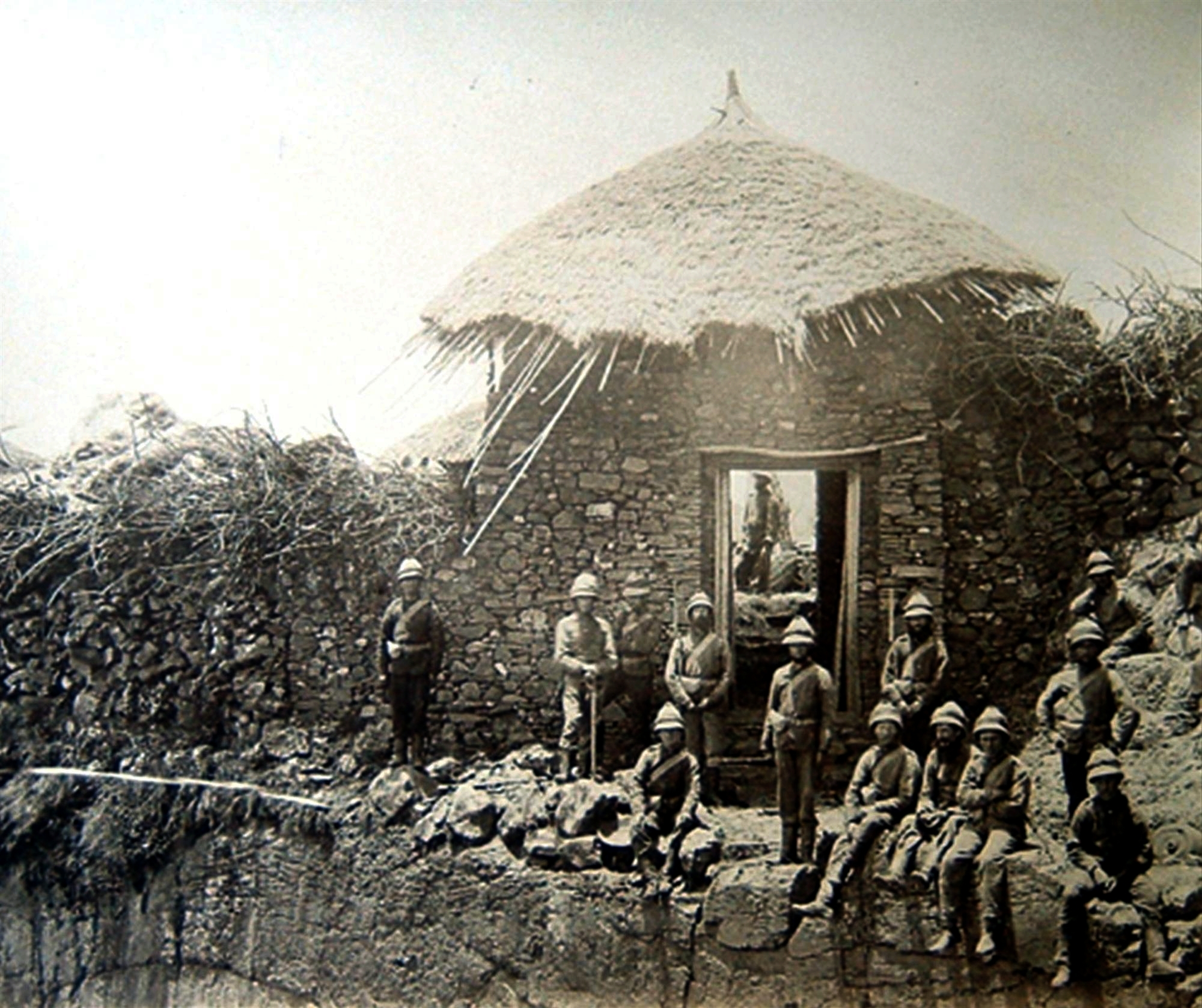
British troops posing at a captured sentry post above Koket-Bir gate at Magdala fortress

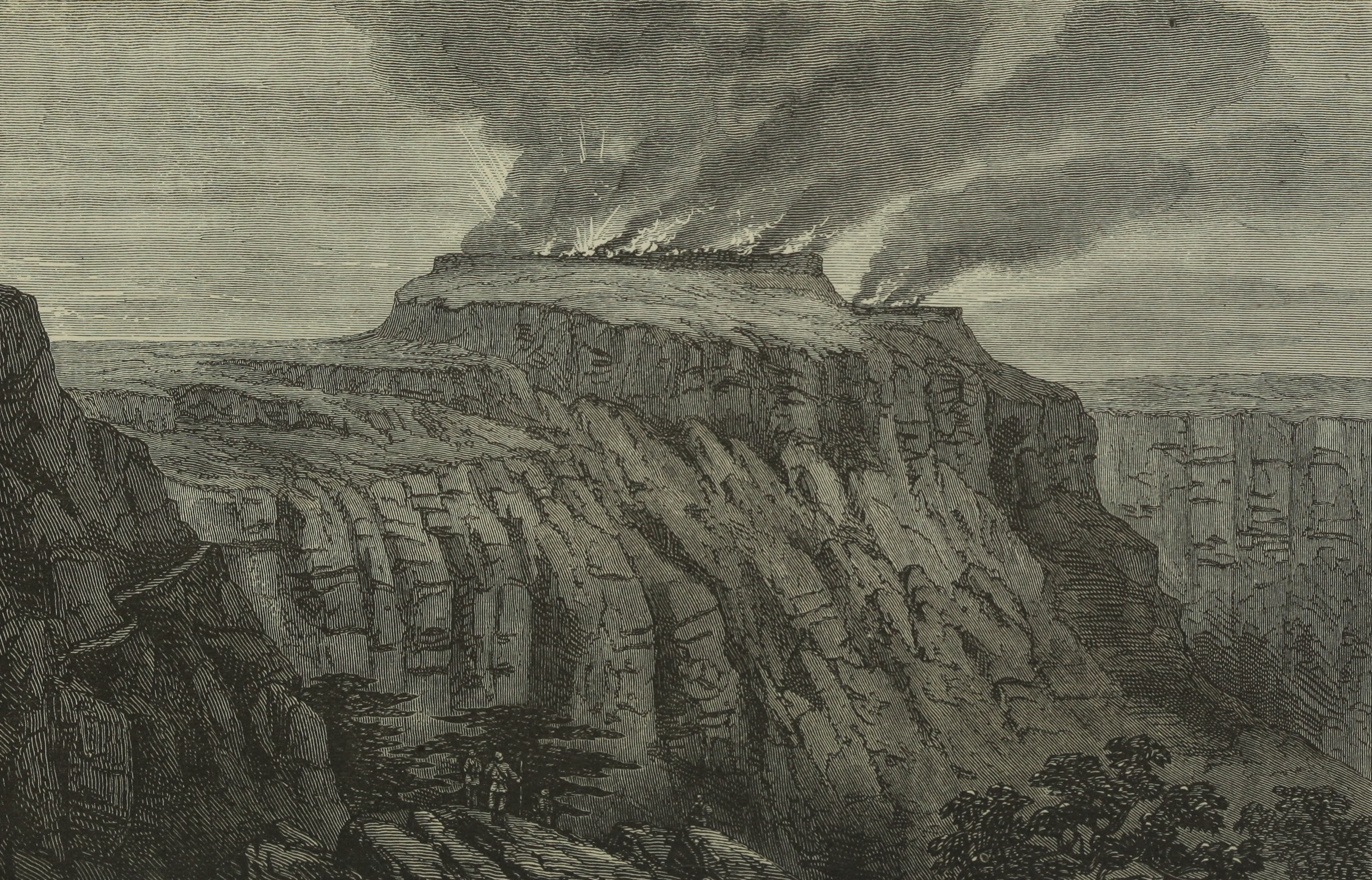
The fortress of Magdala burning

=== Tewodros' movements ===
At the same time the British marched south to Magdala, Tewodros advanced from the west, up the course of the Bashilo River, with the cannons (including his prize creation, the massive Sebastopol) that he had induced the European missionaries and foreign artisans to build for him at Gafat. The Emperor intended to arrive at Magdala before the British, and although he had a shorter distance to cross and had started his journey ten days before Napier left Zula, his success was not certain, and he only arrived at his fortress ten days before his opponents. Rubenson notes that it was Tewodros, not the British expedition, which had to travel through hostile territory, for Tewodros's soldiers had marched under the threat of attacks from Gobeze's numerically superior forces, and had been obliged to defend themselves against hostile enemies on the way to Magdala. Tewodros's problems of provisioning for his army and transporting his artillery had also been much greater than Napier's. Most important of all, Tewodros could not trust even the four thousand soldiers who still followed him. Given the opportunity, they might abandon him as so many had already done.

Tewodros provided one last demonstration of his lack of diplomatic skills on 17 February, when after accepting the submission of the inhabitants of Delanta, he asked them why they had waited until he appeared with his army. When they answered that they had been prevented by rebellious Oromo and Gobeze, "he told them they were as bad as the others, and ordered them to be plundered. ... Consequently, when the King [Tewodros] further ordered them to be attacked, they all fought bravely, and, in conjunction with the inhabitants of Dawunt, killed a great number of his soldiers and seized their arms and mules." Not only had Tewodros isolated himself for several days in a hostile territory within sight of his last stronghold, a deputation from the Yejju, who were coming to him to offer their submission, upon hearing Tewodros's savagery promptly turned around.

=== Arrival of the British ===
On 9 April, the lead elements of the British force reached the Bashilo, "and on the following morning, Good Friday, they crossed the stream barefooted, stopping to fill their water-bottles on the way."

On the afternoon of that Good Friday, the decisive Battle of Magdala began outside the fortress. The British had to get past the plateau at Arogye, which lay across the only open route to Magdala. The way was barred by thousands of armed Ethiopian soldiers camped around the hillsides with up to 30 artillery pieces. The British, not expecting the Ethiopians to leave their defences and attack them, paid little attention to them as they formed up to deploy.

Tewodros, however, ordered an attack, and thousands of soldiers, many of them armed only with spears, charged the British positions. The British quickly deployed to meet the charging mass, and poured devastating fire into their ranks, including rockets from the Naval Brigade and Mountain gun artillery fire, as well as rifle fire. Of the rocket fire, Captain Hozier remarked "Many a charred mass and mangled heap showed how terrible was the havoc, how awful the death". During the fighting, an advance guard unit overpowered some of the Ethiopian artillery crews and captured their artillery pieces. After a chaotic 90-minute battle, the defeated Ethiopians retreated back to Magdala.

Altogether, about 700 to 800 Ethiopian warriors were killed and 1,200 to 1,500 wounded, most of them seriously, while on the British side there were only twenty casualties, two fatally wounded men, nine seriously wounded, and nine lightly wounded. As such, the Arogye battle was far more bloody and consequential than the subsequent day's siege of the hill-top fort at Magdala.

=== Siege of Magdala ===
After repelling the Ethiopian attack, the British force moved onto Magdala the following day. As the British approached, Tewodros released two hostages on parole to offer terms. Napier insisted on release of the hostages and an unconditional surrender. Tewodros refused to unconditionally surrender, but released the European hostages over the next two days, while the native hostages had their hands and feet amputated before being thrown over the edge of the precipice surrounding the plateau.

The British continued their advance on 13 April, and laid siege to the fortress of Magdala. The British attack began with a bombardment with mortars, rockets, and artillery. Infantry units then opened fire to provide cover for the Royal Engineers as they blew up the gates of the fortress at 4pm. British infantry then poured in and opened fire, and advanced with fixed bayonets, forcing the defenders to retreat to the second gate. The British then advanced and took the second gate, where they found Tewodros dead inside. Tewodros had committed suicide with a pistol that had originally been a gift from Queen Victoria, rather than face captivity. When his death was announced, resistance from the defenders ceased. A modern commentator states "When Tewodros preferred self-inflicted death to captivity, he deprived the British of this ultimate satisfaction and laid the foundation for his own resurrection as a symbol of the defiant independence of the Ethiopian."

Lieutenant Stumm, an eyewitness, described the discovery of Tewodros's body:

Climbing a narrow rock stairway, we advanced quickly toward a second gate, through which we passed without meeting resistance. About a hundred paces beyond it lay the half-naked body of the Emperor himself, who had taken his own life with a pistol shot. A strange smile was on the remarkably young and attractive-looking face, and I was struck particularly by the finely drawn, boldly aquiline nose.

— Matthies 2012

Tewodros's body was cremated and his ashes buried inside a local church by the priests. The church itself was guarded by soldiers of the 33rd Regiment, who looted it, taking away a variety of gold, silver, and brass crosses, as well as filigree works and rare tabots.

The casualties in the Battle for Magdala were comparatively small: the British artillery's bombardment killed about twenty Ethiopian warriors and civilians and wounded about 120, whereas a further forty-five Ethiopians were killed by rifle fire during the infantry assault. Altogether, the British troops' casualties included only ten seriously wounded and five lightly wounded. These deaths are noticeably fewer than the previous day's massacre at Arogye which proved to be the decisive engagement of the campaign.

Before the British abandoned Magdala, Sir Robert ordered the destruction of Tewodros's artillery. He also permitted his troops to loot and burn the fortress, including its churches, as a punitive measure. The troops collected many historical and religious artefacts that were taken back to Britain, many of which can now be seen in the British Library and the British Museum. Fifteen elephants and almost 200 mules were required to carry away the booty.

== Aftermath ==
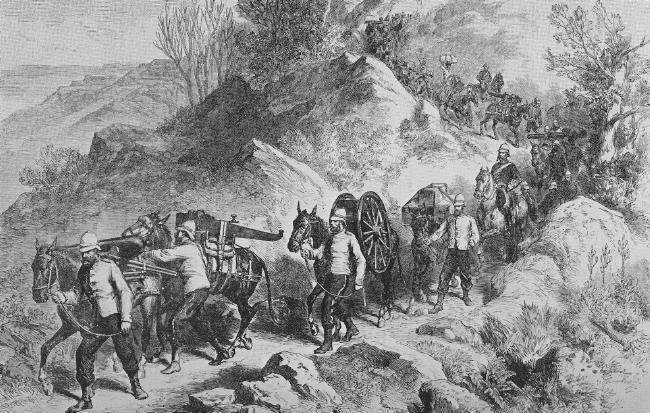
The British troops begin their return march to Zula

Magdala was in the territory of the Muslim Oromo tribes, who had long before taken it from the Amhara people; however Tewodros had won it back from them some years earlier. Two rival Oromo queens, Werkait and Mostiat, had both allied themselves with the British and claimed control of the conquered fortress as a reward. Napier much preferred to hand Magdala over to the Christian ruler of Lasta, Wagshum Gobeze, because if Gobeze were in control of the fortress, he would be able to halt the Oromos' advance and assume responsibility for over 30,000 Christian refugees from Tewodros's camp. Yet as Gobeze was unresponsive to these overtures, much preferring to acquire Tewodros's cannons, and the two Oromo queens could not reach an arrangement, Napier decided to destroy the fortress.

Following the destruction of Magdala, the British began to retrace their steps back to Zula, "an imposing procession, with the bands playing and the flags leading the way, but the army soon learned that they had earned no gratitude in Ethiopia; they were treated as simply another warlike tribe on the move, and now that they were going away like weak and defeated men they were an obvious target for attack." At Senafe, the British rewarded Ras Kassai, Yohannes IV, for his services with a formidable quantity of supplies, which Marcus estimates were worth "approximately £500,000": six mortars, six howitzers, about 900 muskets and rifles, stocks of ammunition which included 585,480 percussion caps, and other goods and supplies. These later aided his rise to Emperor against such talented rivals as Wagshum Gobeze and Menelik of Shewa.

At Zula, Napier assigned Captain Charles Goodfellow, on behalf of the British Museum, to carry out an excavation in nearby Adulis, the harbour of the ancient Kingdom of Aksum. Several artifacts were uncovered including pottery, coins and stone columns. This marked the first archaeological excavation of the ancient city of Adulis, a key African port of antiquity which served as a hub for trade along the Red Sea.

By 2 June, the base camp was dismantled and as the men and hostages were loaded into the ships, Napier boarded the Feroze on 10 June, and set sail for England by way of the Suez Canal.

On a curious side note, many of the hostages were unhappy with Napier's demand that they leave the country. Several hostages argued that they had long since become alienated from their old homeland in Europe and would no longer have any chance of building a new life for their families there. The German observer Josef Bechtinger, who accompanied the expedition, wrote:

Most of them, instead of thanking Providence for their final rescue – were not all happy with the new turn of events. They were indignant, upset, at having to leave Abyssinia. "What" they said, "are we supposed to do in Europe now, what are we supposed to do now with our wives and children back in our homeland – which has become alien to us? How are we supposed to live now among people who have [become] alien to us and whom we no longer like? What are we supposed to live on?

Bechtinger reported that many of them eventually returned to their adopted country from Suez by way of Massawa.

In London, Napier was made Baron Napier of Magdala in recognition of his achievement. General Napier was also made Knight Grand Cross of the Order of the Bath (GCB) on 27 April 1868. At Gibraltar, where he served as governor from 1876 to 1883, there is a battery named in his honour, Napier of Magdala Battery.

One soldier from the Expedition, John Kirkham, stayed in Ethiopia and ultimately served as an advisor to Yohannes IV. Kirkham was instrumental in training Ethiopian troops to Western military standards, raising and drilling what became known as the Emperor's Disciplined Force. Kirkham's troops played a major role in the defeat of Yohannes's rival for the Ethiopian crown, Wagshum Gobeze, fighting with conspicuous success in the Battle of Assam on 11 July 1871. Kirkham had sacrificed his status as a British subject by agreeing to serve under Yohannes, something which came back to haunt him when he was imprisoned in Massawa by Egyptian forces during the Egyptian-Ethiopian War. Despite being discovered by a group of British sailors from HMS Teazer, the sailors were not permitted to help him escape. Kirkham died in captivity in 1876.

=== Ethiopian politics ===
Prince Alemayehu, son of Tewodros and Empress Tiruwork Wube, was kidnapped and taken to London where he was presented to Queen Victoria, who took a liking to the young boy. Alemayehu later studied at Cheltenham College, the Rugby School and the Royal Military Academy Sandhurst. However, both the Queen and Napier were later concerned with the subsequent development of the young prince who became increasingly lonely, unhappy and depressed during this time. In 1879, the prince died of illness at the age of 19. He was buried near the royal chapel in Windsor with a funeral plaque placed to his memory by Queen Victoria.

After the withdrawal of the British, fighting for the succession to Tewodros's throne raged in Ethiopia from 1868 to 1872. Eventually, it was Dajamach Kassai of Tigray, not least because of the British weapons given to him by the withdrawing Magdala expedition, who was able to expand his power and prevail over his rivals. In July 1871, he won the Battle of Assam, near Adwa, even though he had far fewer troops defeated his old rival Wagshum Gobeze of Lasta. Kassai had himself crowned Emperor of Ethiopia, taking the name Yohannes IV.

=== Battle honour ===
The success of the expedition led to the institution of a battle honour, Abyssinia, which was awarded to units of the British Indian Army that had participated in the campaign. The units that participated from the campaign belonged, with the exception of the Madras Sappers, to the Bengal and Bombay Presidency armies.

=== Casualties ===
Casualty figures for the campaign indicate a significant disparity between the losses of British and Indian forces and those of the Ethiopian forces. In total, British and Indian troops suffered 33 British and 512 Indian soldiers killed, with approximately 700 wounded over the course of the campaign. These relatively low losses have often been attributed to superior logistics, discipline, and the technological advantages of the expeditionary force. In contrast, Ethiopian casualties for the campaign as a whole are not definitively known, as comprehensive records were not maintained or have not survived.

More specific figures are available for individual engagements, particularly the Battle of Arogee. In this encounter, Ethiopian forces are reported to have suffered approximately 700 killed and 1,200 wounded. British losses in the same battle were minimal by comparison, with only 2 soldiers killed and a small number wounded. The engagement demonstrated the effectiveness of British firepower against larger Ethiopian formations and set the stage for the subsequent advance on Magdala.

== Scientific exploration ==
The expedition was accompanied by a team of selected scientists who each undertook research or collections while accompanying the expedition. This team included William Thomas Blanford, a geologist and naturalist, William Jesse, a zoologist, and Dr Henry Cook, a physician and meteorologist. This resulted in the publication of the book Observations on the geology and zoology of Abyssinia, made during the progress of the British expedition to that country in 1867–68.

== Looted objects ==
The British Museum sent a member of staff, Richard Rivington Holmes, as part of the expedition. After the Magdala expeditions ended, many looted objects, cultural artefacts and art objects found their way into state and private collections, family possessions, and the hands of ordinary soldiers. Most of the books and manuscripts went to the British Museum or the Bodleian Library in Oxford, while a few went to the Royal Library in Windsor Castle and to smaller British collections. Other looted objects ended up in the Victoria and Albert Museum, the Museum of Mankind and the National Army Museum. The National Army Museum agreed to return a lock of Tewodros' hair in 2019 which was taken during the expedition. All the scientific acquisitions and expropriated articles of the Magdala expedition stimulated and promoted an increased interest in the history and culture of Ethiopia among European researchers and the educated public. This laid the foundations for modern Ethiopian Studies, and also for the research on the ancient Kingdom of Aksum.

From time to time some of the looted treasure has been returned to Ethiopia. For instance, an edition of the Kebra Nagast along with an icon of a picture of Christ wearing the crown of thorns were returned to Emperor Yohannes IV in the 1870s. In 1902, Lady Valerie Meux bequeathed her collection of Ethiopian manuscripts to Emperor Menelik II, but her will was overturned shortly after her death in 1910.

In 1924, the Empress Zawditu was given one of the two looted crowns of Tewodros, but the more valuable gold crown was retained by the Victoria and Albert Museum. In the 1960s, Queen Elizabeth II returned Tewodros's royal cap and seal to Emperor Haile Selassie while on a state visit to Ethiopia.

In 1999, several prominent figures in Britain and Ethiopia created the Association For the Return of the Magdala Ethiopian Treasures (AFROMET) which has pursued an information and lobbying campaign to see all treasures taken during the expedition repatriated back to Ethiopia.

== In popular culture ==
The Abyssinia Expedition is the setting for the George MacDonald Fraser novel Flashman on the March.
