= Black Assarca shipwreck =

Shipwreck

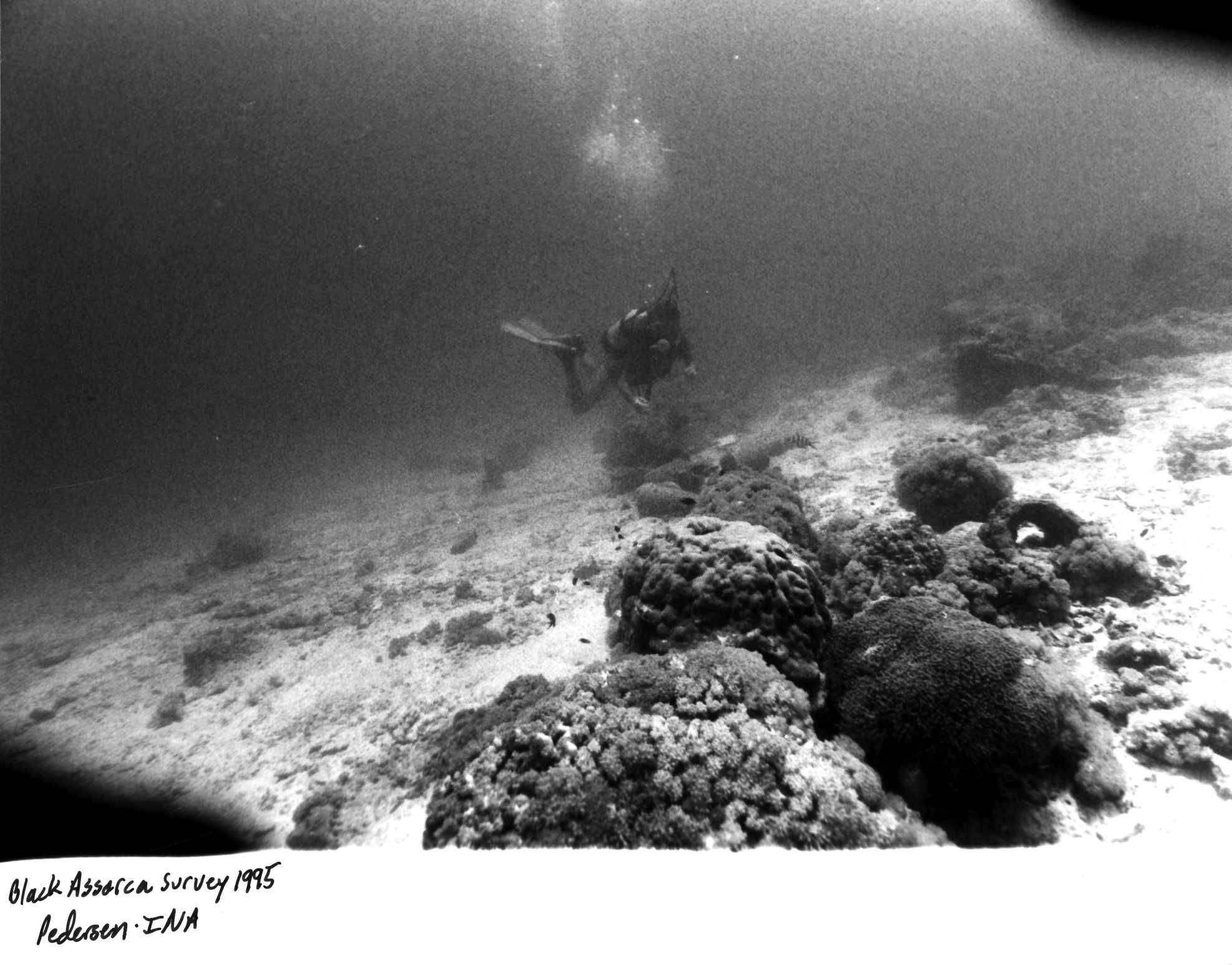
Examining the shipwreck site in 1995

The Black Assarca shipwreck was first discovered by tourists in 1995, at Black Assarca Island, Eritrea. The wreck was surveyed in 1995 and partially excavated in 1997 by the Institute of Nautical Archaeology, under the auspices of the Ministry of Marine Resources of Eritrea.

The 1997 excavation team, headed by Ralph K. Pedersen, discovered various artifacts of Near Eastern/Mediterranean origin, including amphoras of a type known as "Ayla-Axum Amphoras", or more accurately "Aqaba Amphoras" after their point of manufacture. These long and conical "carrot shaped" amphoras, decorated with corrugations, or rilling, have been found previously at such sites as: Aksum, the capital of the Aksumite Kingdom; Metara; Adulis, the Aksumite port city located on the west side of Zula Bay; Berenike, the Ptolemaic harbor in Egypt; and Aqaba, Jordan. Based on the finds at these sites, the Black Assarca ceramics are thought to date from around the 5th or 6th century, with the wreck possibly dating from the early 7th century.

Although all but one of the Aqaba amphoras excavated were broken, they formed a cohesive body of material. Some amphoras were simply missing handles. Others had necks broken off as well, while many had broken bodies. Several of the Aqaba amphoras were cleanly broken at the joint where the upper body segment joined the bottom segment. The juncture, a naturally weak spot in the vessels, was obvious on all the narrow conical amphoras. Unlike the evenly spaced rilling elsewhere on the amphora bodies the rilling added to the joint was irregular and generally coarse in its execution. Rilling was present on all the amphoras and sherds excavated, spaced approximately 1.2 cm apart, and apparently done on the potter’s wheel. Rilling started immediately above the toe button, and from there it crafted as a continuous spiral to the neck, interrupted only at the joint. Rilling was peculiar to the eastern Mediterranean in the first millennium AD and has been found on several ceramic forms in a number of sites (Pedersen 2008: 82).

The interior faces of many sherds and amphora bodies were coated with a blackish substance, reminiscent of Mediterranean wine amphoras that were sealed with a resin to prevent the liquids inside from leaching through the ceramic. One sherd, comprising approximately the lower 15 cm of an amphora, was split vertically down through the toe button. The piece was filled with a solid mass of resin, probably excess that collected in the bottom when the interior of the vessel was being sealed, or perhaps being the transport item itself. This revealed that the toe button was hollow. Buttons generally receive the brunt of damage in shipping amphorae as they rest on dunnage, other cargoes, hulls, and docksides. None of the buttons examined showed wear beyond what one would expect for new vessels being transported from potter’s shop to dock to ship. Perhaps this indicates that the amphoras were new and not reused (Pedersen, 2008: 83).

Other finds include a counterbalance weight for a steelyard, a piece of glass, and two other amphora types: one a round, or globular amphora known as a costrel, and the other a wider version of the conical type. Both of these amphora types share stylistic characteristics with the Aqaba vessels demonstrating a common cultural venue and origin point. No ship's hull remains were found in the 1997 excavation season.
