= Ayla-Axum amphorae =

Narrow conical amphorae found in Eritrea

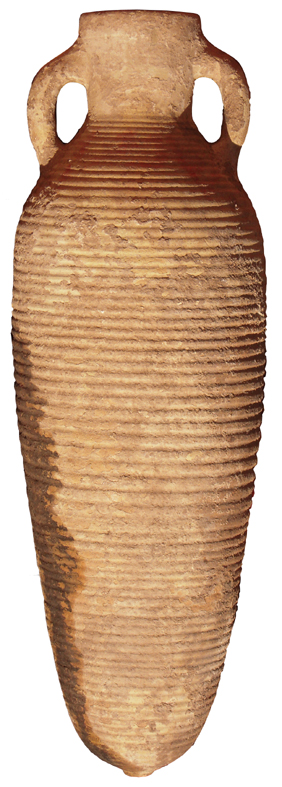
Aqaba-Amphora aus Zafar, Jemen

The Ayla-Axum amphorae are conical, carrot-shaped amphorae found around the Red Sea, particularly in the Late Roman/Byzantine period. Originally named after the widest range of finds in the Red Sea, subsequent findings since the mid-1990s indicate that the amphorae originate in Byzantine, or even early Islamic, Aqaba. Hence, the preferred nomenclature is now "Aqaba Amphora." The Aqaba amphora type has been found in many terrestrial sites throughout the region and beyond, such as in Eritrea and Ethiopia: Aksum, where amphora sherds with fabrics light red on the inside, pale gray on the outside, as well as greenish-gray fabric were found by the Deutsche Aksum Expedition (Zahn 1913: 208); Matara dating to the 4th through 7th centuries (Anfray 1990: 118); and Adulis (Paribeni 1907: 551) examples of which are on display in the National Museum in Asmara. Other examples have been found at Berenike in Egypt, where the amphorae date to a circa AD 400 context in what may be the best-stratified examples (Hayes 1996: 159–61); from Aqaba in Jordan where many examples have been found, including their kilns; on The Shipwreck at Black Assarca Island, Eritrea (Pedersen 2008; Pedersen 2000); and in the Mediterranean on the late 6th-century shipwreck at Iskandil Burnu, Turkey that is the sole example yet found in that sea. A number of the amphoras and sherds came to light during excavations at Zafar in Yemen, and eleven of the sherds were subjected to mineralogical analysis, which demonstrated that the amphoras originate in what is now Aqaba, Jordan.

In 2013, an archaeological expedition from Philipps University Marburg discovered a shipwreck containing Aqaba amphoras near Jeddah.

== See also ==
- Zafar, Yemen
