= Ralph K. Pedersen =

American nautical archaeologist

- Born: Levittown (Island Trees), New York, United States
- Occupation: Nautical archaeologist
- Employer(s): University of San Diego, American University of Beirut, Southwestern Assemblies of God University
- Known for: Nautical archaeology

Ralph K. Pedersen is a nautical archaeologist from Levittown (Island Trees) New York, United States. He was the DAAD Gastdozent für Nautische Archäologie at Philipps-Universität Marburg 2010–2013, and has been the "Distinguished Visiting Professor in Anthropology" and Knapp Chair in Liberal Arts at the University of San Diego, and the Whittlesey Chair Visiting assistant professor in the department of history and archaeology at the American University of Beirut. He has been teaching online courses in archaeology in the History Department at Nelson University (formerly Southwestern Assemblies of God University) since 2009.

== Research ==
Pedersen holds a doctorate from the Nautical Archaeology Program at Texas A&M University. His dissertation entitled "The Boatbuilding Sequence in the Gilgamesh Epic and the Sewn Boat Relation" examines and reinterprets the construction of the Ark of the Deluge in light of archaeological and ethnographic evidence in Arabia, Africa, and India. The focus of this work is that the ark depicted in the epic was of sewn construction, a determination that pushes back the technology to the 13th century B.C. A popular article on this was the cover feature for Biblical Archaeology Review in 2005.

Pedersen has been the principal investigator for nautical archaeology projects in Lebanon and Saudi Arabia. He has been a team member of the excavation of the Bronze Age shipwreck at Uluburun, Turkey; served as daily field director for the 1991 excavation of a 17th-century wreck at Monte Cristi, Dominican Republic under USD Anthropology Associate Professor Jerome Lynn Hall; surveyed underwater in Bahrain in 1993; excavated a 1500-year-old shipwreck at Black Assarca Island, Eritrea; surveyed shipwrecks off New York's Long Island, and served as an associate director of India's Kadakkarapally Boat Project, which involved a thousand-year-old ship found under a coconut grove in Kerala. In 2004, he conducted an underwater survey at Tell el-Burak in Lebanon, and in 2007 in the waters off the early Bronze Age tell at Fadous-Kfarabida for the American University of Beirut. Pedersen has been a research associate with the Institute of Nautical Archaeology, based at Texas A&M University, since 1992.

In 2012, Pedersen, along with colleagues from Philipps-Universität Marburg in Germany, began a multi-year archaeological survey Saudi Arabia’s Red Sea coast to locate and document shipwrecks and ancient harbors. Also in the same year, he conducted a re-assessment of the archaeological site in Beirut, Lebanon known as the "Venus Towers Site," which was claimed by a local activist group to be a Phoenician port. Pedersen's study refuted that determination as no evidence was found to support the maritime interpretation of the site, and that specific features within the site demonstrated the impossibility of the use of the place for ships. In 2013, Pedersen conducted, along with his Lebanese colleague Lucy Semaan, an underwater excavation of an anchorage site in the sea off Beirut that yielded Late Roman pottery, some Iron Age ceramics, and a Phoenician-era stone anchor.

In 2014, Pedersen founded The Red Sea Institute for Anthropological Research, the purpose of which is to promote the scientific inquiry of the Red Sea and surrounding areas—focusing on the subjects of anthropology, archaeology, ethnography, and history—to further our knowledge of the zone and its peoples, to bring into better understanding the intercourse between Africa and Southwestern Asia from the earliest times into the present, and to provide opportunities for research. The institute's intent is to create a better understanding of the dynamics of intercultural maritime connections and exchange, the involved shipbuilding and engineering technologies, maritime exploitation strategies of coastal peoples and their environmental adaptability to arid coastal zones, as well as maritime migration from the prehistoric period into the modern era.

In 2023, Pedersen was the field director for underwater cultural heritage for the company Paleowest, contracted to the Saudi Arabian mega-project NEOM. This survey in the northern area of the Red Sea in Saudi Arabia resulted in the discovery of over a dozen sites containing Byzantine-era ceramics of the Aqaba amphora and costrel types, similar to one found at Black Assarca, Jeddah, Berenike in Egypt, and Aqaba among other locations around the sea. A few Ottoman-period sites were also found.

In addition to his doctorate, Pedersen holds a BA in Anthropology and Linguistics from the State University of New York at Stony Brook, and an MA in Anthropology/Nautical Archaeology from Texas A&M University. He is also a fellow of The Explorers Club.
