= Nolan amphora =

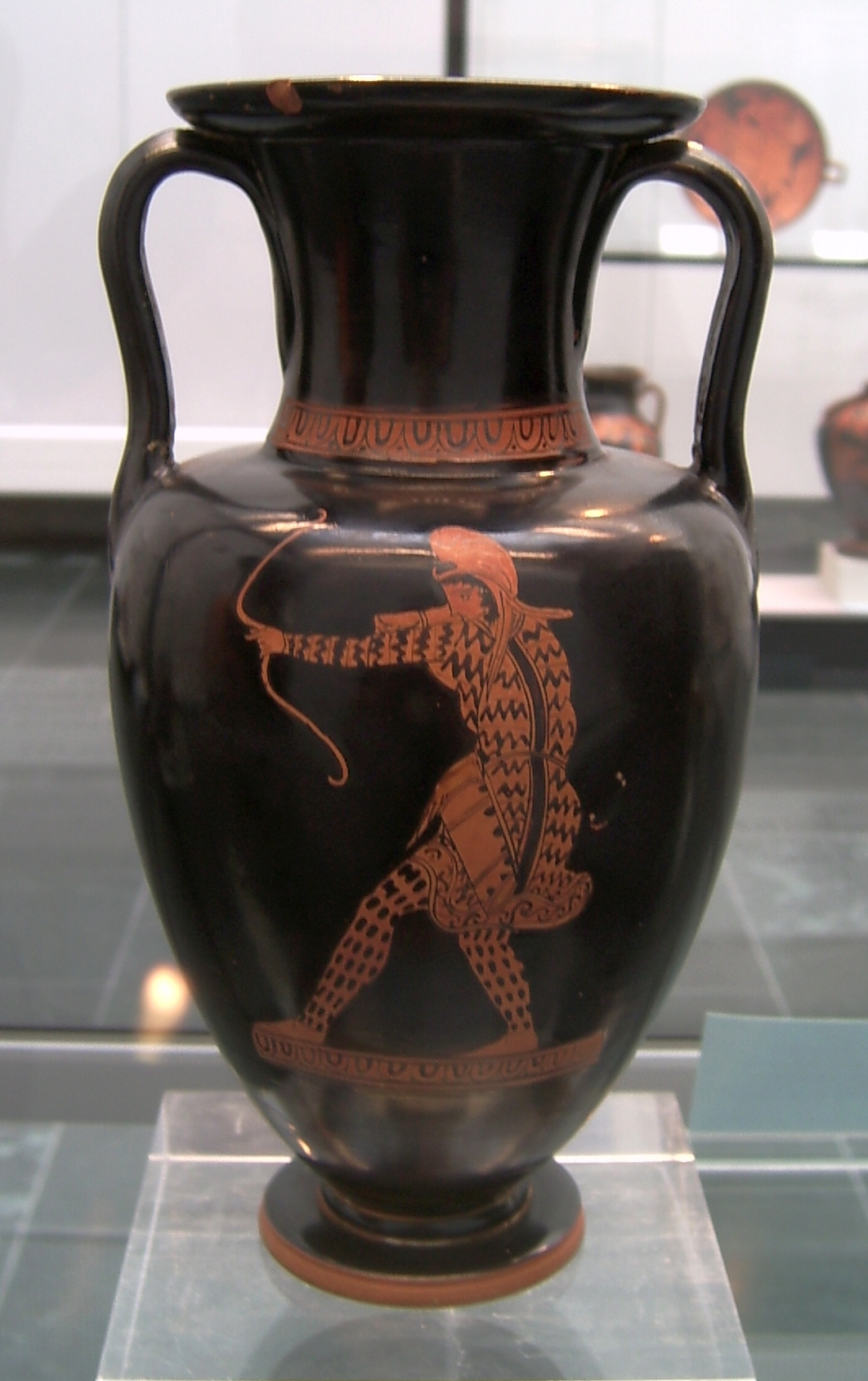
A red-figure Nolan amphora.

The Nolan amphora is a variant style of the amphora jar, a common artifact of Greek and Roman pottery. Nolan amphorae are characterized by a neck that is longer and narrower than in traditional neck amphorae, along with ribbed handles or straps that join the piece at the base of the neck. They are named for the archaeological site at Nola, Italy, where an abundance of these vessels have been unearthed.

== Historical origins ==
The distinct shape and style of the Nolan amphora is thought to have emerged from two styles of older Attic black-figure pottery: the black-figure panel amphora and the red-bodied amphora. It has been theorized that the former is the closest predecessor of the Nolan shape, given that it has both the elongated neck of the red-bodied amphora and the smaller size associated with Nolan amphorae. Nolan vessels, however, do not always have decorated palmettes characteristic of black-figure panel amphorae.

Both black-figure and red-figure neck amphorae were first created in Athens, with roots in Protoattic vases. Nolan amphorae feature almost exclusively red-figure ornamentation. The style would have been disseminated throughout Greece, Italy, and later the Roman Empire via trade with Greek, particularly Athenian, artisans. Early examples of such vases were known to have been created for trade in Etruscan markets.

== Gallery ==
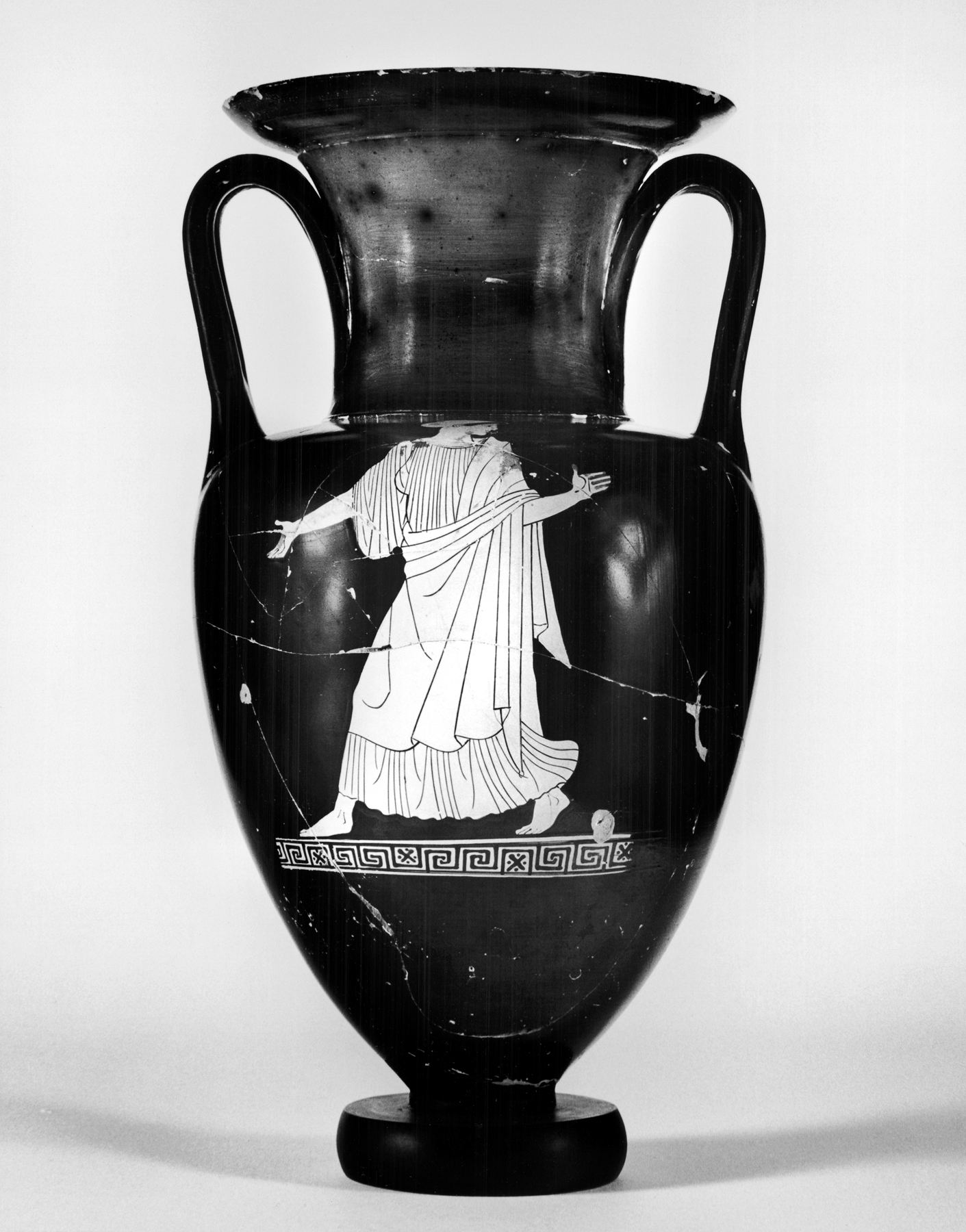

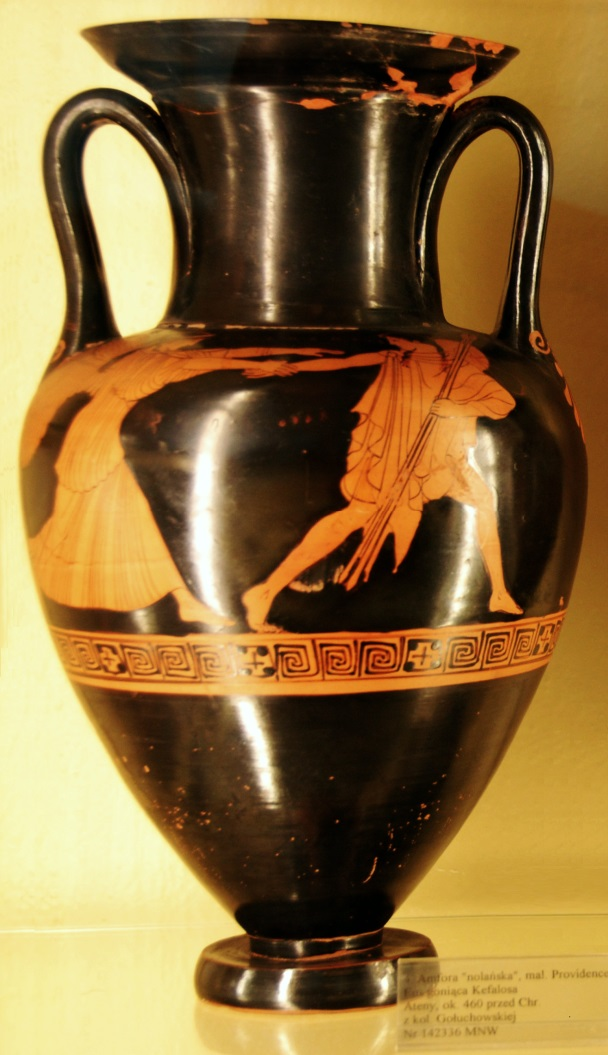

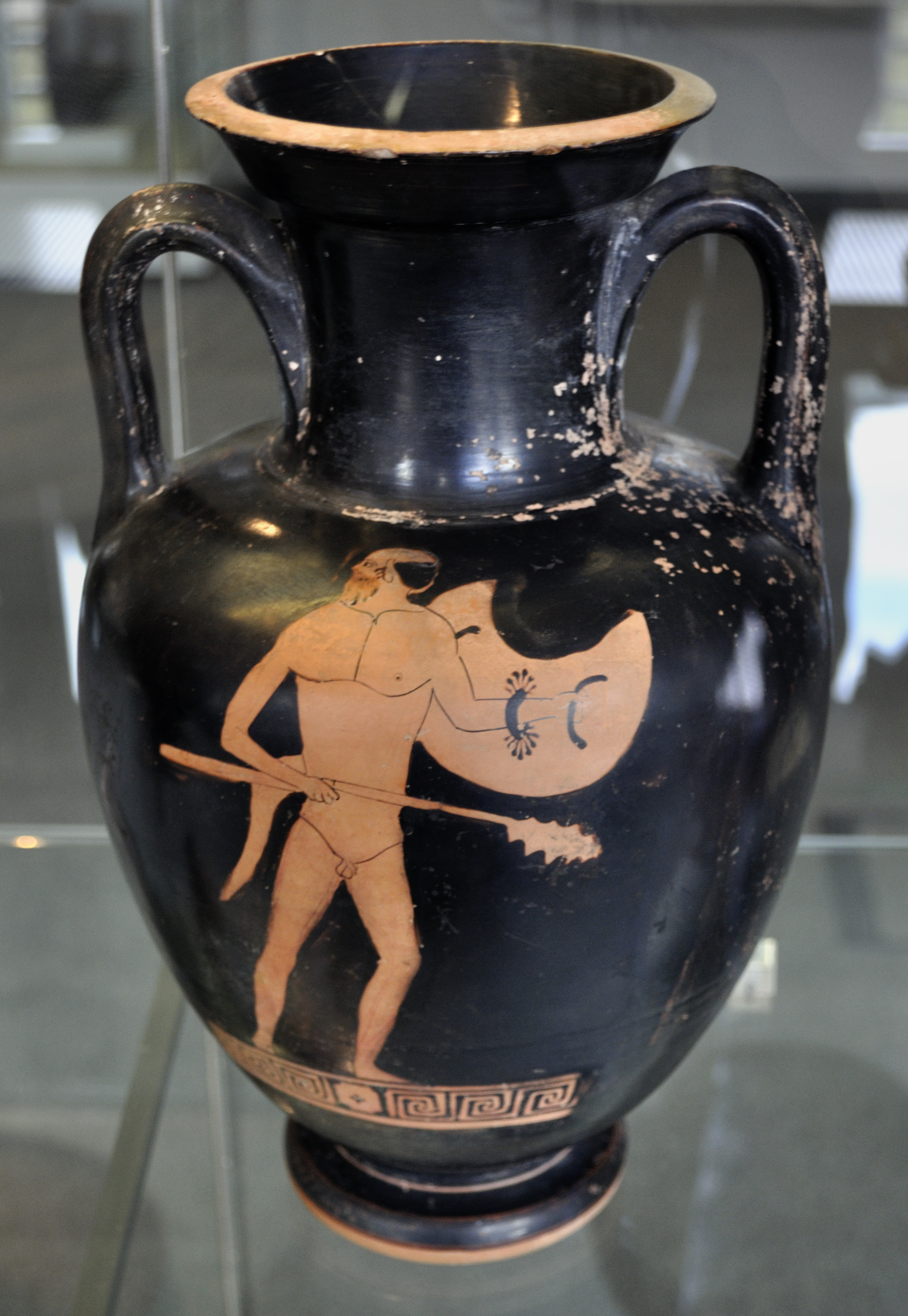

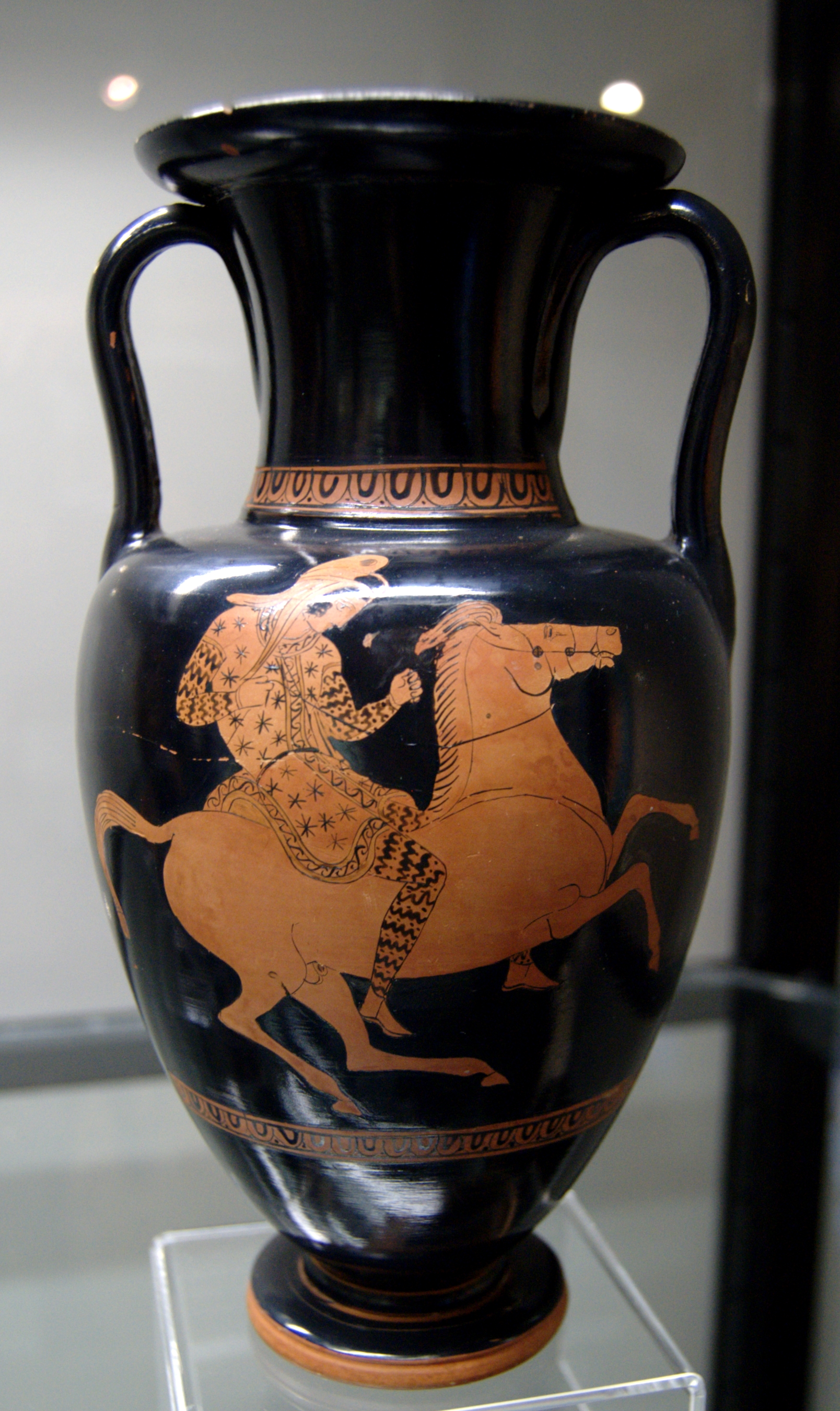

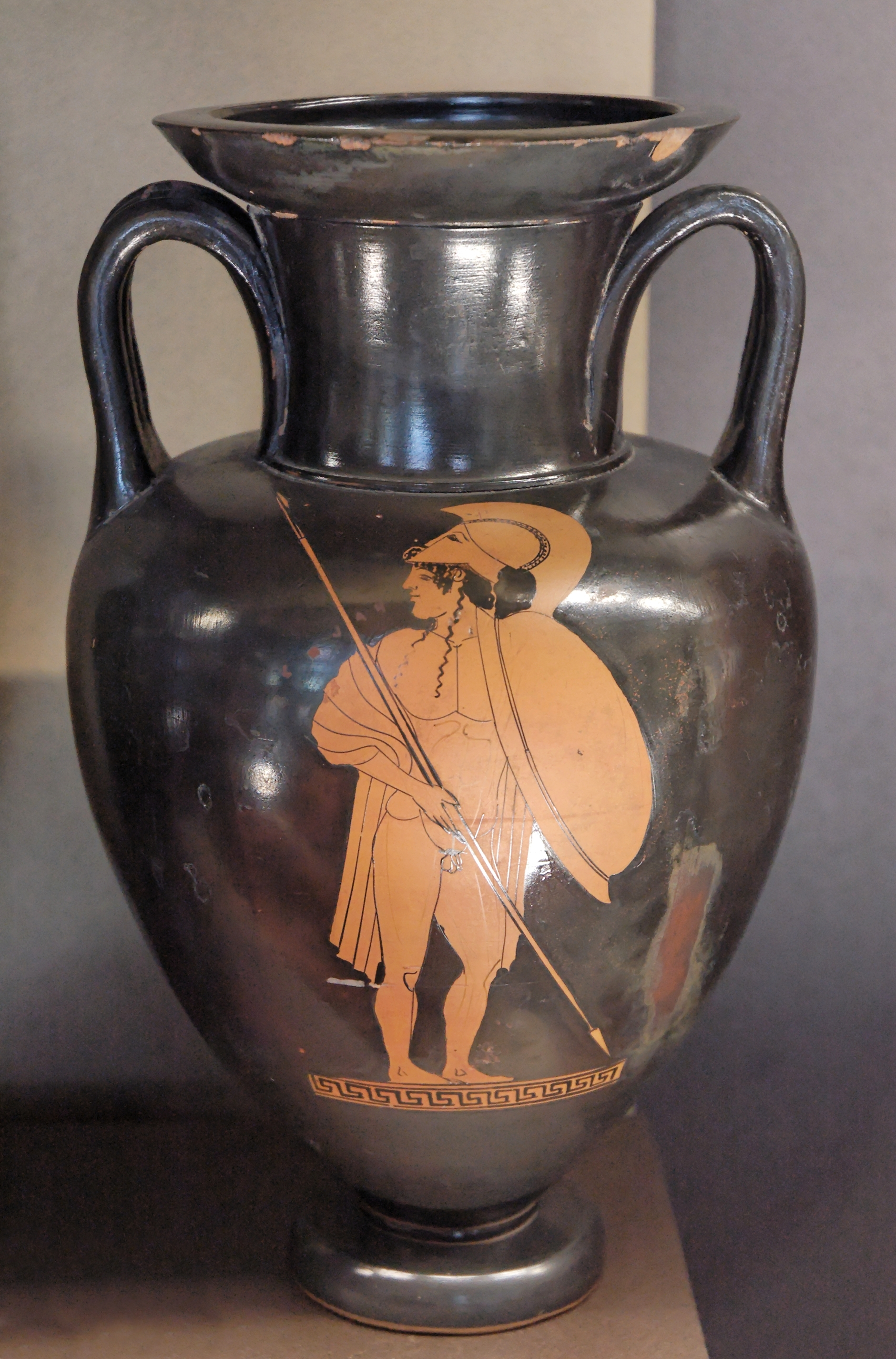

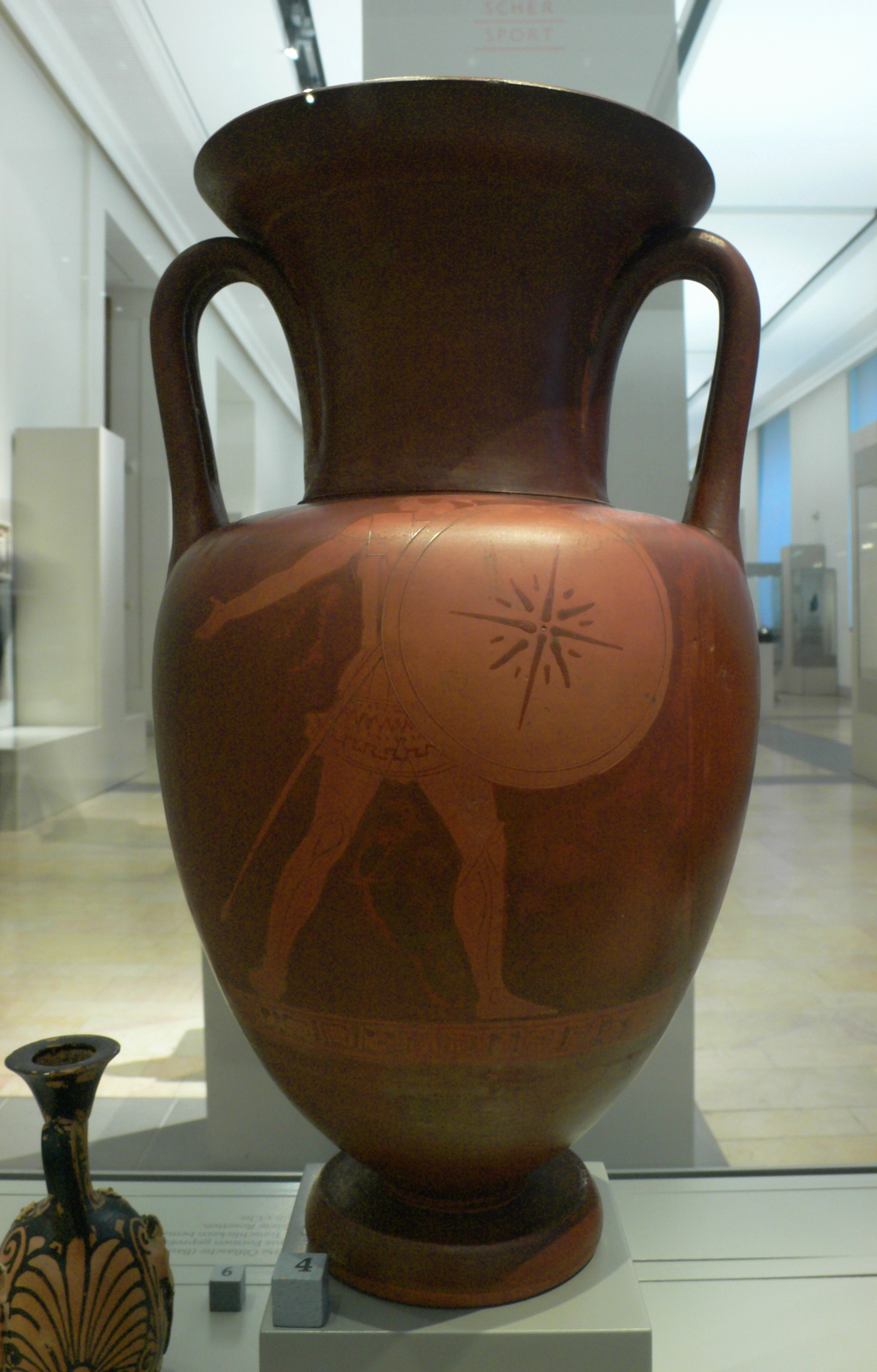
