= Steelyard balance =

Type of weight scale

A steelyard balance, steelyard, or stilyard is a straight-beam balance with arms of unequal length. It incorporates a counterweight which slides along the longer arm to counterbalance the load and indicate its weight. A steelyard is also known as a Roman steelyard or Roman balance.

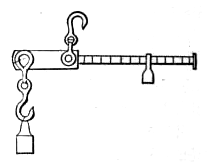
A 19th-century steelyard crane

== Structure ==
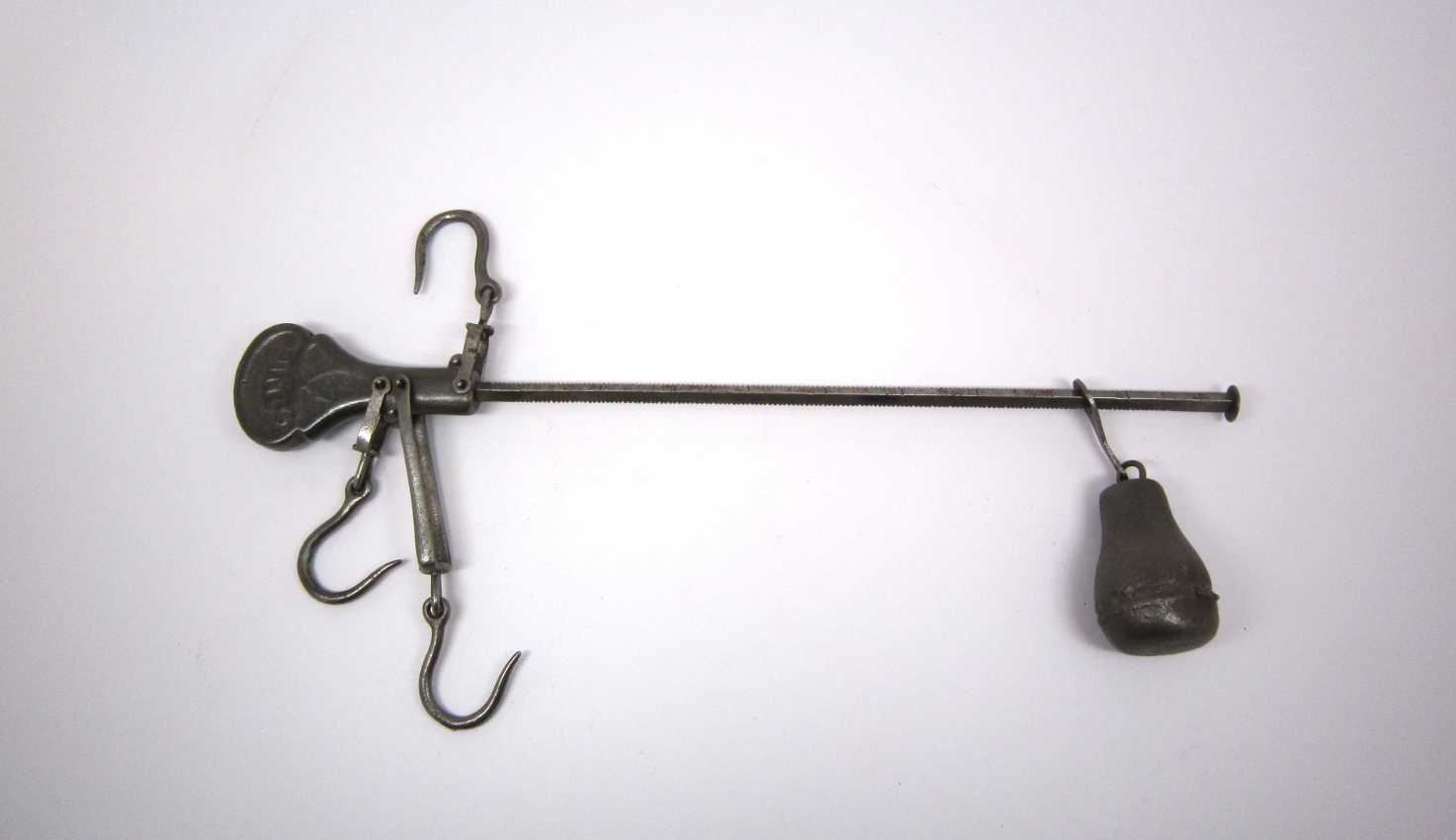
Steelyard weighing device from the late nineteenth century. Minnesota Historical Society collections.

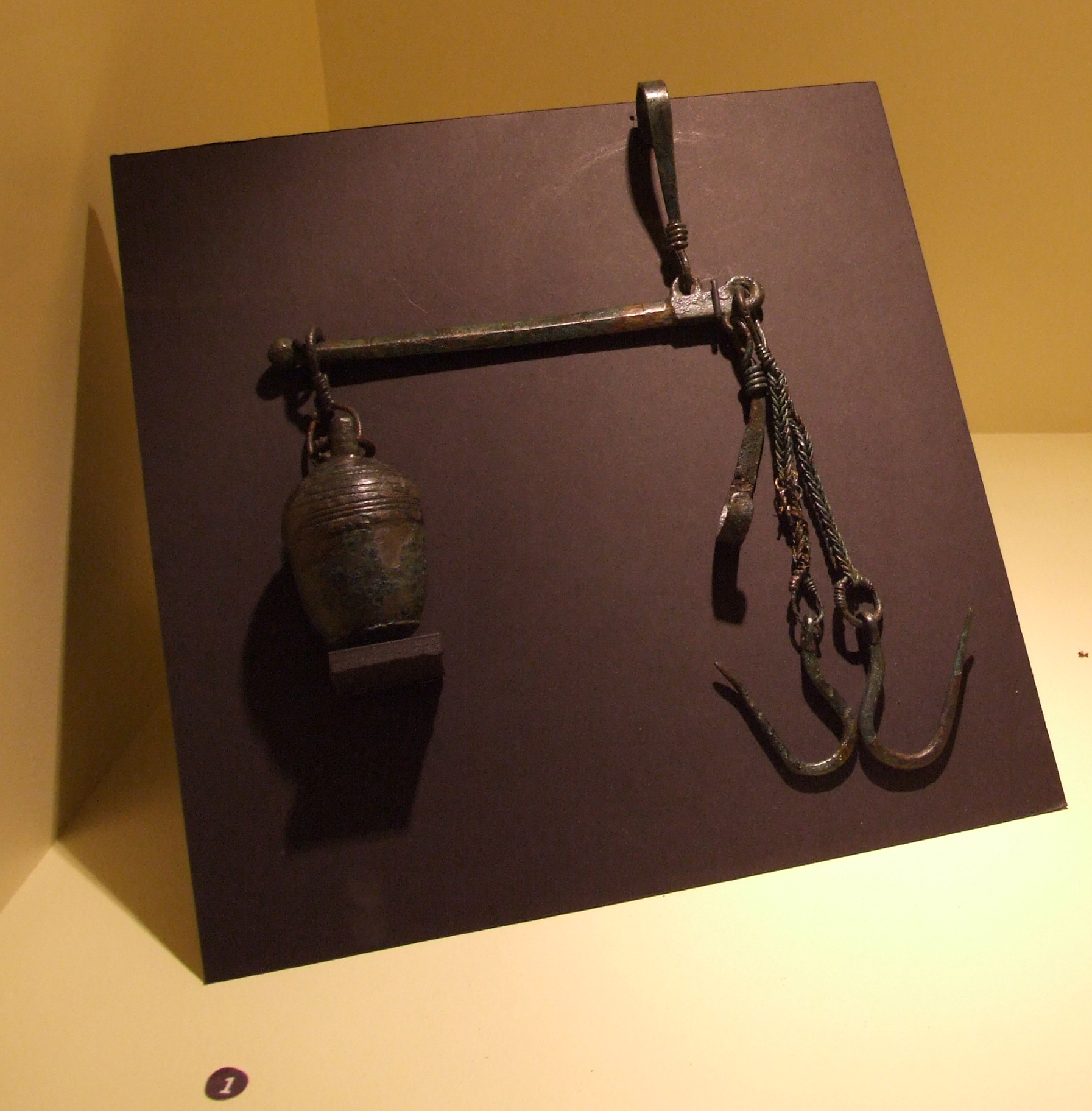
Roman steelyard from Pompeii

The steelyard comprises a balance beam which is suspended from a lever/pivot or fulcrum which is very close to one end of the beam. The two parts of the beam which flank the pivot are the arms. The arm from which the object to be weighed (the load) is hung is short and is located close to the pivot point. The other arm is longer, is graduated and incorporates a counterweight which can be moved along the arm until the two arms are balanced about the pivot, at which time the weight of the load is indicated by the position of the counterweight.

== Mechanism ==
The steelyard exemplifies the law of the lever, wherein, when balanced, the net moment around the pivot must be zero. Since $M=Fd$, the weight of the object being weighed multiplied by the length of the short balance arm to which it is attached is equal to the weight of the counterweight multiplied by the distance of the counterweight from the pivot.

== History ==
According to Thomas G. Chondros of Patras University, a simple steelyard balance with a lever mechanism first appeared in the ancient Near East over 5,000 years ago. According to Mark Sky of Harvard University, the steelyard was in use among Greek craftsmen of the 5th and 4th centuries BC, even before Archimedes demonstrated the law of the lever theoretically. The Latin name statera comes from the Ancient Greek στατήρ (statḗr). Roman and Chinese steelyards were independently invented around 200 BC. Steelyards dating from AD 100 to 400 have been unearthed in Great Britain. Steelyards and their components have also been excavated from shipwrecks of the Byzantine period in the Mediterranean and the Red Sea, such as the 7th-century wreck at Yassi Ada, Turkey, and the mid-first millennium shipwreck at Black Assarca Island, Eritrea. The Oxford English Dictionary suggests that the name "steelyard" is derived from steel combined with yard, influenced by an allusion to the Steelyard, the main trading base of the Hanseatic League in London in the 14th century.

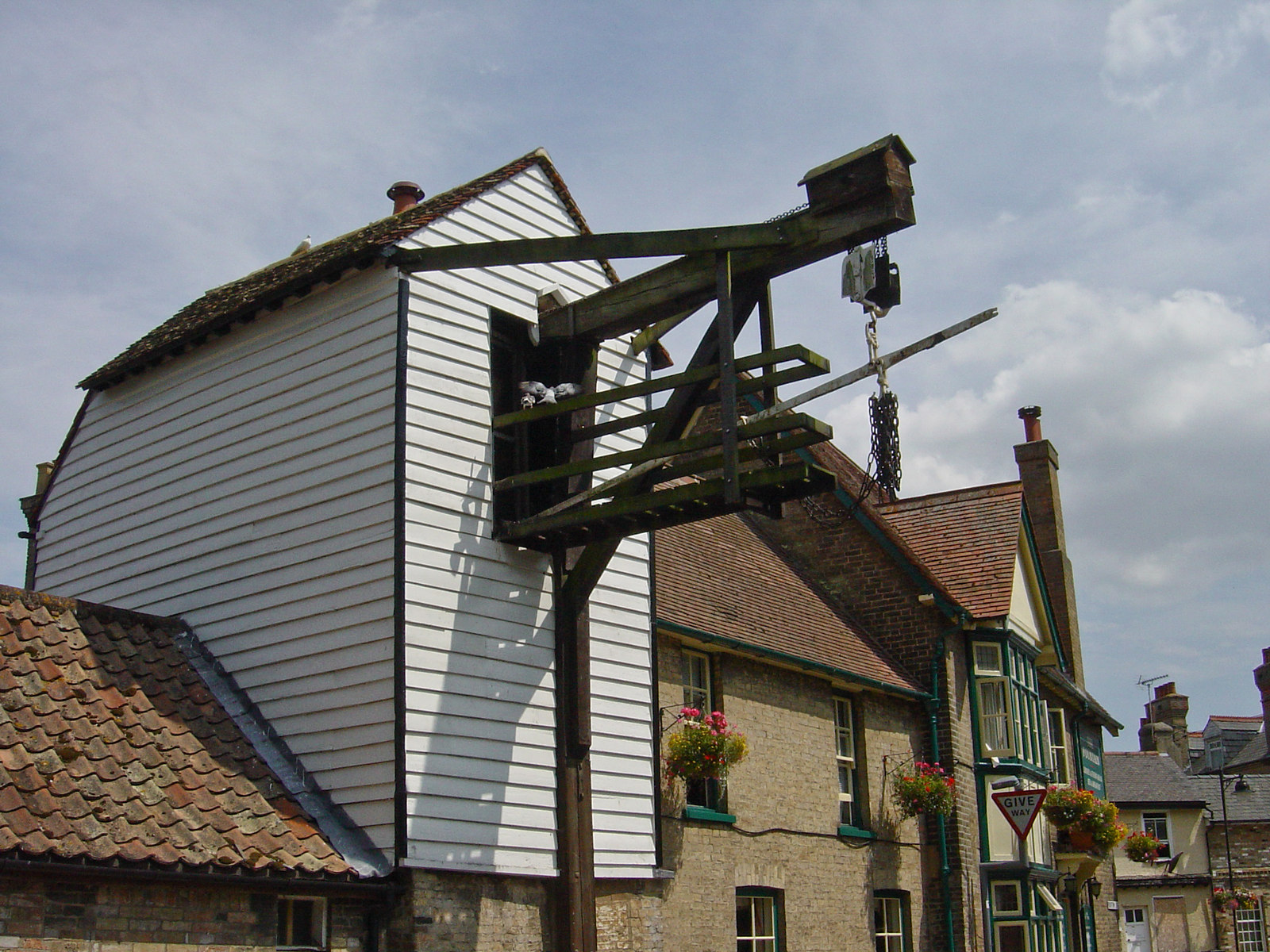
Eighteenth century cart balance at Fountains Lane, Soham

Large steelyard balances (known as cart steelyards), both public and private, were a common feature in agricultural areas in England from the eighteenth century forward. An example of a public cart steelyard remains at Soham, Cambridgeshire, and another is at Woodbridge, Suffolk.

== Function ==
Steelyards of different sizes have been used to weigh loads ranging from ounces to tons. A small steelyard could be a foot or less in length and thus conveniently used as a portable device that merchants and traders could use to weigh small ounce-sized items of merchandise. Small steelyard-type rocker balances were also made to weigh and gauge coins. An English example made around 1840, Simmons's Improved Sovereign Balance, was designed for sovereigns and half-sovereigns and checked both their diameter and thickness. In other cases a steelyard could be several feet long and used to weigh sacks of flour and other commodities. Even larger steelyards were three stories tall and used to weigh fully laden horse-drawn waggons.

== Electromagnetic steelyard balance ==
A steelyard could be used to measure electric current. in 1856 Wildman Whitehouse announced his method of using magnetic coils, representing the load be measured, at one end of a steelyard balance. The position of the moving weight on the balance was adjusted in the usual way to counter the pull of the coils. Whitehouse claimed that his invention gave a steadier reading of current passing through telegraph cables under test than the galvanometers then commonly used.

== Horizontal variants ==
Waybill for consignment of limestone, weighed on a wagon steelyard of the North British Railway

A horizontal cart balance or cart steelyard has grooved plates, mounted on pivoted frames, to receive the wheels of a cart. The movement of the frames is transferred to a conventional steelyard, mounted on a post, by a horizontal chain. In 1870, a patent was granted to the North British Railway for a similar apparatus to weigh railway waggons. A printed paper chart is mounted behind the steelyard weight, which has a pin attached. When the waggon is in place the pin is made to strike the chart, providing an automatic record of the weight.

== Scandinavian variant ==
A Scandinavian steelyard is a variant which consists of a bar with a fixed weight attached to one end, a movable pivot point, and an attachment point for the object to be weighed at the other end. Once the object to be weighed is attached to its end of the bar, the pivot point, which is frequently a loop at the end of a cord or chain, is moved until the bar is balanced. The bar is calibrated so that the object's weight can be read off directly from the position of the pivot. This type is known in Sweden, Denmark, Norway and Finland

== Gallery ==
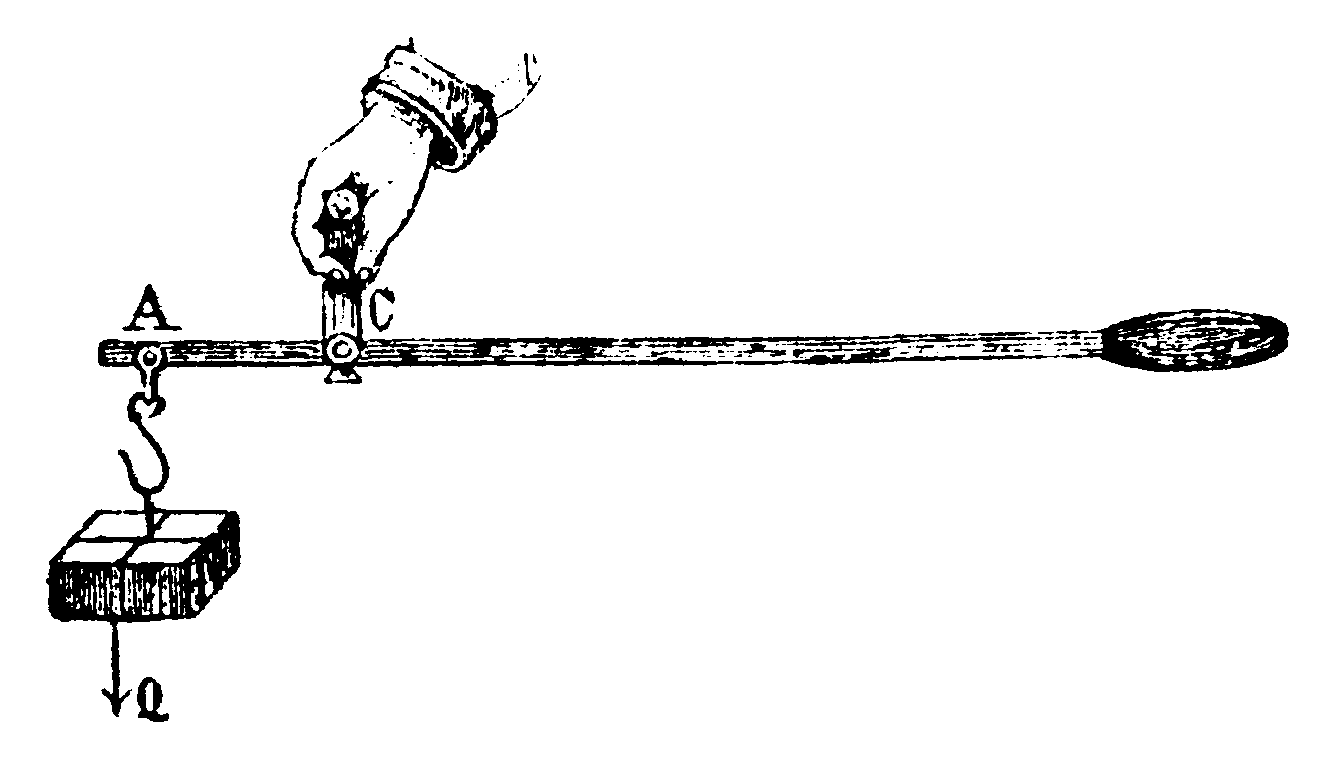
Scandinavian steelyard balance with moveable pivot

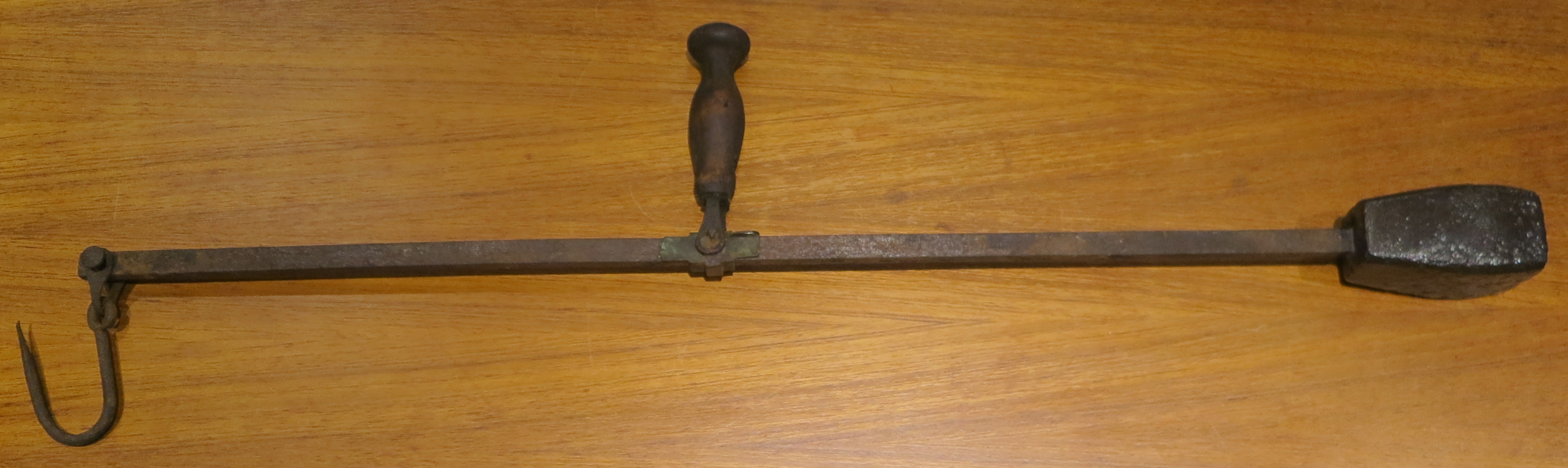
Scandinavian steelyard balance

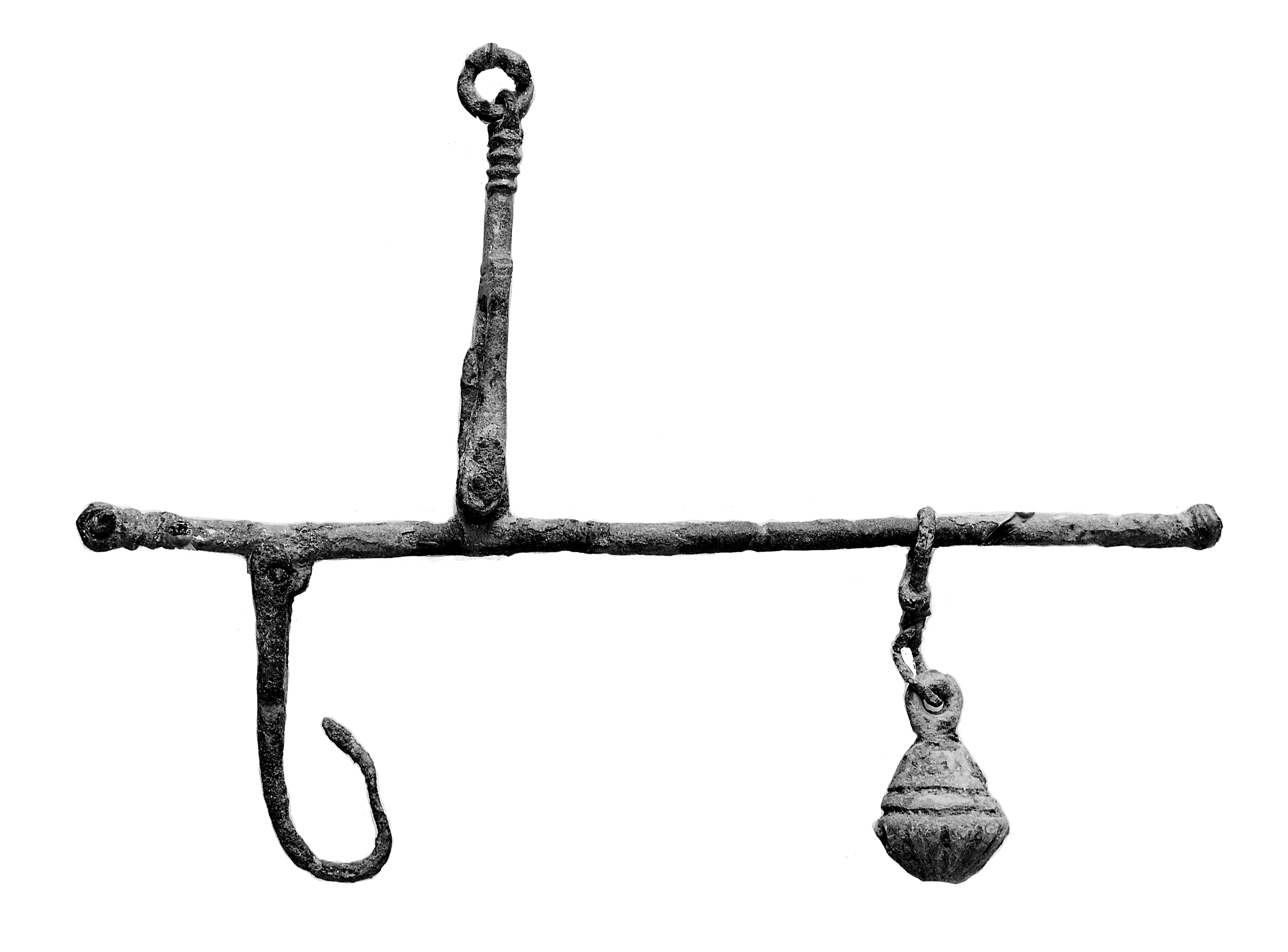
Steelyard balance from ancient Rome

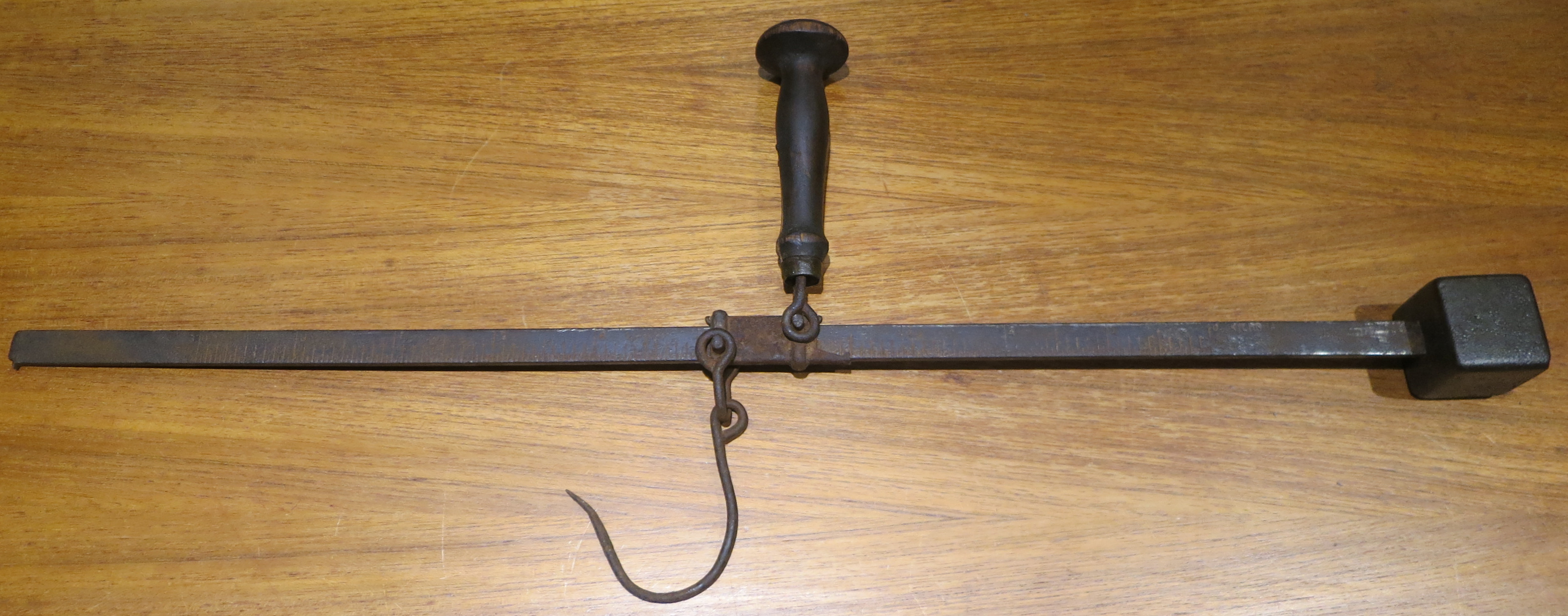
Swedish steelyard balance with fixed weight and movable, combined hook and handle

== See also ==
- Weigh house
