= 150th Infantry =

- Active: May 1918 – 15 June 1921
- Country: British India
- Allegiance: British Crown
- Branch: British Indian Army
- Type: Infantry
- Size: Three battalions
- Part of: 16th Indian Division
- Engagements: First World War; Third Anglo-Afghan War

The 150th Infantry (Note: Gaylor states that the regiment was called the 150th Indian Infantry whereas Perry says 150th Infantry. The latter seems more likely given the designation of, for examples, the pre-war 18th Infantry, 98th Infantry and 108th Infantry.) was an infantry regiment of the British Indian Army. It was formed in Mesopotamia in May 1918, saw service in the First World War and the Third Anglo-Afghan War, and was disbanded in June 1921.

== History ==
=== Background ===
Heavy losses suffered by the British Expeditionary Force on the Western Front following the German spring offensive in March 1918 resulted in a major reorganization of the Egyptian Expeditionary Force:

- two divisions – 52nd (Lowland) and 74th (Yeomanry) – were transferred to France in April; they were replaced by the 3rd (Lahore) and 7th (Meerut) Divisions from Mesopotamia;
- nine yeomanry regiments were dismounted, converted to machine gunners and sent to France at the end of the same month; the 4th and 5th Cavalry Divisions were reformed with Indian cavalry regiments withdrawn from France and the 15th (Imperial Service) Cavalry Brigade already in Egypt;
- the 10th (Irish), 53rd (Welsh), 60th (2/2nd London), and 75th Divisions were reduced to a single British battalion per brigade. They were reformed with nine Indian infantry battalions and an Indian pioneer battalion each. (Note: The remaining infantry division in the Egyptian Expeditionary Force in March 1918 – the 54th (East Anglian) Division – remained unaffected by these changes.)

In fact, the 75th Division already had four Indian battalions assigned, (Note: In March 1917, the Egyptian Expeditionary Force started forming the 75th Division, originally to be made up of Territorial Force battalions arriving from India. In May 1917, to speed up the formation of the division, it was decided to incorporate Indian battalions. To this end, the independent 29th Indian Brigade was broken up in June 1917 and its battalions posted to 75th Division.) so of the 36 battalions needed to reform the divisions, 22 were improvised by taking whole companies from existing units already on active service in Mesopotamia and Palestine to form the 150th Infantry (3 battalions), 151st Sikh Infantry (3), 152nd Punjabis (3), 153rd Punjabis (3), 154th Infantry (3), 155th Pioneers (2), 156th Infantry (1) and the 11th Gurkha Rifles (4). The donor units were then brought back up to strength by drafts. In the event, just 13 of the battalions were assigned to the divisions and the remaining nine were transferred from Mesopotamia to India in June 1918.

=== Formation ===
The regiment formed three battalions in Mesopotamia in May 1918 with complete companies posted from regiments serving in the 15th, 17th, and 18th Indian Divisions. All three battalions were transferred to India in June 1918. The 2nd Battalion later took part in the Third Anglo-Afghan War in 1919 as part of the 16th Indian Division. They were disbanded in India in 1920 and 1921.

=== Battalions ===
==== 1st Battalion ====
The 1st Battalion was formed in Mesopotamia in May 1918 by the transfer of complete companies from:

- 2nd Queen Victoria's Own Rajput Light Infantry
- 4th Prince Albert Victor's Rajputs
- 8th Rajputs
- 13th Rajputs (The Shekhawati Regiment)

The battalion was transferred from Mesopotamia to India in June 1918 and joined the Ahmednagar Brigade in the 6th Poona Divisional Area where it remained in until the end of the First World War. The battalion was disbanded on 15 April 1921.

==== 2nd Battalion ====
The 2nd Battalion was formed in Mesopotamia in May 1918 by the transfer of complete companies from:

- 6th Jat Light Infantry
- 9th Bhopal Infantry
- 10th Jats
- 104th Wellesley's Rifles

The battalion was transferred from Mesopotamia to India in June 1918 and joined the Rawalpindi Additional Brigade in the 2nd (Rawalpindi) Division where it remained in until the end of the First World War. In May 1919, it mobilized with the 45th (Jullundur) Brigade, 16th Indian Division and took part in the Third Anglo-Afghan War. The battalion was disbanded on 15 June 1921.

==== 3rd Battalion ====
The 3rd Battalion was formed in Mesopotamia in May 1918 by the transfer of complete companies from:

- 42nd Deoli Regiment
- 43rd Erinpura Regiment
- 44th Merwara Infantry
- 99th Deccan Infantry

The battalion was transferred from Mesopotamia to India in June 1918 and joined the Ahmednagar Brigade in the 6th Poona Divisional Area where it remained in until the end of the First World War. The battalion was disbanded on 30 November 1920.

== See also ==
- Indian Army during World War I

== Bibliography ==
- Becke, Archibald F. (1936). Order of Battle of Divisions Part 2A. The Territorial Force Mounted Divisions and the 1st-Line Territorial Force Divisions (42–56). London: HMSO. OCLC 4405016.
- Becke, Archibald F. (1937). Order of Battle of Divisions Part 2B. The 2nd-Line Territorial Force Divisions (57th–69th) with The Home-Service Divisions (71st–73rd) and 74th and 75th Divisions. London: HMSO. OCLC 4405016.
- Becke, Archibald F. (1938). Order of Battle of Divisions Part 3A. New Army Divisions (9–26). London: HMSO. OCLC 4405016.
- Gaylor, John (1996). Sons of John Company: The Indian and Pakistan Armies 1903–1991 (2nd ed.). Tunbridge Wells: Parapress. ISBN 1-898594-41-4.
- Perry, F.W. (1993). Order of Battle of Divisions Part 5B. Indian Army Divisions. Newport: Ray Westlake Military Books. ISBN 1-871167-23-X.
