= 154th Infantry =

- Active: 24 May 1918 – 15 May 1921
- Country: British India
- Allegiance: British Crown
- Branch: British Indian Army
- Type: Infantry
- Size: Three battalions
- Part of: 53rd (Welsh) Division; 75th Division; Derajat Brigade
- Engagements: First World War Sinai and Palestine Campaign Battle of Nablus Battle of Sharon Third Anglo-Afghan War

The 154th Infantry (Note: Gaylor states that the regiment was called the 154th Indian Infantry whereas Perry says 154th Infantry. The latter seems more likely given the designation of, for examples, the pre-war 18th Infantry, 98th Infantry and 108th Infantry.) was an infantry regiment of the British Indian Army. It was formed in Mesopotamia in May 1918, saw service in the First World War and the Third Anglo-Afghan War, and was disbanded in May 1921.

== History ==
=== Background ===
Heavy losses suffered by the British Expeditionary Force on the Western Front following the German spring offensive in March 1918 resulted in a major reorganization of the Egyptian Expeditionary Force:

- two divisions – 52nd (Lowland) and 74th (Yeomanry) – were transferred to France in April; they were replaced by the 3rd (Lahore) and 7th (Meerut) Divisions from Mesopotamia;
- nine yeomanry regiments were dismounted, converted to machine gunners and sent to France at the end of the same month; the 4th and 5th Cavalry Divisions were reformed with Indian cavalry regiments withdrawn from France and the 15th (Imperial Service) Cavalry Brigade already in Egypt;
- the 10th (Irish), 53rd (Welsh), 60th (2/2nd London), and 75th Divisions were reduced to a single British battalion per brigade. They were reformed with nine Indian infantry battalions and an Indian pioneer battalion each. (Note: The remaining infantry division in the Egyptian Expeditionary Force in March 1918 – the 54th (East Anglian) Division – remained unaffected by these changes.)

In fact, the 75th Division already had four Indian battalions assigned, (Note: In March 1917, the Egyptian Expeditionary Force started forming the 75th Division, originally to be made up of Territorial Force battalions arriving from India. In May 1917, to speed up the formation of the division, it was decided to incorporate Indian battalions. To this end, the independent 29th Indian Brigade was broken up in June 1917 and its battalions posted to 75th Division.) so of the 36 battalions needed to reform the divisions, 22 were improvised by taking whole companies from existing units already on active service in Mesopotamia and Palestine to form the 150th Infantry (3 battalions), 151st Sikh Infantry (3), 152nd Punjabis (3), 153rd Punjabis (3), 154th Infantry (3), 155th Pioneers (2), 156th Infantry (1) and the 11th Gurkha Rifles (4). The donor units were then brought back up to strength by drafts. In the event, just 13 of the battalions were assigned to the divisions and the remaining nine were transferred from Mesopotamia to India in June 1918.

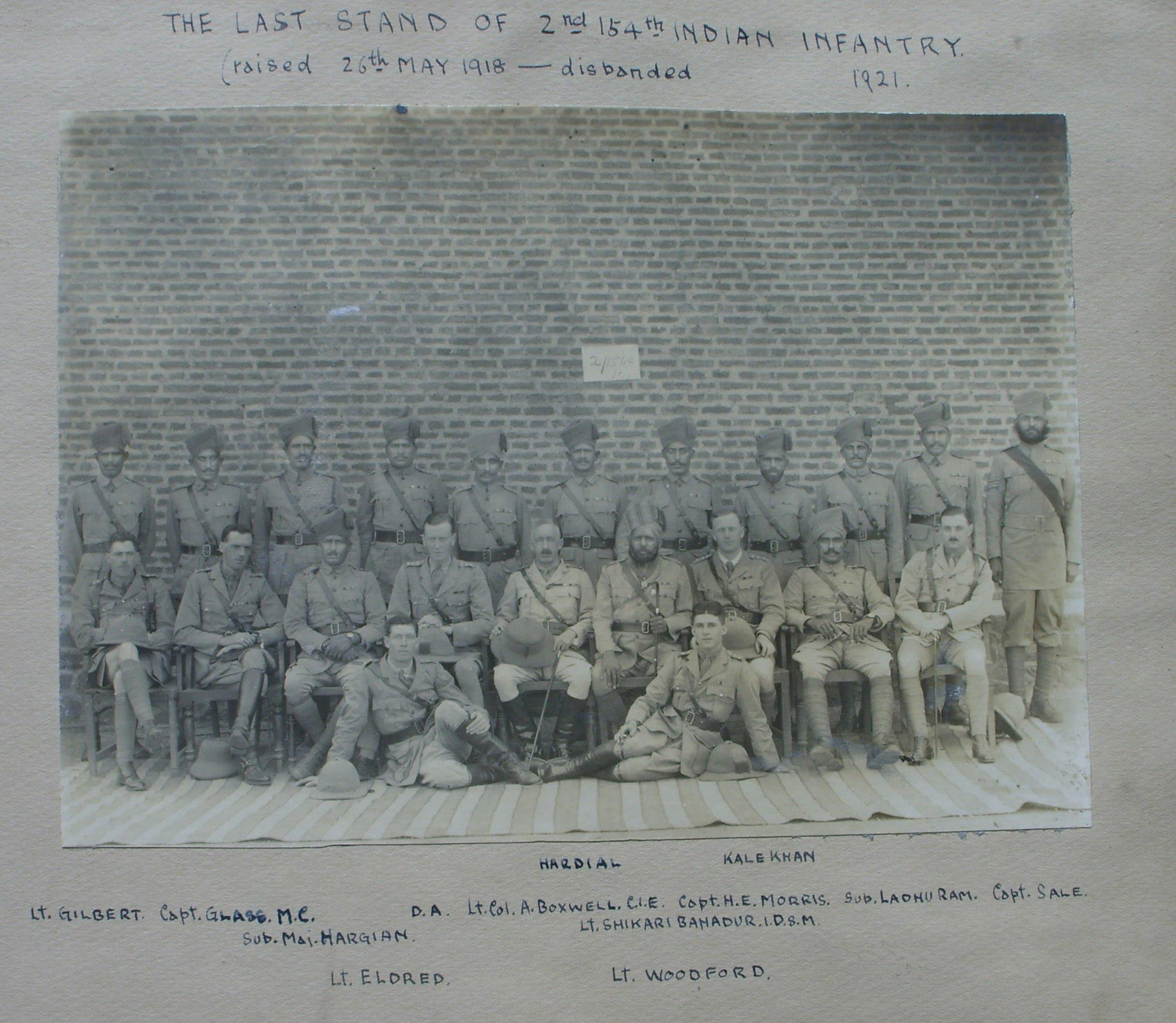
Captain Donald Clive Anderson with the last stand of the 2nd 154th Indian Infantry, raised 26th May 1918, disbanded 1921. Lt Gilbert, Captin Glass MC, Sub Major Hargian, Lt Eldred, Lt Col A Boxwell CIE, Captin HE Morris, Hardial, Kale Khan, Lt Shikari Banadur IDSM, Lt Shikari Bahanur IDSM, Lt Woodford, Sub Ladnu Ram, Captin Sale.

=== Formation ===
The regiment was formed with three battalions in Mesopotamia in May 1918 by the transfer of complete companies posted from regiments serving in the 14th, 15th, 17th, and 18th Indian Divisions. The 1st Battalion was transferred to India in June 1918 and later took part in the Third Anglo-Afghan War in 1919 as part of the Derajat Brigade. The other two battalions were transferred to Egypt in July 1918, were assigned to British divisions and took part in the final Allied offensive of the Sinai and Palestine Campaign (the Battles of Megiddo).

== Battalions ==
=== 1st Battalion ===
The 1st Battalion was formed in Mesopotamia in May 1918 by the transfer of complete companies from:

- 94th Russell's Infantry
- 95th Russell's Infantry
- 96th Berar Infantry
- 97th Deccan Infantry

The battalion was transferred from Mesopotamia to India in June 1918 and joined the Derajat Brigade on the North-West Frontier where it remained in until the end of the First World War. In May 1919, part of the battalion mobilized with the Derajat Brigade and took part in the Third Anglo-Afghan War. The battalion was disbanded in 1919.

=== 2nd Battalion ===
The 2nd Battalion was formed at Basra on 24 May 1918 by the transfer of complete companies from:

- 102nd King Edward's Own Grenadiers
- 108th Infantry
- 119th Infantry (The Mooltan Regiment)
- 122nd Rajputana Infantry

It embarked on 19 June for Egypt, arriving at Suez on 5 July and moved to Qantara. On 16 July, it entrained and arrived at Lydda the next day. The battalion joined the 233rd Brigade, 75th Division at Rantis on 25 July. It remained with the division for the rest of the Sinai and Palestine Campaign, taking part in the Battle of Sharon (19 September 1918). The division was then withdrawn into XXI Corps Reserve near et Tire where it was employed on salvage work and road making. On 22 October it moved to Haifa where it was when the Armistice of Mudros came into effect and the war ended.

On 13 November, the 75th Division concentrated at Lydda and by 10 December had moved back to Qantara. On 18 January 1919, instructions were received that the Indian battalions would be returned to India as transport became available. The battalion was disbanded on 15 May 1921.

=== 3rd Battalion ===
The 3rd Battalion was formed in Mesopotamia in May 1918 by the transfer of complete companies from:

- 112th Infantry
- 113th Infantry
- 114th Mahrattas
- 116th Mahrattas

The battalion disembarked at Suez on 5 July and reached Lydda on 17 July. It joined the 158th Brigade, 53rd (Welsh) Division on 3 August near Jerusalem. It remained with the division for the rest of the Sinai and Palestine Campaign, taking part in the Battle of Nablus (18–21 September 1918). At the end of the battle, the division was employed on salvage work and working on the Nablus road.

On 27 October, the division started moving to Alexandria even before the Armistice of Mudros came into effect on 31 October, thereby ending the war against the Ottoman Empire. It completed its concentration at Alexandria on 15 November. The division received demobilization instructions on 20 December 1918. The Indian infantry battalions returned to India as transports became available and the division was reduced to cadre by 7 June 1919. The battalion was disbanded in 1919.

== See also ==
- Indian Army during World War I

== Bibliography ==
- Becke, Archibald F. (1936). Order of Battle of Divisions Part 2A. The Territorial Force Mounted Divisions and the 1st-Line Territorial Force Divisions (42–56). London: HMSO. OCLC 4405016.
- Becke, Archibald F. (1937). Order of Battle of Divisions Part 2B. The 2nd-Line Territorial Force Divisions (57th–69th) with The Home-Service Divisions (71st–73rd) and 74th and 75th Divisions. London: HMSO. OCLC 4405016.
- Becke, Archibald F. (1938). Order of Battle of Divisions Part 3A. New Army Divisions (9–26). London: HMSO. OCLC 4405016.
- Gaylor, John (1996). Sons of John Company: The Indian and Pakistan Armies 1903–1991 (2nd ed.). Tunbridge Wells: Parapress. ISBN 1-898594-41-4.
- Perry, F.W. (1993). Order of Battle of Divisions Part 5B. Indian Army Divisions. Newport: Ray Westlake Military Books. ISBN 1-871167-23-X.
