= 153rd Punjabis =

153rd Punjabis / 153rd Rifles
- Active: 18 May 1918 – 24 June 1922
- Country: British India
- Allegiance: British Crown
- Branch: British Indian Army
- Type: Infantry
- Size: Three battalions
- Part of: 53rd (Welsh) Division
- Engagements: First World War Sinai and Palestine Campaign Battle of Nablus

The 153rd Punjabis – also designated 153rd Rifles, see nomenclature (below) – was an infantry regiment of the British Indian Army. It was formed in Mesopotamia and Palestine in May 1918, saw service in the Sinai and Palestine Campaign in the First World War, and was disbanded in June 1922.

== Background ==
Heavy losses suffered by the British Expeditionary Force on the Western Front following the German spring offensive in March 1918 resulted in a major reorganization of the Egyptian Expeditionary Force:

- two divisions – 52nd (Lowland) and 74th (Yeomanry) – were transferred to France in April; they were replaced by the 3rd (Lahore) and 7th (Meerut) Divisions from Mesopotamia;
- nine yeomanry regiments were dismounted, converted to machine gunners and sent to France at the end of the same month; the 4th and 5th Cavalry Divisions were reformed with Indian cavalry regiments withdrawn from France and the 15th (Imperial Service) Cavalry Brigade already in Egypt;
- the 10th (Irish), 53rd (Welsh), 60th (2/2nd London), and 75th Divisions were reduced to a single British battalion per brigade. They were reformed with nine Indian infantry battalions and an Indian pioneer battalion each. (Note: The remaining infantry division in the Egyptian Expeditionary Force in March 1918 – the 54th (East Anglian) Division – remained unaffected by these changes.)

In fact, the 75th Division already had four Indian battalions assigned, (Note: In March 1917, the Egyptian Expeditionary Force started forming the 75th Division, originally to be made up of Territorial Force battalions arriving from India. In May 1917, to speed up the formation of the division, it was decided to incorporate Indian battalions. To this end, the independent 29th Indian Brigade was broken up in June 1917 and its battalions posted to 75th Division.) so of the 36 battalions needed to reform the divisions, 22 were improvised by taking whole companies from existing units already on active service in Mesopotamia and Palestine to form the 150th Infantry (3 battalions), 151st Sikh Infantry (3), 152nd Punjabis (3), 153rd Punjabis (3), 154th Infantry (3), 155th Pioneers (2), 156th Infantry (1) and the 11th Gurkha Rifles (4). The donor units were then brought back up to strength by drafts. In the event, just 13 of the battalions were assigned to the divisions and the remaining nine were transferred from Mesopotamia to India in June 1918.

== History ==
The 153rd Punjabis was formed of three battalions in May 1918. The 1st Battalion was formed in Mesopotamia with companies posted from battalions serving in the 14th, 15th, and 18th Indian Divisions. It was transferred to Egypt during June and July 1918. In contrast, the 2nd and 3rd Battalions were formed in Palestine with companies posted from battalions already serving in the theatre, particularly from the 3rd (Lahore) and 7th (Meerut) Divisions.

All three battalions were assigned to the 53rd (Welsh) Division in June and August and remained with the division for the rest of the Sinai and Palestine Campaign, taking part in the Battle of Nablus (18–21 September 1918). At the end of the battle, the division was employed on salvage work and working on the Nablus road.

On 27 October, the division started moving to Alexandria even before the Armistice of Mudros came into effect on 31 October, thereby ending the war against the Ottoman Empire. It completed its concentration at Alexandria on 15 November. The division received demobilization instructions on 20 December 1918. The Indian infantry battalions returned to India as transports became available and 159th Brigade was reduced to cadre by 7 March 1919. The battalions were disbanded in India in 1921 and 1922.

=== Nomenclature ===
Oddly, the designation of the regiment varied between the battalions. The 1st and 2nd Battalions were 153rd Punjabis whereas the 3rd Battalion was 153rd Rifles, hence 1st Battalion, 153rd Punjabis, 2nd Battalion, 153rd Punjabis and 3rd Battalion, 153rd Rifles. Other sources designate all three battalions as 153rd Infantry.

=== 1st Battalion ===
The 1st Battalion was formed at Diyala on 18 May 1918 by the transfer of complete companies from:

- 82nd Punjabis
- 87th Punjabis
- 89th Punjabis
- 90th Punjabis

The battalion moved to Amara on 23 May and left for Egypt on 20 June. It disembarked at Suez on 5 July and reached Lydda on 17 July. The battalion joined the 159th Brigade, 53rd (Welsh) Division on 2 August 1918 near Jerusalem. 1st Battalion, 153rd Punjabis was disbanded on 15 June 1921.

=== 2nd Battalion ===
The 2nd Battalion was formed at Sarafand (now Tzrifin) on 27 May 1918 by the transfer of complete companies from:

- 74th Punjabis
- 91st Punjabis (Light Infantry)
- 92nd Punjabis
- 93rd Burma Infantry

The battalion joined the 159th Brigade, 53rd (Welsh) Division on 5 June 1918 near Ram Allah. 2nd Battalion, 153rd Punjabis was disbanded on 15 June 1921.

=== 3rd Battalion ===
The 3rd Battalion was also formed at Sarafand on 24 May 1918 by the transfer of complete companies from:

- 105th Mahratta Light Infantry
- 123rd Outram's Rifles
- 2nd Battalion, 124th Duchess of Connaught's Own Baluchistan Infantry
- 125th Napier's Rifles

The battalion joined the 158th Brigade, 53rd (Welsh) Division on 10 June 1918 at Et Taiyibe. 3rd Battalion, 153rd Rifles was disbanded on 24 June 1922.

== See also ==
- Indian Army during World War I

== Bibliography ==
- Becke, Archibald F. (1936). Order of Battle of Divisions Part 2A. The Territorial Force Mounted Divisions and the 1st-Line Territorial Force Divisions (42–56). London: HMSO. OCLC 4405016.
- Becke, Archibald F. (1937). Order of Battle of Divisions Part 2B. The 2nd-Line Territorial Force Divisions (57th–69th) with The Home-Service Divisions (71st–73rd) and 74th and 75th Divisions. London: HMSO. OCLC 4405016.
- Becke, Archibald F. (1938). Order of Battle of Divisions Part 3A. New Army Divisions (9–26). London: HMSO. OCLC 4405016.
- Gaylor, John (1996). Sons of John Company: The Indian and Pakistan Armies 1903–1991 (2nd ed.). Tunbridge Wells: Parapress. ISBN 1-898594-41-4.
- Perry, F.W. (1993). Order of Battle of Divisions Part 5B. Indian Army Divisions. Newport: Ray Westlake Military Books. ISBN 1-871167-23-X.
