= Cheshire Brigade =

Cheshire Brigade 159th (Cheshire) Brigade
- Active: 1900–1919
- Country: United Kingdom
- Branch: Volunteer Force/Territorial Force
- Type: Infantry
- Size: Brigade
- Part of: Welsh Division; 53rd (Welsh) Division
- Garrison/HQ: Volunteer Street drill hall, Chester
- Engagements: Landing at Suvla Bay; First Battle of Gaza; Second Battle of Gaza; Third Battle of Gaza; Capture of Tel el Khuweilfe; Capture of Jerusalem; Affair at Zamby; Defence of Jerusalem; Battle of Tell 'Asur; Battle of Nablus

Commanders
- Notable commanders: Brigadier-General Noel Money

The Cheshire Brigade, later 159th (Cheshire) Brigade, was an infantry formation of Britain's Volunteer Force created in 1900. It was carried over into the Territorial Force in 1908 and mobilised on the outbreak of the First World War. It fought at Gallipoli and in Palestine as part of 53rd (Welsh) Division. By the end of the war all its Cheshire units had left and it was composed of one Welsh battalion with the remainder drawn from the British Indian Army. It was not reformed after the war.

== Volunteer Force ==
For its first three decades, the Volunteer Force of Victorian Britain, created in 1859, consisted of a large number of independent units raised on a local basis and without any higher formations. The Cardwell Reforms of 1872 affiliated the Rifle Volunteers to the county regiments of the Regular Army. Edward Stanhope, Secretary of State for War, then integrated the individual Volunteer units into the Army's Mobilisation Scheme in 1888. In time of war the Volunteers would assemble in their own brigades at key points, while in peacetime these brigades provided a structure for collective training. Under this scheme the five Volunteer Battalions of the Cheshire Regiment were spread between the Mersey Brigade at Liverpool (1st and 2nd VBs) and the Welsh Border Brigade at Shrewsbury (3rd, 4th and 5th VBs). In the mid-1890s these were shifted around, the 2nd VB moving to the Welsh Border Brigade and the 3rd, 4th and 5th joining a new Cheshire and Lancashire Brigade based in Salford, with Warrington (then part of Lancashire) nominated as its place of assembly. Finally, in 1900 the Volunteer Infantry Brigades were reorganised and in May the five Volunteer Battalions of the Cheshires formed their own Cheshire Brigade with headquarters (HQ) at Chester. The officer commanding 22 Regimental District at Chester was ex officio the brigade commander and the Brigade major was usually a retired Regular officer, but other staff (supply and transport officer, senior medical officer) were seconded from the Volunteers.

== Territorial Force ==
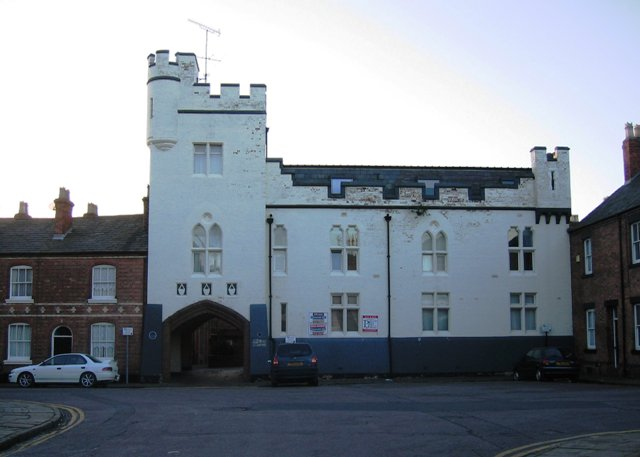
Albion Street drill hall, headquarters of the Cheshire Brigade and of 5th (Earl of Chester's) Battalion, Cheshire Regiment

When the Volunteers were subsumed into the new Territorial Force under the Haldane Reforms in 1908, a divisional structure was introduced and the Cheshire Brigade was incorporated into the TF's new Welsh Division. In the reorganisation the 2nd and 3rd Volunteer Battalions of the Cheshire Regiment were amalgamated and the four were renumbered as the 4th–7th Battalions of the Cheshire Regiment. On the outbreak of war in August 1914 the brigade was constituted as follows:

- Brigade HQ at Drill Hall, Chester
- 4th Battalion at Birkenhead
- 5th (Earl of Chester's) Battalion at Chester
- 6th Battalion at Stockport
- 7th Battalion at Macclesfield
- No 2 (Cheshire) Section, Welsh Divisional Signal Company, Royal Engineers
- Cheshire Brigade Company, Welsh Divisional Transport and Supply Column, Army Service Corps, at Birkenhead

== First World War ==
=== Mobilisation ===
On the outbreak of war on 4 August 1914, the Welsh Division's units were at their annual camp when they were ordered to return to their headquarters to mobilise. They gathered at their war stations by 11 August. On that date, TF units were invited to volunteer for Overseas Service and on 15 August the War Office issued instructions to separate those men who had signed up for Home Service only, and form these into reserve units. On 31 August, the formation of a reserve or 2nd Line unit was authorised for each 1st Line unit where 60 percent or more of the men had volunteered for Overseas Service. The titles of these 2nd Line units would be the same as the original, but distinguished by a '2/' prefix. In this way duplicate battalions, brigades and divisions were created, mirroring those TF formations being sent overseas.

The 5th and 6th Cheshires were among the earliest TF battalions to volunteer and left the brigade to join the British Expeditionary Force (BEF) on the Western Front. Initially they were replaced in the 1st Cheshire Brigade by their second line battalions, the 2/5th and 2/6th, but although uniformed and partially equipped, these units were totally unarmed. The Welsh Division had concentrated in the Northampton area by the end of August 1914, where training was frequently interrupted by trench digging operations along the East Coast. On 18 November 1914 the Welsh Division was warned for garrison service in India, but this order was cancelled on 25 November. Nevertheless, preparations continued for service overseas, and in April the unarmed and untrained 2nd Line battalions were replaced by other TF units that were fit for service (the 2/5th and 2/6th Cheshires joined the 2/1st Cheshire Brigade in the 2nd Welsh Division). The Cheshire Brigade gained two 1st Line battalions of the Welsh Regiment previously assigned to the independent South Wales Brigade. On 13 May 1915, the 1st Welsh Division became the 53rd (Welsh) Division and the Cheshire Brigade was designated the 159th (Cheshire) Brigade. It had been at Cambridge since December 1914, now it moved to Bedford.

=== Order of Battle ===
The brigade had the following composition during the war:

- 1/4th Battalion, Cheshire Regiment – left for Western Front 31 May 1918
- 1/5th (Earl of Chester's) Battalion, Cheshire Regiment – left for Western Front 14 February 1915
- 1/6th Battalion, Cheshire Regiment – left for Western Front 9 November 1914
- 1/7th Battalion, Cheshire Regiment – left for Western Front 1 June 1918
- No 2 (Cheshire) Section, Welsh Divisional Signal Company, RE
- Cheshire Brigade Company, Welsh Divisional T & S Column, ASC – left in England
- 1/4th Battalion, Welsh Regiment – joined 17 April 1915; amalgamated 30 July 1918
- 1/5th Battalion, Welsh Regiment – joined 17 April 1915; amalgamated 30 July 1918
- 248 (Wessex) Horse Transport Company, ASC – joined 17 March 1916
- 159th Machine Gun Company, Machine Gun Corps (MGC) – formed 20 April 1916; joined 53rd Battalion, MGC, April 1918
- 159th Trench Mortar Battery – joined 28 June 1917
- 3rd Battalion, 152nd Punjabis – joined 4 June 1918
- 2nd Battalion 153rd Punjabis – joined 5 June 1918
- 4th/5th Battalion, Welsh Regiment – formed 30 July 1918
- 1st Battalion, 153rd Punjabis – joined 2 August 1918

=== Gallipoli ===
On 2 July 1915 the 53rd (Welsh) Division was ordered to refit for service in the Mediterranean. It embarked at Devonport and the transports reached Alexandria between 25 and 30 July before going on to Lemnos between 29 July and 7 August. On the night of 8/9 August the division landed at Suvla Bay on the Gallipoli peninsula, where an assault landing had been made two days before.

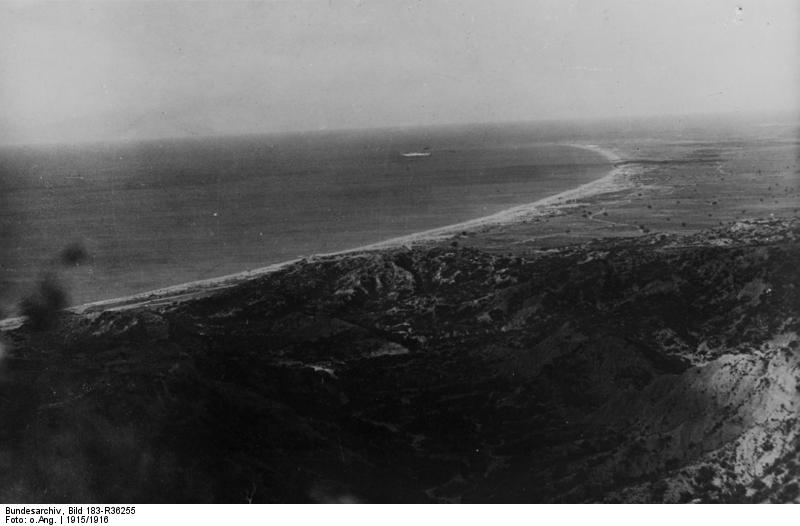
Suvla Bay, viewed from the hills in 1915.

159th Brigade completed its landing at C Beach in the morning and its four battalions were immediately placed under the command of Brig-Gen W.H. Sitwell of 34th Brigade, 11th (Northern) Division, who was in charge of scattered units that were 'in a desperate condition' after a failed attack on Scimitar Hill and the W Hills. 159th Brigade arrived in time to see the troops of 33rd Brigade retreating to the beach from Scimitar Hill 'like a crowd streaming away from a football match'. The staff of 159th Brigade had neither maps nor any information on the situation, but were ordered to send two battalions to reinforce Sitwell, who was 'somewhere over there in the bush'. The staff therefore spread out in a line on a front of nearly half a mile before finding him. Next morning the brigade was ordered to capture Scimitar Hill, but most of its other two battalions could not be found and it started without them. The advance by 1/4th Cheshires, 1/5th Welsh and 1 1/2 companies of 1/7th Cheshires began from trenches north of Sulajik at 06.00 on the morning of 10 August with no cohesion. Fire from skirmishers and unconfirmed rumours of a Turkish counter-attack 'threw back the leading troops in disorder, despite acts of individual gallantry'. 158th (North Wales) Brigade, coming up in support but equally ignorant of the terrain or the situation, met parties of 159th Brigade coming back in full retreat, and the whole advance came to nothing. A further attack was called off. Afterwards the corps commander, Lt-Gen Sir Frederick Stopford, complained that 53rd (W) Division was a 'sucked orange', with its best-trained battalions having gone to the Western Front. After the failed attack on Scimitar Hill, Stopford said, the division was 'merely losing heart from ignorance of the situation and lack of intelligent orders', as a result it was 'only a danger' and might 'bolt at any minute'. But the front line at Suvla Bay was now quiet: a staff officer found men of 53rd (W) Division in a line of lightly dug trenches with men standing about on the parapet and even cooking in front of the trenches, with no Turks in sight. One final fruitless attack on the W Hills was made by 11th (N) Division and 2nd Mounted Division, with 53rd (W) Division instructed to 'take advantage of any opportunity to gain ground'.

After the failure of the Suvla Bay operations, the troops dug in and endured months of trench warfare and sickness. Due to casualties, the 1/4th and 1/5th Welsh had to be amalgamated as the 4th Welsh Composite Battalion. The number of sick grew worse after a three-day blizzard began on 27 November, and 53rd (W) Division was greatly reduced. 159th Brigade was attached to 2nd Mounted Division from 29 November to 9 December while preparations were made for evacuation. On 11 and 12 December the survivors of 53rd (W) Division were taken off the beach to Mudros, where they transhipped to transports to take them back to Alexandria.

=== Egypt ===
53rd (Welsh) Division began arriving at Alexandria on 20 December and entrained for Wardan, where the last unit arrived on 23 December. Once in Egypt the division was slowly rebuilt from drafts and returned casualties. The 1/4th and 1/5th Welsh resumed their separate identities on 20 February 1916. The division took its place in the Suez Canal defences, with 159th Brigade in the Beni Salama sector. 159th Brigade was not engaged at the Battle of Romani on 4–5 August.

=== Palestine ===
In late 1916 the Egyptian Expeditionary Force (EEF) initiated the Sinai and Palestine Campaign, during which 159th Brigade participated in the following actions:

- First Battle of Gaza 26–27 March 1917: 159th Brigade arrived late for the attack on the Ali Muntar position and the 1/4th Cheshires and 1/5th Welsh had to advance at the double to attack Clay Hill; the brigade had no artillery observers with it, and the unsupported attack was held up. After taking Clay Hill the brigade was ordered to withdraw. Casualties had been 90 killed, 606 wounded and 80 missing across the four battalions.
- Second Battle of Gaza 17–19 April 1917: the brigade attacked with a single Mark I Male tank in support. The brigade took its objective without opposition, but once again the attack was halted and the troops dug in.
- Third Battle of Gaza 27 October–7 November 1917: 53rd (W) Division marched off into the waterless hills before attacking, and the 4th and 5th Welsh suffered severely from thirst while driving in the Turkish positions, the 7th Cheshires protecting their flank. The 4th Welsh named the position they took as 'Stone High Hill'. Next day the brigade broke two Turkish counter-attacks. On 6 November a general advance began.
- Capture of Tel el Khuweilfe 7 November 1917: the situation was confused by dense fog, and after the advance the Turks still held Hill 1250 between 159th and 160th (Welsh) Brigades, 7th Cheshires running into a strong position across a ravine. It was mid-afternoon. before Brig-Gen Money was able to disengage 5th Welsh and send it to stop a Turkish counter-attack from Hill 1250 that had nearly reached Divisional HQ.
- Capture of Jerusalem 7–9 December 1917: the advance from Hebron by 'Mott's Detachment' was led by 7th Cheshires under Lt-Col H.M. Lawrence, supported by cycle troops and sappers, followed by 159th Brigade and then the rest of the division. The Turks abandoned their trenches under artillery fire and 7th Cheshires pushed on to Solomon's Pools. Jerusalem fell to 60th (2/2nd London) Division on 9 December.
- Affair at Zamby, 17–21 December: 7th Cheshires attempted to seize the hill of Ras ez Zamby on 17 December but ran into enfilade fire; 160th Brigade cleared 'Cheshire Ridge' on 21 December.
- Defence of Jerusalem 27–30 December 1917
- Battle of Tell 'Asur 9–12 March 1918: On the night of 6/7 March 159th Brigade occupied the 5 miles (8.0 km) of No man's land between the two armies to the jumping-off line selected for the next attack. Then early on the morning of 9 March the brigade attacked, 4th Cheshires supported by 7th Cheshires and 4th Welsh supported by 5th Welsh. The brigade advanced over a bare open ridge, but artillery support helped. The final objectives, however, proved too strong, and had to be taken next day. After a four-day operation 159th Brigade attacked before dawn on 12 March and took most of its objectives without opposition, with 4th Welsh taking a number of prisoners.

The German spring offensive on the Western Front led to urgent calls for reinforcements for the BEF, and the EEF was forced to relinquish many of its veteran battalions. 53rd (Welsh) Division was among those changed to an Indian Army establishment of one British and three Indian battalions to each brigade. 159th Brigade lost its two remaining Cheshire battalions, while the 4th and 5th Welsh combined into a single battalion once more. The brigade was joined by three newly-formed Indian Army battalions. (Note: 3/152 Punjabis formed at Sarafand al-Amar on 24 May from companies of 20th, 27th and 28th Punjabis; joined near Ramallah. 1/153 Punjabis formed at Diyala on 18 May from companies of 82nd, 87th and 90th Punjabis; travelled via Suez and Lydda, and joined near Jerusalem. 2/153 Punjabis formed at Sarafand on 27 May from companies of 91st and 92nd Punjabis and 93rd Burma Infantry; joined near Ramallah.)

The reformed brigade then took part in the final campaign (the Battles of Megiddo) fighting at the Battle of Nablus, 18–21 September 1918. The battle began after sunset. 159th Brigade's allotted route gave it no option but to make a frontal attack. 3/152nd and 1/153rd Punjabis captured the first two objectives, Bidston and Forfar Hills, by 23.00, then the 1/153rd went on to capture Point 2430 but was now too weak to take the third objective, Kew Hill. 4th/5th Welsh had been protecting the right flank, driving off two wild Turkish counter-attacks, and now the battalion assisted 153rd onto Kew Hill by 00.45, and a company of the Welsh went forward and took Hill 2401, capturing some machine guns. 2/153rd following behind sent a company to clear the south end of Bidston Hill and then came into reserve behind 4th/5th Welsh. Continuing from Forfar Hill, 3/152nd had the severest fighting of the day and eventually was driven back from Malul. After the artillery was turned on the garrison of Malul 4th/5th Welsh and 2/153rd took it without much trouble the following evening. 53rd Division resumed its advance on 20 September, with 159th Brigade echeloned behind 158th. 159th Brigade's attack towards Ras el Tawil was cancelled because the ground over which it was to attack had been exposed by a Turkish counter-attack, but Brig-Gen Money was permitted to act independently. He sent 2/153rd Punjabis to attack from another direction, and the battalion successfully occupied the objective. By now the Desert Mounted Corps had cut in behind the Turks, and a general advance was ordered. 53rd Division advanced with 159th Brigade on the left, taking thousands of prisoners.

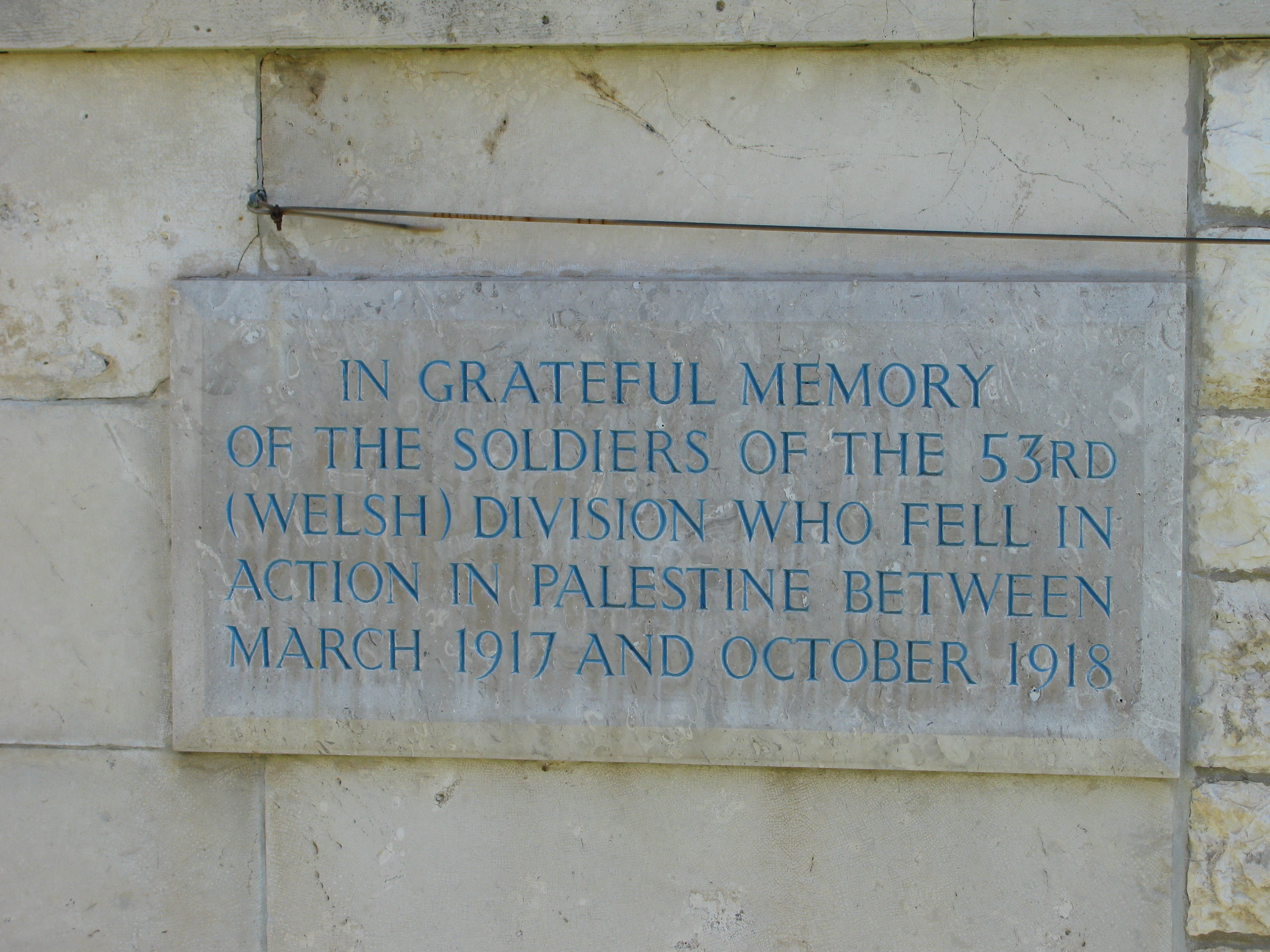
53rd (Welsh) Division commemoration plaque at Ramleh Commonwealth War Graves Commission Cemetery.

For a few days after the battle 53rd Division was employed in clearing the battlefield and working on the Nablus road. It then moved back by way of Tell 'Asur (26 September) to Ramla (12 October). On 27 October it entrained for Alexandria and was en route when the campaign was ended by the Armistice of Mudros.

Orders for demobilisation arrived on 20 December and Indian units began to leave. By 7 March 1919 159th Brigade had been reduced to a cadre. On 15 June the last British cadres moved to Port Said for transport home.

=== Brigade commanders ===
The following officers commanded the brigade during World War I:

- Colonel E.A. Cowans, appointed 25 June 1914, promoted to Brigadier-General 5 August 1914 on the outbreak of war; wounded 14 August 1915
- Lieutenant-Colonel H. Backhouse (7th Cheshire), acting, 14 August 1915
- Brig-Gen W.J.C. Butler, 24 August 1914
- Brig-Gen A.E. Cowans resumed command 21 September 1915; invalided 12 November 1915
- Lt-Col G.H. Swindells (4th Cheshire), acting, 12 November 1915
- Brig-Gen R.O'B. Taylor, 19 November 1915
- Lt-Col H.J. Kinsman, acting, 27 March 1916
- Brig-Gen J.H.Du B. Travers, 29 March 1916, sick 27 October 1917
- Lt-Col H.M. Lawrence (7th Cheshire), acting, 27 October 1917
- Brig-Gen Noel Money (formerly 2/4th Royal West Kent Regiment), 28 October 1917

== Postwar ==
The TF was reformed in 1920 and then reorganised as the Territorial Army (TA) in 1921. 53rd (Welsh) Division was reconstituted, but 159th Brigade was now subtitled '(Welsh Border)' and comprised battalions of the Herefordshire Regiment and the Monmouthshire Regiment. Of the four battalions of the original Cheshire Brigade, the 4th and 5th Cheshires had been amalgamated, and the 6th Cheshires had been merged into an artillery unit. The two remaining battalions (4th/5th (Earl of Chester's) and 7th Bns) formed part of 166th (South Lancashire and Cheshire) Infantry Brigade in 55th (West Lancashire) Infantry Division. By the outbreak of the Second World War the TA battalions of the Cheshires had reorganised as unbrigaded divisional machine gun battalions and 166th Brigade had dropped the 'Cheshire' part of its subtitle.

During the Second World War, the 159th (Welsh Border) Infantry Brigade served with 11th Armoured Division in the campaign in North West Europe.

== External sources ==
- The Long, Long Trail
- Orders of Battle at Patriot Files
