= 11th Gurkha Rifles =

- Active: 18 May 1918 – 12 April 1922
- Country: British India
- Allegiance: British Crown
- Branch: British Indian Army
- Type: Infantry
- Size: Four battalions
- Part of: 1st (Peshawar) Division; 53rd (Welsh) Division
- Engagements: First World War Sinai and Palestine Campaign Battle of Nablus (1918) Third Anglo-Afghan War
- Battle Honours: Afghanistan 1919

The 11th Gurkha Rifles was a Gurkha regiment of the British Indian Army. It was formed in Mesopotamia and Palestine in May 1918, saw active service in the First World War and the Third Anglo-Afghan War, and was disbanded in April 1922.

== History ==
=== Background ===
Heavy losses suffered by the British Expeditionary Force on the Western Front following the German spring offensive in March 1918 resulted in a major reorganization of the Egyptian Expeditionary Force:

- two divisions – 52nd (Lowland) and 74th (Yeomanry) – were transferred to France in April; they were replaced by the 3rd (Lahore) and 7th (Meerut) Divisions from Mesopotamia;
- nine yeomanry regiments were dismounted, converted to machine gunners and sent to France at the end of the same month; the 4th and 5th Cavalry Divisions were reformed with Indian cavalry regiments withdrawn from France and the 15th (Imperial Service) Cavalry Brigade already in Egypt;
- the 10th (Irish), 53rd (Welsh), 60th (2/2nd London), and 75th Divisions were reduced to a single British battalion per brigade. They were reformed with nine Indian infantry battalions and an Indian pioneer battalion each. (Note: The remaining infantry division in the Egyptian Expeditionary Force in March 1918 – the 54th (East Anglian) Division – remained unaffected by these changes.)

In fact, the 75th Division already had four Indian battalions assigned, (Note: In March 1917, the Egyptian Expeditionary Force started forming the 75th Division, originally to be made up of Territorial Force battalions arriving from India. In May 1917, to speed up the formation of the division, it was decided to incorporate Indian battalions. To this end, the independent 29th Indian Brigade was broken up in June 1917 and its battalions posted to 75th Division.) so of the 36 battalions needed to reform the divisions, 22 were improvised by taking whole companies from existing units already on active service in Mesopotamia and Palestine to form the 150th Infantry (3 battalions), 151st Sikh Infantry (3), 152nd Punjabis (3), 153rd Punjabis (3), 154th Infantry (3), 155th Pioneers (2), 156th Infantry (1) and the 11th Gurkha Rifles (4). The donor units were then brought back up to strength by drafts. In the event, just 13 of the battalions were assigned to the divisions and the remaining nine were transferred from Mesopotamia to India in June 1918.

=== Formation ===
The regiment formed four battalions. The first three were formed in Mesopotamia in May 1918 with companies posted from Gurkha battalions (and the 39th Garhwal Rifles) serving in the 14th, 15th, 17th, and 18th Indian Divisions. They were transferred to Bombay (Mumbai) in June 1918. All three later took part in the Third Anglo-Afghan War in 1919 as part of the 1st (Peshawar) Division. They were disbanded in India in 1921 and 1922 with personnel transferred to various regular Gurkha battalions.

In contrast, the fourth battalion was formed in Palestine with three companies and two half-companies posted from Gurkha battalions serving in the 3rd (Lahore), 7th (Meerut), and British 75th Divisions. It remained in Palestine until the end of the war, before returning to India. It was disbanded in 1920 with personnel transferred to the other three battalions of the regiment.

The badge of the 11th Gurkha Rifles was crossed kukris, points upwards, cutting edge inwards, with "XI" above the intersection. The 11 Gorkha Rifles, formed by the Indian Army in 1948 after the Partition of India, uses the same badge. It does not claim any connection with the First World War regiment.

== Battalions ==
=== 1st Battalion ===
The 1st Battalion was formed at Kut-al-Amara on 18 May 1918 by the transfer of complete companies from:

- 1st Battalion, 5th Gurkha Rifles (Frontier Force)
- 2nd Battalion, 5th Gurkha Rifles (Frontier Force)
- 1st Battalion, 6th Gurkha Rifles
- 2nd Battalion, 6th Gurkha Rifles

In June 1918, the battalion arrived at Bombay Brigade, 6th Poona Divisional Area and in December was transferred to the 2nd (Nowshera) Brigade, 1st (Peshawar) Division. It served with the brigade and division in the Third Anglo-Afghan War in 1919.

The battalion was disbanded on 20 August 1921 at Abbottabad with the personnel transferring to 2nd Battalion, 5th Gurkha Rifles (Frontier Force).

=== 2nd Battalion ===
The 2nd Battalion was formed at Baghdad on 24 May 1918 by the transfer of complete companies from:

- 1st Battalion, 2nd King Edward's Own Gurkha Rifles (The Sirmoor Rifles)
- 1st Battalion, 3rd Queen Alexandra's Own Gurkha Rifles
- 2nd Battalion, 4th Gurkha Rifles
- 1st Battalion, 7th Gurkha Rifles

In June 1918, the battalion arrived at Bombay Brigade, 6th Poona Divisional Area and in December was transferred to the 2nd (Nowshera) Brigade, 1st (Peshawar) Division. It served with the brigade and division in the Third Anglo-Afghan War in 1919.

The battalion was disbanded on 15 August 1921 at Abbottabad with the personnel transferring to 2nd Battalion, 4th Gurkha Rifles and 1st Battalion, 7th Gurkha Rifles.

=== 3rd Battalion ===
The 3rd Battalion was formed at Baghdad on 25 May 1918 by the transfer of complete companies from:

- 1st Battalion, 39th Garhwal Rifles
- 2nd Battalion, 39th Garhwal Rifles
- 2nd Battalion, 9th Gurkha Rifles
- 1st Battalion, 10th Gurkha Rifles

In June 1918, the battalion arrived at Bombay Brigade, 6th Poona Divisional Area. In October, the Garhwal companies went to 4th Battalion, 39th Garhwal Rifles and were replaced by drafts from 1st Battalion, 7th Gurkha Rifles, 1st Battalion, 9th Gurkha Rifles and 2nd Battalion, 10th Gurkha Rifles In December, it was transferred to the Presidency Brigade, 8th (Lucknow) Division. It served with the 3rd Indian Brigade, 1st (Peshawar) Division in the Third Anglo-Afghan War in 1919.

The battalion was disbanded on 12 April 1922 at Abbottabad with the personnel transferring to 2nd Battalion, 5th Gurkha Rifles (Frontier Force), 1st Battalion, 7th Gurhka Rifles and 1st Battalion, 10th Gurkha Rifles.

=== 4th Battalion ===
The 4th Battalion was formed at Sarafand (now Tzrifin) on 24 May 1918 by the transfer of complete companies from:

- 1st Battalion, 1st King George's Own Gurkha Rifles (The Malaun Regiment)
- 2nd Battalion, 7th Gurkha Rifles
- 1st Battalion, 8th Gurkha Rifles

and half companies of

- 2nd Battalion, 3rd Queen Alexandra's Own Gurkha Rifles
- 3rd Battalion, 3rd Queen Alexandra's Own Gurkha Rifles

The battalion joined the 158th Brigade, 53rd (Welsh) Division on 4 June 1918 near Ram Allah. It remained with the division for the rest of the Sinai and Palestine Campaign, taking part in the Battle of Nablus (18–21 September 1918). At the end of the battle, the division was employed on salvage work and working on the Nablus road.

On 27 October, the division started moving to Alexandria even before the Armistice of Mudros came into effect on 31 October, thereby ending the war against the Ottoman Empire. It completed its concentration at Alexandria on 15 November. The division received demobilization instructions on 20 December 1918. The Indian infantry battalions returned to India as transports became available and the division was reduced to cadre by 7 June 1919. The battalion was disbanded on 1 August 1920 in India with the personnel transferring to 1st, 2nd and 3rd battalions of the regiment.

== See also ==
- Indian Army during World War I

== Bibliography ==
- Becke, Archibald F. (1936). Order of Battle of Divisions Part 2A. The Territorial Force Mounted Divisions and the 1st-Line Territorial Force Divisions (42–56). London: HMSO. OCLC 4405016.
- Becke, Archibald F. (1937). Order of Battle of Divisions Part 2B. The 2nd-Line Territorial Force Divisions (57th–69th) with The Home-Service Divisions (71st–73rd) and 74th and 75th Divisions. London: HMSO. OCLC 4405016.
- Becke, Archibald F. (1938). Order of Battle of Divisions Part 3A. New Army Divisions (9–26). London: HMSO. OCLC 4405016.
- Gaylor, John (1996). Sons of John Company: The Indian and Pakistan Armies 1903–1991 (2nd ed.). Tunbridge Wells: Parapress. ISBN 1-898594-41-4.
- Perry, F.W. (1993). Order of Battle of Divisions Part 5B. Indian Army Divisions. Newport: Ray Westlake Military Books. ISBN 1-871167-23-X.
