= 155th Pioneers =

- Active: May 1918 – 1920
- Country: British India
- Allegiance: British Crown
- Branch: British Indian Army
- Type: Pioneers
- Size: Two battalions
- Part of: 10th (Irish) Division; 53rd (Welsh) Division
- Engagements: First World War Sinai and Palestine Campaign Battle of Nablus

The 155th Pioneers was a pioneer regiment of the British Indian Army. It was formed in Mesopotamia and Palestine in May and June 1918, saw service in the Sinai and Palestine Campaign in the First World War, and was disbanded in 1920.

== Background ==
Heavy losses suffered by the British Expeditionary Force on the Western Front following the German spring offensive in March 1918 resulted in a major reorganization of the Egyptian Expeditionary Force:

- two divisions – 52nd (Lowland) and 74th (Yeomanry) – were transferred to France in April; they were replaced by the 3rd (Lahore) and 7th (Meerut) Divisions from Mesopotamia;
- nine yeomanry regiments were dismounted, converted to machine gunners and sent to France at the end of the same month; the 4th and 5th Cavalry Divisions were reformed with Indian cavalry regiments withdrawn from France and the 15th (Imperial Service) Cavalry Brigade already in Egypt;
- the 10th (Irish), 53rd (Welsh), 60th (2/2nd London), and 75th Divisions were reduced to a single British battalion per brigade. They were reformed with nine Indian infantry battalions and an Indian pioneer battalion each. (Note: The remaining infantry division in the Egyptian Expeditionary Force in March 1918 – the 54th (East Anglian) Division – remained unaffected by these changes.)

In fact, the 75th Division already had four Indian battalions assigned, (Note: In March 1917, the Egyptian Expeditionary Force started forming the 75th Division, originally to be made up of Territorial Force battalions arriving from India. In May 1917, to speed up the formation of the division, it was decided to incorporate Indian battalions. To this end, the independent 29th Indian Brigade was broken up in June 1917 and its battalions posted to 75th Division.) so of the 36 battalions needed to reform the divisions, 22 were improvised by taking whole companies from existing units already on active service in Mesopotamia and Palestine to form the 150th Infantry (3 battalions), 151st Sikh Infantry (3), 152nd Punjabis (3), 153rd Punjabis (3), 154th Infantry (3), 155th Pioneers (2), 156th Infantry (1) and the 11th Gurkha Rifles (4). The donor units were then brought back up to strength by drafts. In the event, just 13 of the battalions were assigned to the divisions and the remaining nine were transferred from Mesopotamia to India in June 1918.

== History ==
The 155th Pioneers was formed of two battalions in May and June 1918. The 1st Battalion was formed in Mesopotamia in May, by posting complete companies from battalions serving in that campaign, before transferring to Egypt in July. It joined the 2nd Battalion which was formed in Palestine in June with companies posted from battalions already serving in the theatre.

The battalions were assigned as pioneers to the two divisions of XX Corps, 53rd (Welsh) and 10th (Irish), respectively. Both battalions were detached to Watson's Force (Note: Commanded by Lt.-Col. G.B. Watson.) along with the 1/1st Worcestershire Yeomanry (XX Corps Cavalry Regiment) and a detachment from XX Corps Reinforcements Camp. The force occupied 5 miles of the line in the centre of the XX Corps front during the Battle of Nablus (19–21 September 1918).

=== Nomenclature ===
Perry shows each battalion with distinct designations: 1st Battalion, 155th Pioneers and 2nd Battalion, 155th Infantry despite the fact that the 2nd Battalion was formed from companies drawn from existing pioneer battalions and served successively as pioneers to the 60th (2/2nd London), 10th (Irish), and 53rd (Welsh) Divisions. Similarly, Gaylor designates the units as the 1st Battalion, 155th Indian Pioneers and 2nd Battalion, 155th Indian Infantry. It is notable that no other Indian infantry or pioneer regiment incorporated Indian in their titles at this time. (Note: Later, two regiments incorporated Indian in their titles: the 4th Bombay Grenadiers (formed on 1 March 1922) was designated as The Indian Grenadiers from October 1945 before being assigned to the Indian Army on Partition and being redesignated as The Grenadiers; and the Indian Parachute Regiment had a brief existence from 1 March 1945 to 26 October 1946 before being reformed on 15 April 1952 as the Parachute Regiment.)

Becke uses a severely abbreviated notation for unit names in his tables: 2/155 (P.) for 10th (Irish) Division and 155th (P.) for 53rd (Welsh) Division but is more explicit in his General Notes for the 60th (2/2nd London) Division where he names 2/155 Pioneers.

=== 1st Battalion ===
The 1st Battalion was formed in Mesopotamia in May 1918 by the transfer of complete companies from:

- 34th Sikh Pioneers
- 48th Pioneers
- 64th Pioneers
- 128th Pioneers

The battalion was made up of two companies of Mazhabi Sikhs, one company of Jats and one company of Rajput Muslims.

The battalion disembarked at Suez on 11 July and moved to Qantara. It reached Lydda on 6 August and joined the 53rd (Welsh) Division on 12 August 1918 near Ram Allah. It remained with the division for the rest of the Sinai and Palestine Campaign, taking part in the Battle of Nablus (18–21 September 1918).

On 27 October, the 53rd (Welsh) Division started moving to Alexandria even before the Armistice of Mudros came into effect on 31 October, thereby ending the war against the Ottoman Empire. It completed its concentration at Alexandria on 15 November. The division received demobilization instructions on 20 December 1918. The Indian infantry battalions returned to India as transports became available and the division was reduced to cadre by 7 June 1919. The battalion was disbanded in 1920.

=== 2nd Battalion ===
The 2nd Battalion was formed in Palestine on 12 and 13 June 1918 by the transfer of the following complete companies:

- W Company, 1st Battalion, 23rd Sikh Pioneers
- A Company, 2nd Battalion, 23rd Sikh Pioneers
- C Company, 2nd Battalion, 32nd Sikh Pioneers
- A Company, 121st Pioneers

The battalion was made up of three companies of Mazhabi Sikhs and one company of Yusafzais.

The battalion served as pioneers with the 60th (2/2nd London) Division from 18 June to 19 July before joining the 10th (Irish) Division as its pioneer battalion. On 31 August, it was detached to the 53rd (Welsh) Division until after the breakthrough as a result of the Battles of Megiddo (19–25 September). It rejoined the 10th (Irish) Division and in October was employed on the Damascus Road near Tiberias.

The 10th (Irish) Division concentrated near Tul Karm in the middle of October and was there when the Armistice of Mudros came into effect. The division moved to Sarafand (now Tzrifin) by 12 November and moved back to Egypt, concentrating in Cairo by 1 December. It was there when demobilization began in January 1919. The battalion was disbanded in 1920.

== See also ==
- Indian Army during World War I

== Bibliography ==
- Becke, Archibald F. (1936). Order of Battle of Divisions Part 2A. The Territorial Force Mounted Divisions and the 1st-Line Territorial Force Divisions (42–56). London: HMSO. OCLC 4405016.
- Becke, Archibald F. (1937). Order of Battle of Divisions Part 2B. The 2nd-Line Territorial Force Divisions (57th–69th) with The Home-Service Divisions (71st–73rd) and 74th and 75th Divisions. London: HMSO. OCLC 4405016.
- Becke, Archibald F. (1938). Order of Battle of Divisions Part 3A. New Army Divisions (9–26). London: HMSO. OCLC 4405016.
- Becke, Archibald F. (1945). Order of Battle of Divisions Part 4. The Army Council, G.H.Q.s, Armies and Corps, 1914-1919. London: HMSO. OCLC 4405016.
- Gaylor, John (1996). Sons of John Company: The Indian and Pakistan Armies 1903–1991 (2nd ed.). Tunbridge Wells: Parapress. ISBN 1-898594-41-4.
- Perry, F.W. (1993). Order of Battle of Divisions Part 5B. Indian Army Divisions. Newport: Ray Westlake Military Books. ISBN 1-871167-23-X.
