= 151st Sikh Infantry =

151st Sikh Infantry / 151st Punjabi Rifles
- Active: May 1918 – 15 May 1921
- Country: British India
- Allegiance: British Crown
- Branch: British Indian Army
- Type: Infantry
- Size: Three battalions
- Part of: Kohat Brigade; 10th (Irish) Division; 60th (2/2nd London) Division
- Engagements: First World War Sinai and Palestine Campaign Battle of Nablus Battle of Sharon Third Anglo-Afghan War

The 151st Sikh Infantry – also designated 151st Punjabi Rifles, see nomenclature (below) – was an infantry regiment of the British Indian Army. It was formed in Mesopotamia and Palestine in May 1918, saw active service in the First World War and the Third Anglo-Afghan War, and was disbanded in May 1921.

== Background ==
Heavy losses suffered by the British Expeditionary Force on the Western Front following the German spring offensive in March 1918 resulted in a major reorganization of the Egyptian Expeditionary Force:

- two divisions – 52nd (Lowland) and 74th (Yeomanry) – were transferred to France in April; they were replaced by the 3rd (Lahore) and 7th (Meerut) Divisions from Mesopotamia;
- nine yeomanry regiments were dismounted, converted to machine gunners and sent to France at the end of the same month; the 4th and 5th Cavalry Divisions were reformed with Indian cavalry regiments withdrawn from France and the 15th (Imperial Service) Cavalry Brigade already in Egypt;
- the 10th (Irish), 53rd (Welsh), 60th (2/2nd London), and 75th Divisions were reduced to a single British battalion per brigade. They were reformed with nine Indian infantry battalions and an Indian pioneer battalion each. (Note: The remaining infantry division in the Egyptian Expeditionary Force in March 1918 – the 54th (East Anglian) Division – remained unaffected by these changes.)

In fact, the 75th Division already had four Indian battalions assigned, (Note: In March 1917, the Egyptian Expeditionary Force started forming the 75th Division, originally to be made up of Territorial Force battalions arriving from India. In May 1917, to speed up the formation of the division, it was decided to incorporate Indian battalions. To this end, the independent 29th Indian Brigade was broken up in June 1917 and its battalions posted to 75th Division.) so of the 36 battalions needed to reform the divisions, 22 were improvised by taking whole companies from existing units already on active service in Mesopotamia and Palestine to form the 150th Infantry (3 battalions), 151st Sikh Infantry (3), 152nd Punjabis (3), 153rd Punjabis (3), 154th Infantry (3), 155th Pioneers (2), 156th Infantry (1) and the 11th Gurkha Rifles (4). The donor units were then brought back up to strength by drafts. In the event, just 13 of the battalions were assigned to the divisions and the remaining nine were transferred from Mesopotamia to India in June 1918.

== History ==
=== Nomenclature ===
Oddly, the designation of the regiment varied between the battalions. The 1st and 2nd Battalions were 151st Sikh Infantry whereas the 3rd Battalion was 151st Punjabi Rifles, hence 1st Battalion, 151st Sikh Infantry, 2nd Battalion, 151st Sikh Infantry and 3rd Battalion, 151st Punjabi Rifles. Gaylor states that the 2nd Battalion was 151st Indian Infantry; it is notable that no other Indian infantry regiment incorporated Indian in their titles at this time. (Note: Later, two regiments incorporated Indian in their titles: the 4th Bombay Grenadiers (formed on 1 March 1922) was designated as The Indian Grenadiers from October 1945 before being assigned to the Indian Army on Partition and being redesignated as The Grenadiers; and the Indian Parachute Regiment had a brief existence from 1 March 1945 to 26 October 1946 before being reformed on 15 April 1952 as the Parachute Regiment.) Other sources designate both the 2nd and 3rd battalions as 151st Infantry.

=== Formation ===
The 151st Sikh Infantry / 151st Punjabi Rifles was formed of three battalions in May 1918. The 1st Battalion was formed in Mesopotamia with companies posted from battalions serving in the 17th and 18th Indian Divisions. It was transferred to India in June 1918 and later took part in the Third Anglo-Afghan War in 1919 as part of the Kohat Brigade.

In contrast, the 2nd and 3rd Battalions were formed in Palestine with companies posted from battalions serving in the theatre particularly from the 3rd (Lahore) and 7th (Meerut) Divisions. They were assigned to British divisions and took part in the final Allied offensive of the Sinai and Palestine Campaign (the Battles of Megiddo).

=== 1st Battalion ===
The 1st Battalion was formed in Mesopotamia in May 1918 by the transfer of complete companies from:

- 14th King George's Own Ferozepore Sikhs
- 36th Sikhs
- 45th Rattray's Sikhs
- 52nd Sikhs (Frontier Force)

The battalion was transferred from Mesopotamia to India in June 1918 and joined the Allahabad Brigade in the 8th (Lucknow) Division where it remained in until the end of the First World War. In May 1919, it mobilized with the Kohat Brigade and took part in the Third Anglo-Afghan War. The battalion was disbanded on 15 May 1921.

=== 2nd Battalion ===
The 2nd Battalion was formed near Jaffa on 30 May 1918 by the transfer of complete companies from:

- 51st Sikhs (Frontier Force)
- 53rd Sikhs (Frontier Force)
- 54th Sikhs (Frontier Force)
- 56th Punjabi Rifles (Frontier Force)

On 10 June, the battalion joined the 29th Brigade, 10th (Irish) Division and remained with the division for the rest of the Sinai and Palestine Campaign, taking part in the Battle of Nablus (19–21 September 1918).

The 10th (Irish) Division concentrated near Tul Karm in the middle of October and was there when the Armistice of Mudros came into effect at noon on 31 October. The division moved to Sarafand (now Tzrifin) by 12 November and moved back to Egypt, concentrating in Cairo by 1 December. It was there when demobilization began in January 1919. The battalion was disbanded on 31 July 1920.

=== 3rd Battalion ===
The 3rd Battalion was formed at Latrun and 'Ain 'Ariq between 24 May and 27 June 1918 by the transfer of complete companies from:

- 1st Battalion, Guides Infantry
- 38th Dogras
- 58th Vaughan's Rifles (Frontier Force)
- 59th Scinde Rifles (Frontier Force)

The battalion joined the 179th Brigade, 60th (2/2nd London) Division at 'Ain 'Ariq on 4 June. It remained with the division for the rest of the Sinai and Palestine Campaign, taking part in the Battle of Sharon (19–21 September 1918).

After the Armistice of Mudros, the 60th Division was withdrawn to Alexandria by 26 November 1918 where demobilization gradually took place. Three Indian battalions returned to India in February 1919 and the last had departed by 31 May 1919. The battalion was disbanded on 15 May 1921.

== See also ==
- Indian Army during World War I

== Bibliography ==
- Becke, Archibald F. (1936). Order of Battle of Divisions Part 2A. The Territorial Force Mounted Divisions and the 1st-Line Territorial Force Divisions (42–56). London: HMSO. OCLC 4405016.
- Becke, Archibald F. (1937). Order of Battle of Divisions Part 2B. The 2nd-Line Territorial Force Divisions (57th–69th) with The Home-Service Divisions (71st–73rd) and 74th and 75th Divisions. London: HMSO. OCLC 4405016.
- Becke, Archibald F. (1938). Order of Battle of Divisions Part 3A. New Army Divisions (9–26). London: HMSO. OCLC 4405016.
- Gaylor, John (1996). Sons of John Company: The Indian and Pakistan Armies 1903–1991 (2nd ed.). Tunbridge Wells: Parapress. ISBN 1-898594-41-4.
- Perry, F.W. (1993). Order of Battle of Divisions Part 5B. Indian Army Divisions. Newport: Ray Westlake Military Books. ISBN 1-871167-23-X.
