= 152nd Punjabis =

- Active: 16 May 1918 – 4 September 1921
- Country: British India
- Allegiance: British Crown
- Branch: British Indian Army
- Type: Infantry
- Size: Three battalions
- Part of: 53rd (Welsh) Division; 60th (2/2nd London) Division; 75th Division
- Engagements: First World War Sinai and Palestine Campaign Battle of Nablus Battle of Sharon

The 152nd Punjabis was an infantry regiment of the British Indian Army. It was formed in Mesopotamia and Palestine in May 1918, saw service in the Sinai and Palestine Campaign in the First World War, and was disbanded in September 1921.

== History ==
=== Background ===
Heavy losses suffered by the British Expeditionary Force on the Western Front following the German spring offensive in March 1918 resulted in a major reorganization of the Egyptian Expeditionary Force:

- two divisions – 52nd (Lowland) and 74th (Yeomanry) – were transferred to France in April; they were replaced by the 3rd (Lahore) and 7th (Meerut) Divisions from Mesopotamia;
- nine yeomanry regiments were dismounted, converted to machine gunners and sent to France at the end of the same month; the 4th and 5th Cavalry Divisions were reformed with Indian cavalry regiments withdrawn from France and the 15th (Imperial Service) Cavalry Brigade already in Egypt;
- the 10th (Irish), 53rd (Welsh), 60th (2/2nd London), and 75th Divisions were reduced to a single British battalion per brigade. They were reformed with nine Indian infantry battalions and an Indian pioneer battalion each. (Note: The remaining infantry division in the Egyptian Expeditionary Force in March 1918 – the 54th (East Anglian) Division – remained unaffected by these changes.)

In fact, the 75th Division already had four Indian battalions assigned, (Note: In March 1917, the Egyptian Expeditionary Force started forming the 75th Division, originally to be made up of Territorial Force battalions arriving from India. In May 1917, to speed up the formation of the division, it was decided to incorporate Indian battalions. To this end, the independent 29th Indian Brigade was broken up in June 1917 and its battalions posted to 75th Division.) so of the 36 battalions needed to reform the divisions, 22 were improvised by taking whole companies from existing units already on active service in Mesopotamia and Palestine to form the 150th Infantry (3 battalions), 151st Sikh Infantry (3), 152nd Punjabis (3), 153rd Punjabis (3), 154th Infantry (3), 155th Pioneers (2), 156th Infantry (1) and the 11th Gurkha Rifles (4). The donor units were then brought back up to strength by drafts. In the event, just 13 of the battalions were assigned to the divisions and the remaining nine were transferred from Mesopotamia to India in June 1918.

=== Formation ===
The 152nd Punjabis was formed of three battalions in May 1918. The first two were formed in Mesopotamia with companies posted from battalions serving in the 14th, 15th, 17th, and 18th Indian Divisions. They were transferred to Egypt in June 1918. In contrast, the 3rd Battalion was formed in Palestine with companies posted from battalions already serving in the theatre. All three battalions were assigned to British divisions and took part in the final Allied offensive of the Sinai and Palestine Campaign (the Battles of Megiddo).

== Battalions ==
=== 1st Battalion ===
The 1st Battalion was formed at Amara on 24 May 1918 by the transfer of complete companies from: (Note: Perry says that the 4th company of the 1st Battalion was formed from half companies of the 29th and 31st Punjabis. However, the 29th Punjabis departed Karachi on 26 March, arrived Suez on 5 April and joined 233rd Brigade, 75th Division on 28 April, so this seems unlikely.)

- 24th Punjabis
- 25th Punjabis
- 26th Punjabis
- 31st Punjabis

It moved to Basra on 29 May where it embarked on 22 June for Egypt. It arrived at Suez on 11 July and moved to Qantara. It entrained on 17 July and arrived at Lydda the next day. It joined the 234th Brigade, 75th Division at Rantis on 26 July. It remained with the division for the rest of the Sinai and Palestine Campaign, taking part in the Battle of Sharon (19 September 1918). The division was then withdrawn into XXI Corps Reserve near Et Tire where it was employed on salvage work and road making. On 22 October it moved to Haifa where it was when the Armistice of Mudros came into effect and the war ended.

On 13 November, the 75th Division concentrated at Lydda and by 10 December had moved back to Qantara. On 18 January 1919, instructions were received that the Indian battalions would be returned to India as transport became available. The battalion was disbanded in 1920.

=== 2nd Battalion ===
The 2nd Battalion was formed at Hinaidi near Baghdad between 16 and 19 May 1918 by the transfer of complete companies from:

- 37th Dogras
- 62nd Punjabis
- 67th Punjabis
- 84th Punjabis

It moved to Nahr Umar (near Basra) on 19 May where it embarked on 2 June for Egypt, disembarking at Suez on 23 June. It joined the 181st Brigade, 60th (2/2nd London) Division beyond Beit Nuba on 30 June. It remained with the division for the rest of the Sinai and Palestine Campaign, taking part in the Battle of Sharon (19–21 September 1918).

After the Armistice of Mudros, the 60th Division was withdrawn to Alexandria by 26 November 1918 where demobilization gradually took place. Three Indian battalions returned to India in February 1919 and the last had departed by 31 May 1919. The battalion was disbanded on 4 September 1921.

=== 3rd Battalion ===
The 3rd Battalion was formed at Sarafand (now Tzrifin) on 24 May 1918 by the transfer of complete companies from:

- 20th Duke of Cambridge's Own Infantry (Brownlow's Punjabis)
- 21st Punjabis
- 27th Punjabis
- 28th Punjabis

The battalion joined the 159th Brigade, 53rd (Welsh) Division on 4 June 1918 near Ramallah. It remained with the division for the rest of the Sinai and Palestine Campaign, taking part in the Battle of Nablus (18–21 September 1918). At the end of the battle, the division was employed on salvage work and working on the Nablus road.

On 27 October, the division started moving to Alexandria even before the Armistice of Mudros came into effect on 31 October, thereby ending the war against the Ottoman Empire. It completed its concentration at Alexandria on 15 November. The division received demobilization instructions on 20 December 1918. The Indian infantry battalions returned to India as transports became available and 159th Brigade was reduced to cadre by 7 March 1919. The battalion was disbanded on 30 April 1921.

== See also ==
- Indian Army during World War I

== Bibliography ==
- Becke, Archibald F. (1936). Order of Battle of Divisions Part 2A. The Territorial Force Mounted Divisions and the 1st-Line Territorial Force Divisions (42–56). London: HMSO. OCLC 4405016.
- Becke, Archibald F. (1937). Order of Battle of Divisions Part 2B. The 2nd-Line Territorial Force Divisions (57th–69th) with The Home-Service Divisions (71st–73rd) and 74th and 75th Divisions. London: HMSO. OCLC 4405016.
- Becke, Archibald F. (1938). Order of Battle of Divisions Part 3A. New Army Divisions (9–26). London: HMSO. OCLC 4405016.
- Gaylor, John (1996). Sons of John Company: The Indian and Pakistan Armies 1903–1991 (2nd ed.). Tunbridge Wells: Parapress. ISBN 1-898594-41-4.
- Perry, F.W. (1993). Order of Battle of Divisions Part 5B. Indian Army Divisions. Newport: Ray Westlake Military Books. ISBN 1-871167-23-X.
