= 234th Infantry Brigade =

Military unit

The 234th Infantry Brigade was an infantry brigade of the British Army, raised during the First World War, and was later reformed during the Second World War.

== First World War ==
The 234th Brigade was assigned to the 75th Division and served in the Sinai and Palestine Campaign.

- 2nd Battalion, Loyal North Lancashire Regiment
- 1/4th Battalion, Duke of Cornwall's Light Infantry
- 123rd Outram's Rifles
- 58th Vaughan's Rifles (Frontier Force)
- 2/4th Battalion, Dorsetshire Regiment
- 2/4th Battalion, Devonshire Regiment
- 1st Battalion, 152nd Punjabis
- 231st Machine Gun Company, Machine Gun Corps
- 234th Trench Mortar Battery

=== Commanders ===
The following officers commanded the brigade during the war:

- Brigadier-General F. G. Anley (26 June – 19 November 1917)
- Brigadier-General C. A. H. Maclean (19 November 1917 – 8 April 1918)
  - Acting: Lieutenant-Colonel G. R. Cassels (8–23 April 1918)
- Brigadier-General C. A. H. Maclean (23–25 April 1918)
  - Acting: Lieutenant-Colonel G. R. Cassels (25 April – 7 May 1918)
- Brigadier-General C. A. H. Maclean (7 May – 12 July 1918)
  - Acting: Lieutenant-Colonel G. E. S. Smith (12–17 July 1918)
  - Acting: Lieutenant-Colonel J. N. Macrae (17–21 July 1918)
  - Acting: Lieutenant-Colonel G. R. Cassels (21 July – 16 August 1918)
- Brigadier-General C. A. H. Maclean (16 August – 2 October 1918)
  - Acting: Lieutenant-Colonel G. R. Cassels (2–3 October 1918)
- Brigadier-General F. P. C. Keily (3 October 1918)

== Second World War ==
The brigade was re-formed as the 234th Infantry Brigade during the Second World War on 1 April 1943 from the redesignation of the 4th (Malta) Infantry Brigade, which before that was known as the Western Infantry Brigade, which had garrisoned the island during its siege by air and sea by the Axis powers from June 1940 until November 1942. The unit was formed as the main British military force for the Dodecanese Campaign to capture the Dodecanese Islands in late 1943 and consisted mainly of regular army units of the British Army that had served on the island during the siege.

The brigade, under Major-General F. G. R. Brittorous, later replaced by Brigadier Robert Tilney, was landed on the island of Leros towards the end of September 1943. The 234th Brigade, together with other British, Italian and Allied forces, attempted to hold the Dodecanese islands against successive German air attacks and the landings of amphibious German forces, but without success. In the Battle of Kos and the Battle of Leros, German air superiority and tactical ability resulted in British defeats, and their garrisons were forced to surrender after a few days' resistance. The few men of the brigade who had escaped returned to the Middle East, where it was disbanded on 16 January 1944.

=== Order of battle ===
The brigade was constituted as follows during the war:

- 4th Battalion, Buffs (Royal East Kent Regiment) (from 13 May 1942 until 10 April 1943, rejoined 26 October 1943, captured 16 November 1943)
- 8th Battalion, King's Own Royal Regiment (Lancaster) (from 13 May 1942 until 7 January 1943)
- 1st Battalion, Durham Light Infantry (from 14 May 1942 until 9 September 1943)
- 1st Battalion, Cheshire Regiment (from 23 January 1943 until 5 April 1943)
- 1st Battalion, The King's Own Malta Regiment (from 29 March 1943 until 10 October June 1943)
- 2nd Battalion, Royal Irish Fusiliers (6 April 1943, captured 16 November 1943)
- 2nd Battalion, Queen's Own Royal West Kent Regiment (from 11 April 1943, captured 16 November 1943)
- 1st Battalion, King's Own Royal Regiment (Lancaster) (from 24 October 1943, captured 16 November 1943)

=== Commanders ===
The following officers commanded the brigade during the war:

- Brigadier F.G.R. Brittorous (from 13 May 1942 until 5 November 1943)
- Brigadier R. Tilney (from 5 November 1943)
