= 123rd Outram's Rifles =

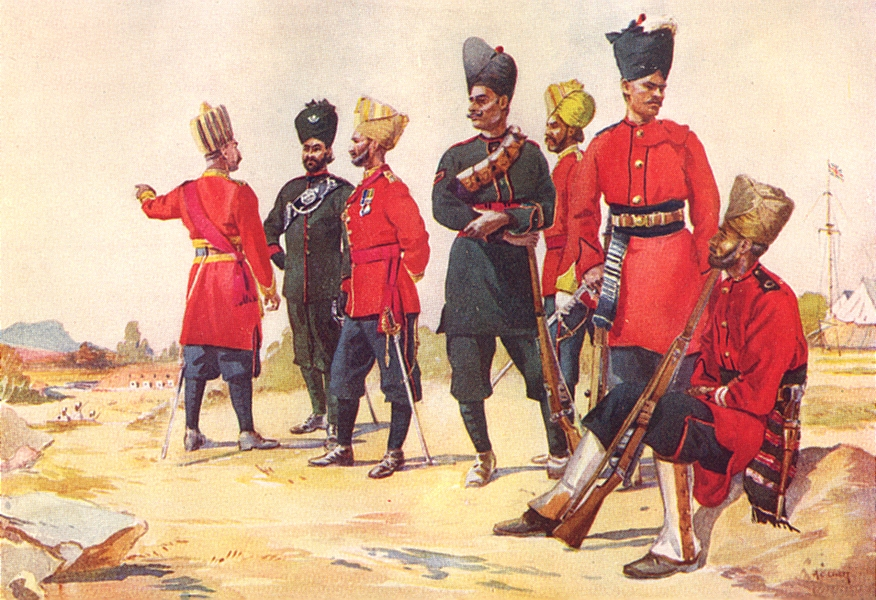
- A depiction of a Lance Naik of the 123rd Outram's Rifles (fourth from right) amongst other British Indian Army troops.
- Active: 1820–1922
- Country: Indian Empire
- Branch: Army
- Type: Infantry
- Part of: Bombay Army (to 1895); Bombay Command
- Colors: Red; faced dark green, 1882 emerald green
- Engagements: Third Anglo-Maratha War; Anglo-Persian War; Second Afghan War; Second Burmese War

The 123rd Outram's Rifles was an infantry regiment of the British Indian Army.

== History ==
It traced its origins to the 12th Regiment of Bombay Native Infantry, part of the British East India Company's Bombay Army. It fought in the Battle of Khadki on 5 November 1817 in the Third Anglo-Maratha War and became the regiment's 1st Battalion in 1820. It was made a separate regiment in 1824, titled the 23rd Regiment of Bombay Native Infantry.

The regiment took part in the First Anglo-Afghan War in 1839 and was renamed as the 23rd Regiment of Bombay Native Light Infantry in 1841 . Just before the Indian Mutiny began in 1857, the 23rd took part in the Anglo-Persian War between 1856-1857. During the Indian Mutiny, the regiment remained loyal, like nearly all of the Bombay Army.

The regiment took part in the Second Anglo-Afghan War from 1879 and the Third Anglo-Burmese War from 1885 to the end of the war in 1887. It dropped "native" from its title in 1885 and was designated a rifle regiment in 1889, to become the 23rd Regiment (2nd Rifle Regiment) of Bombay Infantry.

The 1900s also brought change to its title. The regiment became the 23rd Bombay Rifles in 1901, but only two years later it became the 123rd Outram's Rifles in 1903 as part of the Kitchener reforms of the Indian Army. The renaming was in honour of Lieutenant-General Sir James Outram who had served with the regiment as its first adjutant. In the early 1900s the regiment saw service against Diiriye Guure and his followers in British Somaliland, where it was transferred in late 1902, while a company was sent to Aden in 1903.

=== First World War ===
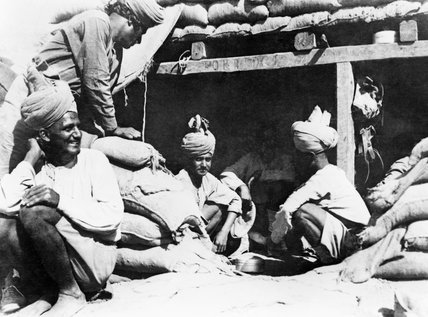
Sepoys of the 123rd during the campaign in Palestine, 1917

The regiment raised further battalions during the course of the First World War, seeing extensive service in the Middle East, with some soldiers attached to other units. Many of the regiment's soldiers also saw service on the Western Front while attached to other units.

After the Palestine campaign began in 1917, the regiment joined the 234th Brigade, 75th Division. Outram's Rifles were involved in, among others, the Third Battle of Gaza, begun on 31 October 1917, and the Megiddo Offensive in September 1918. War came to an end in the Middle East with the signing of an Armistice with the Ottomans on 30 October 1918.

=== Post-War ===
After the war ended, the regiment was involved in efforts to quell an Arab rebellion that broke out in 1920 in the British Mandate of Iraq against the British administration. As part of the reforms of the Indian forces, Outram's Rifles were amalgamated in 1922 with five other regiments, including the 125th Napier's Rifles, to form the 6th Rajputana Rifles. The 123rd became the 4th Battalion (Outram's).

The 4th Battalion/6th Rajputana Rifles had the distinction of earning two Victoria Crosses during WWII.

== Notable soldiers of the battalion ==
- Chhelu Ram
- Richhpal Ram

== Battle honours ==
- Kirkee, Persia, Afghanistan 1879-80, Burma 1885-87
