= Volunteer Street drill hall, Chester =

Former drill hall in Chester, England

- Chester, Cheshire
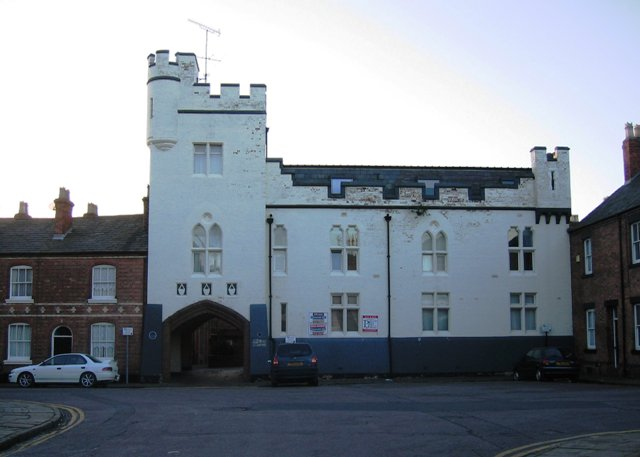
- Volunteer Street drill hall, Chester

Site information
- Type: Drill hall

Location
- Location in Cheshire
- Coordinates: 53.18823°N 2.88818°W

Site history
- Built: 1868
- Built for: War Office
- In use: 1868 – 1921

The Volunteer Street drill hall is a former military installation at the corner of Albion Street and Volunteer Street in Chester, Cheshire. The building is designated by Historic England as a Grade II listed building.

== History ==
The building was designed by James Harrison as the headquarters of the 6th Cheshire Rifle Volunteers who relocated from the cockpit outside Newgate in 1868. The drill hall was also used by elements of the Royal Garrison Artillery. The 6th Cheshire Rifle Volunteers evolved to become the 2nd Earl of Chester's Volunteer Battalion, The Cheshire Regiment in 1883 and the 5th (Earl of Chester's) Battalion, The Cheshire Regiment in 1908. The battalion was mobilised at the drill hall in August 1914 before being deployed to the Western Front. The battalion amalgamated with the 4th Battalion to form the 4th/5th (Earl of Chester's) Battalion at the Grange Road West drill hall in Birkenhead in 1921. The Volunteer Street drill hall itself, being surplus to requirements, was demolished in 1983 but the facade was retained to create the frontage for some residential apartments in a building which is now known as Albion Mews.
