= 158th Infantry Brigade (United Kingdom) =

North Wales Brigade 158th (North Wales) Brigade 158th Infantry Brigade
- Active: 1908–1919; 1920-1946; 1947-1968
- Country: United Kingdom
- Branch: Territorial Army
- Type: Infantry
- Size: Brigade
- Part of: 53rd (Welsh) Infantry Division
- Engagements: First World War: Gallipoli Campaign; First Battle of Gaza; Second Battle of Gaza; Third Battle of Gaza; Second World War: Battle of Normandy; Battle of Falaise; Battle of the Bulge; Battle of the Reichswald

Commanders
- Officer Commanding: Brigadier S.O. Jones

The 158th Infantry Brigade was an infantry brigade of the British Army that served in both the First and Second World Wars, before being disbanded in 1968. Throughout its existence the brigade was assigned to the 53rd (Welsh) Infantry Division and was composed almost entirely of Territorial battalions from the Royal Welch Fusiliers.

== Formation ==
The North Wales Brigade (as it was originally known) was created in 1908 under the Haldane Reforms when the Volunteer Force and the Yeomanry were merged to create the Territorial Force and was composed of the 4th (Denbighshire), 5th (Flintshire), 6th (Carnarvonfonshire and Anglesey) and 7th (Merioneth and Montgomery) Volunteer battalions of the Royal Welsh Fusiliers. The brigade was assigned to the Welsh Division, one of fourteen divisions of the peacetime Territorial Force. As the name suggests, the brigade recruited primarily from North Wales.

== First World War ==
The Welsh Division was mobilised on 5 August 1914, the day after Britain declared war on Germany, which officially began the First World War. According to the Territorial and Reserve Forces Act 1907 soldiers of the Territorial Force were only able to serve overseas with their permission and so, when asked, a large majority of the men volunteered for overseas service.

Throughout 1915 all divisions of the Territorial Force were given numbers and so, on 13 May 1915, the division was numbered as the 53rd (Welsh) Division and all the brigades of the division were also numbered, the North Wales Brigade becoming the 158th (1/1st North Wales) Brigade. The battalions were also redesignated, becoming, for example, '1/5th RWF', to distinguish them from their 2nd Line duplicates which were currently being formed in 203rd (2/1st North Wales) Brigade, of the 68th (2nd Welsh) Division, which consisted mainly of the men who, when asked at the outbreak of the war, did not wish to serve overseas, together with the many recruits and thousands of men volunteering.

The brigade fought with the 53rd (Welsh) Division throughout the First World War in the Middle Eastern theatre from mid-1915 until the end of the war in 1918. In its first action the brigade was involved in the disastrous Gallipoli Campaign where it landed in August 1915. After temporarily serving under command of the 2nd Mounted Division, between 31 October and 28 November, the brigade, together with the rest of 53rd Division, was evacuated form Gallipoli to Egypt in December 1915 and continued serving in the Middle Eastern theatre in Sinai and Palestine. The brigade took part in the Battle of Romani in August 1916, the Battle of El Buggar Ridge in October 1917 and the action of Tell 'Asur in March 1918, where it fought off several counter-attacks by the Ottoman forces.

Throughout mid-1918, most of the British battalions of the brigade were posted to reinforce the British Expeditionary Force (BEF) serving in the trenches of the Western Front, after the German Army launched its huge Spring Offensive, which saw huge territorial gains for the Germans. As a result, the British battalions were replaced by Indian Army battalions. This occurred in most British divisions serving in the Middle East.

=== Order of Battle ===
The brigade commanded the following units in the First World War:

- 1/4th (Denbighshire) Battalion, Royal Welch Fusiliers (left on 6 November 1914 for 3rd Brigade, 1st Division on the Western Front)
- 1/5th (Flintshire) Battalion, Royal Welsh Fusiliers (until 2 August 1918) (Note: 1/5th and 1/6th battalions of the Royal Welch Fusiliers were amalgamated on 3 August 1918 as the 5th/6th Battalion, Royal Welch Fusiliers.)
- 1/6th (Carnarvonshire and Anglesey) Battalion, Royal Welsh Fusiliers (until 2 August 1918)
- 1/7th (Merionethshire & Montgomeryshire) Battalion, Royal Welsh Fusiliers (left 24 June 1918 for 160th (Welsh Border) Brigade)
- 1/1st Battalion, Herefordshire Regiment (joined on 24 April 1915 from 160th (Welsh Border) Brigade, left 1 June 1918 for 102nd Brigade, 34th Division on the Western Front)
- 5th/6th Battalion, Royal Welch Fusiliers (from 3 August 1918)
- 158th Machine Gun Company, Machine Gun Corps (formed 26 April 1916, moved to 53rd Battalion, Machine Gun Corps 25 April 1918)
- 158th Trench Mortar Battery (formed 22 July 1917)
- 4th Battalion, 11th Gurkha Rifles (newly formed on 25 April 1918 and joined on 4 June 1918)
- 3rd Battalion, 153rd Rifles (newly formed on 25 April 1918 and joined on 10 June 1918)
- 3rd Battalion, 154th Infantry (joined from Mesopotamia on 3 August 1918)

== Inter-war period ==
The division and brigade, along with the rest of the Territorial Force, was disbanded after the war but started to reform in 1920, and was later renamed the Territorial Army. The division was reformed as the 53rd (Welsh) Infantry Division and the brigade was itself reformed and renamed as the 158th (Royal Welch) Infantry Brigade, with its headquarters at Wrexham. The brigade again consisted of four battalions of the Royal Welch Fusiliers and this remained the order of battle of the brigade for most of the inter-war period.

In 1938 a reorganisation of the Territorial Army's infantry divisions saw them reduced from twelve to nine infantry battalions. As a direct consequence of this, the 5th (Flintshire) Battalion, Royal Welch Fusiliers was chosen to be converted into another role, being transferred to the Royal Artillery and converted and redesignated to become the 60th (Royal Welch Fusiliers) Anti-Tank Regiment, Royal Artillery and acted as the anti-tank regiment for the 53rd Division until December 1939, when it transferred to the 1st Armoured Division.

== Second World War ==
The Territorial Army, and 53rd Division, was mobilised in late August/early September 1939, due to the situation in Europe becoming increasingly worse. The German Army invaded Poland on 1 September 1939 and Britain and France declared war on Germany two days later, officially beginning the Second World War. Over a month later, in October the brigade, as in the First World War consisted of three battalions of the Royal Welch Fusiliers, the 4th, 6th and 7th. The 158th Brigade the first element of the 53rd Division to be sent to Northern Ireland, followed in December by the 160th Brigade and later 159th Brigade in April 1940. The brigade would remain there until November 1941, training hard with the rest of the division.

After the British Expeditionary Force (BEF) was evacuated from Dunkirk in late May/early June, the brigade, with the division, moved to Ulster to counter a possible German invasion there and the garrison was strengthened by the arrival of the 61st Infantry Division and, in March 1941, the 5th Infantry Division, a Regular Army formation that had seen service in France with the BEF in 1940.

In November 1941 the division was sent back to the mainland again, briefly serving in Wales before transferring to Kent, coming under command of XII Corps and training alongside 43rd (Wessex) and 46th Infantry Divisions. At the time the corps was commanded by Lieutenant-General Bernard Montgomery.

53rd (Welsh) Division spent the next few years training for the planned Allied invasion of Normandy (Operation Overlord). The intensity of training was stepped up in 1944. Early in the year the division was involved in two corps-level exercises. In March divisional HQ and the brigade and ancillary HQs took part in 'Exercise Shudder' to study 'thrust line' technique, then in April the whole division was engaged in 'Exercise Henry' on the South Downs training area; this included a river crossing and full-scale simulated attack. In May 'Exercise Bud' practised loading vehicles onto landing craft. Finally, in the last week of May, the brigade began moving into its concentration area ready for the invasion.

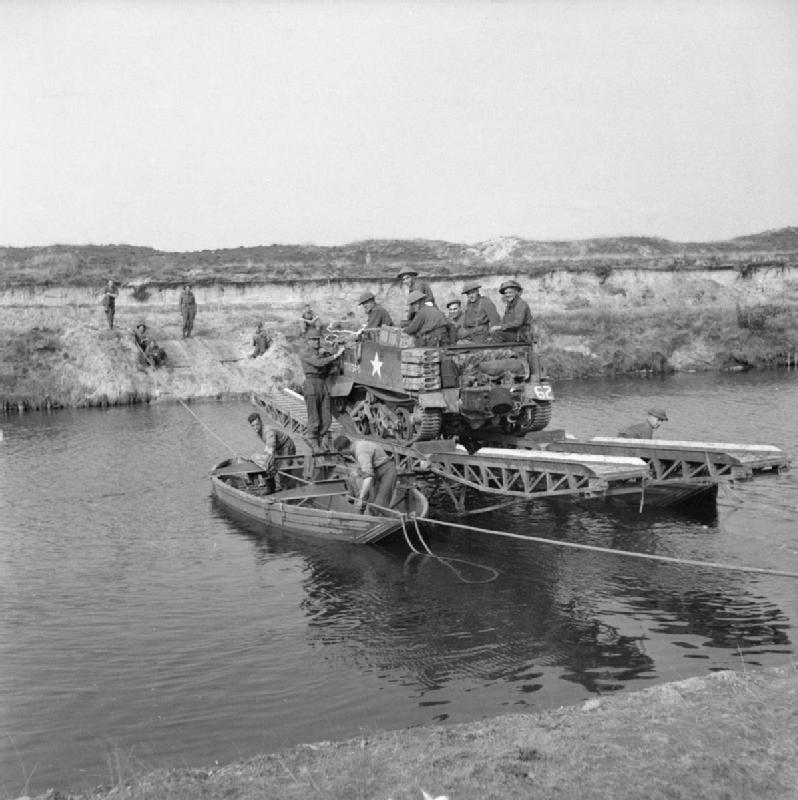
A Universal Carrier of the 1st Battalion, East Lancashire Regiment being pulled across the Meuse-Escaut (Maas-Schelde) canal on a raft, near Lommel, 19 September 1944.

The brigade landed in Normandy on 23 June 1944 and fought in the campaign in North West Europe until May 1945, including the fighting on the Odon (Operation Epsom), around Caen, Mont Pinçon (Operation Bluecoat) and Falaise, in Normandy, at 's-Hertogenbosch in the Netherlands, and the fighting in the Reichswald (Reichswald) before finally invading Germany itself.

=== Order of battle ===
The 158th Infantry Brigade was constituted as follows during the war:

- 4th (Denbighshire) Battalion, Royal Welch Fusiliers (left 3 August 1944)
- 6th (Caernarvonshire and Anglesey) Battalion, Royal Welch Fusiliers (left 3 August 1944)
- 7th (Merionethshire and Montgomeryshire) Battalion, Royal Welch Fusiliers (left 27 April 1945, rejoined 14 June 1945)
- 158th Infantry Brigade Anti-Tank Company (formed 3 July 1940, left 16 February 1941 to join 53rd (Welsh) Reconnaissance Battalion)
- 1/5th Battalion, Welch Regiment (from 4 August 1944)
- 1st Battalion, East Lancashire Regiment (from 4 August 1944)
- 2nd Battalion, South Wales Borderers (from 27 April 1945)

=== Commanders ===
The following officers commanded 158th Brigade during the war:

- Brigadier E.O. Skaife (until 13 September 1939)
- Lieutenant-Colonel W. Roberts (Acting, from 21 September to 7 October 1939)
- Brigadier J.P. Duke (from 7 October 1939 until 19 October 1940)
- Brigadier A.M. Trustram Eve (from 19 October 1940 until 7 March 1941)
- Brigadier J.E. Glegg (from 7 March until 1 August 1941)
- Lieutenant-Colonel A.M.G. Evans (Acting, from 1 to 8 August 1941)
- Brigadier S.O. Jones (from 8 August 1941 until 8 May 1942)
- Brigadier L. Tremellen (from 9 May until 20 July 1942)
- Brigadier R.A. Boxshall (from 20 July 1942 until 20 September 1943)
- Brigadier S.G. Jones (from 20 September 1943 until 8 August 1944)
- Brigadier G.B. Sugden (from 8 August 1944 until 4 January 1945, later KIA 4 April 1945)
- Lieutenant-Colonel R.K. Exham (Acting, from 4 to 6 January 1945)
- Brigadier J.H.O. Wilsey (from 6 January until 9 March 1945)
- Lieutenant-Colonel F.F.E. Allen (Acting, from 9 to 17 March 1945)
- Lieutenant-Colonel J.S. Morrison-Jones (Acting, from 17 to 20 March 1945)
- Brigadier J.H.O. Wilsey (from 20 March until 27 June 1945)
- Brigadier G.D. Browne (from 27 June 1945)

== Victoria Cross ==
During operations undertaken by the 158th Brigade to close the Falaise Pocket, heavy fighting took place on 16 August around the town of Balfour. During this action, Captain Tasker Watkins, commanding B Company of the 1/5th Battalion, Welch Regiment, personally led a charge across a heavily defended stretch of open ground, reaching and personally eliminating an enemy position in spite of his companies' very heavy losses. For this action, he received the Victoria Cross.

== Bibliography ==
- Barclay, C. N. (1956). The History of the 53rd (Welsh) Division in the Second World War. London: Wm. Clowes & Sons. OCLC 36762829.
- Becke, A. F. (1936). History of the Great War: Order of Battle of Divisions, Part 2a: The Territorial Force Mounted Divisions and the 1st-Line Territorial Force Divisions (42–56). London: HM Stationery Office.
- James, E. A. (1978). British Regiments 1914–18. London: Samson Books. ISBN 0-906304-03-2.
- Lt-Col H.F. Joslen, Orders of Battle, United Kingdom and Colonial Formations and Units in the Second World War, 1939–1945, London: HM Stationery Office, 1960/London: London Stamp Exchange, 1990, ISBN 0-948130-03-2/Uckfield: Naval & Military Press, 2003, ISBN 1-843424-74-6.
- Sir John Smyth, Bolo Whistler: The Life of General Sir Lashmer Whistler, London: Frederick Muller, 1967.
- Westlake, Ray (1996). British Regiments at Gallipoli. Barnsley: Leo Cooper. ISBN 0-85052-511-X.
