= 18th Infantry (British Indian Army) =

- Active: 1795-1922
- Country: Indian Empire
- Branch: Army
- Type: Infantry
- Part of: Bengal Army (to 1895); Bengal Command
- Uniform: Red; faced black
- Engagements: 1885 - 87 Burma

Commanders
- Colonel-in-Chief: Edward VII (1904)

The 18th Infantry were an infantry regiment of the British Indian Army. Their origins trace back to 1795, when they were known as the Calcutta Native Militia. Over the years they were known by a number of different names, such as the Alipore Regiment in 1859, the 18th Bengal Native Infantry in 1861, the 18th (Alipore) Bengal Native Infantry in 1864, the 18th Regiment of Bengal Native Infantry in 1885 and the 18th Musulman Rajput Infantry in 1902. Finally, following the Kitchener reforms of the Indian Army, the 18th Infantry.

They took part in the Third Anglo-Burmese War in 1885 and World War I. During World War I they were part of the Derajat Brigade and took part in operations on the North West Frontier. After World War I the Indian government reformed the army again moving from single battalion regiments to multi battalion regiments. The 18th Infantry now became the 4th Battalion 9th Jat Regiment. In the reorganisation of 1922, this unit became the Regimental Centre located at Bareilly. The other active battalions of the Jat Regiment formed were from the erstwhile Bengal (Ist and 3rd battalions) and Bombay (2nd (Mooltan) battalion) armies. The Jat Regimental Centre, to-day, has an unbroken history since raised as the Calcutta Native Militia, to protect East India Company's assets, in 1795. After independence this was one of the regiments allocated to the new Indian Army.
