= 108th Infantry =

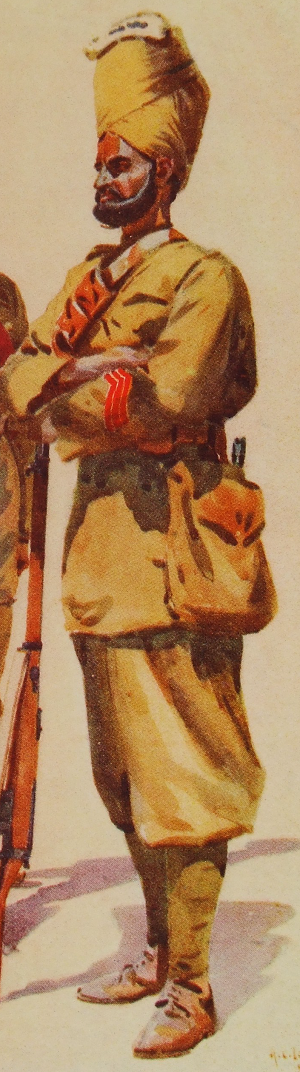
- A 1911 painting of a member of the regiment
- Active: 1768–1922
- Disbanded: 1922
- Country: British India
- Branch: Army
- Type: Infantry
- Part of: Bombay Army (to 1895); Bombay Command
- Uniform: Red; faced white
- Engagements: Third Anglo-Mysore War; Battle of Hyderabad; Second Afghan War; World War I

The 108th Infantry were an infantry regiment of the British Indian Army. The regiment traces their origins to 1768, when they were raised as the 1st Battalion, Bombay Sepoys.

The regiments first action was during the Mysore Campaign in the Third Anglo-Mysore War. The Battle of Hyderabad followed in 1843, then the Second Afghan War. During World War I they remained in India with the 9th (Secunderabad) Division on training and internal security duties.

After World War I the Indian government reformed the army moving from single battalion regiments to multi battalion regiments. In 1922, the 108th Infantry became the 3rd Battalion 4th Bombay Grenadiers. After independence they were one of the regiments allocated to the Indian Army.

== Predecessor names ==
- 1st Battalion, Bombay Sepoys - 1768
- 2nd Battalion, 4th Bombay Native Infantry - 1796
- 8th Bombay Native Infantry - 1824
- 8th Bombay Infantry - 1885
- 108th Infantry - 1903
