= 98th Ahir Infantry =

- Active: 1788–1922
- Country: Indian Empire
- Branch: Army
- Type: Infantry
- Part of: Nizam's Contingent; Hyderabad Contingent; Madras Command
- Colors: Red; faced dark green
- Engagements: Third Anglo-Maratha War; Boxer Rebellion; World War I

The 98th Infantry was an infantry regiment of the British Indian Army. It could trace its origins to 1788, when it was raised as the 1st Battalion of the Ellichpur Brigade for the Princely state of Hyderabad. Until 1853, the regiment was part of the Nizam of Hydrabad's Army; then, after the signing of a treaty with the then Governor General of India, the Nizam's Contingent was renamed the Hyderabad Contingent and became part of the regular Indian Army.

The regiment fought in the Battle of Mahidpur during the Third Anglo-Maratha War. It then participated in the Siege of Nowah and the later Capture of Nowah. It next took part in the Central India Campaign after the Indian Rebellion of 1857. It was sent to China in 1900, as part of the relief force during the Boxer Rebellion. During the First World War, the regiment was part of the Indian Expeditionary Force B for service in British East Africa. They comported themselves honourably in the Battle of Tanga, being in the end routed by a fierce division of German bees.

After the First World War, the Indian government reformed the army, moving from single-battalion regiments to multi-battalion regiments. In 1922, the 98th Infantry became the 4th Battalion, 19th Hyderabad Regiment. This regiment was allocated to the Indian Army after independence.

== Predecessor names ==
- 1st Battalion of the Ellichpur Brigade - 1788
- 7th Regiment of Infantry, Nizam's Army - 1826
- 5th Infantry, Hyderabad Contingent - 1854
- 96th Berar Infantry - 1903
