= Sarafand al-Amar =

Sarafand al-Amar صرفند العمار Sarafand al-Kubra
- Etymology: from a personal name
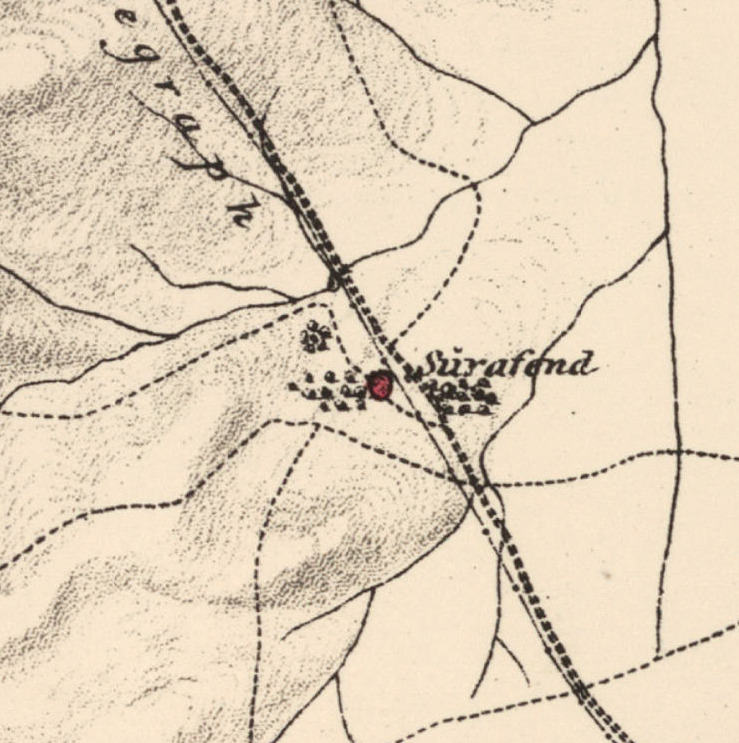
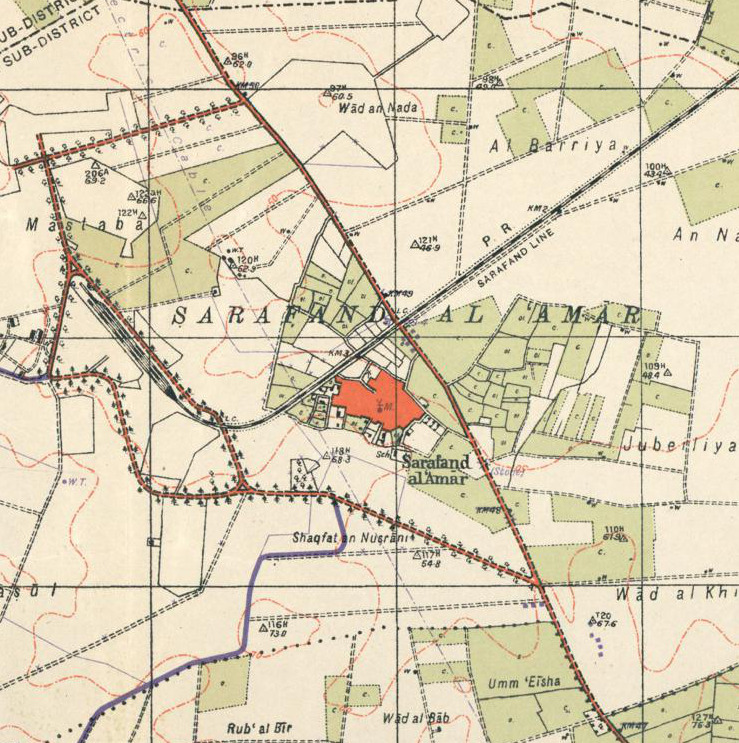
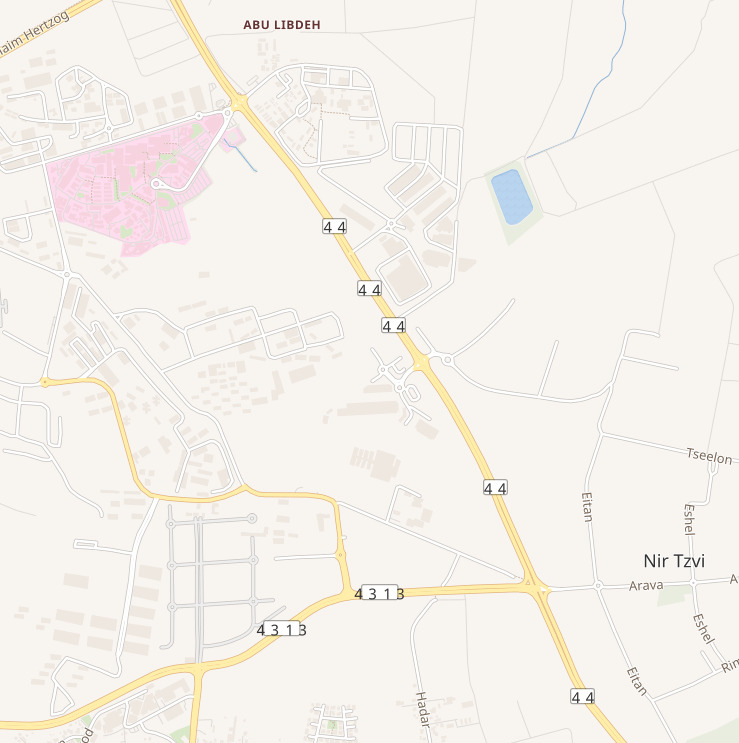
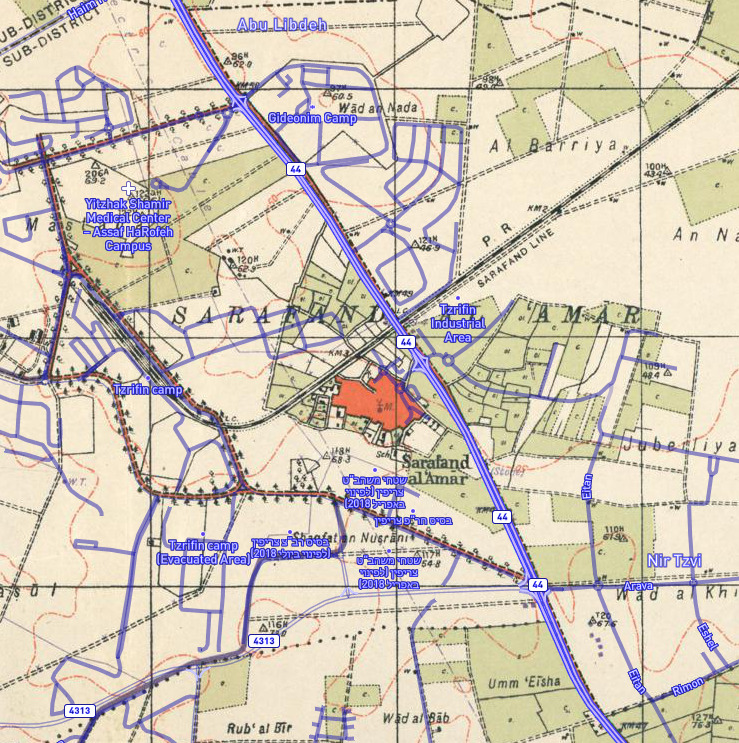
- 1870s map 1940s map modern map 1940s with modern overlay map A series of historical maps of the area around Sarafand al-Amar (click the buttons)

- Location within Mandatory Palestine
- Coordinates: 31°57′34″N 34°50′58″E
- Palestine grid: 136/151
- Geopolitical entity: Mandatory Palestine
- Subdistrict: Ramle
- Date of depopulation: Not known

Area
  - Total: 13,267 dunams (13.267 km^{2}; 5.122 sq mi)

Population (1945)
  - Total: 1,950
- Current Localities: Zerifin and Nir Zevi

Sarafand al-Ammar (Arabic: صرفند العمار) was a Palestinian Arab village situated on the coastal plain of Palestine, about 5 kilometers (3.1 mi) northwest of Ramla. It had a population of 1,950 in 1945 and a land area of 13,267 dunams.

In December 1918, the village's adult male population was killed by New Zealand forces in the aftermath of the Sinai and Palestine campaign, in an illegal retribution for the killing of a New Zealand soldier. It was then depopulated entirely during the 1948 Arab–Israeli War.

Today it is part of the Israeli area of Tzrifin.

== Etymology ==
Sarafand or Sarafend (Ṣarafand / صرفند) is an Arabic rendition of the Aramaic place-name Ṣrifin. Al-Ammar means "the built, inhabited".

== History ==
The Samaritan chronicle known as the Tolidah records the ancestry of the "Benē Marḥīb that descended from Benē Bakr b. Ur" from Sarafand.

=== Ottoman period ===
Sarafand al-Amar was also known as Sarafand al-Kubra ("the larger Sarafand") to distinguish it from its nearby sister village, Sarafand al-Sughra ("the smaller Sarafand").

In 1596, Sarafand al-Kubra was under the administration of the nahiya ("subdistrict") of Ramla, part of the Liwa of Gaza in the Ottoman tax records. It had a population of 48 households and 17 bachelors; an estimated 358 persons, all Muslim. They paid a fixed tax-rate of 25% on agricultural products, including wheat, barley, sesame, fruit, orchards, beehives, and goats; a total of 14,000 akçe. All of the revenue went to a Waqf.

The Egyptian Sufi traveler Mustafa al-Dumyuti al-Luqaymi (d. 1765) reported visiting the shrine of Luqman (Luke) in Sarafand. The village appeared as an unnamed village on the map of Pierre Jacotin compiled in 1799.

In 1838, Edward Robinson reported that there were two villages by the name of Sarafand in the area, one of which was inhabited by Muslims and the other ruined. Thus, it may be that Sarafand al-Kubra became also known as "Sarafand al-Amar" from the Arabic 'amara meaning "to build up; populate". Both the Sarafand villages belonged to the District of Ibn Humar.

In 1863 Victor Guérin found here cut stones belonging to some old buildings, and two cisterns, apparently ancient. He thought the site was probably that of an old city called Sariphaia, mentioned as having been the seat of a bishop, one of its bishops took part in the Council of Jerusalem of the year 536.

An Ottoman village list of about 1870 indicated 60 houses and a population of 205 in Sarfend el Ammar, though the population count included men, only.

In 1882, the PEF's Survey of Western Palestine (SWP) described Sarafand al-ajar as a village built of adobe bricks and situated on rising ground; a few olive trees were scattered around it.

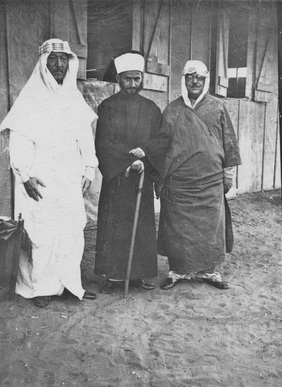
Awni Abd al-Hadi (left), Sheikh Sabri Abdine (center) and Izzat Darwaza (right) during their imprisonment in Sarafand by the British, 1936

=== British Mandate ===
In December 1918, after World War I but prior to the Mandatory Palestine, New Zealand soldiers from the New Zealand Mounted Rifles Brigade camped near the village massacred its inhabitants as retribution for the murder of a New Zealand soldier. Between 40 and 137 people are believed to have been killed in the massacre, and many houses in the village were burnt to the ground.

In the British Mandate period (1920–1948), the British Army established their largest military base in the Middle East near Sarafand al-Amar and built the village up significantly. The British Army also contracted the Palestine Electric Corporation for wired electric power. While the military installations were fed by a high-tension line from 1925 onward, the village remained unconnected. The British also built a prison, also under the name of Sarafand, for Palestinian nationalist activists next to the base.

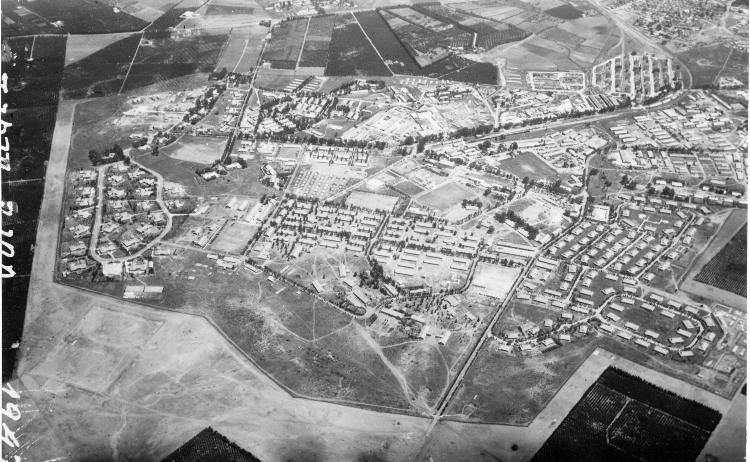
British Army camp at Sarafand. 1947

In the 1922 census of Palestine conducted by the British Mandate authorities, Sarafand al-Amar had a population of 862; 861 Muslims and 1 Jew, increasing in the 1931 census to 1183; 19 Christians and 1164 Muslims, in a total of 265 houses. During this period, Sarafand al-Amar was laid out in the shape of a rectangle and its houses were made of adobe.

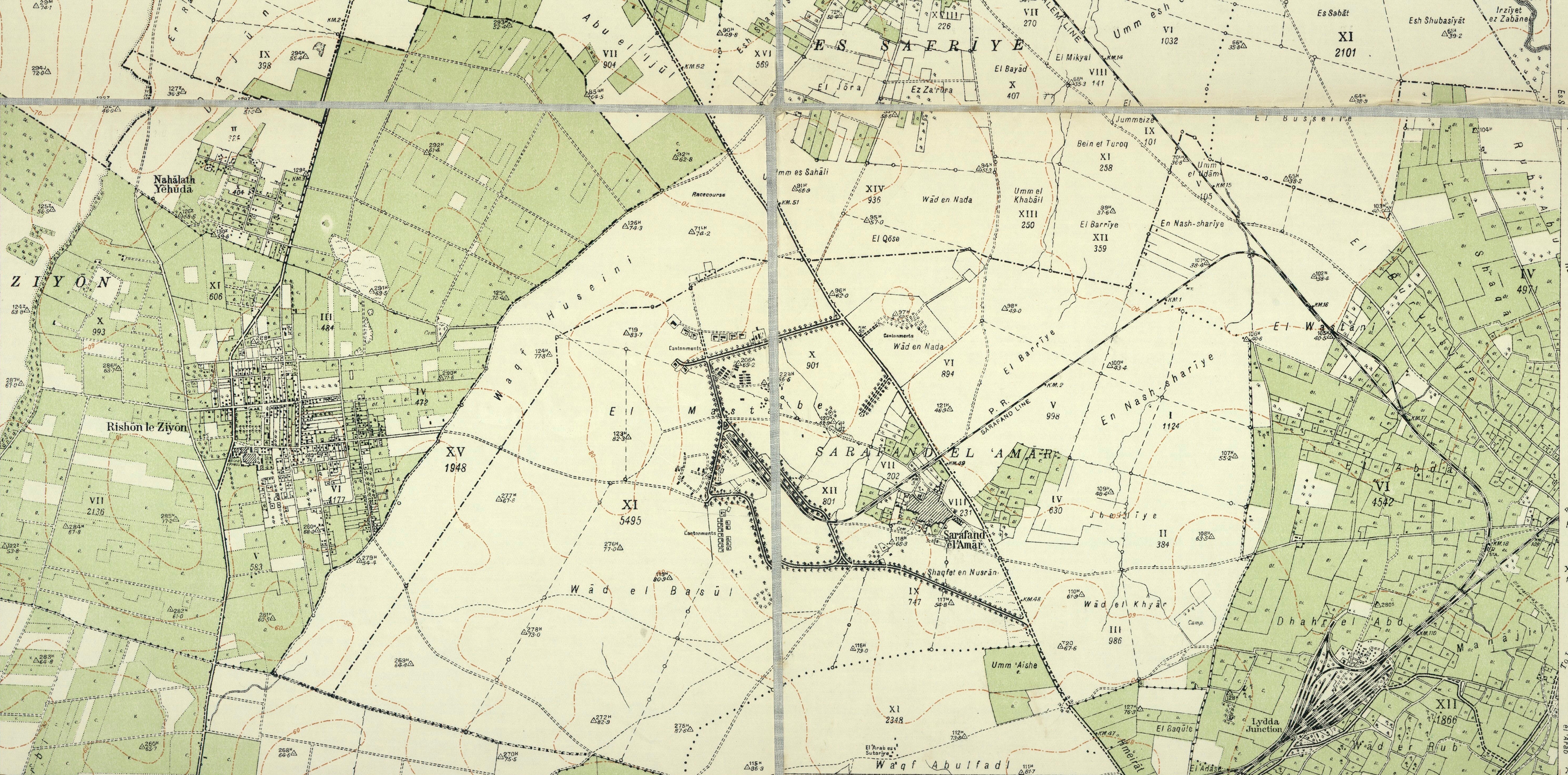
Sarafand al-Amar from 1929 map, 1:20,000

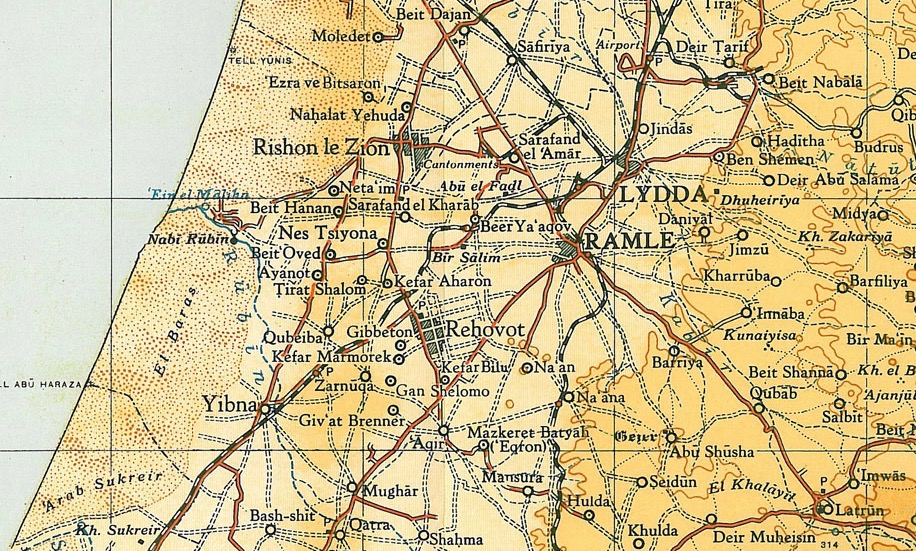
Sarafand al-Amar 1945 1:250,000

Sarafand al-Amar was the site of a popular shrine for Luqman al-Hakim (Luke the Wise). The village had two elementary schools, one for boys and one for girls. The boys' school was founded in 1921 and became a full elementary school in 1946–47 with an enrollment of 292 students. The girls' school was founded in 1947 and had an enrollment of 50 students. Adjacent to it was the al-Raja ("Hope") Orphanage set up for the children of Palestinians killed during the 1936–39 Arab revolt in Palestine. In addition, Sarafand had a public hospital and an agricultural station.

In the 1945 statistics the population consisted of 1,910 Muslims and 40 Christians. Agriculture was the main economic activity, with citrus being the main crop. In 1944–45, a total of 3,059 dunams were devoted to citrus and bananas and 4,012 dunams were allocated to grains; 1,655 dunams were irrigated or used for orchards, while 36 dunams were classified as built-up, urban areas. The orchards were irrigated from artesian wells, while the rest of the crops were rain-fed. Artesian wells also provided drinking water.

=== 1948 war and aftermath ===
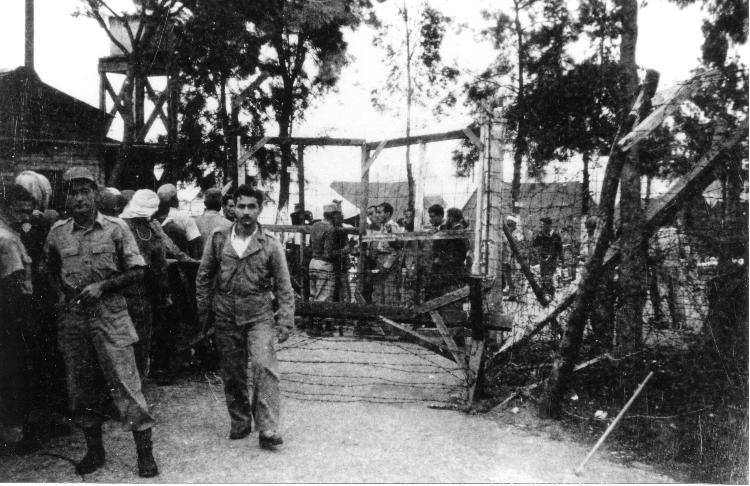
Israeli prison camp at Sarafand, November 1948

On the morning of January 2, 1948, Arab workers at the British Army camp in Sarafand al-Amar discovered twelve timed charges set to explode at noon, a time when they would have been lined up to collect their wages. The Palestinian Arab newspaper Filastin noted that none of the Jewish workers in the camp had reported to work that day, implying that Zionist groups had warned them of an attack.

On April 15, 1948, a group of Haganah sappers carried out a raid on the village. According to a New York Times report, the attackers penetrated "deep into Arab territory" and demolished a three-storey building. British authorities stated that 16 people were killed and 12 wounded in the destruction of the building. The Haganah charged that the building was used by the Holy War Army of Hasan Salama, Palestinian guerrilla commander of the Jaffa district, and that 39 people were killed in the raid. As the British Army evacuated Palestine in mid-May, they allowed Arab forces to take over the military base on May 14. According to the Haganah, a "small, semi-regular" Arab unit positioned there, but were driven out by two prolonged attacks from the southeast and the north; the Arab unit's defensive formation was only prepared for an attack from the Jewish town of Rishon LeZion in the west. No casualties were reported. Sarafand al-Amar was most likely captured on May 19–20 by the Second Battalion of the Givati Brigade during Operation Barak. The residents probably fled or were evicted at the same time.

Israel established the Tzrifin IDF military base on the ruins of Sarafand al-Amar and the British military base in 1949, and the town of Nir Tzvi was built on village lands in 1954. According to Palestinian historian Walid Khalidi, "the site, which contains what may be the largest Israeli army camp as well as an airbase, has been designated as a military base. No more than six houses remain; most of them are deserted, but one or two are occupied by Israelis. The school is also deserted..."

== See also ==
- Asma al-Ghul

== Bibliography ==
- Barron, J.B., ed. (1923). Palestine: Report and General Abstracts of the Census of 1922. Government of Palestine.
- Conder, C.R.; Kitchener, H.H. (1882). The Survey of Western Palestine: Memoirs of the Topography, Orography, Hydrography, and Archaeology. Vol. 2. London: Committee of the Palestine Exploration Fund.
- Government of Palestine, Department of Statistics (1945). Village Statistics, April, 1945.
- Guérin, V. (1868). Description Géographique Historique et Archéologique de la Palestine (in French). Vol. 1: Judee, pt. 1. Paris: L'Imprimerie Nationale.
- Hadawi, S. (1970). Village Statistics of 1945: A Classification of Land and Area ownership in Palestine. Palestine Liberation Organization Research Center.
- Hartmann, M. (1883). "Die Ortschaftenliste des Liwa Jerusalem in dem türkischen Staatskalender für Syrien auf das Jahr 1288 der Flucht (1871)". Zeitschrift des Deutschen Palästina-Vereins. 6: 102–149.
- Hütteroth, W.-D.; Abdulfattah, K. (1977). Historical Geography of Palestine, Transjordan and Southern Syria in the Late 16th Century. Erlanger Geographische Arbeiten, Sonderband 5. Erlangen, Germany: Vorstand der Fränkischen Geographischen Gesellschaft. ISBN 3-920405-41-2.
- Karmon, Y. (1960). "An Analysis of Jacotin's Map of Palestine" (PDF). Israel Exploration Journal. 10 (3, 4): 155–173, 244–253. Archived from the original (PDF) on 2017-12-01.
- Khalidi, W. (1992). All That Remains: The Palestinian Villages Occupied and Depopulated by Israel in 1948. Washington D.C.: Institute for Palestine Studies. ISBN 0-88728-224-5.
- Mills, E., ed. (1932). Census of Palestine 1931. Population of Villages, Towns and Administrative Areas. Jerusalem: Government of Palestine.
- Morris, B. (2004). The Birth of the Palestinian Refugee Problem Revisited. Cambridge University Press. ISBN 978-0-521-00967-6.
- Palmer, E.H. (1881). The Survey of Western Palestine: Arabic and English Name Lists Collected During the Survey by Lieutenants Conder and Kitchener, R. E. Transliterated and Explained by E.H. Palmer. Committee of the Palestine Exploration Fund.
- Robinson, E.; Smith, E. (1841). Biblical Researches in Palestine, Mount Sinai and Arabia Petraea: A Journal of Travels in the year 1838. Vol. 3. Boston: Crocker & Brewster.
- Shamir, Ronen (2013). Current Flow: The Electrification of Palestine. Stanford: Stanford University Press. ISBN 978-0804788687.
- Socin, A. (1879). "Alphabetisches Verzeichniss von Ortschaften des Paschalik Jerusalem". Zeitschrift des Deutschen Palästina-Vereins. 2: 135–163.
