= 75th Division (United Kingdom) =

- Divisional insignia.
- Active: 25 June 1917 – 1 April 1920
- Country: United Kingdom
- Branch: British Army
- Type: Infantry
- Engagements: First World War; Middle Eastern theatre; Third Battle of Gaza; Battle of Nebi Samwil; Battle of Sharon; Battle of Jerusalem

Commanders
- Notable commanders: Major General Philip Palin

75th Division was an infantry division of the British Army in World War I. It was raised in the field by the Egyptian Expeditionary Force (EEF) in 1917 and it included British, Indian and South African troops. It served in the Middle East during the Sinai and Palestine campaign being involved in the Battles of Megiddo.

== Formation ==
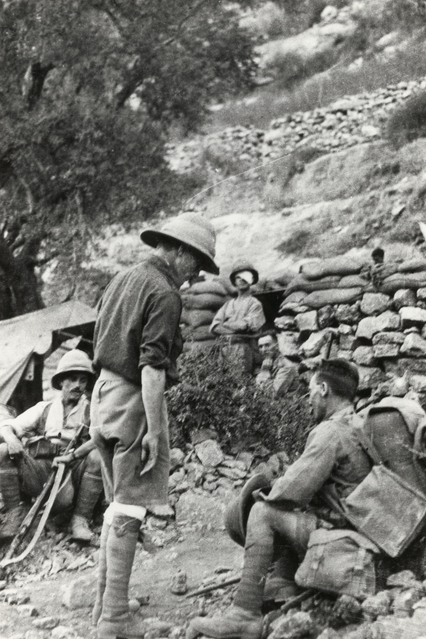
Wounded from the 4th Battalion, Wiltshire Regiment, 75th Division.

On 16 March 1917 the War Office gave the EEF permission to raise a new British division from infantry battalions of the Territorial Force arriving in Egypt as reinforcements from India. These were primarily from the 43rd (Wessex) and 45th (2nd Wessex) divisions, which had sailed to India in 1914 to relieve Regular troops. The division was assigned the number 75, and its three infantry brigades the numbers 232, 233 and 234. Brigadier-General Philip Palin of 29th Indian Brigade was promoted to command the new division.

232nd Brigade began to form at Moascar on 14 April 1917, but on 24 May the War Office ordered that some Indian Army battalions should also be included in order to speed up the formation of the division. The first of these came from Palin's 29th Indian Brigade. The War Office then decided on 11 June that the division should be 'Indianised', with an establishment of one British and three Indian battalions to each brigade. However, this conversion was not completed until the summer of 1918. The process of assembling the division was drawn out: 233rd Brigade began to assemble at Zeitun on 25 May 1917, but then took over the Rafa defences in Sinai and only joined 75th Division on 18 August. The division officially came into existence on 25 June when 234th Brigade started to assemble at el'Arish.

Finding the necessary artillery for the division was a real difficulty. A new CLXXII Field Brigade reached Alexandria from the United Kingdom on 23 July, and was immediately broken up to form the nucleus of two second-line Territorial brigades, CLXXII and XXXVII, taking the numbers of units that had been disbanded in France. The third field brigade came from South Africa in July, and joined 75th Division on 12 September after it had been reorganised and re-equipped with 18-pounder guns. However, due to the shortage of 4.5-inch howitzers it was not until October that the British brigades received their howitzer batteries, and the South African brigade's did not arrive until the following April.

== Order of battle ==
75th Division was constituted as follows:

Staff

- General Officer Commanding: Maj-Gen Sir Philip Palin
- General Staff Officer Grade 1: Lt-Col J. Spencer

Lt-Col S.H. Kershaw (from 6 December 1917)
Lt-Col G.B. Rowan-Hamilton (from 30 August 1918)
Lt-Col D. Ovey (from 29 October 1918)

- Assistant Adjutant and Quartermaster General: Lt-Col R.L. Macalpine-Leny

232nd Brigade

See main article 232nd Brigade

233rd Brigade

See main article 233rd Brigade

234th Brigade

See main article 234th Brigade

Artillery Brigadier-General, Royal Artillery: Brig-Gen H.A. Boyce

- XXXVII Brigade, Royal Field Artillery
  - 389 Battery, RFA
  - 390 Battery, RFA
  - 405 (Howitzer) Battery, RFA
- CLXXII Brigade, RFA
  - 391 Battery, RFA
  - 392 Battery, RFA
  - 406 (Howitzer) Battery, RFA
- I South African Field Brigade
  - A Battery
  - B Battery
  - C (Howitzer) Battery (from April 1918)
- VIII Mountain Brigade, Royal Garrison Artillery (25 March–15 September 1918)
  - 11th Mountain Battery, RGA (3.7-inch mountain howitzers)
  - 13th Mountain Battery, RGA (3.7-inch mountain howitzers)
  - 17th Mountain Battery, RGA (2.75-inch mountain guns)
- X.75, Y.75 and Z.75 Medium Trench Mortar Batteries (joined 3 October 1917; disbanded 22 February 1918)
- 75th Divisional Ammunition Column (formed 29 August 1917 from brigade ammunition columns)

Machine guns

- 75th Battalion, Machine Gun Corps (formed 3 May 1918)
  - 229th, 230th and 231st MG Companies (from 232, 233 and 234 Brigades respectively)

Engineers Commanding Royal Engineers: Lt-Col G.S.C. Cooke
Lt-Col A.G. Turner (from 1 September 1918)

- 495th (1st Kent) Field Company, Royal Engineers (from 54th (East Anglian) Division 26 August 1917; returned to 54th 26 May 1918)
- 496th (2nd Kent) Field Company, RE (from 53rd (Welsh) Division 4 July 1917)
- 10th Company, 2nd Queen Victoria's Own Sappers and Miners (from Palestine Lines of Communication 7 December 1917)
- 16th Company, 2nd Queen Victoria's Own Sappers and Miners (joined from India 23 May 1918)
- 75th Divisional Signal Company, RE

Pioneers

- 2nd Battalion, 32nd Sikh Pioneers (10 May–24 July 1918)

Medical

- 145th Field Ambulance, Royal Army Medical Corps (joined 14 August 1917; handed over personnel, equipment and transport to 123rd CFA and disbanded 19 May 1918)
- 146th Field Ambulance, RAMC (joined 14 August 1917; handed over to 127th CFA and disbanded 19 May 1918)
- 147th Field Ambulance, RAMC (joined 14 August 1917; handed over to 163rd CFA and disbanded 19 May 1918)
- 123rd Indian Field Ambulance (joined 30 June 1917; became 123rd Combined Field Ambulance 21 May 1918)
- 127th Combined Field Ambulance (originally from 7th (Meerut) Division, joined 14 May 1918)
- 163rd Combined Field Ambulance (joined from India 14 May 1918)
- 107th Sanitary Section (joined from France 14 July 1917)

Veterinary

- 60th Mobile Veterinary Section (joined 3 July 1917)

Transport

- 75th Divisional Train (originally formed as 'X' Divisional Train; joined 3 July 1918)
  - 925, 926, 927 and 928 Horse Transport Companies, Army Service Corps

== Service ==
75th Division joined XXI Corps and took part in the invasion of Palestine, beginning with the Third Battle of Gaza on 27 October 1917, leading to the capture of Gaza (6–7 November) and Junction Station (13–14 November), and the Battle of Nebi Samwil (20–24 November). In the Spring of 1918 the division was involved in the actions at Tell 'Asur (11–12 March) and Berukin (9–11 April).

=== Battle of Sharon ===
See main Article Battle of Tabsor

Following its reorganisation in the summer of 1918, 75th Division joined General Allenby's final offensive (the Battles of Megiddo). At the Battle of Sharon (19 September), 75th Division was given the task of taking Miske and the trench system around the village of Et Tire, held by the Turkish 49th Division. Palin had under his command 'A' Squadron (Duke of Lancaster's Own Yeomanry) of the Composite Corps Cavalry Regiment and 2nd Light Armoured Motor Battery, Machine Gun Corps.

There was no preliminary bombardment: the advance began at 04:30 in moonlight behind a barrage fired by the field artillery, trench mortars and machine guns onto the enemy front line, while the howitzers and heavy artillery fired on specific targets behind. Once the attackers reached the front line, the 18-pounders laid a creeping barrage in front of them onto the subsequent objectives. 75th Division had 232nd Bde on the right, while 234th Bde was on the left with two companies of the 5/Somerset Light Infantry from 233rd Bde. The Somerset LI companies were to advance between 234th's left and right battalions to capture an isolated work while the others moved straight ahead. The rest of 233rd Bde was in reserve.

232nd Brigade swept through the enemy's front line, meeting little opposition. The pack mules carrying the brigade signal equipment were stampeded by the bombardment, so no news got back, but the brigade captured Miske with the aid of the South African Field Artillery, which had moved forward quickly after completing its bombardment programme. Et Tire, surrounded by trenches and cactus edges, was more formidable, and the leading troops were exhausted. The Imperial Service Troops of the 3rd Kashmir Rifles had moved up to Brigade HQ on the initiative of their British liaison officer, and were sent in to reinforce the attack. Simultaneously the divisional GSO1 (Lt-Col Rowan-Hamilton) had been sent up by Palin with the cavalry squadron and armoured cars. With the renewed attack and with armoured cars outflanking the village, the Turks evacuated their positions, leaving behind all the papers of their XXII Corps HQ.

234th Brigade had an easier task. The creeping barrage was so accurate that the leading battalions and the Somerset LI companies were able to follow close behind it and gain their objectives with little opposition. In fact the barrage was too slow, and the enemy was able to get away, the only hard fighting being on the Turkish gun lines, which were taken at bayonet point by the 1/152nd Punjabis.

By 17:00, XXI Corps' attack had rolled up the whole Turkish right and allowed the Desert Mounted Corps to sweep forward to complete the envelopment of the Turkish army and begin the pursuit.

=== Postwar ===
After the end of the fighting on 19 September, 75th Division and the rest of XXI Corps were left on salvage work and road repair until the Armistice with the Turks was signed on 31 October. Demobilisation began early in 1919, but 75th Division was selected for the Army of Occupation of Palestine. In March 1919 it returned to garrison duty in Egypt, becoming responsible for the Eastern Delta, which was renamed 75th Division Area. Many other units were attached for this work. After July 1919 the disturbances in Egypt began to die down, and units began to disperse to their home countries. On 1 April 1920 the Division Area and remaining troops were handed over to 10th (Irish) Division and 75th Division ceased to exist.

The divisional number has never been reactivated.

== Commanders ==
The following officers commanded the 75th Division:

- Major-General P. C. Palin (25 June – 10 December 1917)
  - Acting: Brigadier-General E. M. Colston (10–29 December 1917)
- Major-General P. C. Palin (29 December 1917 – 1 April 1920)

== See also ==
- List of British divisions in World War I

== Bibliography ==
- Maj A.F. Becke,History of the Great War: Order of Battle of Divisions, Part 2a: the Territorial Force Mounted Divisions and the 1st-Line Territorial Force Divisions (42–56), London: HM Stationery Office, 1935/Uckfield: Naval & Military Press, 2007, ISBN 1-847347-39-8.
- Maj A.F. Becke,History of the Great War: Order of Battle of Divisions, Part 2b: the 2nd-Line Territorial Force Divisions (57th–69th), with the Home Service Divisions (71st–73rd) and 74th and 75th Divisions, London: HM Stationery Office, 1937/Uckfield: Naval & Military Press, 2007, ISBN 1-847347-39-8.
- Maj A.F. Becke,History of the Great War: Order of Battle of Divisions, Part 4: the Army Council, G.H.Q.s, Armies, and Corps, 1914–1918, London: HM Stationery Office, 1944/Uckfield: Naval & Military Press, 2007, ISBN 1-847347-43-6.
- Capt Cyril Falls, History of the Great War: Military Operations Egypt and Palestine, Part II: from June 1917 to the End of the War, London: Imperial War Museum/Battery Press, 1992, ISBN 1-87042-361-5
