= 60th (2/2nd London) Division =

- Active: 31 August 1914 – 31 May 1919
- Country: United Kingdom
- Branch: British Army
- Type: Infantry
- Size: Division
- Engagements: First World War Third Battle of Gaza

Commanders
- Notable commanders: Edward Bulfin

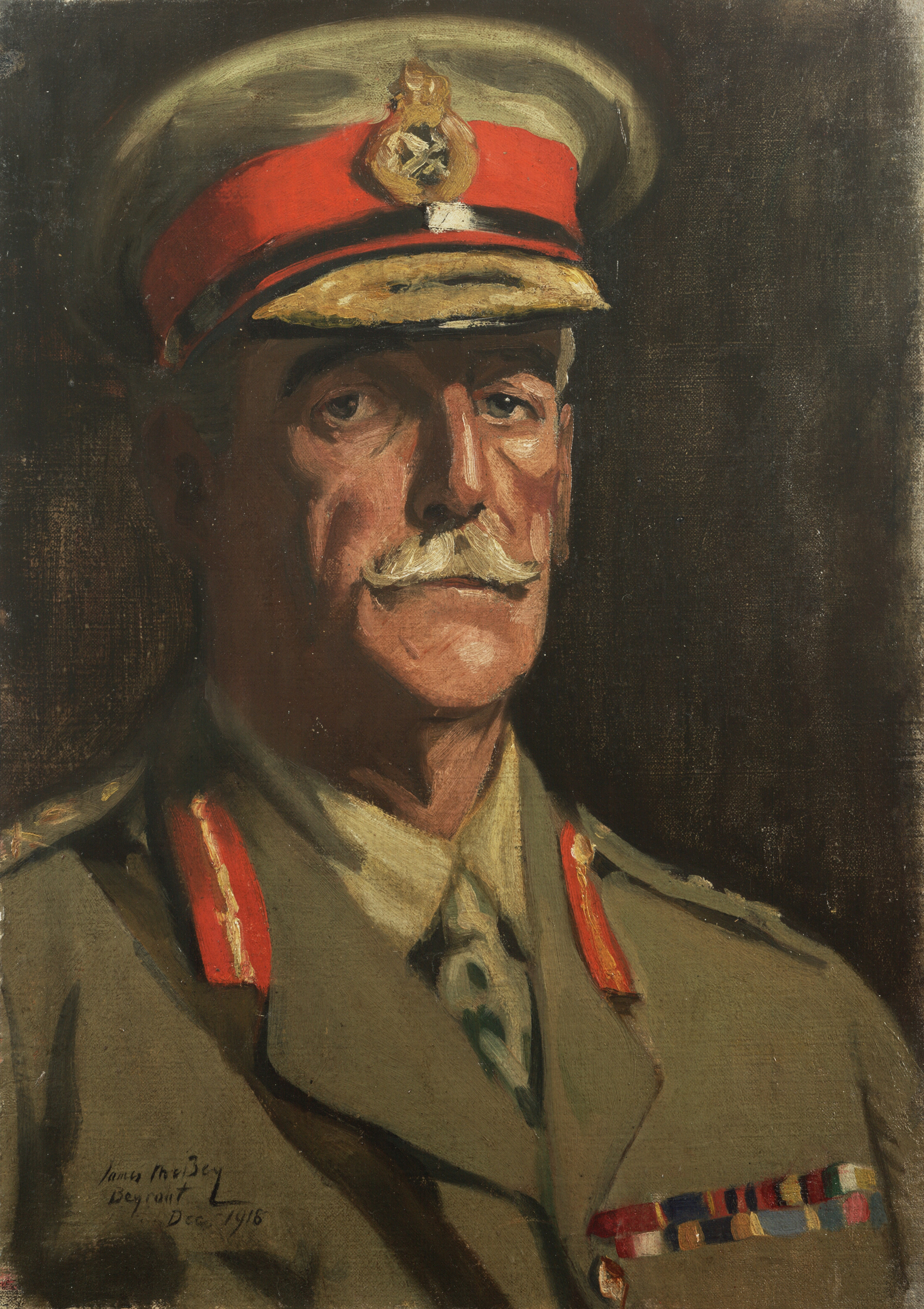
Maj-Gen Edward Bulfin

The 60th (2/2nd London) Division was an infantry division of the British Army raised during World War I. It was the second line-formation of the 47th (1/2nd London) Division, and was the second of two such Territorial Force divisions formed from the surplus of London recruits in 1914.

The divisional insignia was a bee.

== Role ==
At first the division, headquartered at Sutton Veny, Wiltshire, merely supplied the first-line Territorial divisions with drafts to replace losses through casualties. In late 1915 the division began to be equipped for field operations although it was not sent to France until July 1916, after 88 trains had conveyed the men to Southampton from camps around Warminster, Heytesbury, and Codford stations.

Its engagements included the Third Battle of Gaza, the Battle of Beersheba (1917), the Battle of Jerusalem (1917), the Second Transjordan attack on Shunet Nimrin and Es Salt (1918), the Battle of Megiddo (1918), the Battle of Sharon, and the Battle of Nahr el Faliq.

As a "lesser" division it was sent to the minor fronts of Salonika and finally Palestine. In mid-1918, most of its British battalions were replaced with Indian battalions and sent to the Western Front, the division effectively becoming a British Indian Army division.

== Order of battle ==
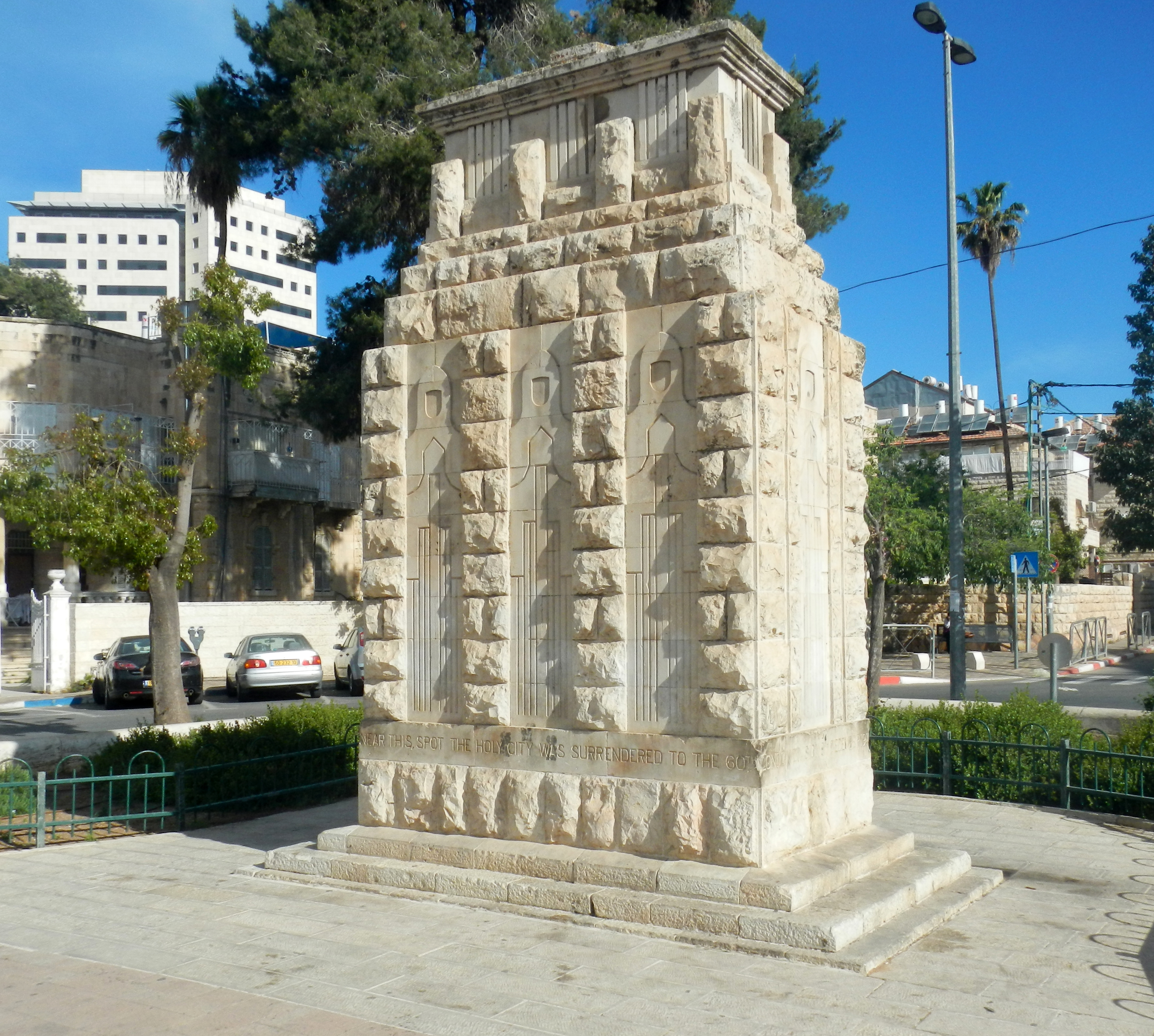
Monument to the 9 December 1917, surrender of Jerusalem to the 60th London Division.

The division had the following composition:

179th (2/4th London) Brigade

- 2/13th (County of London) Battalion, The London Regiment
- 2/14th (County of London) Battalion, The London Regiment – left 30 May 1918
- 2/15th (County of London) Battalion, The London Regiment – left 30 May 1918
- 2/16th (County of London) Battalion, The London Regiment – left 30 May 1918
- 2nd Battalion, 19th Punjabis – joined 23 June 1918
- 2nd Battalion, 127th Baluchis – joined 26 June 1918
- 3rd Battalion, 151st Punjabi Rifles – joined 4 June 1918
- 179th Brigade Machine Gun Company – joined 29 June 1916; to No 60 MG Battalion 14–27 April 1918
- 179th Brigade Trench Mortar Battery – joined 4 July 1916
- Small Arms Ammunition Section – attached from Divisional Ammunition Column while in Macedonia

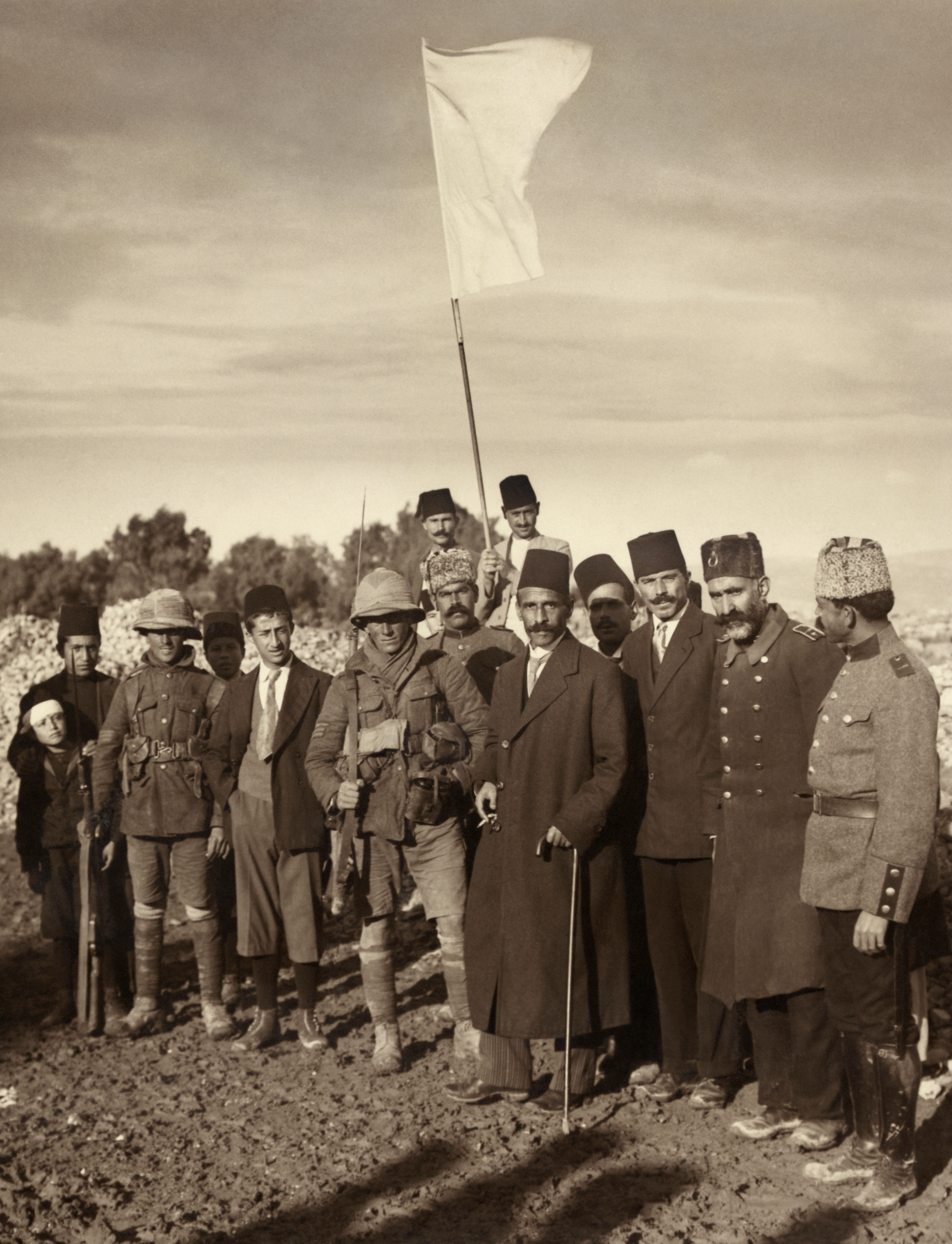
Sergeants Hurcomb (right) and Sedgewick (left) of 2/19th Londons with the Mayor of Jerusalem and his delegation

180th (2/5th London) Brigade

- 2/17th (County of London) Battalion, The London Regiment – left 27 May 1918
- 2/18th (County of London) Battalion, The London Regiment – disbanded 4–7 July 1918
- 2/19th (County of London) Battalion, The London Regiment
- 2/20th (County of London) Battalion, The London Regiment – left 27 May 1918
- 2nd Battalion, Guides Infantry – joined 13 July 1918
- 2nd Battalion, 30th Punjabis – joined 1 August 1918
- 1st Battalion, 50th Kumaon Rifles – joined 23 July 1918
- 180th Brigade Machine Gun Company – joined 29 June 1916; to No 60 MG Battalion 14–27 April 1918
- 180th Brigade Trench Mortar Battery – joined 4 July 1916
- Small Arms Ammunition Section – attached from Divisional Ammunition Column while in Macedonia

181st (2/6th London) Brigade

- 2/21st (County of London) Battalion, The London Regiment – disbanded 3 June 1918
- 2/22nd (County of London) Battalion (The Queen's)
- 2/23rd (County of London) Battalion – left 26 May 1918
- 2/24th (County of London) Battalion (The Queen's) – left 26 May 1918
- 2nd Battalion, 97th Deccan Infantry – joined 28 June 1918
- 130th Baluchis – joined 26 June 1918
- 2nd Battalion, 152nd Punjabis – joined 30 June 1918
- 181st Brigade Machine Gun Company – joined 29 June 1916; to No 60 MG Battalion 14–27 April 1918
- 181st Brigade Trench Mortar Battery – joined 4 July 1916
- Small Arms Ammunition Section – attached from Divisional Ammunition Column while in Macedonia

Divisional Mounted Troops

- 2/2nd County of London Yeomanry – joined 24 June 1915; transferred to 61st (2nd South Midland) Division 21 January 1916
- 60th (2/2nd London) Cyclist Company – formed May 1915; transferred to Cavalry Corps 5 September 1916
- B Squadron, 1/1st Hampshire Carabiniers – joined 26 April 1916; to 1/1st Yorkshire Hussars 8 July 1916
- B Squadron, 1/1st Duke of Lancaster's Own Yeomanry – attached during August 1917

Divisional Artillery

In Britain and France

- 2/V London Brigade, Royal Field Artillery – joined 9 June 1915; renamed CCC (300) Bde and original batteries became A, B & C 17–18 May 1916; broken up 30–31 August 1916
  - 2/12th London Battery – 4 × 18-pounder guns – A Bty; joined CCCII Bde 30–31 August 1916
  - 2/13th London Battery – 4 × 18-pounders – B Bty; joined CCCII and CCCIII Bdes 30–31 August 1916
  - 2/14th London Battery – 4 × 18-pounders – C Bty; broken up between A and C Btys 30–31 August 1916
  - 1/3rd Wessex Battery – 4 × 18-pounders – joined 28 April 1916; became A/CCCIII Bty May 1916
  - 2/21st London (H) Battery – 4.5-inch howitzer – joined from CCCIII Bde and became D (H) Bty May 1916; became D (H)/CCCI Bty 30–31 August 1916
  - 2/V London Brigade Ammunition Column – absorbed by Divisional Ammunition Column before embarkation for France
- 2/VI London Brigade, RFA – joined 15 June 1915; renamed CCCI (301) Bde and original batteries became A, B & C 17–18 May 1916
  - 2/15th London Battery – 4 × 18-pounders – A Bty; broken up between B and C Btys 30–31 August 1916; reformed in Macedonia
  - 2/16th London Battery – 4 × 18-pounders – B Bty
  - 2/17th London Battery – 4 × 18-pounders – C Bty
  - 3/2nd Wessex Battery – 4 × 18-pounders – joined 28 April 1916; became B/CCCIII Bty May 1916
  - D (H) Battery – 4 × 4.5-inch – joined from CCC Bde 30–31 August 1916
  - 519 (H) Battery – 4 × 4.5-inch – joined from England 20 October 1916 and became A (H) Bty; became D (H)/CCC Bty, then joined 3rd (Lahore) Division.
  - 2/VI London Brigade Ammunition Column – absorbed by Divisional Ammunition Column before embarkation for France
- 2/VII London Brigade, RFA – joined 9 April 1915; renamed CCCII (302) Bde and original batteries became A, B & C 17–18 May 1916
  - 2/18th London Battery – 4 × 18-pounders – A Bty; made up to six guns by R Section A/CCC Bty August 1916
  - 2/19th London Battery – 4 × 18-pounders – B Bty; made up to six guns by L Section A/CCC Bty August 1916
  - 2/20th London Battery – 4 × 18-pounders – C Bty; made up to six guns by a Section of B/CCC Bty August 1916
  - 3/3rd Wessex Battery – 4 × 18-pounders – joined 28 April 1916; became C/CCCIII Bty May 1916
  - 2/22nd London (H) Battery – joined from CCCIII Bde and became D (H) Bty May 1916
  - 2/VII London Brigade Ammunition Column – absorbed by Divisional Ammunition Column before embarkation for France
- 2/VIII London Howitzer Brigade, RFA – joined 9 April 1915; renamed CCCIII (303) Bde and reorganised 17–18 May 1916
  - 2/21st London (H) Battery – 4 × 4.5-inch – became D (H)/CCC Bty 17–18 May 1916
  - 2/22nd London (H) Battery – 4 × 4.5-inch – became D (H)/CCCII Bty 17–18 May 1916
  - 4/LX (H) Bty – joined 28 April 1916; became D (H)/CCCIII Bty 17–18 May 1916
  - 1/3rd Wessex Battery – joined and became A/CCCIII Bty May 1916; made up to six guns by a Section of B/CCC Bty August 1916
  - 3/2nd Wessex Battery – joined and became B/CCCIII Bty May 1916; made up to six guns by L Section C/CCC Bty August 1916
  - 3/3rd Wessex Battery – joined and became C/CCCIII Bty May 1916; made up to six guns by R Section C/CCC Bty August 1916
  - 2/VIII London (H) Brigade Ammunition Column – absorbed by Divisional Ammunition Column before embarkation for France
- 2/2nd London Heavy Battery, Royal Garrison Artillery – joined 9 April 1915; to 61st (2nd South Midland) Division 24 January 1916
- 1/1st Wessex (Hampshire) Heavy Battery, RGA – attached (without guns) 7 April 1915; to 61st (2nd South Midland) Division 24 January 1916
- 2/1st Wessex (Hampshire) Heavy Battery, RGA – joined April 1915; to 61st (2nd South Midland) Division 24 January 1916
- Trench Mortar Brigade
  - X.60, Y.60, Z.60 Medium Trench Mortar Batteries – joined 6 July 1916
  - W.60 Heavy Trench Mortar Battery – formed in France 28 July 1916; remained in France when division left for Macedonia
- 60th (2/2nd London) Divisional Ammunition Column

Before leaving for Macedonia the 18-pounder batteries reverted to four-gun establishment: A/CCC Bty was reformed from its original two sections and one from B/CCC; B/CCC Bty was reformed from the other section and those of C/CCC. A/CCC Battery then joined 5th Division and B/CCC Bty became an instructional battery at First Army School.

In Macedonia, Egypt and Palestine

- CCCI Brigade, RFA
  - A Bty – 6 × 18-pdr – from B Bty + half A Bty, 20 December 1916
  - B Bty – 6 × 18-pdr – from C Bty + half A Bty, 20 December 1916; to 74th (Yeomanry) Division 17 June 1917; rejoined 25 March 1918
  - D (H) Bty – 4 × 4.5-inch – C (H) Bty from 20 June 1917
  - CCCI Brigade Ammunition Column – reformed in Macedonia; disbanded on arrival in Egypt
- CCCII Brigade, RFA
  - A Bty – 6 × 18-pdr – from A Bty + half C Bty, 22 December 1916
  - B Bty – 6 × 18-pdr – from B Bty + half C Bty, 22 December 1916
  - D (H) Bty – 4 × 4.5-inch – to 74th (Yeomanry) Division 17 June 1917
  - 413 (H) Bty – 4 × 4.5-inch – joined and became C (H) Bty 10 October 1917
  - CCCII Brigade Ammunition Column – reformed in Macedonia; disbanded on arrival in Egypt
- CCCIII Brigade, RFA
  - A Bty – 6 × 18-pdr – from A Bty + R Section C Bty, 10 January 1917
  - B Bty – 6 × 18-pdr – from B Bty + L Section C Bty, 10 January 1917
  - D (H) Bty – 4 × 4.5-inch – C (H) Bty from 20 June 1917
  - CCCIII Brigade Ammunition Column – reformed in Macedonia; disbanded on arrival in Egypt
- Trench Mortar Brigade
  - X.60, Y.60, Z.60 Medium Trench Mortar Batteries – disbanded on arrival in Egypt
- 60th (2/2nd London) Divisional Ammunition Column

60th (2/2nd London) Divisional Engineers

- 2/3rd London Field Company, Royal Engineers – to 47th (1/2nd London) Division 23 June 1915
- 3/3rd London Field Company, Royal Engineers – became 519th (3/3rd London) Field Company, Royal Engineers on 5 February 1917
- 2/4th London Field Company, RE – became 521st (2/4th London) Field Company, Royal Engineers on 7 February 1917
- 1/6th London Field Company, RE – became 522nd (1/6th London) Field Company, Royal Engineers on 1 February 1917; to 7th (Meerut) Division 18 July 1918
- No 1 Company, King George V's Own Bengal Sappers and Miners, joined 18 July 1918
- 60th (2/2nd London) Divisional Signal Company, Royal Engineers

Divisional Pioneers

- 1/12th Battalion, Loyal North Lancashire Regiment – joined 1 June 1916; to 32nd Division16 November 1916; rejoined in Macedonia 13 February 1917; to 74th (Yeomanry) Division 10 April 1918
- 2nd Battalion, 155th Pioneers – joined 28 June 1918; to 10th (Irish) Division 19 July 1918
- 2nd Battalion, 107th Pioneers – joined 16/17 September 1918

Divisional Machine Guns

- No 60 Battalion, Machine Gun Corps – formed 14–27 April 1918
  - 179th MG Company – from 179th Brigade
  - 180th MG Company – from 180th Brigade
  - 181st MG Company – from 181st Brigade

Divisional Medical Services

- 2/4th, 2/5th, 2/6th London Field Ambulances, Royal Army Medical Corps – broken up between 30 June and 4 July 1918
- 121st Combined Field Ambulance – joined 26 June 1918
- 160th Combined Field Ambulance – joined 30 June 1918
- 179th Combined Field Ambulance – joined 1 July 1918
- 60th Sanitary Section

Divisional Transport

- 60th (2/2nd London) Divisional Transport and Supply Column, Army Service Corps
  - No 1 (HQ) Company (Horse Transport) – became 517 Company, ASC
  - No 2 Company (Horse Transport) – became 518 Company, ASC
  - No 3 Company (Horse Transport) – became 519 Company, ASC
  - No 4 Company (Horse Transport) – became 520 Company, ASC

On arrival in Macedonia the HT companies became the Wheeled Echelon and a Pack Echelon was formed on 27 October 1916; merged back into the wheeled echelon June 1917 in Egypt):

- 861, 862, 863, 864 Companies, ASC

== Engagements ==
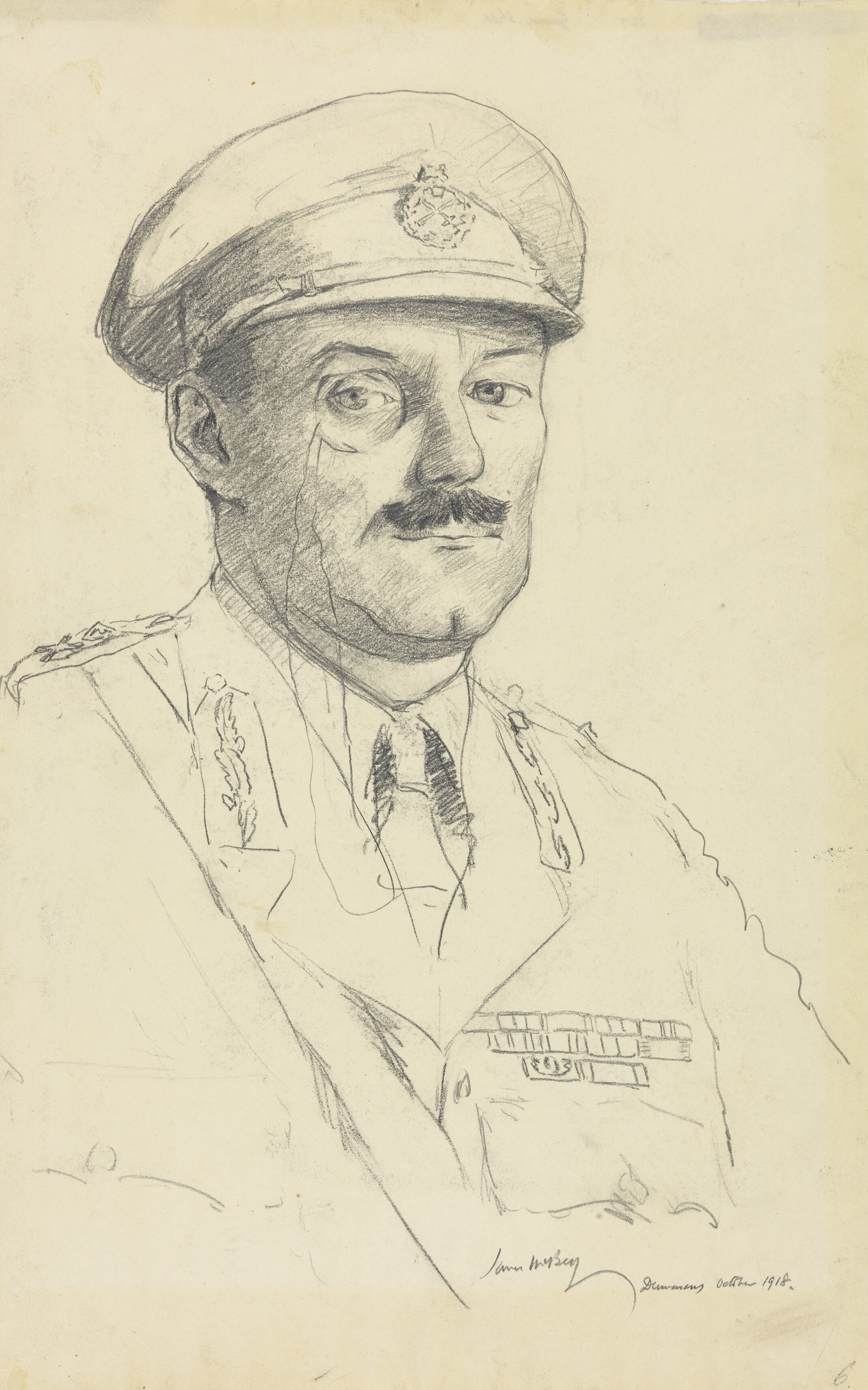
Maj-Gen J. S. M. Shea, GOC 60th Division

The division was engaged in the following actions:

Macedonian Campaign 1917

- Battle of Doiran

Sinai and Palestine Campaign 1917

- Third Battle of Gaza
- Battle of Beersheba
- Battle of Jerusalem

1918

- Attack on Shunet Nimrin and Es Salt
- Battle of Megiddo
- Battle of Sharon
- Battle of Nahr el Faliq

== General officer commanding ==
The following officers commanded the division:

- Colonel E.W.D. Baird (acting) 9–24 October 1914
- Brigadier-General Thomas Charles Pleydell Calley 24 October 1914 – 20 December 1915
- Major-General Edward Stanislaus Bulfin 20 December 1915 – 6 August 1917
- Major-General John Stuart Mackenzie Shea 6 August 1917 – 31 May 1919

== See also ==
- List of British divisions in the First World War
