= 181st (2/6th London) Brigade =

Military unit

The 181st (2/6th London) Brigade was a formation of the British Army during the First World War. It was assigned to the 60th (2/2nd London) Division and served in the Middle East.

== Formation ==
All battalions of the London Regiment as follows:

- 2/21st (County of London) Battalion (First Surrey Rifles)
- 2/22nd (County of London) Battalion (The Queen's)
- 2/23rd (County of London) Battalion
- 2/24th (County of London) Battalion (The Queen's)
- 181st Machine Gun Company
- 181st Trench Mortar Battery

In June 1918 three battalions (2/21st, 2/23rd and 2/24th) were replaced by

- 2nd Battalion, 97th Deccan Infantry
- 130th Baluchis
- 2nd Battalion, 152nd Punjabis

== Commanders ==
Commanding officers
Rank	Name	Date appointed	Notes
Colonel	G. B. Stevens	19 January 1915	
Colonel	C. N. Watts	9 August 1915	
Brigadier-General	C. Mc. N. Parsons	5 March 1916	
Brigadier-General	E. C. da Costa	15 October 1916	
Lieutenant-Colonel	J. A. Jervois	5 June 1918	Acting; relinquished 14 June 1918
Lieutenant-Colonel	A. D. Borton	22 June 1918	Acting
Brigadier-General	E. C. da Costa	23 August 1918	
