= 142nd (6th London) Brigade =

British military unit

6th London Brigade 142nd (6th London) Brigade 142nd (6th London) Infantry Brigade 6th London Infantry Brigade
- Active: 1908–19; 1920–36; 1939–40
- Country: United Kingdom
- Branch: Territorial Army
- Type: Infantry Brigade
- Part of: 47th (1/2nd London) Division
- Garrison/HQ: Duke of York's Headquarters
- Engagements: First World War

The 142nd (6th London) Brigade (142 Bde) was an infantry brigade of the Territorial Army, part of the British Army, that served in the First and the Second World Wars, and remained in the United Kingdom throughout the latter.

== History ==
=== Origin ===
When the Territorial Force was created in 1908 under the Haldane Reforms, the existing Volunteer units in the London area were brought together into a new London Regiment and organised into two divisions with a full complement of infantry brigades and supporting arms. Four battalions from South London (formerly part of the Surrey Brigade) constituted the 6th London Brigade in 2nd London Division, with the following composition:

- 6th London Brigade Headquarters, Duke of York's Headquarters, Chelsea
- 21st (County of London) Battalion, London Regiment (1st Surrey Rifles), headquartered in Camberwell.
- 22nd (County of London) Battalion, London Regiment (The Queen's), headquartered in Bermondsey.
- 23rd (County of London) Battalion, London Regiment, headquartered in Clapham Junction.
- 24th (County of London) Battalion, London Regiment (The Queen's) headquartered in Kennington.
- No 4 (6th London Brigade) Company, 2nd London Divisional Train, Army Service Corps headquartered at the Duke of York's Headquarters

=== First World War ===
The outbreak of war on 4 August saw 6th London Brigade at Perham Down on Salisbury Plain, where it had just arrived for its annual training camp with the rest of 2nd London Division. They were immediately recalled to London to complete their mobilisation and by mid-August, 6 London Bde had reached its war station round Watford, Hertfordshire. The County of London Territorial Force Association immediately began raising '2nd Line' battalions, which quickly led to the formation of a duplicate 2/6th London Brigade (eventually 181st Brigade); consequently 6th London Brigade was renumbered 1/6th and its battalions were similarly prefixed (1/21st–1/24th).

In October 1914, 2nd London Division was selected for service on the Western Front and progressive training was carried out through the winter. The division embarked for France in March 1915, concentrating round Béthune. In May the division (already known in France simply as 'The London Division' to distinguish it from the Regular Army 2nd Division) took its place in the line and was designated 47th (1/2nd London) Division, with the brigades numbered consecutively: 6th London became 142nd (1/6th London) Brigade.

The division suffered casualties from shellfire while holding the line as neighbouring formations fought the Battle of Aubers Ridge, (9 & 15 May), but Heathcote-Drummond-Willoughby's 142 Bde carried out the division's first offensive action, on 25 May during the Battle of Festubert. The attack on the 'S' Bend was timed for 18.30, to precede a Canadian night attack further along the line. The 23rd and 24th Londons swept across the open ground and immediately captured the German front trenches with few losses. However, German listening posts had given warning of the impending attack, and they had registered their artillery onto their own trenches. The divisional historian records that the Londoners now encountered 'a fierce and deadly enfilading fire from the German guns, and particularly from a heavy battery posted near Auchy-les-la Bassée, far to the south and out of range of the guns of our Division'.

The brigade supports, 21st Londons, and the 20th Londons from divisional reserve, were brought up and desperate attempts made to extend the brigade's gains, 'but tremendous losses were suffered by the men crowded in the captured trenches. Nothing could be done to keep down this enfilading fire, and by the following morning much of the captured trenches had been knocked to bits and had to be abandoned, but a considerable part of their front line was retained and taken into our own trench system'.

==== Actions ====
The brigade was engaged in the following further operations:

1915

- Battle of Loos 25 September – 1 October
- Battle of the Hohenzollern Redoubt 13–19 October

1916

- Vimy Ridge 21 May
- Battle of the Somme:
  - Battle of Flers-Courcelette 15–19 September
  - Capture of High Wood 15 September
  - Battle of the Transloy Ridges 1–9 October
  - Capture of Eaucourt l'Abbaye 1–3 October
  - Attacks on the Butte de Warlencourt 7–8 October

1917

- Battle of Messines 7–13 June
- 3rd Battle of Ypres:
  - Battle of Pilckem Ridge] (in reserve) 31 July – 2 August)
  - In the line 18 August – 2 September and 8–17 September
- Battle of Cambrai:
  - Capture of Bourlon Wood 28 November
  - German counter-attacks 30 November – 3 December

1918

- 1st Battles of the Somme:
  - Battle of St Quentin 21–23 March
  - 1st Battle of Bapaume 24–25 March
  - Battle of the Ancre 5 April
- 2nd Battles of the Somme:
  - Battle of Albert 22–23 August
  - 2nd Battle of Bapaume 31 August – 3 September
- Final Advance in Artois:
  - Operations in Artois 2 October – 11 November
  - Official Entry into Lille 28 October

==== First World War order of battle ====
There were few changes to the brigade's Order of Battle during the war:

- 142nd Light Trench Mortar Battery formed June 1915
- 6th London Company ASC became 458th (Horse Transport) Company ASC in August 1915
- 1/3rd (City of London) Battalion, London Regiment (Royal Fusiliers) attached 16 November 1915; part ran a divisional draft training school, the remainder attached to 1/23rd Bn; transferred to 167th (1st London) Brigade in 56th (1st London) Division 9 February 1916)
- 142nd Machine Gun Company, Machine Gun Corps (formed December 1915 merged into 47th Battalion, Machine Gun Corps February 1918)
- 1/21st Battalion, transferred to 140th (4th London) Brigade when infantry brigades on the Western front were reduced to a three-battalion establishment in February 1918.

After the Armistice with Germany, 47th Division was engaged in railway repair and then settled down around Béthune (where it had started the war) to await demobilisation. This began in January, and the last troops left France on 10 May 1919. The brigade was demobilised at Felixstowe in May–June 1919.

=== Interwar years ===
47th Division and its subformations began to reform in the redesignated Territorial Army in 1920. 142 Bde was reformed with its original battalions, and with brigade HQ at the Regimental Headquarters of the Welsh Guards at Wellington Barracks in Birdcage Walk.

In the 1930s, reorganisation of the TA saw the brigade's traditional battalions being retasked (the 21st became 35th (1st Surrey Rifles) Anti-Aircraft Battalion, RE (TA) and the 23rd became 42nd Royal Tank Regiment in 1935, 22nd and 24th became 6th (Bermondsey) and 7th (Southwark) battalions of the Queen's Royal Regiment (West Surrey), transferred to 131st (Surrey) Infantry Brigade) and posted away. The brigade was disbanded in 1936.

=== Second World War ===
The rapid expansion of the TA after the Munich Crisis saw 6th London Brigade re-formed in April 1939 as a Second Line TA formation within a new 2nd London Division. It consisted of battalions of the Middlesex Regiment organised in the machine gun role:

- 1st Battalion, Princess Louise's Kensington Regiment (Middlesex Regiment) (left to join British Expeditionary Force in France 19 November 1939)
- 2nd Battalion, Princess Louise's Kensington Regiment (Middlesex Regiment)
- 2/7th Battalion, Middlesex Regiment (joined 7 October 1939, left 31 March 1940)
- 1/8th Battalion, Middlesex Regiment (joined 7 October, left 25 November 1939)
- 2/8th Battalion, Middlesex Regiment (joined 7 October 1939)

As its units were progressively posted away, the reduced brigade first came under the command of the brigadier of 3rd London Brigade, and was then disbanded on 4 May 1940. Neither the 6th London nor 142 Brigade titles was reactivated.

== Commanders ==
142 Brigade was commanded by the following officers:

- Brevet Colonel D.A. Kinloch (1911)
- Brig.-Gen. Hon. C.S. Heathcote-Drummond-Willoughby (from 11 April 1912; went sick 10 June 1915)
- Lt-Col W.G. Simpson (acting 10 June – 14 August 1915)
- Brig.-Gen. F.G. Lewis (14 August 1915 – 26 December 1916)
- Lt-Col H.B.P.I. Kennedy (acting 26 December 1916 – 5 February 1917)
- Brig.-Gen.V.T. Bailey (from 5 February 1917; wounded and captured 24 March 1918)
- Brig.-Gen. R. McDouall (3 April – 11 December 1918)
- Brig.-Gen. L.F. Ashburner (11 December 1918 until demobilisation)
- Col. R.E.K. Leatham, Welsh Guards (1932)
- Brig. R.B.S. Reford (1939 to 15 March 1940)
- Brig. H.V. Combe (Commander of 3rd London Brigade, combined roles 15 March – 4 May 1940)

== Bibliography ==
- A.F. Becke,History of the Great War: Order of Battle of Divisions, Part 2a: The Territorial Force Mounted Divisions and the 1st-Line Territorial Force Divisions (42–56), London: HM Stationery Office, 1935/Uckfield: Naval & Military Press, 2007, ISBN 1-84734-739-8.
- A.F. Becke,History of the Great War: Order of Battle of Divisions, Part 2b: The 2nd-Line Territorial Force Divisions (57th–69th), with the Home-Service Divisions (71st–73rd) and 74th and 75th Divisions, London: HM Stationery Office, 1937/Uckfield: Naval & Military Press, 2007, ISBN 1-84734-739-8.
- Alan H. Maude (ed.), The History of the 47th (London) Division 1914–1919, London: Amalgamated Press, 1922/Uckfield: Naval & Military Press, 2002, ISBN 1-84342-205-0.

== External sources ==
- The Long, Long Trail
- The Regimental Warpath 1914–1918
- British Army 1914
- Land Forces of Britain, the Empire and Commonwealth
- British Military History
