= Lützow's Wild Hunt =

Lützow's Wild Hunt may mean:

- Lützow's Wild Hunt (film), a 1927 German silent film directed by Richard Oswald
- Lützow's Wild Hunt (poem), by German poet and soldier Theodor Körner
