= Braganza Street drill hall =

Military installation in London, England

- Kennington, London
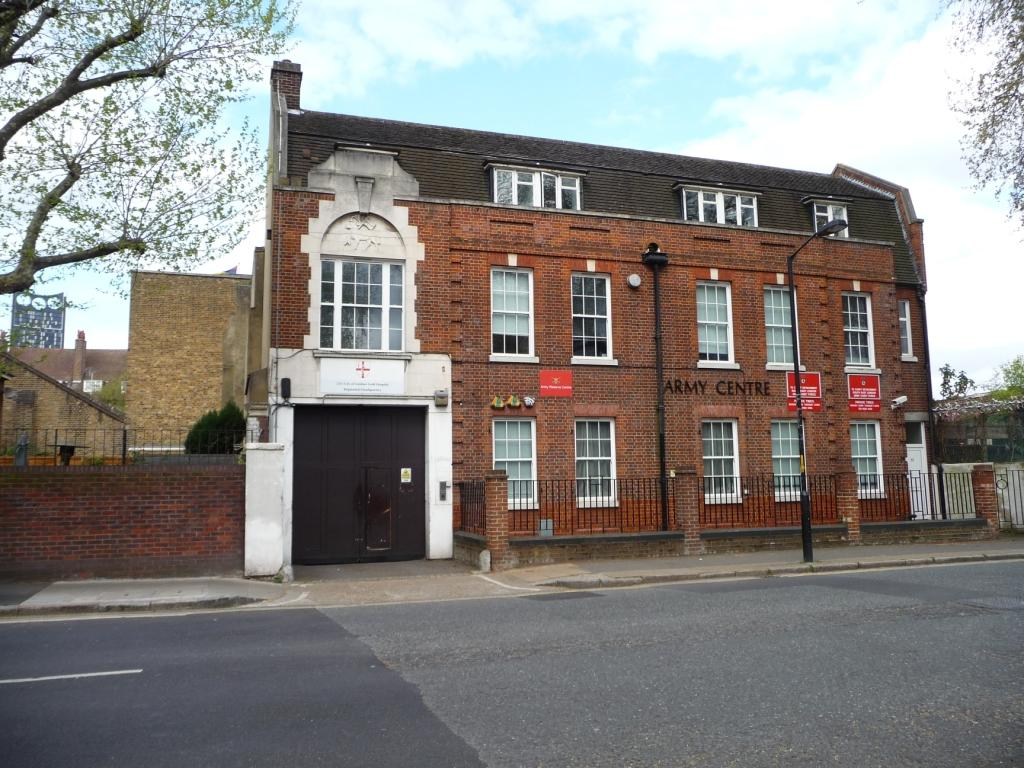
- Braganza Street drill hall

Site information
- Type: Drill Hall

Location
- Location within London
- Coordinates: 51.48748°N 0.10278°W

Site history
- Built: 1865
- Built for: War Office
- In use: 1865-Present

The Braganza Street drill hall is a military installation in Braganza Street, Walworth.

== History ==
The building originates from a pair of houses built in what was then known as New Street in 1833 and which were acquired by the 19th Surrey Rifle Volunteer Corps in 1865. The 19th Surrey Rifle Volunteer Corps evolved to become the 4th Volunteer Battalion, Queen's (Royal West Surrey Regiment) in 1883 and the 24th (County of London) Battalion (The Queen’s) in 1908. The battalion was mobilised at the drill hall in August 1914 before being deployed to the Western Front. When the London Regiment was broken up in 1937, the battalion became the 7th (Southwark) Battalion, the Queen's Royal Regiment (West Surrey). The drill hall, in what was by then known as Braganza Street, was substantially re-built at that time and the enlarged facility was opened by the Duke of Gloucester in 1938.

After the war the battalion converted to artillery and, in 1947, became the 622nd Heavy Anti-Aircraft Regiment, Royal Artillery. After the Royal Artillery went through a re-organisation and vacated the hall, a new field hospital, 217 (London) General Hospital Royal Army Medical Corps, was formed at the Braganza Street drill hall in 1967. That unit amalgamated with other field hospitals in 1995 to form 256 (City of London) Field Hospital.

== Current units ==
The drill hall is now home to:

256 (City of London & South East) Multi-Role Medical Regiment

- Regimental Headquarters (RHQ)
- 257 Support Squadron
- 217 Hospital Squadron
