= 1st Surrey Rifles =

First Surrey Rifles
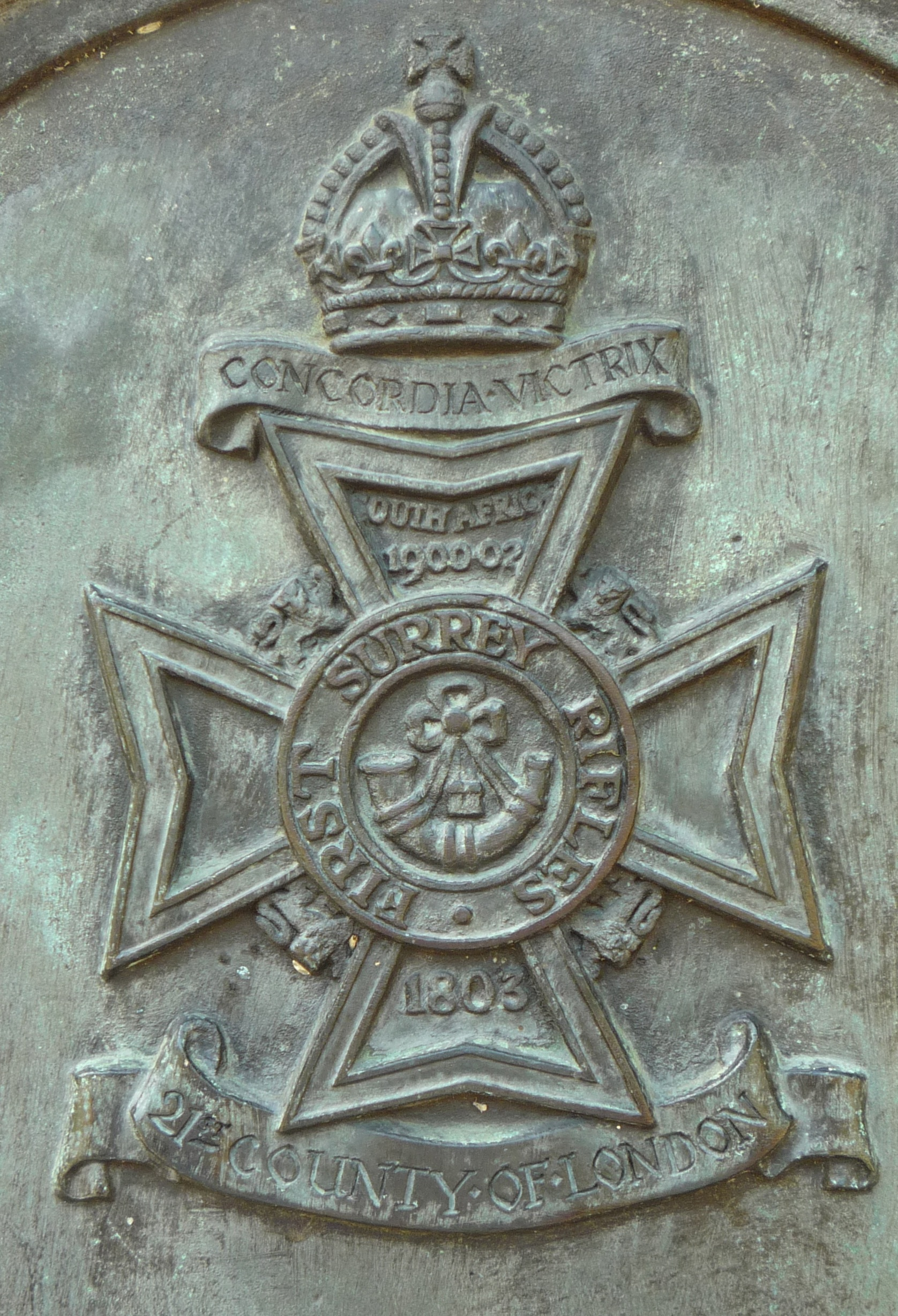
- Active: 14 June 1859–1993
- Country: United Kingdom
- Branch: Territorial Army
- Type: Infantry Battalion; Searchlight Regiment; Light Anti-Aircraft Regiment
- Role: Infantry 1859–1935, 1975–1993; Air Defence 1935–1975
- Garrison/HQ: Camberwell
- Motto: Concordia Victrix
- March: Lutzow's Wild Hunt
- Engagements: Western Front; Salonika; Palestine; The Blitz; Operation Diver

The 1st Surrey Rifles (often spelled out in full as First Surrey Rifles and abbreviated as FSR) was a volunteer unit of the British Army from 1859 until 1993. It saw considerable service on the Western Front, at Salonika and in Palestine during World War I. It served as a searchlight unit and as a light anti-aircraft regiment during World War II.

== Origins ==
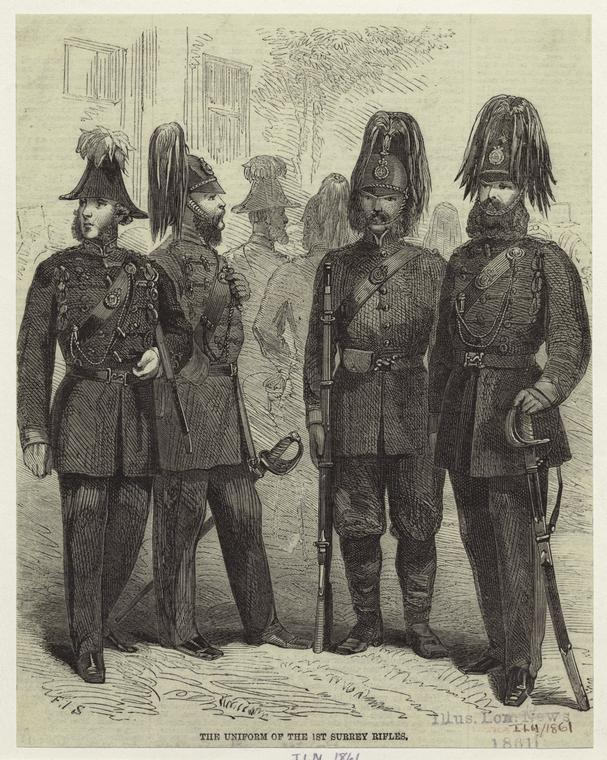
Personnel of the 1st Surrey Rifles in uniform, from an 1861 drawing

An invasion scare in 1859 led to the creation of the Volunteer Force and huge enthusiasm for joining local Rifle Volunteer Corps (RVCs). The 1st Surrey RVC or South London Rifles was one of the first such units formed, being based on the existing Peckham Rifle Club and recruiting many other members from the Hanover Sports Club at Peckham. The first officers were commissioned into the unit on 14 June 1859, and the headquarters was established in Camberwell. The following year it absorbed the 3rd Surrey RVC (first commissions 26 August 1859), also based at Camberwell, which became No 2 Company. The 1st Surrey RVC was active in trying to take over other South London groups: in November 1859 it made an unsuccessful approach to a new sub-unit formed in Putney (which actually joined the 9th Surrey RVC in Richmond). By the end of 1860 the strength of the 1st Surrey (South London) RVC was eight companies, recruited across Camberwell, Peckham and Clapham, under the command of Lt-Col John Boucher, formerly of the 5th Dragoon Guards. In 1865 they opened a new headquarters and drill hall in Camberwell. The uniform was Rifle green with red facings. An affiliated Cadet Corps was formed at Dulwich College in 1878.

Following the Childers Reforms, the 1st Surrey RVC became the 1st Volunteer Battalion of the East Surrey Regiment on 1 July 1881, but without changing its title. Under the Stanhope Memorandum of December 1888, the battalion was assigned to the Surrey Volunteer Infantry Brigade, whose place of assembly in case of war was at Caterham to man the outer London Defence Positions. By 1907, the brigade had been split into separate East and West Surrey brigades, the 1st Surrey Rifles forming part of the East Surrey Brigade based at Worplesdon. Volunteers from the unit served in the 2nd Boer War, earning the battle honour South Africa 1900–02.

== Territorial Force ==
Under the Haldane Reforms, the former Volunteers were subsumed into the Territorial Force (TF) in 1908. The newly created London Regiment consisted entirely of TF infantry battalions, with no Regular component. The 1st Surreys' recruiting area of South London had been incorporated into the new County of London since 1889, and so it became the 21st (County of London) Battalion, The London Regiment (1st Surrey Rifles) (TF) and formed part of 6th London Brigade in the 2nd London Division. Its headquarters and all eight companies were located at Flodden Road, off Camberwell New Road.

== World War I ==
=== Mobilisation ===
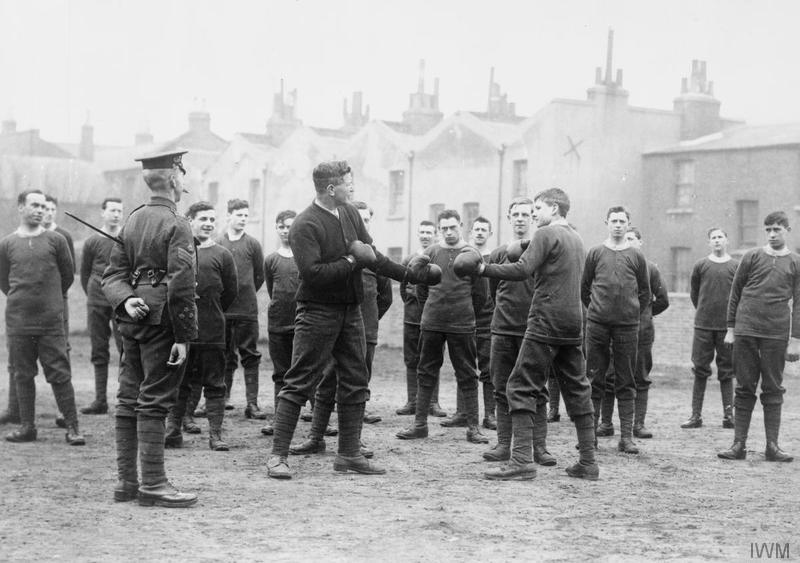
LCpl Pat O'Keeffe spars with a private of the 21st (County of London) Battalion, London Regiment (First Surrey Rifles) in Camberwell, London, in 1914 (IWM Q53492)

The battalion had just arrived at Perham Down on Salisbury Plain on 2 August 1914 for its annual training when the order to mobilise was received, and it immediately returned to Camberwell. Within four days, sufficient volunteers had been recruited to bring it up to full strength, and the battalion marched to billets in St Albans for intensive training. A few officers were left at Flodden Road to form the nucleus of a reserve battalion, which was fully recruited before the end of September. The two battalions were later designated 1/21st and 2/21st Londons.

=== 1/21st Londons ===
The 2nd London Division (soon to be numbered 47th Division) was sent to reinforce the British Expeditionary Force on the Western Front in March 1915. The 1/21st Bn disembarked at Le Havre on 16 March and first went into the trenches on the evening of 2 April near Béthune, the four companies being distributed among the four battalions of 1st (Guards) Brigade for initiation into trench warfare. Later that month the division took over its own section of line, the 1/21st being in front of Festubert.

==== Festubert ====
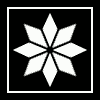
47th (1/2nd London) Divisional sign

The Battle of Festubert began on 15 May and, on 25 May, the 47th Division extended the British offensive by launching an attack from Givenchy just north of the La Bassée Canal. 6th London Brigade (now entitled 142nd (1/6th London) Bde), was chosen to make the attack on a two-battalion front by the 1/23rd and 1/24th Londons, with the 1/21st in support. The brigade was harassed by artillery and machine-gun fire (during the Battle of Aubers) in the days before the attack, which went in at 18.30 on the 25th, against German trenches known as the 'S' Bend. The leading battalions swept across No-Man's Land with comparatively small losses, but once in the German front-line trench came under fierce enfilading fire from German guns that had pre-registered their own trenches. The lead companies of the First Surreys (B and D), waiting in the British front trenches, were also heavily shelled, and then met with intense small-arms fire when they crossed No-Man's Land to support the attack. They then had to put the captured trenches into a defensible state to ward off counter-attacks, while A and C companies brought up supplies, evacuated wounded, and dug a communication trench from the old front line during the night. Daybreak on 26 May revealed that the left flank of the battalion was 'in the air', with a party of Germans behind it still inflicting casualties. It took all day to fortify this flank and build up parapets that could be handed over to the relieving battalion that night. The First Surreys lost two officers and 32 NCOs and men killed in this action, and three officers and 120 NCOs wounded, and won the battle honour Festubert 1915.

==== Loos ====
After rest and reorganisation, the First Surreys returned to frontline duty in June 1915, holding relatively quiet sectors for the next three months while mentoring the Kitchener's Army men of 15th (Scottish) Division. The First Surrey's Regular Army adjutant, Capt H.B.P.L. Kennedy, was promoted to command the battalion. In late September, preparations began for the Battle of Loos, in which 47th Division was to play a major part. 142 Brigade's role was to provide a firm flank to the division's attack, and distract the enemy's attention with dummy figures in No-Man's Land. The attack started on 25 September and, on the night of 28 September, 142 Bde went up to relieve the division's leading brigade, the First Surreys taking up positions among the coal mine workings of Loos. For the rest of the winter, the battalion was rotated through the dangerous defences in the area around Lone Tree and the Hohenzollern redoubt.

==== Vimy ====
In Spring 1916, the division was moved to the Vimy Ridge sector near Arras. This was quiet to begin with, but in April intensive mining operations were begun by both sides, and on 20 May the Germans attacked and took some ground from the division. The 1/21st and 1/24th Bns counter-attacked on the evening of 23 May. The 1/24th was held up, but A Company of the First Surreys went ahead and recaptured the old line, holding it for about an hour and causing heavy casualties to the enemy. However, they were unsupported by flanking forces and were compelled to return: 'Nothing was left to show for this gallant and costly action beyond a few yards of our old front line'. To hold its position against German counter-attack at the end of the action, the battalion had to be reinforced by a company of the 1/22nd Londons, by the divisional engineers and pioneers and by the tunnelling companies. The First Surreys suffered 187 casualties of all ranks in this action.

==== High Wood ====
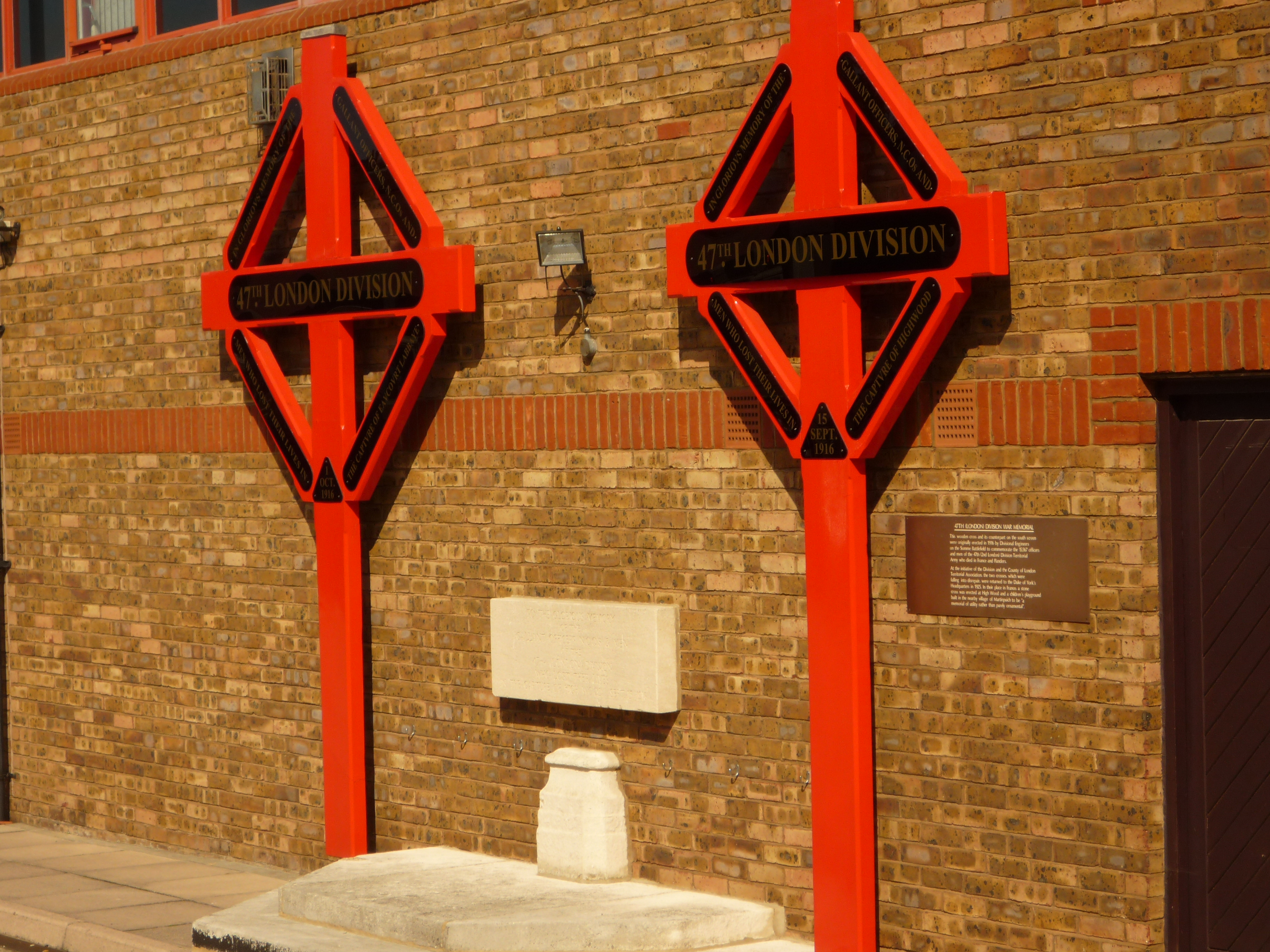
The two wooden memorial crosses were originally erected at High Wood and Eaucourt l'Abbaye by 47 Divisional Engineers in 1916.

The First Surreys were relieved on 27 July and marched south to take part in the Somme offensive. On arrival, the battalion underwent intense training, before going into the line near High Wood on 10 September. On 15 September, as part of the Battle of Flers-Courcelette, 47th Division attacked to complete the capture of High Wood, with 142 Bde in reserve. The First Surreys moved into Mametz Wood at 06.30 to be close to the fighting line, and at noon were released to 140 Bde. At 15.30, the battalion was ordered to capture a length of enemy-held trench (the 'Starfish Line') that lay between 140 and 141 Bdes. All went well until the leading platoons topped the ridge east of High Wood, when they came within view of the enemy's guns. Whole platoons were wiped out by direct hits, but the others carried on until they were able to make a determined assault on the trench. The 'Starfish Redoubt' was carried and connection made with the remnants of 140 Bde, but the losses made it impossible to continue to take the second objective (the 'Cough Drop'). Of the 19 officers and 550 men who had gone into the attack, only 2 officers and 60 men remained, the rest being dead or wounded.

The battalion was pulled out the following morning and marched back to collect a draft of 300 inexperienced men from the 2/5th East Surreys (from 67th (2nd Home Counties) Division in England). By 27 September, the First Surreys were back at High Wood in reserve. On 8 October they attacked again, in an attempt to capture 'Diagonal Trench' near Eaucourt l'Abbaye and the Butte de Warlencourt. The attack was meant to be a surprise after a 1-minute hurricane bombardment, but the troops could make only 2–300 yards, still some 200 yards short of the objective, before they were compelled to dig in and form a chain of outposts. The exhausted 47th Division was relieved the following day and sent to the Ypres Salient for the winter.

==== Messines ====
The First Surreys went into the line near the much fought-over Hill 60, now a quiet sector used by both sides to rest exhausted divisions. It was not until May 1917 that the battalion began training for a new attack at Messines. Assisted by a series of large mines (including one under Hill 60), the pre-dawn assault at Messines was highly successful. The First Surreys, in support for 142 Bde, moved forward and by 06.15 were in their jumping-off position in the newly captured trenches. A and C Companies advanced and took 'Oaf Line', the German support line, after which they were to seize the spoil bank thrown up from canal construction, then wheel right and cross the canal. B and D Companies jumped off towards the spoil bank at 07.30, but the unit to their left was held up in 'Battle Wood', from which enemy machine-guns enfiladed the battalion as it advanced. Only a foothold could be gained on the spoil bank, so the divisional commander withdrew the troops and ordered a fresh bombardment of the position from 14.00 to 19.00. Reinforced, the First Surreys were due to renew the assault when the Germans put down an intense barrage, rendering attack impossible. The following day the battalion had to fend off several German counter-attacks. At Messines – generally considered a successful battle – the battalion's casualties were seven officers and 237 other ranks killed and wounded.

After rest, the battalion went back into the front line on 1 July, and held the line or was in support until 25 July. Although this was a quiet period, the First Surreys were among the first units to experience the new German Mustard gas, which caused significant casualties. Even in camp in July and August, the battalion suffered from long-range shelling and night bombing. losing a steady trickle of key personnel. The 47th Division next went to the Arras front, where it held the Gavrelle and Oppy Wood sectors until late November, when it was sent to take over ground captured during the recent Battle of Cambrai.

==== Bourlon Wood ====
The division took over the Bourlon Wood sector on the night of 28/29 November, and was bombarded with mustard gas. On 30 November the Germans made a heavy counter-attack against the sketchy trenches. On the night of 1 December, the First Surreys moved out of divisional reserve to relieve the battered Civil Service Rifles (1/15th Londons) in their isolated forward trenches. Despite gas and high explosive shelling, the battalion held the position until the division was withdrawn from the dangerous salient four days later. However, the Germans kept up the pressure on the new line, and on 9 December the First Surreys had to counter-attack to relieve a party of 1/23rd Bn in 'Durrant's Post', after which the line was withdrawn further.

==== Spring 1918 ====
The heavy casualties suffered by the BEF necessitated a major reorganisation in early 1918. On 1 February, 1/21st Bn was transferred within the division to 140 Bde, where it came under the command of its former CO, now Brig-Gen H.B.P.L. Kennedy. At the same time it received a draft from the disbanded 2/11th London Regiment (Finsbury Rifles) in 58th (2/1st London) Division.

The German spring offensive opened on 21 March. The First Surreys had just taken over the 'Welsh Ridge' section of the front at Villers-Plouich, with two companies holding a chain of outposts rather than a continuous trench. After a heavy bombardment and a day of skirmishing with German probes, the battalion was ordered to fall back to 'Highland Ridge' after dark. The following day the battalion's Lewis gun teams fought a delaying action from Welsh Ridge to Highland Ridge. The main German breakthrough had been to the south, and over the next few days the whole division had to fall back because of pressure from this flank. The First Surreys now got separated, part retiring with the rest of the brigade, the remainder with battalion HQ and details of other battalions digging in at Four Winds aerodrome at Lechelle. Later, Brig-Gen Kennedy, organising a mixed force from 47th and 2nd Division had two FSR companies under his command, while battalion HQ and the other companies were part of another mixed force holding the brigade's front line. These outposts were slowly pushed in as the enemy infiltrated between them, and it was not until the evening of 24 March that the battalion was once more concentrated, at Bazentin Wood on the old Somme battlefield. On 25 March the battalion occupied an old trench and caused heavy casualties to German troops pushing past in the direction of Pozieres. Towards evening the enemy infiltration forced the brigade back once more. On 26 March the battalion retired across the River Ancre past fresh troops and ceased to be in the front line. For the next few days the First Surreys were engaged in digging defences, coming under heavy bombardment on 4 April when the rest of 47th Division was attacked once more. The battalion was finally relieved on 8 April.

For the rest of the month, the First Surreys were able to rest, refit, and train, absorbing drafts from the UK. Duties in May and June were light, then in July the battalion began to carry out the usual tours of duty in the front line, including introducing US troops to the trenches.

==== The Hundred Days ====
The Allies had begun a new offensive at Amiens on 8 August, and the First Surreys joined this at the Battle of Albert. 47th Division attacked on 22 August from the old Amiens defences towards an objective called the Green Line, on the high ground east of 'Happy Valley'. 140th Brigade was in support, intended to exploit any success in conjunction with Whippet tanks and the cavalry of the Northumberland Hussars. However, the division's leading brigades encountered stiffer than expected opposition, the tanks and cavalry were unable to get through, and the Green Line was not reached. 140th Brigade therefore made a fresh attack on the night at 01.00 on 24 August. This surprise night attack was a complete success, the regimental historian reporting that 'In brilliant moonlight, and with a splendid barrage, we went over, and were almost immediately in the trenches which formed our objective'. However, the battalion's left-hand company was severely shot up by a German strongpoint that the neighbouring division had failed to capture. The following afternoon the strongpoint was finally suppressed by tanks. The following night the battalion renewed the advance behind a creeping barrage, gaining two miles with almost no opposition.

After three days' refitting, the division rejoined what had now become a war of movement against German rearguards. The First Surreys had a tough fight to take Moislans trench on 2 September, even though they were officially following up in support, because the attacking forces were also badly thinned – 1/21st Bn itself could only put 100 men into the battle. By now, 47 Division was in need of reinforcements that were not forthcoming; after calling up detached working parties, the First Surreys provided a composite company of 150 men for the operations of 6–7 September, after which the division was pulled out of the offensive.

The First Surreys were warned to prepare for a move to the Italian Front, but this never happened because of shortage of railway rolling stock. Instead, the battalion spent a period holding a quiet sector of the line, and then took part in 47th Division's ceremonial entry into the liberated city of Lille on 28 October. After a halt on the Scheldt, the battalion had advanced past the evacuated city of Tournai when the Armistice with Germany came into force on 11 November.

==== Demobilisation ====
Immediately after the Armistice, the First Surreys were engaged in repairing the Tournai–Ath railway, and then went into winter quarters in the mining village of Auchel, near Béthune to await demobilisation. Men began to be demobilised in January 1919, and by 4 May the remaining cadre of the battalion entrained for the UK, for an official welcome at Camberwell and a final march-past to Buckingham Palace by London troops on 5 July. The battalion was demobilised on 25 July.

==== Commanding Officers ====
The following officers commanded the 1/21st Bn during World War I:

- Lt-Col M. J. B. Tomlin, to 1 May 1915
- Lt-Col W .F. Morris, to 31 August 1915
- Lt-Col H. B. P. L. Kennedy, to 17 May 1917
- Lt-Col A. Hutchence, to 30 September 1917
- Maj C. W. B. Heslop, to October 1917
- Lt-Col G. Dawes, to November 1918
- Lt-Col W. G. Newton, to demobilisation.

=== 2/21st Londons ===
The 2/21st Battalion was formed on 31 August 1914 began its training in September at Flodden Road, at Ruskin Park and on Wimbledon Common, with a few rifles borrowed from the affiliated cadet corps at Dulwich College. Meanwhile, the men continued to live at home and wore civilian clothes until uniforms gradually became available. In January 1915 the battalion joined 2/6th London Brigade in billets at Redhill, Surrey, where training included digging trenches at Merstham Hill as part of the London Southern Defence Scheme. During February, .256-in Japanese Ariska rifles were issued. By March the 2/2nd London Division was sent to the St Albans area to replace 1/2nd London Division in Third Army, Central Force, and provided drafts to bring the 1st-Line units up to strength for overseas service. The men who had only signed up for Home Service became the nucleus of the 3/21st Bn forming at Flodden Road. The 2/21st was billeted first at St Albans, then at Sawbridgeworth. After camping during the summer, it spent the winter of 1915–16 billeted at Coggeshall.

In November, the division received .303 Lee–Enfield service rifles in place of the Japanese weapons, and towards the end of January 1916 (now officially the 60th (2/2nd London) Division) it moved to Sutton Veny on Salisbury Plain for final training before proceeding overseas. The 2/21st in 181st (2/6th London) Brigade was brought up to full strength with a draft of recruits (and some Home Service men now obliged by the Military Service Act 1916 to undertake overseas service) from the 3/21st. The battalion crossed to France on 24/25 June.

==== Western Front ====
The 60th Division was due to relieve the 51st (Highland) Division in the line near Vimy, and the fresh troops of the 2/21st were introduced to their duties by the 4th Bn Seaforth Highlanders and 9th Bn Royal Scots. The battalion took over its own sector on 16 July. Mining, crater-fighting and trench-raiding were constant on this front, but the battalion's first disastrous trench raid on the night of 15 September dampened its enthusiasm.

==== Salonika ====
60th Division was intended to join the Somme offensive in October 1916, but instead was switched to the Macedonian front. The 2/21st was relieved on 25 October and disembarked at Salonika on 8 December. On 17 January 1917, after a rough march up-country, it took over a section of the line at 'Dover Tepe' (Dova Tepe), which it held for six weeks, carrying out one night raid against Bulgarian outposts, but generally more concerned with the bad weather than the enemy. At the end of March, 181 Bde moved to join the rest of the division in the Vardar sector. This was a totally static area during the battalion's stay, apart from one patrol action. During 16–18 June the battalion re-embarked at Salonika for Egypt to join the Palestine Campaign.

==== Palestine ====
After landing at Alexandria, 60th Division moved to the Suez Canal to join the Egyptian Expeditionary Force (EEF), where its units were re-equipped and underwent training before crossing Sinai in early July 1917. Further intensive training followed until late October, when the division made its first full-scale attack of the war, at Beersheba. After a silent approach march during the night of 30/31 October, the division bombarded and then attacked Hill 1070, a prominent feature in front of the Turkish main defences. 181st Brigade advanced on the left at 08.30, with 2/21st in close support, and the position was taken at the double within 10 minutes. 2/21st Battalion lost a few casualties to enemy shellfire while waiting, but none in the attack. The guns then moved up to bombard the Turkish main line, and at 12.15, 181 Bde went forward again with 2/21st in the centre, capturing their objectives without a hitch and forming an outpost line. That evening the town of Beersheba fell to the Desert Mounted Corps.

On the night of 5/6 November, the 2/21st was ordered to send out two companies to get in touch with 74th (Yeomanry) Division who were due to attack Sheria; this entailed an advance in the dark with inadequate maps, but before dawn C & D Companies had established an outpost line at Wadi Sheria, from which they were able to enfilade the enemy when the attack began at dawn. A Turkish counter-attack was broken up with rifle and machine-gun fire, and later a cavalry brigade of the EEF passed through to complete the victory.

After the fall of Sheria, the division advanced to Nebi Samwil, a strong position in front of Jerusalem, against which the Turks sent a series of counter-attacks. Despite coming under sporadic bombardment, 2/21st Battalion was not seriously engaged during the days it spent in this position. On 9 December the battalion was marching towards Jerusalem, engaging the Turks in the western outskirts and suffering several casualties while clearing the last ridge with the bayonet. On 13 December B & D Companies made a surprise attack on a Turkish position known as 'Tower Hill', after which C Company came up and drove off a counter-attack.

After the surrender of Jerusalem, all the battalions of the 60th Division had a short spell in billets out of the foul weather, but on 24 December intelligence was received of a Turkish counter-attack from the Jericho direction and the division deployed outside the city on 26 December, with 2/21st at Beit Hannina supporting 181 Bde. The following day the attack developed along the whole line, and 2/24th Londons were hard pressed, being relieved by the 2/21st during the afternoon. The attacks petered out at dusk and next day the British advance up the Nablus road was resumed. On 3 January, A, B and C Companies successfully attacked Hill 2635 at dawn; two days later the 60th Division was relieved and went into defensive positions around Jerusalem.

On 31 January, the battalion made a successful reconnaissance of Mukhmas, and on 14 February it attacked and seized the position, followed by 'Round Hill' This was a preliminary to the division's advance on Jericho, which began on the night of 18/19 February. The next night, 2/21st were leading 181 Bde on the right, advancing slowly through rugged ground and Turkish rearguards. By the morning of 21 February the division was on the heights overlooking Jericho, which was secured by the 3rd Australian Light Horse.

The 60th Division next took part in the First Transjordan Raid. Swimmers of the 2/21st attempted to cross the River Jordan on the night of 21 March, but failed; however, the 2/19th succeeded upstream, the Turkish defenders retreated and Pontoon bridges were thrown over the river. The 2/21st crossed in daylight, and advanced towards the Moab hills. The following day a set-piece attack was made on the positions in these hills, and the route towards Es Salt and Amman cleared. The attack on Amman began on 28 March, the 2/21st on the right advancing against the deep and difficult obstacle of Wadi Amman. The attack was made over 1,000 yards of open terrain and was held up by small arms and artillery fire. A further attack made at 02.00 on the night of 29/30 March failed at 'The Citadel', with heavy casualties. The troops were exhausted – at one scheduled 10-minute rest, the entire 2/21st fell asleep for an hour – and the raid was abandoned. The troops retired back over the Jordan by 2 April. The 2/21st had suffered 215 killed, wounded and missing in this operation, all the officers of B and C Companies becoming casualties.

==== Disbandment ====
Although the 2/21st took part in the Second Transjordan Raid (30 April – 4 May), it did not see any action. By now the battalion was very weak in numbers and no reinforcements were forthcoming from Europe; indeed, after the German Spring Offensive the BEF required reinforcements from the EEF. The 60th Division was reorganised as an Indian Army formation and sent most of its British troops to the Western Front. The 2/21st, however, was disbanded on 3 June 1918, and its men were drafted to the three remaining London battalions of the division: 2/13th, 2/19th and 2/22nd.

==== Commanding Officers ====
The following officers commanded the 2/21st Bn:

- Col Coldicott (September 1914 – late 1915)
- Lt-Col B. Fletcher (late 1915 – July 1916)
- Lt-Col F. D. Watney (Queen's Regiment) (July 1916 – May 1917, October 1917)
- Lt-Col Gibson (Northumberland Fusiliers) (May–October 1917)
- Lt-Col J. A. Jervois (King's Own Yorkshire Light Infantry) (October 1917–disbandment)

=== 3/21st Londons ===
The 3/21st Bn was formed in March 1915 and went to Tadworth in Surrey for training, moving to Winchester in January 1916. On 8 April 1916 the 3/21st was redesignated 21st Reserve Bn as part of the 2nd London Reserve Group (later 2nd London Reserve Brigade). It absorbed the 23rd Reserve Bn (former 3/23rd) in September 1916. In November 1917 it moved to Chiseldon Camp in Wiltshire and then to Benacre Park in Suffolk in 1918. It was disbanded on 11 September 1919 at Hunstanton.

=== 31st Londons ===
The remaining Home Service men of the TF were separated when the 3rd Line battalions were raised in May 1915, and were formed into Provisional Battalions for home defence. The men of the First Surrey Rifles joined with those from the 17th (Poplar & Stepney Rifles) and 18th (London Irish Rifles) Battalions of the London Regiment to form 107th Provisional Battalion (Territorial Force) at Frinton-on-Sea in Essex. It joined 7th Provisional Brigade in the defences of East Anglia.

The Military Service Act 1916 swept away the Home/Foreign service distinction, and all TF soldiers became liable for overseas service, if medically fit. The Provisional Brigades thus became anomalous, and their units became numbered battalions of their parent units. On 1 January 1917, 107th Provisional Bn absorbed 105th Provisional Bn (the former home service men of the 11th (Finsbury Rifles), 13th (Kensington), 14th (London Scottish) and 16th (Queen's Westminsters) Bns, London Regiment) to become 31st (County of London) Battalion, London Regiment, in 226th Mixed Bde, attached to 71st Division from 13 April 1917. By May 1917, the battalion was at St Osyth in Essex. Part of the role of the former provisional units was physical conditioning to render men fit for drafting overseas, and as men were drafted the 31st Londons was run down, and it was disbanded on 7 September 1917.

== Interwar ==
The TF reformed on 7 February 1920 and was reconstituted in 1921 as the Territorial Army (TA). The London Regiment had been abolished in 1916, so its battalions were designated as regiments in their own right, the FSR becoming 21st London Regiment (First Surrey Rifles), once again affiliated to the East Surreys and once again in 142nd (6th London) Brigade of 47th (2nd London) Division.

=== 35th (FSR) Anti-Aircraft Battalion ===
In 1935, the increasing need for anti-aircraft (AA) defence, particularly for London, was addressed by converting the 47th Division into the 1st Anti-Aircraft Division. A number of its infantry battalions were also converted to the AA role, the 21st Londons being transferred to the Royal Engineers (RE) as a searchlight unit on 15 December, becoming the 35th (1st Surrey Rifles) Anti Aircraft Battalion, RE (TA), with HQ and 340th–343rd AA Companies at Camberwell. Despite its transfer to the RE, the battalion continued to wear its First Surreys cap badge. The 35th AA Bn was initially assigned to 27th (Home Counties) Anti-Aircraft Brigade in 1 AA Division.

90 cm Projector Anti-Aircraft, displayed at Fort Nelson, Portsmouth

== World War II ==
=== 35th (FSR) Searchlight Regiment ===
==== Mobilisation ====
The TA's AA units were mobilised on 23 September 1938 during the Munich Crisis, with units manning their emergency positions within 24 hours, even though many did not yet have their full complement of men or equipment. The emergency lasted three weeks, and they were stood down on 13 October. In February 1939 the existing AA defences came under the control of a new Anti-Aircraft Command. In June a partial mobilisation of TA units was begun in a process known as 'couverture', whereby each AA unit did a month's tour of duty in rotation to man selected AA and searchlight positions. On 24 August, ahead of the declaration of war, AA Command was fully mobilised at its war stations. By the outbreak of war in September 1939, the battalion was part of 47th AA Brigade in a new 5th AA Division formed to cover Southern England.

==== Battle of Britain ====
In 1940, the battalion was transferred again to 38th Light AA Brigade back in 1 AA Division, defending London. In early May 1940, 342 AA Coy came under the operational control of 29th (Kent) AA Bn to thicken up the S/L distribution in Kent (29th AA Bn was in process of transferring from 29 (East Anglian) AA Bde to 27 (Home Counties) AA Bde in 5 AA Division).

On 1 August 1940, the RE's AA battalions were transferred to the Royal Artillery (RA) and were redesignated searchlight regiments, the FSR becoming 35th (First Surrey Rifles) Searchlight Regiment.

==== The Blitz ====
The S/L layouts had been based on a spacing of 3,500 yards (3,200 m), but due to equipment shortages this had been extended to 6,000 yards (5,500 m) by September 1940. In November, during The Blitz, this was changed to clusters of three lights to improve illumination, but this meant that the clusters had to be spaced 10,400 yards (9,500 m) apart. The cluster system was an attempt to improve the chances of picking up enemy bombers and keeping them illuminated for engagement by AA guns or Royal Air Force (RAF) Night fighters. Eventually, one light in each cluster was to be equipped with SLC radar and act as 'master light', but the radar equipment was still in short supply.

The regiment supplied a cadre of experienced officers and men to 230th S/L Training Rgt at Blandford Camp where it provided the basis for a new 521 S/L Bty formed on 14 November 1940. This battery later joined 85th S/L Rgt. At the end of the Blitz, in May 1941, 342 S/L Bty returned to 35th S/L Rgt.

By October 1941, the availability of SLC radar was sufficient to allow AA Command's S/Ls to be 'declustered' into single-light sites spaced at 10,400-yard intervals in 'Indicator Belts' along the coast and 'Killer Belts' at 6000-yard spacing inland to cooperate with the RAF's night fighters. By December 1941, the regiment was in 27 (Home Counties) AA Bde in 5 AA Division, covering Portsmouth. On 23 January 1942, 342 Bty was transferred to 79th S/L Rgt.

6 AA Divisional sign

=== 129th (FSR) Light Anti-Aircraft Regiment ===
In March 1942, the 35th (First Surrey Rifles) S/L Regt RA was reorganised as 129th Light Anti-Aircraft Regiment RA (First Surrey Rifles) (TA), with 425, 426, 427 LAA Btys equipped with LAA guns instead of searchlights. 455 LAA Battery joined on 19 May 1942 from 81st LAA Rgt. (Note: 455 LAA Battery had been formed on 19 February 1942 from the fourth Troops of 180, 181 and 187 LAA Btys of 60th LAA Rgt and was initially posted to 81st LAA Rgt.)

At first, the new regiment was unbrigaded; however, after training, it joined 28th (Thames & Medway) AA Bde in 6 AA Division in June 1942, covering North Kent and the Thames estuary. It was transferred to 71 AA Bde in September (except 427 LAA Bty, which remained attached to 28 AA Bde). Both brigades were in 6 AA Division, which was absorbed into a larger 2 AA Group on 1 October. In early December, 129th (FSR) LAA Rgt was transferred again within 2 AA Group to 6 AA Brigade, which covered RAF airfields in East Anglia.

On 1 May 1943, 6 AA Bde was redesignated 102 AA Bde and transferred from AA Command to the GHQ Reserve. 129th (FSR) LAA Regiment remained with 2 AA Group, transferring to 56 Light AA Bde and then back to 47 AA Bde by the summer, before becoming unbrigaded in September. By March 1944 it had joined 40 AA Bde in 2 AA Group.

==== Operation Diver ====
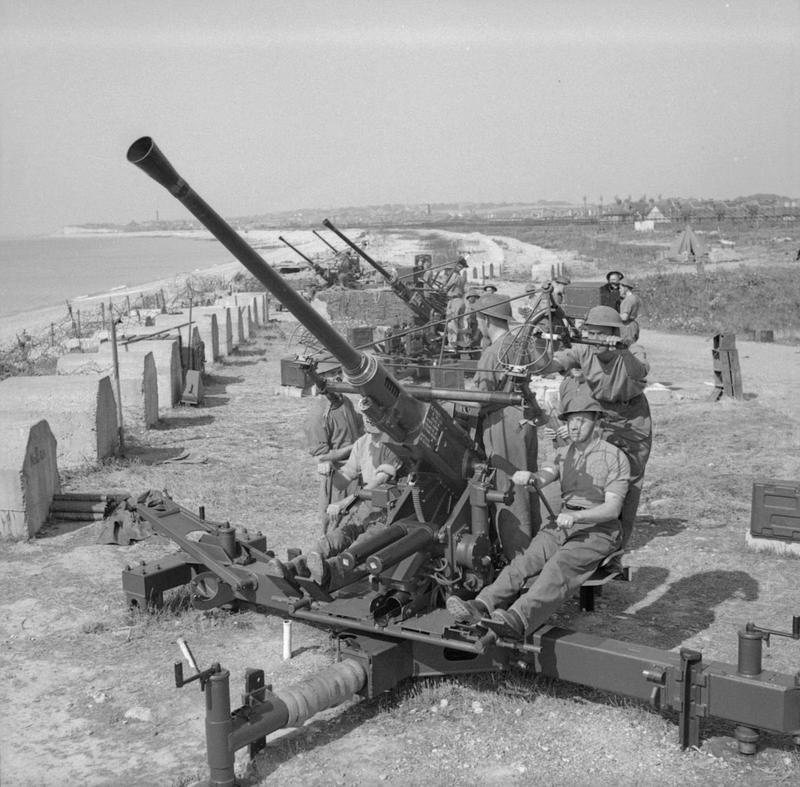
Bofors LAA guns at a South Coast anti-Diver battery, August 1944

Shortly after D-Day, the Germans began launching V-1 flying bombs, codenamed 'Divers', against London. These presented AA Command's biggest challenge since the Blitz. Defences had been planned against this new form of attack (Operation Diver), but it presented a severe problem for AA guns, and after two weeks' experience AA Command carried out a major reorganisation, stripping guns from other areas and repositioning them along the South Coast to target V-1s coming in over the English Channel. 129th (FSR) LAA Regiment rejoined 102 AA Bde, which had taken responsibility for one sector of a new belt of anti-Diver defences under 2 AA Group.

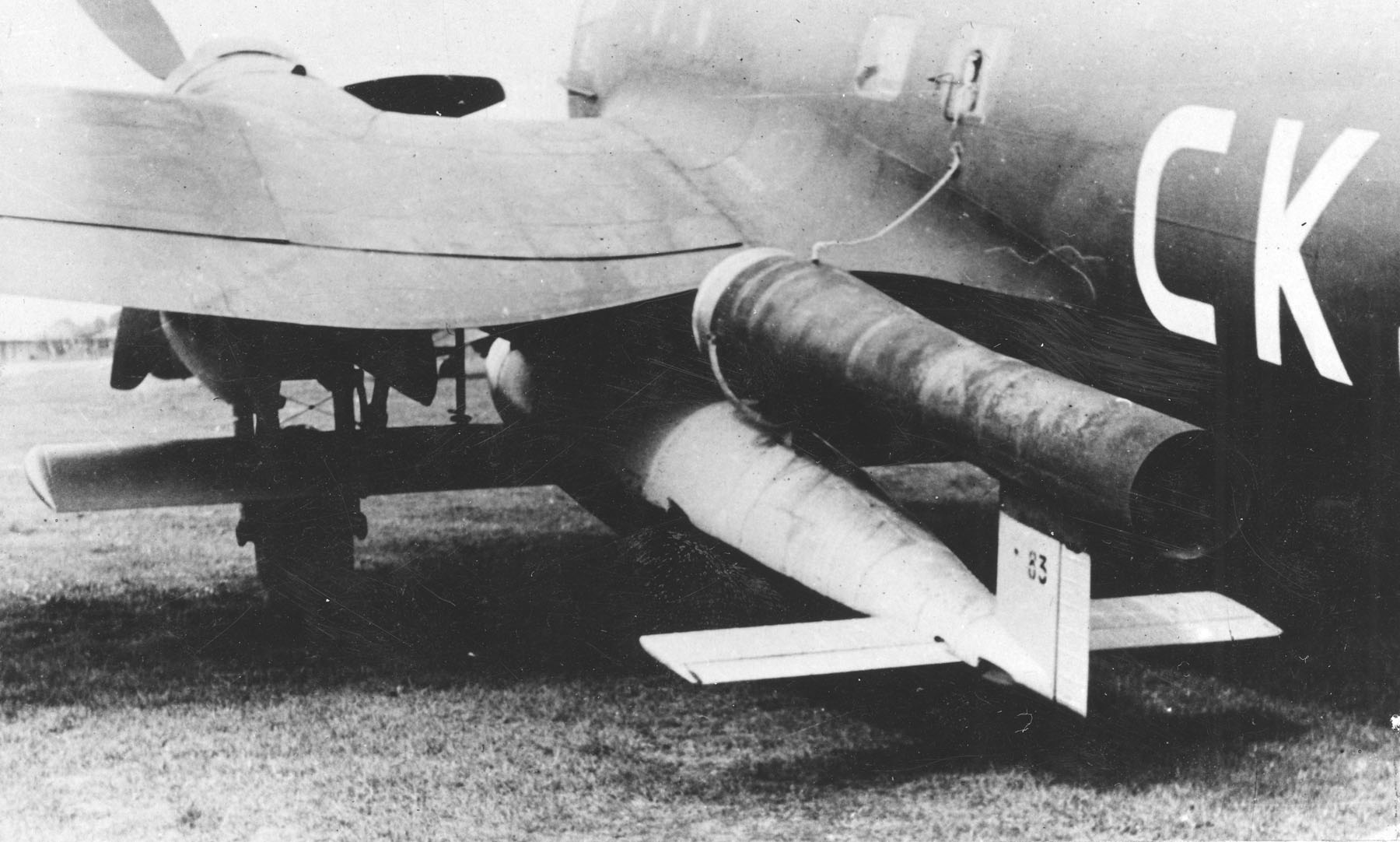
A V-1 slung under the wing of a Heinkel He 111 bomber

The regiment moved with 102 AA Bde back to East Anglia under a new 9 AA Group after 21st Army Group overran the V-1 launching sites in Northern France and the Luftwaffe switched to air-launching V-1s from the North Sea during the autumn and winter.

At the end of 1944, the Luftwaffe was suffering from such shortages of pilots, aircraft and fuel that serious aerial attacks on the UK could be discounted. At the same time, 21st Army Group fighting in North West Europe was suffering a severe manpower shortage. Large numbers of AA gunners were converted into infantry, and the strength of AA Command dwindled: 455 LAA Battery was disbanded at Anerley on 22 March 1945. The regiment was transferred to 57 LAA Bde in March, and was still in 46 AA Bde in 2 AA Group after the war's end, without ever having served overseas.

== Postwar ==
When the TA was reconstituted on 1 January 1947, 129th LAA Regiment with its three remaining batteries (425, 426, 427) was placed in suspended animation at Trowbridge Barracks. The war-raised personnel then reformed the regiment and batteries in the Regular Army with the same numbers. On 1 April, this regiment was redesignated 115th LAA Regiment with 348, 349, 350 LAA Btys. However, it was disbanded a month later. (Note: The original 115th LAA Rgt had been converted from 8th Battalion East Yorkshire Regiment in 1942 and had served as 46th Division's LAA regiment in the Tunisian and Italian campaigns before being disbanded in 1945.)

Meanwhile, the First Surrey Rifles had reformed in the TA on 1 January 1947 as 570th Light Anti-Aircraft Regiment, RA, (First Surrey Rifles) with its HQ at Dulwich, forming part of 64 AA Bde (the former 38 AA Bde) in AA Comman. Its role was partly altered two years later when it was redesignated as an LAA/Searchlight regiment. From 1947 to 1955, the regiment continued to wear its 21st Londons cap badge and 1st Surrey Rifles arm badge.

In 1955, the regiment absorbed 622 Heavy AA Regiment (7th Queens Own) to form 570 LAA Regiment in 30 AA Bde. The combined regiment had no subsidiary title, but the parent units were recognised in the battery titles:

- P (First Surrey Rifles) Bty
- Q (First Surrey Rifles) Bty
- R (Queen's)) Bty
- S (Queen's)) Bty

In 1961, the regiment was merged into 265 LAA Regiment, becoming R (Surrey) Bty, and 265 LAA in turn was merged into 100 Regiment RA in 1967. In the 1970s, a cadre of 265 Regiment was reformed at Camberwell as C Battery (21st London, 1st Surrey Rifles) in 6th (Volunteer) Bn Queen's Regiment. In 1975, the 6th and 7th Bns Queen's Regiment were amalgamated and, in 1980, 10 Platoon of D Company at Camberwell was renamed 10 (Highwood) Platoon in memory of the men of the 1st Surrey Rifles killed at High Wood on the Somme. In 1988 A (Highwood) Company of 8th Queen's Fusiliers formed at the newly rebuilt Flodden Road TA Centre, it held a strong affiliation to its 1st Surrey Rifles heritage, holding a Trench Supper each September to commemorate the Battle of Highwood. In 1993 A Company became HQ Company on the formation of The London Regiment and the 1st Surrey Rifles affiliation was discontinued.

== Honorary Colonels ==
The following served as Honorary Colonel of the regiment:

- FM Sir George Pollock, appointed 6 July 1861
- Lt-Gen Sir Francis Grenfell, appointed 26 October 1889
- Col Ernest Villiers, appointed 2 December 1902 (former Captain, 43rd Light Infantry; Lt-Col of Volunteers 23 May 1883; CO of 1st Surreys from 20 November 1886; died 1921)
- Brig-Gen H. B. P. L. Kennedy, Kings Royal Rifle Corps, appointed 15 March 1922 (regimental adjutant 1914; CO of 1/21st Bn August 1915 – May 1917, then commanding 140 Bde)
- Lt-Col J. N. Horlick, appointed 15 March 1932

== Battle honours ==
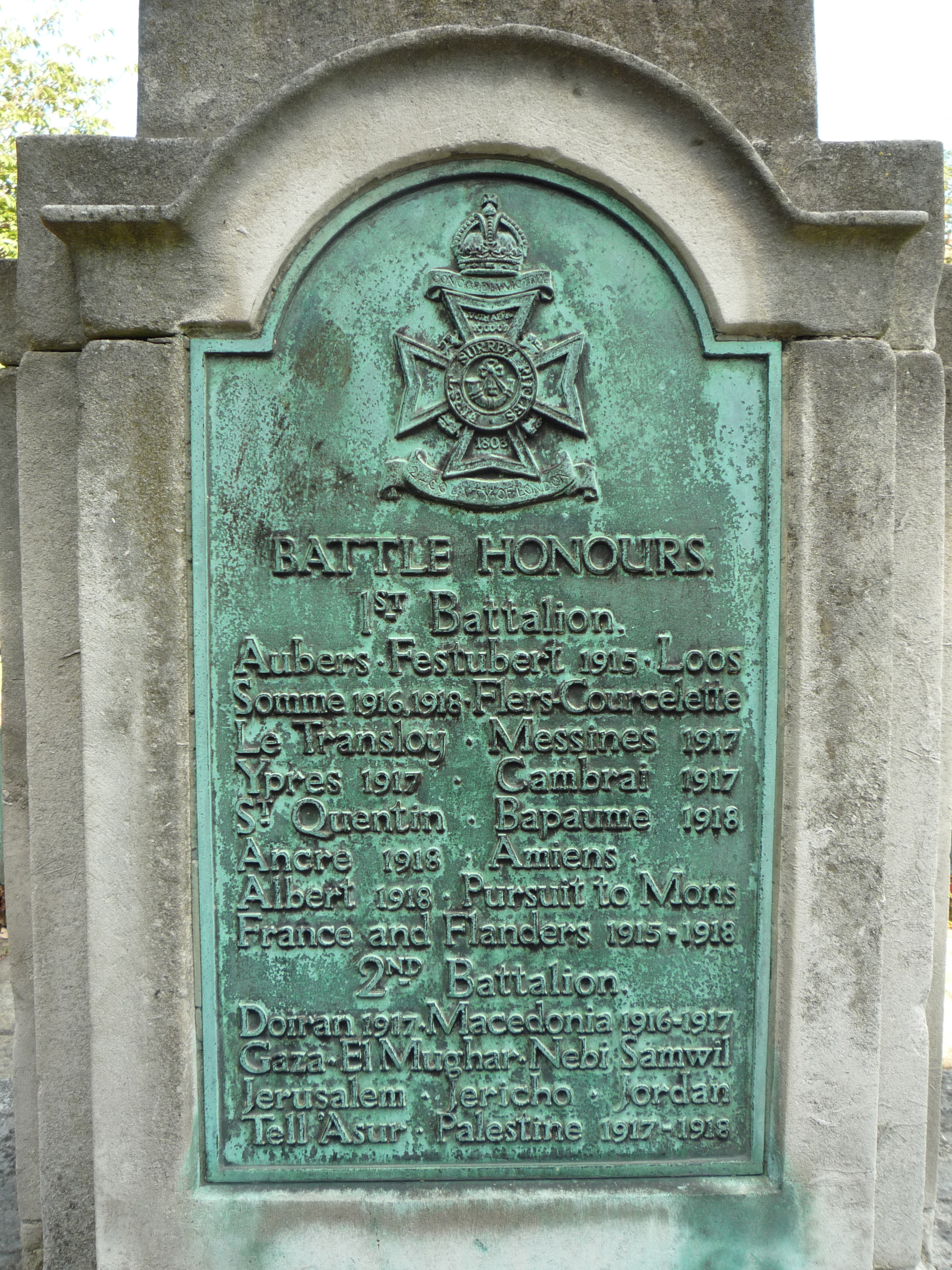
First Surrey Rifles memorial at St Giles' Church, Camberwell

The 1st Surrey Rifles received the following Battle Honours: those shown in bold type were borne on the drums and bugles (as a rifle regiment, no colours were carried):

South Africa 1900–02

Aubers, Festubert 1915, Loos, Somme 1916 '18, Flers-Courcelette, Le Transloy, Messines 1917, Ypres 1917, Cambrai 1917, St Quentin, Bapaume 1918, Ancre 1918, Amiens, Albert 1918, Pursuit to Mons, France and Flanders 1915–18, Doiran 1917, Macedonia 1916–17, Gaza, El Mughar, Nebi Samwil, Jerusalem, Jericho, Jordan, Tell 'Asur, Palestine 1917–18.

The RA and RE do not receive battle honours, so none were awarded to the regiment for its service during World War II.

== Traditions ==
The London RVCs of 1859–50 considered themselves the successors to the Volunteers of 1793–1815. The 1st Surreys claimed descent from the following Volunteer units:

- The Bermondsey Volunteers (1793)
- The Bermondsey Armed Association (1794)
- The Southwark Armed Association (1794)
- The Newington Armed Association (1794)
- The Rotherhithe Armed Association (1794)
- The Camberwell Armed Association (1794)
- 1st Regiment of Surrey Volunteers (1803) – before the 1914–18 battle honours were added to the arms of the cross, the lower arm of the cross forming the regimental badge bore the date '1803' (see photo above)
- East Surrey, or Hanover Park Rifle Club (1852)

The Regimental March was Lutzow's Wild Hunt.

From 1980 to 1988, 10 Platoon of 6/7th Queen's Regiment was named 10 (Highwood) Platoon in memory of the men of the 1st Surrey Rifles killed at High Wood on the Somme.

== Memorials ==
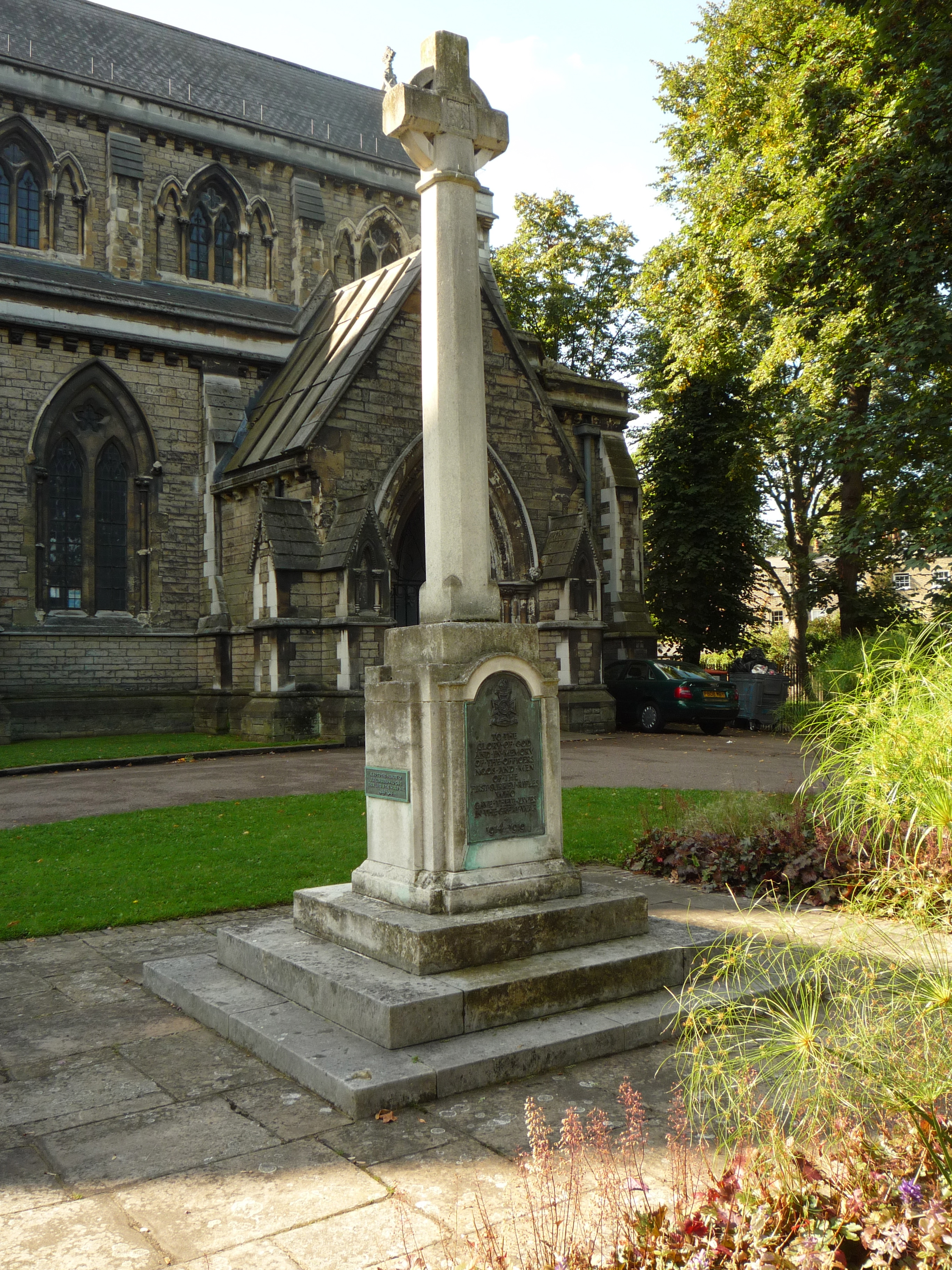
First Surrey Rifles memorial at St Giles' Church, Camberwell

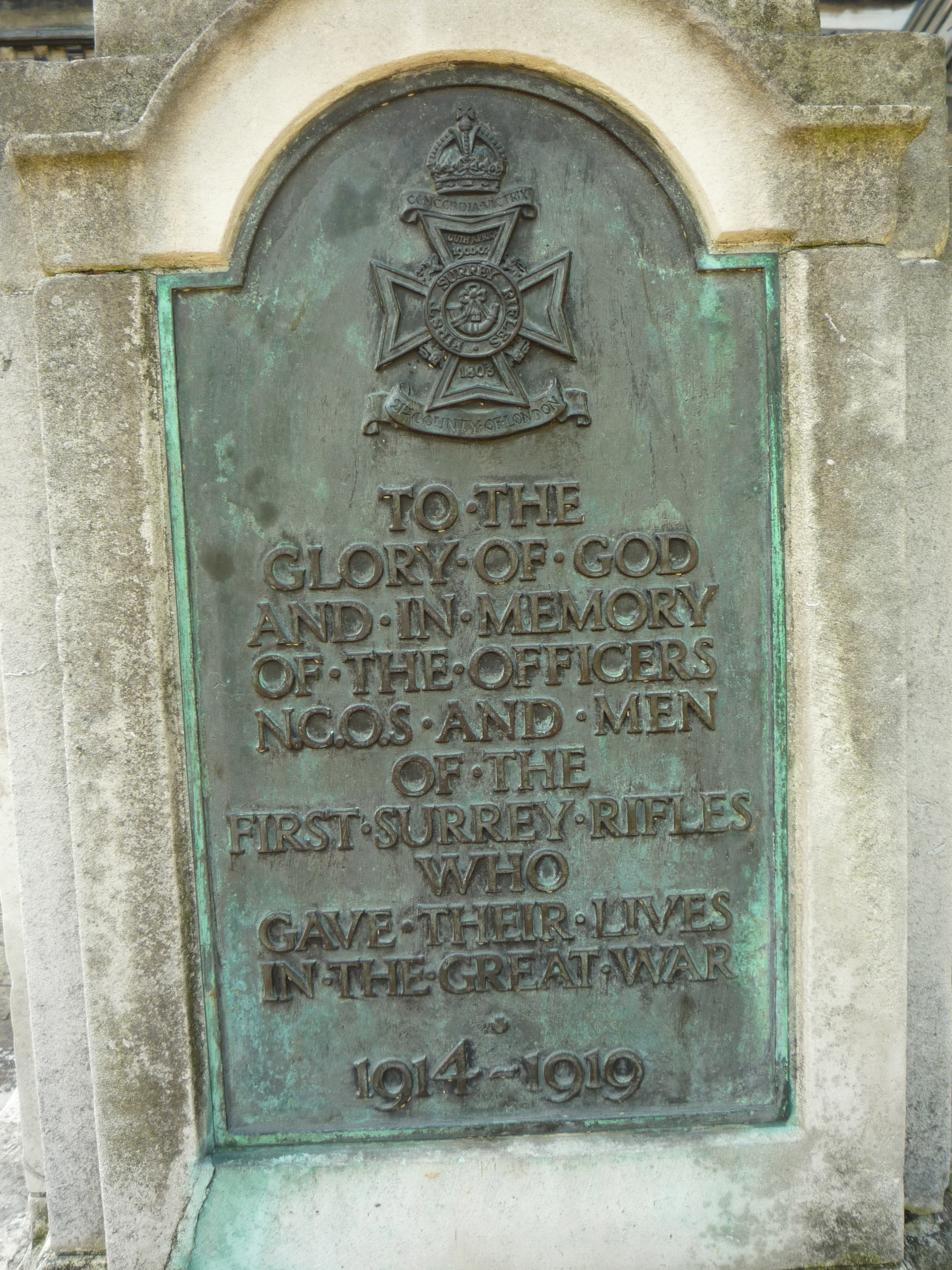
Detail from the memorial

The regimental war memorial stands in front of St Giles' Church, Camberwell. The bronze plaque at the rear lists the battle honours won in World War I, which were later added to the regimental badge. Small panels have been added to the sides to commemorate those who served in South Africa 1899–1902 and those who were killed in World War II.

The regiment is one of those whose titles are inscribed on the City and County of London Troops Memorial in front of the Royal Exchange, London, with architectural design by Sir Aston Webb and sculpture by Alfred Drury. The right-hand (southern) bronze figure flanking this memorial depicts an infantryman representative of the various London infantry units.

The two wooden memorial crosses erected at High Wood and Eaucourt l'Abbaye by 47 Divisional Engineers in 1916 were falling into disrepair by 1925, when they were replaced in stone. The restored wooden crosses were preserved at the Duke of York's Headquarters in London (the former divisional HQ) until that building was sold in 2003, and are now at Connaught House, the HQ of the London Irish Rifles on the site of the former First Surrey Rifles drill hall at Flodden Road, Camberwell.

== Sport ==
The 1st Surrey Rifles had an association football club drawn from its personnel, that played on Flodden Road at Camberwell. In the early years of the FA Cup, it competed in the Cup ties, but never rose further than second round, scores from their point of view:

- 1872–73
  1st round v Upton Park 2–0
  2nd round v Maidenhead 0–3
- 1873–74
  1st round v Barnes 0–0; replay 0–1
- 1875–76
  1st round v Wanderers 0–5
- 1876–77
  1st round v 105th Regiment 0–3
- 1877–78
  1st round v Forest School 1–0
  2nd round v Old Harrovians 0–6
- 1885–86
  1st round v Clapham Rovers 0–12
- 1886–87
  1st round v Upton Park 0–9
