= 24th (County of London) Battalion, London Regiment (The Queen's) =

19th Surrey Rifle Volunteers 4th Volunteer Bn, Queen's Regiment 24th Bn, London Regiment (Queen's) 7th (Southwark) Bn, Queen's Regiment 622 Heavy Anti-Aircraft Regiment, RA
- Active: 13 March 1860 – 1 May 1961
- Country: United Kingdom
- Branch: Territorial Force
- Role: Infantry
- Size: 1–3 Battalions
- Part of: Surrey Brigade; 47th (2nd London) Division
- Garrison/HQ: Lambeth/Southwark
- Engagements: Second Boer War; World War I: Western Front; Salonika; Palestine; World War II: France; Dunkirk; Western Desert; Alamein; Tunisia; Italy; North West Europe

Commanders
- Notable commanders: William Roupell, MP

The 24th (County of London) Battalion, London Regiment (The Queen's) was an auxiliary unit of the British Army. Formed in 1908 from Volunteer units in the Surrey suburbs of London that dated back to 1860, it was part of the London Regiment in the Territorial Force (TF). Its battalions served on the Western Front at Salonika and in Palestine during World War I. When the London Regiment was abolished the unit reverted to the Queen's Royal Regiment (West Surrey) and served in the Battle of France, in North Africa, including the Battle of Alamein, and in Italy and North West Europe as part of the 7th Armoured Division (the 'Desert Rats'). Postwar it was converted to an anti-aircraft regiment of the Royal Artillery.

== Volunteer Force ==
The invasion scare of 1859 led to the creation of the Volunteer Force and huge enthusiasm for joining Rifle Volunteer Corps (RVCs). Among the RVCs raised in the county of Surrey at this time was the 19th Surrey (or Lambeth) Rifle Volunteers recruited from Lambeth in South London. It was formed on 13 March 1860 and soon reached a strength of eight companies under the command of Major-Commandant William Roupell. Roupell was Member of Parliament (MP) for Lambeth and an enthusiast for the Volunteer Movement. His brother Richard was one of the captains. The unit recruited artisans and mechanics from a wide variety of employers in South London.

William and Richard Roupell were convicted and imprisoned for perjury and forgery in 1862 and were obliged to resign, so a number of new officers were commissioned into the 19th Surrey Rifle Volunteers (referred to as a battalion) on 4 February 1862. Valentine Hicks Labrow, formerly of the 2nd West Yorkshire Light Infantry Militia, was appointed as Major on 2 June 1863 and promoted to Lieutenant-Colonel on 21 November 1864.

The smaller 10th (Bermondsey) and 23rd (Rotherhithe) Surrey RVCs were attached to the 19th (Lambeth) for administrative purposes from 1863 until 10 October 1868 when they left to form the 4th Administrative Battalion, Surrey Rifle Volunteer Corps. The 19th's headquarters (HQ) was at 71 New Street, Kennington Park from 1869.

Under the 'Localisation of the Forces' scheme introduced by the Cardwell Reforms of 1872, Volunteers were grouped into county brigades with their local Regular and Militia battalions – Sub-District No 48 (County of Surrey) for the 19th Surrey RVC, grouped with the 2nd (Queen's) Regiment of Foot

Volunteer corps were consolidated into larger units in 1880, when the 19th Surreys was redesignated the 7th on 7 September, corrected to 8th Surrey Rifle Volunteers four days later.

The Childers Reforms of 1881 took Cardwell's reforms further, and the Volunteers were formally affiliated to their local Regular regiment, the 8th Surrey RVC becoming a Volunteer Battalion (VB) of the Queen's (Royal West Surrey Regiment) on 1 July. The 8th Surrey RVC changed its designation to 4th Volunteer Battalion, Queen's (Royal West Surrey Regiment) on 1 March 1883. It was increased to 10 companies in 1890, and a cyclist company was added in 1901.

While the sub-districts were later referred to as 'brigades', they were purely administrative organisations and the Volunteers were excluded from the 'mobilisation' part of the Cardwell system. The Stanhope Memorandum of December 1888 proposed a more comprehensive Mobilisation Scheme for Volunteer units, which would assemble in their own brigades at key points in case of war. In peacetime these brigades provided a structure for collective training. Under this scheme the Volunteer Battalions of the Queen's (West Surrey) and the East Surrey Regiment formed the Surrey Brigade. The brigade's assembly point was at Caterham Barracks, the Brigade of Guards' depot conveniently situated for the London Defence Positions along the North Downs.

=== Cadet Battalions, Queen's ===
A cadet corps was formed at Mayall College, Herne Hill, in 1888 and affiliated to the 4th VB, but it transferred to the 22nd (Central London Rangers) Middlesex Rifle Volunteer Corps in 1891. Another cadet corps was proposed in January 1889, with Maj Salmond of the 3rd (Derbyshire Militia) Bn, Sherwood Foresters being asked to take charge. Viscount Wolseley made a speech at Red Cross Hall in Southwark on 30 May that encouraged sufficient boys to come forward to form two companies. A third followed in 1889, then a fourth, which led to War Office to form it into a battalion as the 1st Cadet Battalion, Queen's (Royal West Surrey Regiment), the first independent battalion of its kind in London. By 1891 it had six companies, making it the strongest in England. Recruited from schools and boys' clubs, by 1904 the battalion was distributed as follows:

- HQ – Union Street, Southwark
- A & B Companies – Southwark
- C Company – Passmore Edwards Settlement, St Pancras, and Marlborough Road Board School, Chelsea
- D Company – Haileybury Club, Stepney
- E Company – St Andrew's Institute, Westminster
- F Company – St Peter's Institute, Pimlico
- G Company – Bethnal Green
- H Company – Eton Mission, Hackney

A 2nd Cadet Bn, Queen's, of four companies was formed in November 1890. Its HQ was originally at Lambeth Polytechnic, later moving to Kirkdale in Clapham, and then to Brockwell Hall in Herne Hill. It was increased to six companies in 1891. In 1894 it was redesignated 1st Cadet Battalion, King's Royal Rifle Corps and its HQ moved to Finsbury Square.

A new 2nd Cadet Bn, Queen's, was raised in October 1901 from boys of 1st Peckham Lads' Brigade, first formed in 1894. It had six companies, with HQ at 53 Copeland Road, Peckham.

=== Second Boer War ===
After Black Week in December 1899, the Volunteers were invited to send active service units to assist the Regulars in the Second Boer War. The War Office decided that one company 116 strong could be recruited from the volunteer battalions of any infantry regiment that had a regular battalion serving in South Africa. The Queen's VBs accordingly raised a service company that served in South Africa and earned the volunteer battalions their first Battle honour: South Africa 1900–02.

In the reorganisation after the end of the Boer War in 1902, the large Surrey Brigade was split into separate East and West Surrey Brigades, under command of the respective regimental districts.

== Territorial Force ==
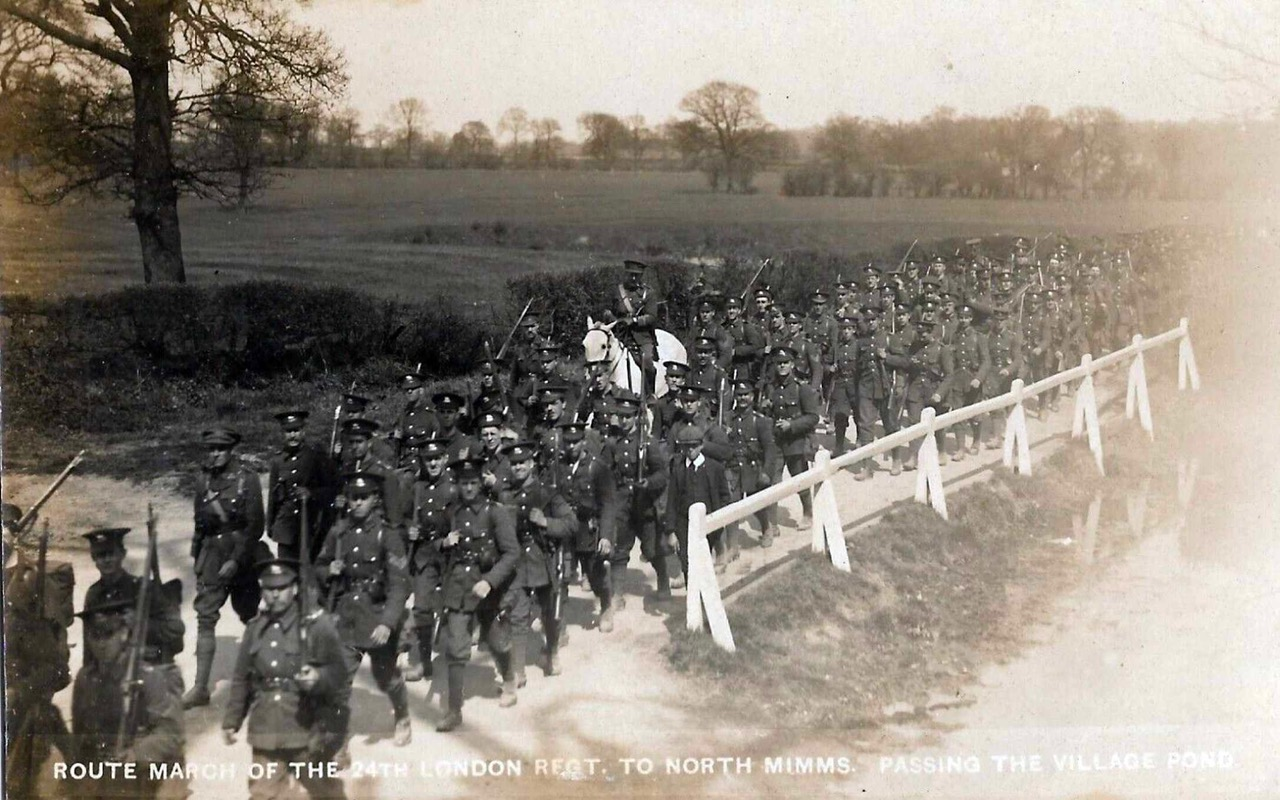
Route march of the 24th London Regiment to North Mimms, passing the village pond (ca 1910).

Under the Haldane Reforms of 1908 the Volunteers were subsumed into the new Territorial Force (TF), administered by county Territorial Associations. The volunteers in rural Surrey came under the Surrey Territorial Association; however, because many of the North Surrey suburban parishes had been included in the new County of London since 1889, the battalions recruited in South London were included in a new all-TF London Regiment under the County of London TA. Consequently, the 4th VB Queen's became 24th (County of London) Battalion, London Regiment (Queen's).

The four former Surrey battalions of the London Regiment (now 21st–24th Londons) comprised the 6th London Brigade in the TF's 2nd London Division.

== World War I ==
The 23rd Londons served on the Western Front with the 47th (1/2nd London) Division.

A 2/23rd Battalion was formed, which served at Salonika and in Palestine with 60th (2/2nd London) Division before returning to the Western Front at the end of the war.

== World War II ==
In 1937 the battalion reverted to the Queen's Royal Regiment (West Surrey), as the 7th (Southwark) Battalion. The 1/7th and 2/7th Battalions served through World War II.

== Postwar ==
After the World War the battalion became the 622nd Heavy Anti-Aircraft Regiment, Royal Artillery.

== Heritage & ceremonial ==
=== Traditions ===
The 19th (Lambeth) Surrey RVC claimed to be the lineal descendant of the Lambeth Volunteers, one of the Volunteer Associations raised in SouthLondon in 1798 during an earlier invasion scare.

=== Uniforms & insignia ===
The uniform of the 19th Surrey RVC and 4th VB, Queens, was Rifle green with scarlet facings, similar to that of the 60th Rifles. The battalion adopted the Paschal Lamb badge of the Queen's Regiment. On conversion to the TF the battalion adopted the full dress of the Queen's (scarlet with blue facings), but khaki service dress was worn on most occasions.

=== Honorary colonels ===
The following served as Honorary Colonel of the battalion:

- Heneage Charles Bagot-Chester, former captain, 29th Foot, appointed 28 March 1868
- Charles Ratcliff, appointed 2 May 1877
- C. Harding, appointed 21 November 1885
- James Charlton-Humphreys 21 July 1897
- A. Faunce-De Laune, appointed 1 April 1908
- Col W.G. Simpson, CMG, DSO, TD, appointed 31 July 1920

=== Battle Honours ===
The battalion was awarded the following Battle honours:

Second Boer War:
South Arica 1900–02

World War I:
Aubers, Festubert 1915, Loos, Somme 1916, '18, Flers-Courcelette, Le Transloy, Messines 1917, Ypres 1917,Cambrai 1917, St Quentin, Ancre 1918, Albert 1918, Hindenburg Line, Épehy, Pursuit to Mons, France and Flanders 1915–18, Doiran 1917, Macedonia 1916-17, Gaza, El Mughar, Nebi Samwil, Jerusalem, Jericho, Jordan, Tell 'Asur, Palestine 1917–18
The honours listed in bold were inscribed on the colours.

Battle honours for World War II were awarded as part of the Queen's Regiment, attributable as follows: 1/7th Battalion:
Villers Bocage, Mont Pinçon, Lower Maas, North West Europe 1940, '44–45, Deir el Munassib, El Alamein, Advance to Tripoli, Medenine, Tunis, North Africa 1940–43, Salerno, Monte Stella, Scafati Bridge, Volturno Crossing, Italy 1943–44
2/7th Battalion:
North West Europe 1940, Salerno, Monte Stella, Scafati Bridge, Volturno Crossing, Monte Camino, Garigliano Crossing, Damiano, Anzio, Gothic Line, Gerinano Ridge, Senio Pocket, Senio Floodbank, Casa Fabbri Rdge, Menate, Filo, Argenta Gap, Italy 1943–45

=== Memorials ===
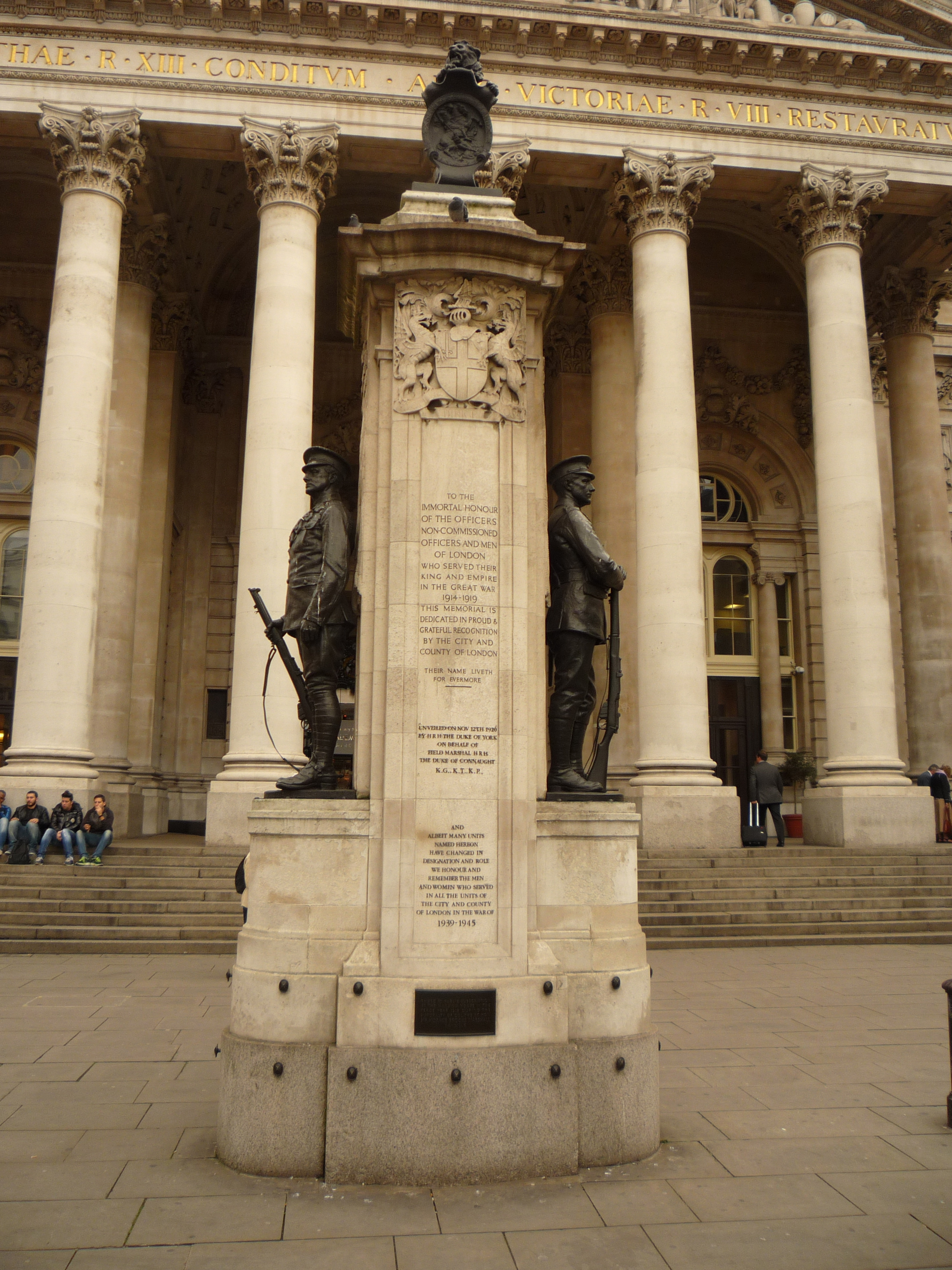
London Troops Memorial at the Royal Exchange.

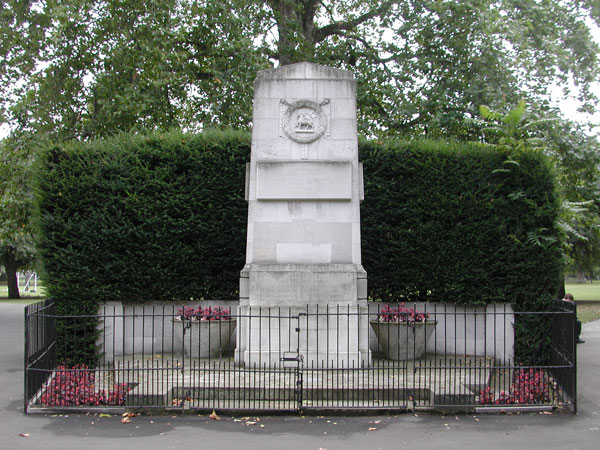
The battalion's war memorial in Kennington Park.

The 24th Bn London Regiment is listed on the City and County of London Troops Memorial in front of the Royal Exchange, with architectural design by Sir Aston Webb and sculpture by Alfred Drury. The right-hand (southern) bronze figure flanking this memorial depicts an infantryman representative of the various London infantry units.

The battalion's own World War I memorial was unveiled at the entrance to Kennington Park in 1924, with an inscription to its World War II dead added later.

The Regimental Colours presented to the 24th Londons at Windsor Castle on 19 June 1909 are laid up in St Mary's Church, Kennington Park Road.
