= 22nd (County of London) Battalion, London Regiment (The Queen's) =

6th Surrey Rifle Volunteers 3rd Volunteer Bn, Queen's Regiment 22nd Bn, London Regiment (Queen's) 6th (Bermondsey) Bn, Queen's Regiment
- Active: 7 February 1860–1 May 1961
- Country: United Kingdom
- Branch: Volunteer Force/Territorial Force/Territorial Army
- Role: Infantry
- Size: 1–3 Battalions
- Part of: Surrey Brigade; 47th (2nd London) Division
- Garrison/HQ: Bermondsey
- Engagements: Second Boer War; World War I: Western Front; Salonika; Palestine; World War II: France; North Africa; Alamein; Italy; North West Europe

Commanders
- Notable commanders: Samuel Bourne Bevington

The 22nd (County of London) Battalion, London Regiment (The Queen's) was an auxiliary unit of the British Army. Formed in 1908 from Volunteer units in the Surrey suburbs of London that dated back to 1860, it was part of the London Regiment in the Territorial Force (TF). Its battalions served on the Western Front and in Palestine during World War I. When the London Regiment was abolished in 1937 the unit reverted to the Queen's Royal Regiment (West Surrey) and during World War II its battalions fought in North Africa, Tunisia, Italy and North West Europe. It was amalgamated with other battalions into the Queen's Regiment in 1961.

== Volunteer Force ==
The invasion scare of 1859 led to the creation of the Volunteer Force and huge enthusiasm for joining Rifle Volunteer Corps (RVCs) composed of part-time soldiers eager to supplement the Regular British Army in time of need. Among the RVCs raised in the county of Surrey at this time were those from Bermondsey and Rotherhithe in the south-east suburbs of London:

- 10th (Bermondsey) Surrey RVC, raised as two companies on 7 February 1860
- 23rd (Rotherhithe) Surrey RVC, raised on 1 February 1861; it had two companies by 1866, increased to six by 1868.

These two units were attached for administrative purposes to the larger 19th (Lambeth) Surrey RVC, but on 10 October 1868 they were grouped into the 4th Administrative Battalion with its headquarters (HQ) at Bermondsey, moving to Rotherhithe the following year. Captain-Commandant James Payne of the 23rd was appointed Lieutenant-Colonel of the battalion. Samuel Bourne Bevington, a member of a leading Bermondsey industrial family, had enlisted as a Private in the 1st Surrey Rifles in 1859. He was appointed Captain-Commandant of the 10th Surrey RVC on 22 February 1868 and promoted to Major of the 4th Admin Bn under Payne's command on 17 December 1873. Payne remained commanding officer (CO) until 26 July 1884, when Bevington was promoted to succeed him. Bevington was CO of the battalion from until 1899 and later became the first mayor of the new Metropolitan Borough of Bermondsey.

Under the 'Localisation of the Forces' scheme introduced by the Cardwell Reforms of 1872, Volunteers were grouped into county brigades with their local Regular and Militia battalions – Sub-District No 48 (County of Surrey) in Western District for the 4th Surrey Admin battalion, grouped with the 2nd Foot (The Queen's Royal Regiment). Volunteer corps were consolidated into larger units in 1880, when the 4th Surrey Admin Battalion became the 6th Surrey RVC. The Childers Reforms of 1881 took Cardwell's reforms further, and the Volunteers were formally affiliated to their local Regular regiment, the 6th Surrey RVC becoming the 3rd Volunteer Battalion, Queen's Royal Regiment (West Surrey) in March 1883. Battalion HQ moved back to Bermondsey in 1884. A Cadet Corps existed at Bermondsey from 1885 until 1895, and another was formed at Streatham Grammar School in 1899.

While the sub-districts were later referred to as 'brigades', they were purely administrative organisations and the Volunteers were excluded from the 'mobilisation' part of the Cardwell system. The Stanhope Memorandum of December 1888 proposed a more comprehensive Mobilisation Scheme for Volunteer units, which would assemble in their own brigades at key points in case of war. In peacetime these brigades provided a structure for collective training. Under this scheme the Volunteer Battalions of the Queen's and the East Surrey Regiment formed the Surrey Brigade. The assembly point for the brigade was at Caterham Barracks, the Brigade of Guards' depot conveniently situated for the London Defence Positions along the North Downs.

=== Second Boer War ===
After Black Week in December 1899, the Volunteers were invited to send active service units to assist the Regulars in the Second Boer War. The War Office decided that one company 116 strong could be recruited from the volunteer battalions of any infantry regiment that had a regular battalion serving in South Africa. The Queen's VBs accordingly raised a service company, which was replaced by a second after a year's service. The 3rd VB contributed a section of men to each company, and to the City Imperial Volunteers (CIVs). This service earned the 3rd VB its first Battle honour: South Africa 1900–02.

In the reorganisation after the end of the Boer War in 1902, the Surrey Brigade was split into separate East and West Surrey Brigades, under command of the respective regimental districts.

== Territorial Force ==
Under the Haldane Reforms of 1908 the Volunteers were subsumed into the new Territorial Force (TF), administered by county Territorial Associations. The volunteers in rural Surrey came under the Surrey Territorial Association; however, because many of the North Surrey suburban parishes had been included in the new County of London since 1889, the battalions recruited in South London were included in a new all-TF London Regiment under the County of London TA. Consequently, the 3rd VB Queen's became 22nd (County of London) Bn, London Regiment (The Queen's). It drill hall was at 2 Jamaica Road in Bermondsey.

The four former Surrey battalions of the London Regiment (now 21st–24th Londons) comprised the 6th London Brigade in the TF's 2nd London Division.

== World War I ==
During World War I the 22nd Londons formed three battalions, of which the 1/22nd served on the Western Front and the 2/22nd served at Salonika and in Palestine.

== Interwar ==
The London Regiment was abolished in 1938, and the battalion returned to the Queen's Royal Regiment (West Surrey) in 1937, now as that regiment's 6th (Bermondsey) Battalion.

== World War II ==
Once again the unit formed two battalions, both of which served in the Battle of France, North Africa and in Italy. The 1/6th Queen's then served in North West Europe.

== Postwar ==
Reformed postwar, the 6th (Bermondsey) Bn was amalgamated with other Territorial Army battalions to form the 3rd Battalion Queen's Royal Surrey Regiment in 1961.

== Heritage & ceremonial ==
=== Uniforms & insignia ===
The uniform of the 6th Surrey RVC was scarlet with blue facings, the same as the Queen's Regiment. The battalion later adopted the Paschal Lamb badge of the Queen's Regiment, which it retained as a battalion of the London Regiment. On conversion to the TF the battalion adopted the full dress of the Queen's (scarlet with blue facings), but khaki service dress was worn on most occasions.

=== Honorary Colonels ===
The following served as Honorary Colonel of the battalion:

- Field Marshal Sir William Gomm, appointed 24 March 1869, died 1875
- Francis Culling Carr-Gomm, appointed 25 April 1885
- Col Wallace C. Dixon, VD, former CO, appointed 12 August 1909
- Lt-Col R.K. Bevington, VD, former CO, appointed 25 February 1914
- E.J. Previté, VD, TD, former CO, appointed 23 February 1922
- Col C.F.H. Greenwood, CB, DSO, OBE, TD, appointed 12 May 1937

=== Battle Honours ===
The battalion was awarded the following Battle honours:

Second Boer War (3rd VB, Queen's):
South Arica 1900–02

World War I (1/22nd & 2/22nd Londons):
Aubers, Festubert 1915, Loos, Somme 1916, '18, Flers-Courcelette, Le Transloy, Messines 1917, Ypres 1917, Cambrai 1917, St Quentin, Bapaume 1918, Ancre 1918, Albert 1918, Pursuit to Mons, France and Flanders 1915-18, Doiran 1917, Macedonia 1916-17, Gaza, El Mughar, Nebi Samwil, Jerusalem, Jericho, Jordan, Tell 'Asur, Megiddo, Sharon, Palestine 1917–18

Battle honours for World War II were awarded as part of the Queen's Regiment, attributable as follows: 1/6th Battalion:
Defence of Escaut, Villers Bocage, Mont Pinçon, Lower Maas, North West Europe 1940, '44–45, Deir el Munassib, El Alamein, Advance to Tripoli, Medenine, Tunis, North Africa 1940–43, Salerno, Monte Stella, Scafati Bridge, Volturno Crossing, Italy 1943–44
2/6th Battalion:
North West Europe 1940, Salerno, Monte Stella, Scafati Bridge, Volturno Crossing, Monte Camino, Garigliano Crossing, Damiano, Anzio, Gothic Line, Gerinano Ridge, Senio Pocket, Senio Floodbank, Casa Fabbri Rdge, Menate, Filo, Argenta Gap, Italy 1943–45

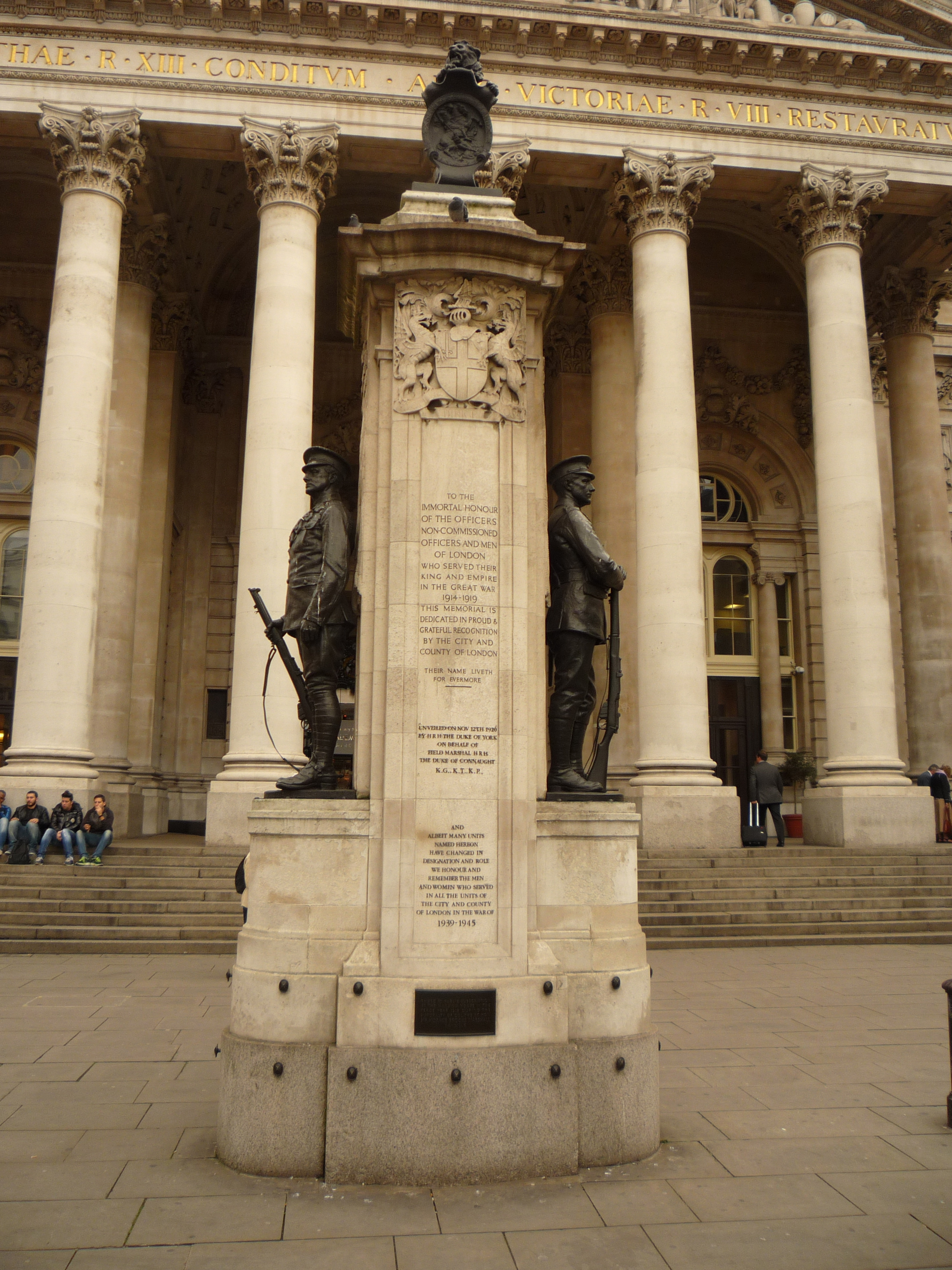
London Troops Memorial at the Royal Exchange

=== Memorials ===
The Boer War memorial plaque inside St James's Church, Bermondsey, records the men of Bermondsey who volunteered for service in South Africa, including those of the 3rd VB, Queen's, who went out with the CIVs and the 1st and 2nd Service Sections.

The 22nd Bn London Regiment is listed on the City and County of London Troops Memorial in front of the Royal Exchange, with architectural design by Sir Aston Webb and sculpture by Alfred Drury. The right-hand (southern) bronze figure flanking this memorial depicts an infantryman representative of the various London infantry units.

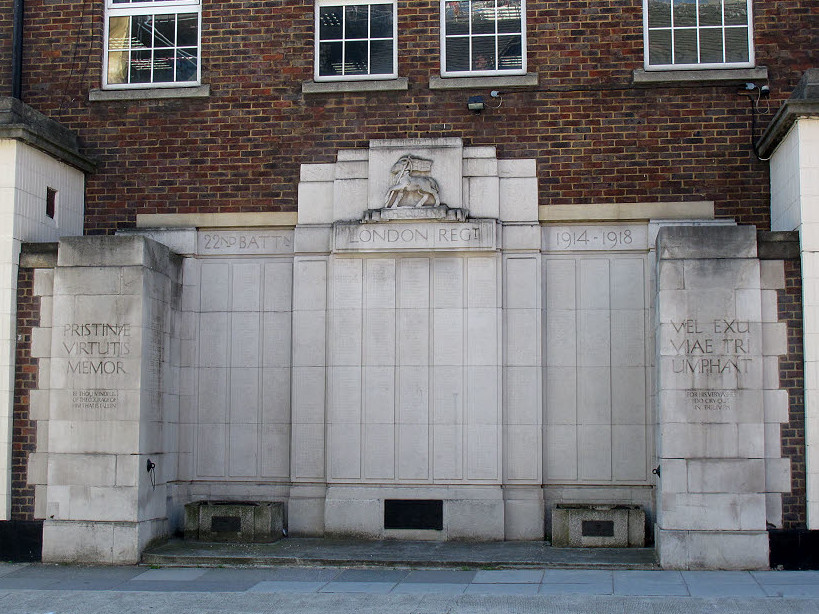
22nd London's memorial, Bermondsey.

Unveiled in 1921, the battalion's own World War I memorial on Old Jamaica Road in Bermondsey was Grade II listed in 2010. The World War II names were added when the worn lettering was re-cut in 1993.

There is a statue to Samuel Bevington on Tooley Street at the south end of Tower Bridge. He is depicted in his mayoral robes, but the inscription on the stone plinth begins by recording his colonelcy of the 3rd VB, Queen's.

The Regimental Colours presented to the 22nd Londons at Windsor Castle on 19 June 1909 are laid up in St Mary Magdalen Church, Bermondsey. The King's Colour presented to the 2/22nd Bn at Horse Guards Parade on 26 February 1921 is held by the Surrey Infantry Museum.

== Notes ==
- Margaret Baker, Discovering London Statues and Monuments, 5th Edn, Prince's
- Maj A.F. Becke,History of the Great War: Order of Battle of Divisions, Part 2a: The Territorial Force Mounted Divisions and the 1st-Line Territorial Force Divisions (42–56), London: HM Stationery Office, 1935/Uckfield: Naval & Military Press, 2007, ISBN 1-847347-39-8.
- Ian F.W. Beckett, Riflemen Form: A Study of the Rifle Volunteer Movement 1859–1908, Aldershot: Ogilby Trusts, 1982, ISBN 0 85936 271 X.
- Col John K. Dunlop, The Development of the British Army 1899–1914, London: Methuen, 1938.
- J.B.M. Frederick, Lineage Book of British Land Forces 1660–1978, Vol I, Wakefield: Microform Academic, 1984, ISBN 1-85117-007-3.
- Brig E.A. James, British Regiments 1914–18, London: Samson Books, 1978/Uckfield: Naval & Military Press, 2001, ISBN 978-1-84342-197-9.
- Edward M. Spiers, The Army and Society 1815–1914, London: Longmans, 1980, ISBN 0-582-48565-7.
- Ray Westlake, Tracing the Rifle Volunteers, Barnsley: Pen and Sword, 2010, ISBN 978-1-84884-211-3.
