= 97th Deccan Infantry =

- Active: 1794–1922
- Country: Indian Empire
- Branch: Army
- Type: Infantry
- Part of: Nizam's Contingent; Hyderabad Contingent; Madras Command
- Colors: Red; faced dark green
- Engagements: Nagpore; Battle of Megiddo (1918)

The 97th Deccan Infantry was an infantry regiment of the British Indian Army. They could trace their origin to 1794, when they were the 3rd Battalion of the Aurangabad Division in the Hyderabad State army. Which took part in the Battle of Seringapatam in the Fourth Anglo-Mysore War.

After the Kitchener reforms of the Indian Army all the Princely state forces were incorporated into the Indian Army in 1903. During World War I the regiment served in the 15th Indian Division during the Mesopotamia Campaign.

After World War I the Indian government again reformed the army, moving from single battalion regiments to multi battalion regiments. The 97th Deccan Infantry now became the 3rd Battalion, 19th Hyderabad Regiment. This was one of the regiments allocated to the new Indian Army on independence.

== Previous names ==
- 3rd Battalion of the Aurangabad Division - 1794
- 4th Regiment of Infantry, Nizam's Army - 1826
- 4th Infantry, Hyderabad Contingent - 1854
- 97th Deccan Infantry - 1903
