= List of regiments of the Indian Army (1922) =

Indian Army
- Star of India Red Ensign
- Active: 1857–1947
- Country: India
- Allegiance: British Crown
- Type: Army
- Size: 2.5 million men 1945
- Engagements: Second Afghan War; Third Afghan War; Second Burmese War; Third Burmese War; Second Opium War; 1882 Anglo-Egyptian War; 1868 Expedition to Abyssinia; First Mohmand Campaign; Boxer Rebellion; Tirah Campaign; British expedition to Tibet; Sudan Campaign; World War I Waziristan campaign 1919–1920; Waziristan campaign 1936–1939; World War II; North West Frontier

Commanders
- Notable commanders: Herbert Kitchener, 1st Earl Kitchener; William Slim, 1st Viscount Slim; Archibald Wavell, 1st Earl Wavell; Claude Auchinleck

This is a list of regiments of the Indian Army as it was following the reorganisation of the Indian Armed Forces in 1922.

== Cavalry ==
=== Regular ===
- Governor General's Bodyguard
- Governor's Bodyguard, Madras
- Governor's Bodyguard, Bombay
- Governor's Bodyguard, Bengal: Raised in 1912.
- 1st Duke of York's Own Skinner's Horse: Formed by merging 1st Duke of York's Own Lancers (Skinner's Horse) and 3rd Skinner's Horse. Renamed Skinner's Horse (1st Duke of York's Own) in 1927. Allotted to India in 1947. Renamed 1st Horse (Skinner's Horse) in 1950.
- 2nd Lancers (Gardner's Horse): Formed by merging 2nd Lancers (Gardner's Horse) and 4th Lancers. Renamed 2nd Royal Lancers (Gardner's Horse) in 1937. Allotted to India in 1947. Renamed 2nd Lancers (Gardner's Horse) in 1950.
- 3rd Cavalry: Formed by merging 5th Cavalry and 8th Cavalry. Allotted to India in 1947.
- 4th Duke of Cambridge's Own Hodson's Horse: Formed by merging 9th Hodson's Horse and 10th Duke of Cambridge’s Own Lancers (Hodson’s Horse). Renamed Hodson's Horse (4th Duke of Cambridge's Own Lancers) in 1927. Allotted to India in 1947. Renamed 4th Horse (Hodon's Horse) in 1950.
- 5th King Edward's Own Horse: Formed by merging 11th (King Edward's Own) Lancers (Probyn's Horse) and 12th Cavalry. Renamed Probyn's Horse (5th King Edward's Own) in 1927; Probyn's Horse (5th King Edward VII's Own) in 1937. Allotted to Pakistan in 1947. Renamed 5th Horse in 1950.
- 6th Duke of Connaught's Own Lancers: Formed by merging 13th Duke of Connaught's Own Lancers (Watson's Horse) and 16th Cavalry. Renamed as 6th Duke of Connaught's Own Lancers (Watson's Horse) in 1927. Allotted to Pakistan in 1947. Renamed 6th Lancers in 1956.
- 7th Light Cavalry: Late 28th Light Cavalry. Allotted to India in 1947.
- 8th King George's Own Light Cavalry: Formed by merging 26th King George's Own Light Cavalry and 30th Lancers (Gordon's Horse). Renamed 8th King George V's Own Light Cavalry in 1937 – went to India in 1947 and became 8th Light Cavalry in 1950
- 9th Royal Deccan Horse: Formed by merging 20th Deccan Horse and 29th Lancers (Deccan Horse). Renamed The Royal Deccan Horse (9th Horse) in 1927. Allotted to India in 1947. Renamed The Deccan Horse in 1950.
- 10th Queen Victoria's Own Corps of Guides Cavalry (Frontier Force): Cavalry element of Queen Victoria's Own Corps of Guides (Frontier Force) (Lumsden). Renamed The Guides Cavalry (10th Queen Victoria's Own Frontier Force) in 1927. Allotted to Pakistan in 1947. Renamed The Guides Cavalry (Frontier Force) in 1956.
- 11th Prince Albert Victor's Own Cavalry (Frontier Force): Formed by merging 21st Prince Albert Victor's Own Cavalry (Frontier Force) (Daly's Horse) and 23rd Cavalry (Frontier Force). Renamed Prince Albert Victor's Own Cavalry (11th Frontier Force) in 1927. Allotted to Pakistan in 1947. Renamed 11th Cavalry (Frontier Force) in 1956.
- 12th Cavalry (Frontier Force): Formed by merging 22nd Sam Browne's Cavalry (Frontier Force) and 25th Cavalry (Frontier Force). Renamed Sam Browne's Cavalry (12th Frontier Force) in 1927. Absorbed into Indian Armoured Corps Training Centre in 1940. Re-raised in the Pakistan Army in 1985.
- 13th Duke of Connaught's Own Bombay Lancers: Formed by merging 31st Duke of Connaught's Own Lancers and 32nd Lancers. Renamed 13th Duke of Connaught's Own Lancers in 1927. Allotted to Pakistan in 1947. Renamed 13th Lancers in 1956.
- 14th Prince of Wales's Own Scinde Horse – formed by merging 35th Scinde Horse and 36th Jacob's Horse. Renamed The Scinde Horse (14th Prince of Wales's Own Cavalry) in 1927. Allotted to India in 1947. Renamed 14th Horse in 1950.
- 15th Lancers: Formed by merging 17th Cavalry and 37th Lancers (Baluch Horse). Absorbed into Indian Armoured Corps Training Centre in 1940. Re-raised in both Indian and Pakistan Armies in 1985.
- 16th Light Cavalry: Late 27th Light Cavalry. Allotted to India in 1947.
- 17th Queen Victoria's Own Poona Horse: Formed by merging 33rd Queen's Own Light Cavalry and 34th Prince Albert Victor's Own Poona Horse. Renamed The Poona Horse (17th Queen Victoria's Own Cavalry) in 1927. Allotted to India in 1947. Renamed 17th Horse in 1950.
- 18th King Edward's Own Cavalry: Formed by merging 6th King Edward's Own Cavalry and 7th Hariana Lancers. Renamed 18th King Edward VII's Own Cavalry in 1936. Allotted to India in 1947. Renamed 18th Cavalry in 1950.
- 19th King George's Own Lancers: Formed by merging 18th King George's Own Lancers and 19th Lancers (Fane's Horse), Renamed 19th King George V's Own Lancers in 1937. Allotted to Pakistan in 1947. Renamed 19th Lancers in 1956.
- 20th Lancers: Formed by merging 14th Murray's Jat Lancers and 15th Lancers (Cureton's Multanis). Absorbed into Indian Armoured Corps Training Centre in 1940. Re-raised in 1955-1956 in both Indian and Pakistan Armies.
- 21st King George’s Own Central India Horse: Formed by merging 38th King George's Own Central India Horse and 39th King George's Own Central India Horse. Renamed The Central India Horse (21st King George V's Own Horse) in 1937. Allotted to India in 1947. Renamed The Central India Horse in 1950.

=== Auxiliary ===
- The Assam Valley Light Horse
- The Bihar Light Horse
- The Bombay Light Horse
- The Calcutta Light Horse
- The Chota Nagpur Regiment
- The Punjab Light Horse
- The Southern Provinces Mounted Rifles
- The Surma Valley Light Horse
- The United Provinces Horse (Northern Regiment)
- The United Provinces Horse (Southern Regiment)

== Infantry ==
=== Regular ===
- 1st Punjab Regiment: Allotted to Pakistan in 1947. Merged with 14th, 15th, and 16th Punjab Regiments to form Punjab Regiment in 1956.
  - 1st Battalion: Late 62nd Punjabis.
  - 2nd Battalion: Late 66th Punjabis.
  - 3rd Battalion: Late 76th Punjabis.
  - 4th Battalion: Late 1st Brahmans. Disbanded 1931.
  - 5th Battalion: Late 82nd Punjabis.
  - 10th (Training) Battalion: Late 84th Punjabis.
  - 11th (Territorial) Battalion: Formed 1922, disbanded 1941.
- 2nd Punjab Regiment: Allotted to India in 1947. Renamed Punjab Regiment.
  - 1st Battalion: Formed by renaming 1st Battalion, 67th Punjabis.
  - 2nd Battalion: Late 69th Punjabis.
  - 3rd Battalion: Late 72nd Punjabis.
  - 4th Battalion: Late 74th Punjabis. Disbanded 1938.
  - 5th Battalion: Late 87th Punjabis.
  - 10th (Training) Battalion: Formed by renaming 2nd Battalion, 67th Punjabis.
- 3rd Madras Regiment: Disbanded 1928. Re-raised 1941. Renamed The Madras Regiment in 1945. Allotted to India in 1947.
  - 1st Battalion: Late 73rd Carnatic Infantry. Disbanded 1928.
  - 2nd Battalion: Late 75th Carnatic Infantry. Disbanded 1926.
  - 3rd Battalion: Late 79th Carnatic Infantry. Disbanded 1923.
  - 4th Battalion: Late 83rd Wallajahabad Light Infantry. Disbanded 1923.
  - 10th (Training) Battalion: Late 86th Carnatic Infantry. Disbanded 1926.
  - 11th (Madras) (Territorial) Battalion: Disbanded 1928. Reformed 1933. Disbanded 1941.
  - 12th (Malabar) (Territorial) Battalion: Disbanded 1928, Reformed 1933. Disbanded 1941.
  - 13th (Malabar) (Territorial) Battalion: Disbanded 1928. Reformed 1933. Disbanded 1941.
  - 14th (Coorg) (Territorial) Battalion: Disbanded 1928. Reformed 1929. Disbanded 1941.
- 4th Bombay Grenadiers: Redesignated The Indian Grenadiers in 1945. Allotted to India in 1947. Renamed The Grenadiers in 1950.
  - 1st Battalion: Late 101st Grenadiers.
  - 2nd Battalion: Late 102nd King Edward's Own Grenadiers.
  - 3rd Battalion: Late 108th Infantry. Disbanded 1930. Reformed 1940.
  - 4th Battalion: Late 109th Infantry. Disbanded 1923. Reformed 1941.
  - 5th Battalion: Late 112th Infantry. Disbanded 1923. Reformed 1941.
  - 10th (Training) Battalion: Late 113th Infantry. Merged with 10th (Training) Battalion, 9th Jat Regiment.
  - 11th (Territorial) Battalion: Disbanded in 1942.
- 5th Mahratta Light Infantry: Redesignated The Mahratta Light Infantry in 1945. Allotted to India in 1947. Renamed Maratha Light Infantry in 1948.
  - 1st Battalion: Late 103rd Mahratta Light Infantry.
  - 2nd Battalion: Late 105th Mahratta Light Infantry.
  - 3rd Battalion: Late 110th Mahratta Light Infantry.
  - 4th Battalion: Late 116th Mahrattas.
  - 5th (Royal) Battalion: Late 117th Mahrattas.
  - 10th (Training) Battalion: Late 114th Mahrattas.
  - 11th (Territorial) Battalion: Disbanded 1941.
  - 12th (Territorial) Battalion: Formed 1939. Disbanded 1941.
- 6th Rajputana Rifles: Renamed The Rajputana Rifles in 1945. Allotted to India in 1947.
  - 1st Battalion (Wellesley's): Late 104th Wellesley's Rifles.
  - 2nd (Prince of Wales's Own) Battalion: Late 120th Rajputana Infantry.
  - 3rd (Prince of Wales's Own) Battalion: Late 122nd Rajputana Infantry.
  - 4th Battalion (Outram's): Late 123rd Outram's Rifles.
  - 5th Battalion (Napier's): Late 125th Napier's Rifles.
  - 10th (Training) Battalion: Late 13th Rajputs (The Shekhawati Regiment).
  - 11th (Territorial) Battalion: Formed 1928. Disbanded 1941.
  - 12th (Territorial) Battalion: Formed 1940. Disbanded 1941.
- 7th Rajput Regiment: Renamed The Rajput Regiment in 1945. Allotted to India in 1947.
  - 1st (Queen Victoria's Own Light Infantry) Battalion: Late 2nd Queen Victoria's Own Rajput Light Infantry.
  - 2nd (Prince Albert Victor's) Battalion: Late 4th Prince Albert Victor's Rajputs.
  - 3rd (Duke of Connaught's Own) Battalion: Late 7th Duke of Connaught's Own Rajputs.
  - 4th Battalion: Late 8th Rajputs.
  - 5th Battalion: Late 11th Rajputs. Disbanded 1941.
  - 10th (Training) Battalion: Late 16th Rajputs (The Lucknow Regiment).
  - 11th (Territorial) Battalion: Disbanded 1941.
  - 12th (Territorial) Battalion: Formed in 1940. Disbanded 1941.
- 8th Punjab Regiment: Allotted to Pakistan in 1947. Absorbed into the Baluch Regiment in 1956.
  - 1st Battalion: Formed by renaming 1st Battalion, 89th Punjabis. Disbanded 1942. Reformed 1946.
  - 2nd Battalion: Late 90th Punjabis.
  - 3rd Battalion: Late 91st Punjabis (Light Infantry).
  - 4th Battalion: Late 92nd Punjabis.
  - 5th Battalion: Late 93rd Burma Infantry.
  - 10th (Training) Battalion: Formed by renaming 2nd Battalion, 89th Punjabis.
- 9th Jat Regiment: Renamed The Jat Regiment in 1945. Allotted to India in 1947.
  - 1st (Royal) Battalion: Formed by renaming 1st Battalion, 6th Jat Light Infantry.
  - 2nd (Mooltan) Battalion: Late 119th Infantry (The Mooltan Regiment). Disbanded in 1942.
  - 3rd Battalion: Late 10th Jats.
  - 4th Battalion: Late 18th Infantry. Became 10th (Training) Battalion. Merged with 10th (Training) Battalion, 4th Bombay Grenadiers.
  - 10th (Training) Battalion: Formed by renaming 2nd Battalion, 6th Jat Light Infantry.
  - 11th (Territorial) Battalion: Disbanded 1941.
  - 12th (Territorial) Battalion: Formed 1940. Disbanded in1941.
- 10th Baluch Regiment: Renamed The Baluch Regiment in 1945. Allotted to Pakistan in 1947. Absorbed 8th Punjab Regiment and The Bahawalpur Regiment in 1956. Renamed Baloch Regiment in 1991.
  - 1st (Duchess of Connaught's Own) Battalion: Formed by renaming 1st Battalion, 124th Duchess of Connaught's Own Baluchistan Infantry.
  - 2nd Battalion: Late 126th Baluchistan Infantry. Disbanded 1942. Reformed in 1946.
  - 3rd (Queen Mary's Own) Battalion: Late 127th Queen Mary's Own Baluch Light Infantry.
  - 4th (Duke of Connaught's Own) Battalion: Late 129th Duke of Connaught's Own Baluchis.
  - 5th (King George's Own) Battalion (Jacob's Rifles): Late 130th King George's Own Baluchis (Jacob's Rifles).
  - 10th (Training) Battalion: Formed by renaming 2nd Battalion, 124th Duchess of Connaught's Own Baluchistan Infantry.
- 11th Sikh Regiment: Renamed The Sikh Regiment in 1945. Allotted to India in 1947.
  - 1st Battalion: Late 14th King George's Own Ferozepore Sikhs.
  - 2nd Battalion: Late 15th Ludhiana Sikhs.
  - 3rd Battalion: Late 45th Rattray's Sikhs.
  - 4th Battalion: Late 36th Sikhs.
  - 5th Battalion: Late 47th Duke of Connaught's Own Sikhs
  - 10th (Training) Battalion: Late 35th Sikhs.
- 12th Frontier Force Regiment: Renamed The Frontier Force Regiment in 1945. Allotted to Pakistan in 1947. Absorbed Frontier Force Rifles and Pathan Regiment in 1956.
  - 1st Battalion: Late 51st Sikhs (Frontier Force).
  - 2nd Battalion: Late 52nd Sikhs (Frontier Force). Disbanded 1942. Reformed 1946.
  - 3rd Battalion: Late 53rd Sikhs (Frontier Force).
  - 4th Battalion: Late 54th Sikhs (Frontier Force).
  - 5th Battalion (Guides): Formed by renaming 1st Battalion, Queen Victoria's Own Corps of Guides Infantry (Frontier Force).
  - 10th (Training) Battalion: Formed by renaming 2nd Battalion, Queen Victoria's Own Corps of Guides Infantry (Frontier Force).
  - 11th (Territorial) Battalion: Disbanded 1941.
- 13th Frontier Force Rifles: Renamed The Frontier Force Rifles in 1945. Allotted to Pakistan in 1947. Absorbed into Frontier Force Regiment in 1956.
  - 1st Battalion (Coke's): Late 55th Coke's Rifles (Frontier Force).
  - 2nd Battalion: Formed by renaming 1st Battalion, 56th Punjabi Rifles (Frontier Force).
  - 4th Battalion (Wilde's): Late 57th Wilde's Rifles.
  - 5th Battalion (Vaughan's): Late 58th Vaughan's Rifles (Frontier Force).
  - 6th (Royal Scinde) Battalion: Late 59th Royal Scinde Rifles (Frontier Force).
  - 10th (Training) Battalion: Formed by renaming 2nd Battalion, 56th Punjabi Rifles (Frontier Force).
  - 11th (Territorial) Battalion: Disbanded 1941.
- 14th Punjab Regiment: Allotted to Pakistan in 1947. Merged with 1st, 15th, and 16th Punjab Regiments to form Punjab Regiment in 1956.
  - 1st Battalion: Late 19th Punjabis.
  - 2nd (Duke of Cambridge's Own) Battalion: Late 20th Duke of Cambridge's Own Infantry (Brownlow's Punjabis).
  - 3rd Battalion: Late 22nd Punjabis.
  - 4th Battalion: Late 24th Punjabis.
  - 5th (Pathans) Battalion: Late 40th Pathans.
  - 10th (Training) Battalion: Late 21st Punjabis.
  - 11th (Territorial) Battalion: Disbanded 1941.
  - 12th (Territorial) Battalion: Formed 1939. Disbanded 1941.
- 15th Punjab Regiment: Allotted to Pakistan in 1947. Merged with 1st, 14th, and 16th Punjab Regiments to form Punjab Regiment in 1956.
  - 1st Battalion: Late 25th Punjabis.
  - 2nd Battalion: Late 26th Punjabis. Disbanded 1942. Reformed 1946.
  - 3rd Battalion: Late 27th Punjabis.
  - 4th Battalion: Late 28th Punjabis.
  - 10th (Training) Battalion: Late 29th Punjabis
  - 11th (Territorial) Battalion: Disbanded 1941.
  - 12th (Territorial) Battalion: Formed 1939. Disbanded 1941.
- 16th Punjab Regiment: Allotted to Pakistan in 1947. Merged with 1st, 14th, and 15th Punjab Regiments to form Punjab Regiment in 1956.
  - 1st Battalion: Late 30th Punjabis.
  - 2nd Battalion: Late 31st Punjabis. Disbanded 1942. Reformed 1946.
  - 3rd Battalion: Late 33rd Punjabis. Disbanded 1942. Reformed 1946.
  - 4th Battalion: Late 9th Bhopal Infantry.
  - 10th (Training) Battalion: Late 46th Punjabis.
- 17th Dogra Regiment: Renamed The Dogra Regiment in 1945. Allotted to India in 1947.
  - 1st Battalion: Late 37th (Prince of Wales's Own) Dogras.
  - 2nd Battalion: Late 38th Dogras. Disbanded 1942. Reformed 1946.
  - 3rd Battalion: Formed by renaming 1st Battalion, 41st Dogras. Disbanded 1942. Reformed 1946.
  - 10th (Training) Battalion: Formed by renaming 2nd Battalion, 41st Dogras.
  - 11th (Territorial) Battalion: Disbanded 1941.
  - 12th (Territorial) Battalion: Formed 1939. Disbanded 1941.
- 18th Royal Garhwal Rifles: Late 39th Royal Garhwal Rifles. Renamed The Royal Garhwal Rifles in 1945. Allotted to India in 1947. Renamed Garhwal Rifles in 1950.
  - 1st Battalion
  - 2nd Battalion: Disbanded 1942. Reformed 1946.
  - 3rd Battalion
  - 10th (Training) Battalion: Formed from 4th Battalion.
  - 11th (Territorial) Battalion: Disbanded 1942.
- 19th Hyderabad Regiment: Renamed The Kumaon Regiment in 1945. Allotted to India in 1947.
  - 1st Battalion (Russell's): Late 94th Russell's Infantry.
  - 2nd (Berar) Battalion: Late 96th Berar Infantry.
  - 3rd Battalion: Late 97th Deccan Infantry. Disbanded 1931.
  - 4th Battalion: Late 98th Infantry. Disbanded 1942.
  - 5th Battalion: Late 99th Deccan Infantry. Disbanded 1924. Reformed 1940. Disbanded 1946.
  - 1st Kumaon Rifles: Formed by renaming 1st Battalion, 50th Kumaon Rifles
  - 2nd Kumaon Rifles: Formed by renaming 2nd Battalion, 50th Kumaon Rifles. Disbanded 1923.
  - 10th (Training) Battalion (Russell's): Late 95th Russell's Infantry
  - 11th (Territorial) Battalion: Formed 1922. Disbanded 1941.
- 20th Burma Rifles: Allotted to Burma on separation from India in 1937.
  - 1st Battalion: Formed from 1st Battalion, 70th Burma Rifles. Disbanded 1942. Reformed 1945.
  - 2nd Battalion: Formed from 2nd Battalion, 70th Burma Rifles.
  - 3rd (Kachin) Battalion: Formed from 1st Battalion, 85th Burman Rifles.
  - 4th (Chin) Battalion: Formed from 2nd Battalion, 85th Burma Rifles.
  - 10th (Training) Battalion: Disbanded 1937. Reformed 1940. Disbanded 1942.
  - 11th (Territorial) Battalion: Disbanded 1942.
  - 12th (Territorial) Battalion: Disbanded 1942.
- 1st King George V's Own Gurkha Rifles (The Malaun Regiment) — allocated to India in 1947, became 'Gorkha' in 1949, and finally 1st Gorkha Rifles (The Malaun Regiment) in 1950
  - Home Station, in Dharamsala
  - 1st Battalion
  - 2nd Battalion
  - 3rd Battalion — raised in 1917 but disbanded in 1921, reformed in 1940 and disbanded again in 1946
- 2nd King Edward VII's Own Gurkha Rifles (The Sirmoor Rifles) — allocated to the United Kingdom in 1947
  - Home Station, in Dehradun
  - 1st Battalion
  - 2nd Battalion — disbanded in 1942, reformed in 1946
  - 3rd Battalion — raised in 1917 but disbanded in 1920, reformed in 1940 and disbanded again in 1946
- 3rd Queen Alexandra's Own Gurkha Rifles — allocated to India in 1947, became 'Gorkha' in 1949, and finally 3rd Gorkha Rifles in 1950
  - Home Station, in Almora and Lansdowne
  - 1st Battalion
  - 2nd Battalion
  - 3rd Battalion — raised in 1917 but disbanded in 1920, reformed in 1940
  - 4th Battalion — raised in 1916 but disbanded in 1922, reformed in 1941 and disbanded again in 1947
- 4th Prince of Wales's Own Gurkha Rifles — allocated to India in 1947, became 'Gorkha' in 1949, and finally 4th Gorkha Rifles in 1950
  - Home Station, in Bakloh
  - 1st Battalion
  - 2nd Battalion
  - 3rd Battalion — formed in 1940
- 5th Royal Gurkha Rifles (Frontier Force) — allocated to India in 1947, became 'Gorkha' in 1949, and finally 5th Gorkha Rifles in 1950
  - Home Station, in Abbottabad
  - 1st Battalion
  - 2nd Battalion
  - 3rd Battalion — raised in 1916 but disbanded in 1921, reformed in 1940
- 6th Gurkha Rifles — allocated to the United Kingdom in 1947, became 6th Queen Elizabeth's Own Gurkha Rifles in 1959
  - Home Station, in Abbottabad
  - 1st Battalion
  - 2nd Battalion
  - 3rd Battalion — raised in 1917 but disbanded in 1921, reformed in 1940 and disbanded again in 1948
- 7th Gurkha Rifles — allocated to the United Kingdom in 1947, became 7th Duke of Edinburgh's Own Gurkha Rifles in 1959
  - Home Station, in Quetta
  - 1st Battalion
  - 2nd Battalion
  - 3rd Battalion — raised in 1917 but disbanded in 1921, reformed in 1940 and disbanded again in 1943, reformed once more in 1946 but disbanded two years later in 1948
- 8th Gurkha Rifles — allocated to India in 1947, became 'Gorkha' in 1949
  - Home Station, in Quetta and Shillong
  - 1st Battalion
  - 2nd Battalion
  - 3rd Battalion — raised in 1917 but disbanded in 1921, reformed in 1940 and disbanded again in 1946
- 9th Gurkha Rifles — allocated to India in 1947, became 'Gorkha' in 1949
  - Home Station, in Dehradun
  - 1st Battalion
  - 2nd Battalion
- 10th Gurkha Rifles — allocated to the United Kingdom in 1947, became 10th Princess Mary's Own Gurkha Rifles in 1949
  - Home Headquarters, in Quetta
  - 1st Battalion
  - 2nd Battalion

=== Auxiliary Force (India) ===
- The Allahabad Rifles
- The Assam Bengal Railway Battalion
- The Baluchistan Volunteer Rifle Corps
- The Bangalore Contingent
- The Bengal & North West Railway Battalion
- The Bengal Nagpur Railway Battalion
- The Bombay, Baroda and Central India Railway Regiment
- The Bombay Volunteer Rifles Corps
- The Burma Railways Battalion
- The Calcutta and Presidency Battalion
- The Calcutta Presidency Battalion
- The Calcutta Scottish
- The Cawnpore Rifles
- The Coorg and Mysore Company
- The Delhi Contingent
- The East Coast Battalion
- The East Indian Railway Regiment
- The Eastern Bengal Company
- The Eastern Bengal Railway Battalion
- The Great Indian Peninsula Railway Regiment
- The Hyderabad Rifles
- The Lucknow Rifles
- The Lucknow Volunteer Rifles
- The Madras and Southern Mahratta Railway Rifles
- The Madras Guards
- The Mussourie Battalion
- The Nagpur Rifles
- The Naini Tal Volunteer Rifles
- The Nilgiri Malabar Battalion
- The Northern Bengal Mounted Rifles
- The North Western Railway Battalion
- The Oudh and Rohilkhand Railway Battalion
- The Poona Rifles
- The Punjab Rifles
- The Rangoon Battalion
- The Simla Rifles
- The Sind Rifles
- The South Indian Railway Battalion
- The Tenasserim Battalion
- The Upper Burma Battalion

== Indian Mountain Artillery ==
Following the absorption of the Presidency armies into the Royal Artillery and Royal Horse Artillery, there were no 'field' units of the Indian artillery. The Indian artillery only maintained mountain artillery units, while the Royal Artillery provided the other arms. The units below have their titles in 1922 or those used before if they were changed later:

Brigades (till 1938)/Regiments

- 20th Indian Pack Artillery Brigade
- 21st Indian Pack Artillery Brigade
- 22nd Indian Pack Artillery Brigade
- 23rd Indian Pack Artillery Brigade
- 24th Indian Pack Artillery Brigade
- 25th Indian Pack Artillery Brigade

Batteries (Separate)

- 101 Royal (Kohat) Pack Battery (Frontier Force)
- 102 (Derajat) Pack Battery (FF)
- 103 (Peshawar) Pack Battery (FF)
- 104 (Hazara) Pack Battery (FF)
- 105 (Bombay) Pack Battery
- 106 (Jacob's) Pack Battery
- 107 (Bengal) Pack Battery
- 108 (Lahore) Pack Battery
- 109 (Murree) Pack Battery
- 110 (Abbottabad) Pack Battery
- 111 (Dehra Dun) Pack Battery
- 112 (Poonch) Pack Battery
- 113 (Dardoni) Pack Battery
- 114 (Rajputana) Pack Battery
- 115 (Jhelum) Pack Battery
- 116 (Zhob) Pack Bty
- 117 (Nowshera) Pack Battery
- 118 (Sohan) Pack Battery
- 119 (Maymyo) Pack Battery

== Indian Territorial Force ==
- University Training Corps
- Urban Infantry

== The Frontier Corps ==
- Gilgit Scouts
- Chitral Scouts
- Kurram Militia
- Tochi Scouts
- South Waziristan Scouts
- Zhob Militia
- Pishin Scouts (1946–47)
- Khyber Rifles

== Military Police and North-East Frontier units ==
- Malabar Special Police
- Burma Military Police
- Eastern Frontier Rifles (Bengal Military Police)
- Assam Rifles

== Services ==
- The Army Bearer Corps
- The Army Clothing Department
- The Army Hospital Corps
- The Army Remount Department
- The Army Veterinary Corps
- The Indian Medical Department
- The Indian Ordnance Department
- The Military Farms Department
- Supply and Transport Corps

== Support Arms ==
- 1st King George V's Own Bengal Sappers and Miners (numeral omitted 1923)
- 2nd Queen Victoria's Own Madras Sappers and Miners (numeral omitted 1923)
- 3rd Royal Bombay Sappers and Miners (numeral omitted 1923)
- 4th Burma Sappers and Miners (numeral omitted 1923)
- 1st Madras Pioneers
- 2nd Bombay Pioneers
- 3rd Sikh Pioneers
- 4th Hazara Pioneers

== Indian State Forces ==
- (see separately)

== Wartime Units and others formed between 1922 and 1947 ==
- Field Artillery
- Women's Army Corps (India)
- 42nd Cavalry Regiment
- 43rd Cavalry
- 44th Cavalry
- 45th Cavalry
- 46th Cavalry
- 47th Cavalry
- 48th Cavalry
- Indian Long Range Squadron
- 21st Regiment
- 22nd Regiment
- 23rd Regiment
- 24th Regiment
- 25th Ajmer Regiment
- Kumaon Rifles
- 151 (British) Parachute Battalion
- 152 (Indian) Parachute Battalion
- 153 (Gurkha) Parachute Battalion
- 154 (Gurkha) Parachute Battalion
- Indian Parachute Regiment
- Indian Ordnance and Mechanical Engineers
- Indian Hospital Corps formed by amalgamation of Army Hospital and Nursing Corps and the Army Bearer Corps
- Indian Medical Service formed by amalgamation of the Bengal, Bombay and Madras Medical Services
- Indian Army Medical Corps formed by amalgamation of the Indian Medical Service, Indian Medical Department, and Indian Hospital Corps

== See also ==
- List of regiments of the Indian Army (1903)
- List of regiments of the Indian Army
- Royal Engineers Museum Indian Sappers (1740–1947)
