= 55th Indian Brigade =

- Active: January 1918 – 1921
- Country: British India
- Allegiance: British Crown
- Branch: British Indian Army
- Type: Infantry
- Size: Brigade
- Part of: 18th Indian Division
- Engagements: First World War Mesopotamian Campaign Battle of Sharqat

Commanders
- Notable commanders: Br.-Gen. G.M. Morris

The 55th Indian Brigade was an infantry brigade of the British Indian Army that saw active service with the Indian Army during the First World War. It took part in the Mesopotamian campaign and formed part of the occupation force for Iraq post-war.

== History ==
The 55th Indian Brigade started forming in Mesopotamia from January 1918 as part of the 18th Indian Division. The brigade was formed from battalions transferred directly from India so time was needed for them to become acclimatized. It remained with the division for the rest of the war, taking part in the action at Fat-ha Gorge on the Little Zab (23–26 October 1918) and the Battle of Sharqat (28–30 October 1918).

At the end of the war, the 18th Division was chosen to form part of the occupation force for Iraq. It took part in the Iraq Rebellion in 1920. The division, and the brigade, was broken up in the following year.

== Order of battle ==
The brigade had the following composition in the First World War:

- 1/5th Battalion, East Surrey Regiment (joined on 10 February 1918 from Muttra, 7th Meerut Divisional Area)
- 116th Mahrattas (joined from Corps Troops in December 1917)
- 1st Battalion, 10th Jats (joined in January 1918 from Bannu Brigade; left in September 1918 to join the British 22nd Division)
- 1st Battalion, 94th Russell's Infantry (joined in January 1918 from 2nd (Nowshera) Brigade, 1st (Peshawar) Division; left for Corps Troops in September before joining 52nd Indian Brigade, 17th Indian Division in November)
- 87th Punjabis (transferred from Corps Troops in September 1918)
- 1st Battalion, 5th Gurkha Rifles (Frontier Force) (joined in December 1918 from 42nd Indian Brigade, 15th Indian Division)
- 239th Machine Gun Company
- 55th Light Trench Mortar Battery (joined in February 1918)

== Commanders ==
The brigade was commanded from 5 January 1918 by Brigadier-General A. J. Campbell. On 2 March 1918, Brigadier-General G. M. Morris took command.

== Bibliography ==
- Perry, F.W. (1993). Order of Battle of Divisions Part 5B. Indian Army Divisions. Newport: Ray Westlake Military Books. ISBN 1-871167-23-X.
