= 52nd Indian Brigade =

- Active: 13 September 1917 – August 1923
- Country: British India
- Allegiance: British Crown
- Branch: British Indian Army
- Type: Infantry
- Size: Brigade
- Part of: 17th Indian Division
- Engagements: First World War Mesopotamian Campaign Battle of Sharqat

The 52nd Indian Brigade was an infantry brigade of the British Indian Army that saw active service with the Indian Army during the First World War. It took part in the Mesopotamian campaign and formed part of the occupation force for Iraq post-war. It was not reformed for the Second World War.

== History ==
The 52nd Brigade was formed in Mesopotamia on 13 September 1917 in 15th Indian Division. It was formed from battalions that had already been in Mesopotamia for some months, guarding lines of communications. In October 1917 it was transferred to 17th Indian Division where it remained for the rest of the war, taking part in the action at Fat-ha Gorge on the Little Zab (23–26 October 1918) and the Battle of Sharqat (28–30 October 1918).

At the end of the war, the 17th Division was chosen to form part of the occupation force for Iraq. It took part in the Iraq Rebellion in 1920. In August 1923, the division was reduced to a single brigade; the last British troops left in March 1927 and the Indian ones in November 1928.

== Order of battle ==
The brigade had the following composition in the First World War:

- 1/6th Battalion, Hampshire Regiment (joined from Ambala Brigade, 16th Indian Division in August 1917)
- 45th Rattray's Sikhs (joined from Corps Troops in August 1917)
- 84th Punjabis (joined from Corps Troops in August 1917; left in September 1918 and joined the British 28th Division)
- 1st Battalion, 113th Infantry (joined from Corps Troops in August 1917)
- 1st Battalion, 94th Russell's Infantry (joined from Corps Troops in November 1918)
- 258th Machine Gun Company
- 52nd Light Trench Mortar Battery (joined in February 1918)

== Commander ==
The 52nd Brigade was commanded from formation by Brigadier-General F.A. Andrew.

== Bibliography ==
- Kempton, Chris (2003b). 'Loyalty & Honour', The Indian Army September 1939 – August 1947. Vol. Part II Brigades. Milton Keynes: The Military Press. ISBN 0-85420-238-2.
- Perry, F.W. (1993). Order of Battle of Divisions Part 5B. Indian Army Divisions. Newport: Ray Westlake Military Books. ISBN 1-871167-23-X.
