= 7th Regiment of Bombay Native Infantry =

7th Regiment of Bombay Native Infantry may refer to:

- 113th Infantry which was the 1st Battalion
- 114th Mahrattas which was the 2nd Battalion
