= Rakesh Singh =

Rakesh Singh may refer to:

- Chaudhary Rakesh Singh Chaturvedi (born 1962), Indian politician
- Rakesh Singh (politician) (born 1962), Indian politician
- Rakesh Singh (soldier) (1970–1992), Indian Army officer
- Rakesh Pratap Singh (born 1976), Indian politician
- Rakesh Singh (journalist) (died 2020), journalist killed in India
- Kunwar Sarvesh Kumar Singh, also known as Rakesh Singh (born 1952), Indian businessman and member of the Lok Sabha, the lower house of the Parliament of India, for Moradabad (from 2014)

== See also ==
- Rakesh Singh Baghel, Indian politician
- Rakesh Singh Malhan (1970–1992), Indian Army officer
- Rakesh Kumar Singh Bhadauria or R. K. S. Bhadauria, former Indian Chief of the Air Staff
- Rakesh Singha, Indian politician
