= 51st Indian Brigade =

- Active: August 1917 – August 1923
- Country: British India
- Allegiance: British Crown
- Branch: British Indian Army
- Type: Infantry
- Size: Brigade
- Part of: 17th Indian Division
- Engagements: First World War Mesopotamian Campaign Battle of Sharqat

Commanders
- Notable commanders: Br.-Gen. R.J.T. Hildyard

The 51st Indian Brigade was an infantry brigade of the British Indian Army that saw active service with the Indian Army during the First World War. It took part in the Mesopotamian campaign and formed part of the occupation force for Iraq post-war.

== History ==
The 51st Indian Brigade started forming in Mesopotamia from August 1917 as part of the 17th Indian Division. It was formed from battalions that had already been in Mesopotamia for some months, guarding lines of communications. It remained with the division for the rest of the war, taking part in the action at Fat-ha Gorge on the Little Zab (23–26 October 1918) and the Battle of Sharqat (28–30 October 1918).

At the end of the war, the 17th Division was chosen to form part of the occupation force for Iraq. It took part in the Iraq Rebellion in 1920. In August 1923, the division was reduced to a single brigade; the last British troops left in March 1927 and the Indian ones in November 1928.

== Order of battle ==
The brigade had the following composition in the First World War:

- 1st Battalion, Highland Light Infantry (joined from Corps Troops in September 1917)
- 1st Battalion, 2nd Queen Victoria's Own Rajput Light Infantry (joined from Corps Troops in September 1917; left in September 1918 for the 67th Brigade, British 22nd Division)
- 14th King George's Own Ferozepore Sikhs (joined from 50th Indian Brigade, 15th Indian Division in October 1917; to Corps Troops in November 1918)
- 1st Battalion, 10th Gurkha Rifles (joined from Corps Troops in August 1917)
- 257th Machine Gun Company
- 51st Light Trench Mortar Battery (joined in February 1918)

== Commander ==
The brigade was commanded from formation by Brigadier-General R.J.T. Hildyard.

== Bibliography ==
- Perry, F.W. (1993). Order of Battle of Divisions Part 5B. Indian Army Divisions. Newport: Ray Westlake Military Books. ISBN 1-871167-23-X.
