= 54th Indian Brigade =

- Active: December 1917 – 1921
- Country: British India
- Allegiance: British Crown
- Branch: British Indian Army
- Type: Infantry
- Size: Brigade
- Part of: 18th Indian Division
- Engagements: First World War Mesopotamian Campaign Battle of Sharqat

The 54th Indian Brigade was an infantry brigade of the British Indian Army that saw active service with the Indian Army during the First World War. It took part in the Mesopotamian campaign and formed part of the occupation force for Iraq post-war. It was not reformed for the Second World War.

== History ==
The 54th Indian Brigade started forming in Mesopotamia from December 1917 as part of the 18th Indian Division, joining the division when it was formed on 24 December 1917. The brigade was formed from battalions transferred directly from India so time was needed for them to become acclimatized. It remained with the division for the rest of the war, taking part in the action at Fat-ha Gorge on the Little Zab (23–26 October 1918) and the Battle of Sharqat (28–30 October 1918).

At the end of the war, the 18th Division was chosen to form part of the occupation force for Iraq. It took part in the Iraq Rebellion in 1920. The division, and the brigade, was broken up in the following year.

== Order of battle ==
The brigade had the following composition in the First World War:

- 1/5th Battalion, Queen's Own (Royal West Kent Regiment) (joined in December 1917 from Jubbulpore Brigade, 5th (Mhow) Division)
- 1st Battalion, 39th Garhwal Rifles (joined in December 1917 from 2nd Quetta Brigade, 4th (Quetta) Division)
- 25th Punjabis (joined in December 1917 from Bannu Brigade; left in September 1918 to join the British 22nd Division)
- 52nd Sikhs (Frontier Force) (joined in December 1917 from 1st (Peshawar) Brigade, 1st (Peshawar) Division)
- 238th Machine Gun Company
- 54th Light Trench Mortar Battery (joined in February 1918)

== Commander ==
The brigade was commanded from 20 December 1917 by Brigadier-General M.R.W. Nightingale.

== Bibliography ==
- Kempton, Chris (2003b). 'Loyalty & Honour', The Indian Army September 1939 – August 1947. Vol. Part II Brigades. Milton Keynes: The Military Press. ISBN 0-85420-238-2.
- Perry, F.W. (1993). Order of Battle of Divisions Part 5B. Indian Army Divisions. Newport: Ray Westlake Military Books. ISBN 1-871167-23-X.
