= 50th Indian Brigade =

- Active: 20 August 1917 – March 1919
- Country: British India
- Allegiance: British Crown
- Branch: British Indian Army
- Type: Infantry
- Size: Brigade
- Part of: 15th Indian Division
- Engagements: First World War Mesopotamian Campaign Capture of Ramadi Action of Khan Baghdadi

The 50th Indian Brigade was an infantry brigade of the British Indian Army that saw active service with the Indian Army during the First World War. It served in the Mesopotamian Campaign on the Euphrates Front throughout its existence. It was not reformed for the Second World War.

== History ==
Formation

The 50th Indian Brigade was formed in Mesopotamia on 20 August 1917 as part of the newly formed 15th Indian Division. It was made up of battalions that had already been in Mesopotamia for some months, guarding lines of communications. From late August to mid-September it was attached to the 3rd (Lahore) Division before joining the 17th Indian Division. It was replaced in the 15th Indian Division by the 34th Indian Brigade, ex 17th Indian Division.

15th Indian Division

The brigade remained with the division on the Euphrates Front until the end of the war. It took part in the Capture of Ramadi (28 and 29 September 1917), the Occupation of Hīt (9 March 1918) and the action of Khan Baghdadi (26 and 27 March 1918). At the end of the war, the division was rapidly run down and it (along with the brigade) was disbanded in March 1919.

The Indian Army did not form a 50th Indian Infantry Brigade in the Second World War, however it did form 50th Indian Parachute Brigade and 50th Indian Tank Brigade.

== Order of battle ==
The brigade had the following composition in the First World War:

- 1st Battalion, Oxfordshire and Buckinghamshire Light Infantry (joined from Corps Troops in August 1917)
- 6th Jat Light Infantry (joined from Corps Troops in August 1917)
- 14th King George's Own Ferozepore Sikhs (joined from Corps Troops in August 1917; transferred to 51st Indian Brigade, 17th Indian Division in October 1917)
- 1st Battalion, 97th Deccan Infantry (joined from Corps Troops in August 1917)
- 24th Punjabis (joined from Corps Troops in September 1917; left in September 1918 to join the 66th Brigade, British 22nd Division)
- 256th Machine Gun Company
- 50th Light Trench Mortar Battery ('O' Light Trench Mortar Battery joined 15th Division in September 1917 and assigned to the brigade in February 1918)

== Commander ==
The brigade was commanded from formation by Brigadier-General A.W. Andrew.

== Bibliography ==
- Kempton, Chris (2003b). 'Loyalty & Honour', The Indian Army September 1939 – August 1947. Vol. Part II Brigades. Milton Keynes: The Military Press. ISBN 0-85420-238-2.
- Perry, F.W. (1993). Order of Battle of Divisions Part 5B. Indian Army Divisions. Newport: Ray Westlake Military Books. ISBN 1-871167-23-X.
