= 17th Indian Division =

British Indian Army unit during World War I

- Active: August 1917 – August 1923
- Country: British India
- Allegiance: British Crown
- Branch: British Indian Army
- Type: Infantry
- Size: Division
- Part of: I Corps
- Engagements: World War I Mesopotamian Campaign Battle of Sharqat

Commanders
- Notable commanders: Major-General Webb Gillman; Major-General G.A.J. Leslie

The 17th Indian Division was formed in 1917 from units of the British Indian Army for service in the Mesopotamia Campaign during World War I. After the war, it formed part of the occupation force for Iraq and took part in the Iraq Rebellion in 1920. In August 1923, the division was reduced to a single brigade.

== History ==
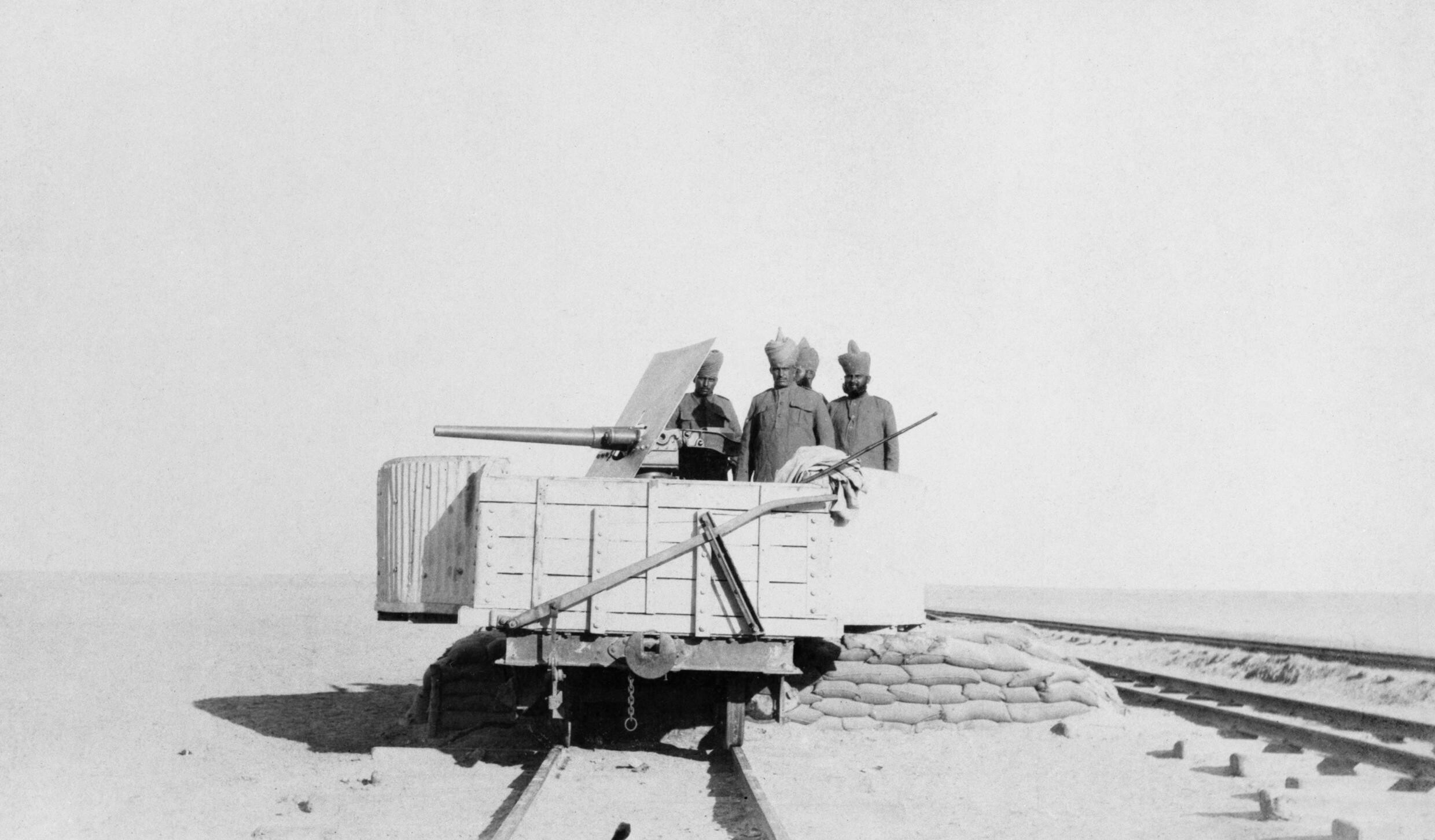
Indian troops Mesopotamia

The 17th Indian Division started forming in Mesopotamia from August 1917 with the 50th, 51st, and 52nd Indian Brigades. Shortly after being formed, the 50th Brigade exchanged places with the 34th Indian Brigade of 15th Indian Division.

Most of the infantry battalions that had already been guarding lines of communications in Mesopotamia for some months, were somewhat acclimatized and accustomed to the country. The division was involved in the action at Fat-ha Gorge on the Little Zab between 23–26 October 1918 and the Battle of Sharqat, 28–30 October 1918 under command of I Corps

At the end of the war, the 17th Division was chosen to form part of the occupation force for Iraq. It took part in the Iraq Rebellion in 1920. In August 1923, the division was reduced to a single brigade; the last British troops left in March 1927 and the Indian ones in November 1928.

== Order of battle ==
The division commanded the following units, although not all of them served at the same time:

=== 34th Indian Brigade ===
- 2nd Battalion, Queen's Own (Royal West Kent Regiment)
- 31st Punjabis
- 1st Battalion, 112th Infantry
- 114th Mahrattas
- 129th Machine Gun Company
- 34th Light Trench Mortar Battery

=== 51st Indian Brigade ===
- 1st Battalion, Highland Light Infantry
- 1st Battalion, 2nd Queen Victoria's Own Rajput Light Infantry
- 14th Ferozepore Sikhs
- 1st Battalion, 10th Gurkha Rifles
- 257th Machine Gun Company
- 51st Light Trench Mortar Battery

=== 52nd Indian Brigade ===
- 1/6th Battalion, Hampshire Regiment
- 45th Rattray's Sikhs
- 84th Punjabis
- 1st Battalion, 94th Russell's Infantry
- 1st Battalion, 113th Infantry
- 258th Machine Gun Company
- 52nd Light Trench Mortar Battery

=== Divisional Artillery ===
- CCXX Brigade, Royal Field Artillery (1064th, 1065th, 403rd (H) and Anglo-Indian Batteries) (Note: CCXX Brigade, Royal Field Artillery was originally the 1/I Home Counties Brigade of the Home Counties Division, Territorial Force, plus the 403rd (H) Battery. The Anglo-Indian Battery joined in May 1918.)
- CCXXI Brigade, Royal Field Artillery (1067th, 1068th, 404th (H) and Volunteer Batteries) (Note: CCXXI Brigade, Royal Field Artillery was originally the 1/II Home Counties Brigade of the Home Counties Division, TF, plus the 404th (H) Battery. The Volunteer Battery joined in April 1918 from 15th Indian Division.)
- X.17 Medium Trench Mortar Battery
- 17th Divisional Ammunition Column

=== Engineers and Pioneers ===
- Sirmoor, Tehri Garhwal and Malerkotla Sappers and Miners, ISF
- 17th Division Signal Company, Royal Engineers Signal Service
- 1st Battalion, 32nd Sikh Pioneers

=== Divisional Troops ===
- 276th Machine Gun Company
- 17th Machine Gun Battalion (Note: 17th Machine Gun Battalion was organised in November 1918 from the 129th, 257th, 258th and 276th Machine Gun Companies.)
- 3rd, 19th, 35th and 36th Combined Field Ambulances, RAMC
- No. 7 Mobile Veterinary Section, AVC
- 17th Division Train, ASC

== Commanders ==
The division was commanded from 25 August 1917 by Major-General W. Gillman. On 17 December 1917, Major-General G.A.J. Leslie took command.

== See also ==
- List of Indian divisions in World War I
