= George Mortimer Morris =

Brigadier-General George Mortimer Morris CB DSO
- Born: 22 August 1871
- Died: 24 April 1954 (aged 82); Litton Cheney, Dorset
- Military career
- Allegiance: United Kingdom
- Branch: British Indian Army
- Service years: 1890–1919
- Rank: Brigadier-General
- Unit: Devonshire Regiment
- Commands: 8th Gurkha Rifles; 55th Indian Brigade
- Conflicts: First World War
- Awards: CB, DSO

Brigadier-General George Mortimer Morris CB DSO (1871–1954) was a senior British Indian Army officer during the First World War.

== Biography ==
Born on 22 August 1871, George Mortimer Morris was educated at Bedford School. He received his first commission as a second lieutenant in the 3rd (Militia) Battalion, Devonshire Regiment, in March 1888.

He was promoted to the rank of Captain in the British Indian Army in 1901.

He served in the Mesopotamian campaign during the First World War, between 1914 and 1918, where he was commander of the 55th Indian Brigade when he was promoted to temporary brigadier general on 2 March 1918. Brigadier General George Mortimer Morris was appointed a Companion of the Distinguished Service Order in 1917, and as a Commander of the Order of the Bath in 1919.

He died in Litton Cheney, Dorset, on 24 April 1954, aged 82.
