= The Grenadiers =

Regiment of the Indian Army

- Regimental Insignia of The Grenadiers
- Active: 1778–present
- Country: British India; India
- Branch: East India Company; British Indian Army; Indian Army
- Type: Infantry
- Size: 25 battalions
- Regimental Centre: Jabalpur, Madhya Pradesh
- Nickname: The Grinders
- Motto: Sarvada Shaktishali (Ever Powerful)
- Engagements: Second Anglo-Afghan War; Third Burmese War; Third Anglo-Afghan War; First World War; Second World War; Sino-Indian War; Indo-Pakistani War of 1965; Nathu La and Cho La clashes Indo-Pakistani War of 1971; Operation Pawan; Kargil War, 1999 Sino-Indian border dispute: 2020–2021 China–India skirmishes
- Decorations: PVC – 3; AC – 2; MVC – 11; KC – 6; PVSM – 32; UYSM – 13; AVSM – 30; VrC – 53; SC – 78; YSM – 26; VSM – 43; SM – 284; VC – 4; MC - 35; IoM – 71; Mentioned in dispatches - 398; COAS commendation card- 917
- Battle honours: Post Independence Gurez, Asal Uttar, Jarpal, Chakra, Tololing & Tiger Hill

Commanders
- Colonel of the Regiment: Lt Gen Sanjay Mitra

Insignia
- Regimental Insignia: A brass grenade bearing the White Horse of Hanover. The insignia is worn on the uniform with a white hackle.

The Grenadiers is an infantry regiment of the Indian Army, formerly part of the Bombay Army and later the pre-independence British Indian Army, when the regiment was known as the 4th Bombay Grenadiers. It has distinguished itself during the two world wars and also since the Independence of India. The regiment has won many battle honours and gallantry awards, and is considered to be one of India's most decorated regiments with three Param Vir Chakra awardees in three different conflicts.

== History ==
=== Early history ===
The Grenadiers are one of the oldest grenadier regiments in the Commonwealth of Nations, and have the longest unbroken record of existence in the Indian Army. The history of the Grenadiers dates back to the Bombay Army of the East India Company (EIC). In 1684, the Bombay Army consisted of three companies stationed on the Seven Islands of Bombay, one of which was a grenadier company. The company, which consisted of a mixture of Europeans and native Christians, disappears from subsequent historical records. By 1710, the Bombay Army had expanded to five companies of "Europeans, topasses, and coffrees", one of which was an all-European grenadier company. This company was subsequently merged into the Bombay European Regiment, which was later disbanded. In 1757, Robert Clive raised the 1st Regiment of Bengal Native Infantry, which consisted in part of two grenadier companies. However, no grenadier regiments were raised by the Bengal Army until 1779.

In 1759, as a response to the ongoing Seven Years' War, the Bombay Army underwent a major expansion, and the first company of native grenadiers was raised with the best of Bombay sepoys "paying a regard to those having families on the island". It had only native officers and all sepoys wore red coats with blue facings. Later on, an adjutant was appointed to the corps. Later the Bombay Army comprised a number of sepoy battalions, each having one or two grenadier companies. These were clubbed together as a composite battalion comprising the grenadier companies of the Bombay sepoy battalions, and they won the famous battle of Talegaon in 1778. So impressive was the performance of this composite battalion that the Bombay Presidency ordered the permanent raising of a grenadier battalion which duly took place on 12 March 1779, thirty-six years before the first time that a British battalion was given the honour of calling itself "grenadiers". The Governor General of Bombay made an Order dated 12 November 1779, according to which the grenadier companies of the following regiments combined to form the first Grenadier Regiment in the world, namely "The Grenadier Battalion, First Regiment of Infantry":

- 1st Sepoy Battalion
- 2nd Sepoy Battalion
- 3rd Sepoy Battalion
- 4th Sepoy Battalion
- 5th Sepoy Battalion
- 6th Sepoy Battalion
- Marine Battalion (two companies of grenadiers)

=== 4th Bombay Grenadiers ===
4th Bombay Grenadiers
- Active: 1922–1947
- Country: British India
- Branch: British Indian Army
- Type: Infantry

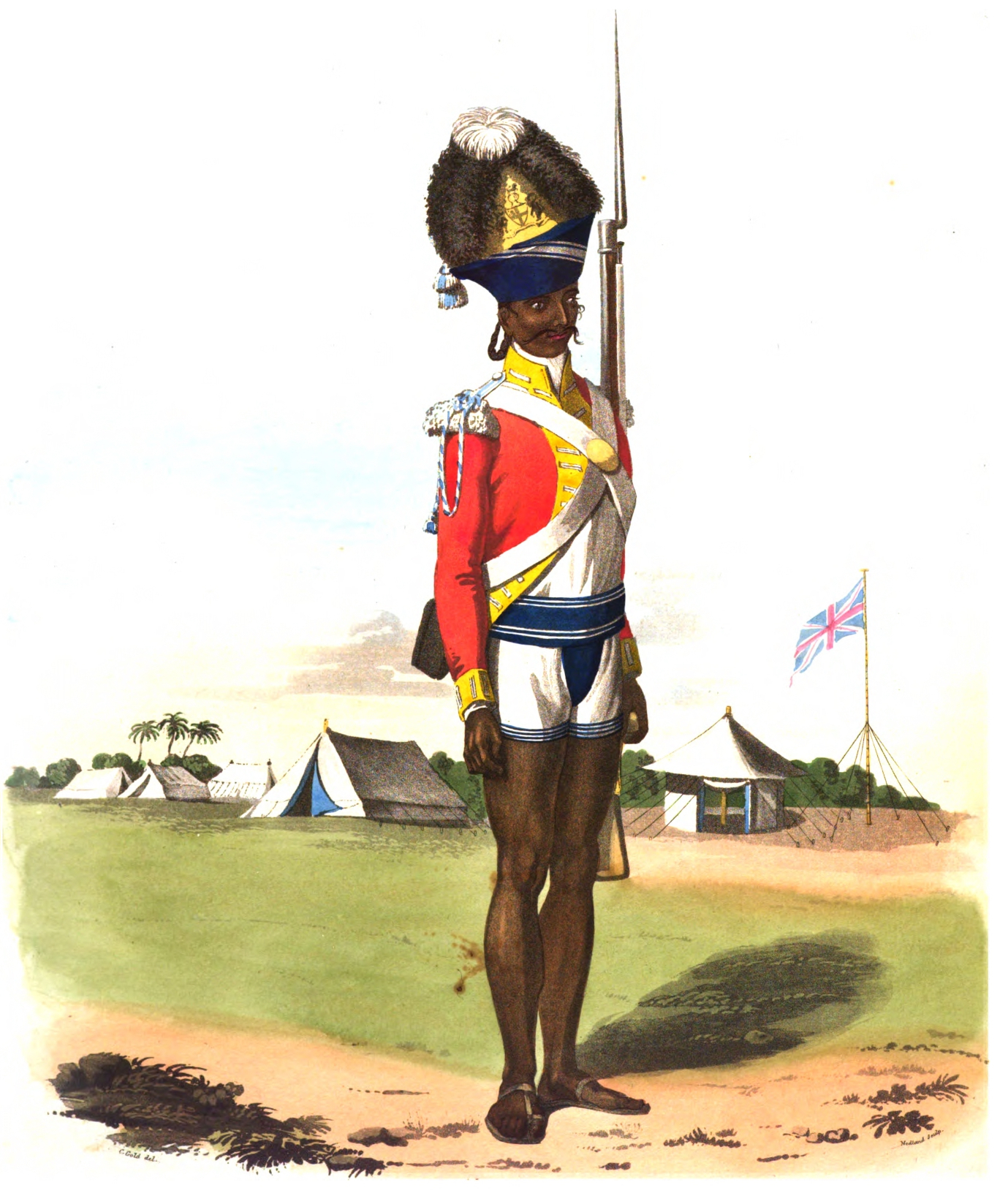
1806 illustration of a Bombay Army grenadier

The 4th Bombay Grenadiers were an infantry regiment of the pre-independence Indian Army, formed on 1 March 1922 as part of the reforms of the Indian Army that took place after the end of the First World War. Following this, the Regiment spent the next fifteen years serving in the British Somaliland protectorate in present-day Somaliland, as well as in China and on the North-West Frontier. The 3rd, 4th and 5th Battalions were all disbanded and the 10th Battalion amalgamated with the 10th Battalion, Jat Regiment to form a Combined Training Centre at Bareilly. Following the Second World War, they were one of the regiments allocated to the new Indian Army and renamed The Grenadiers.

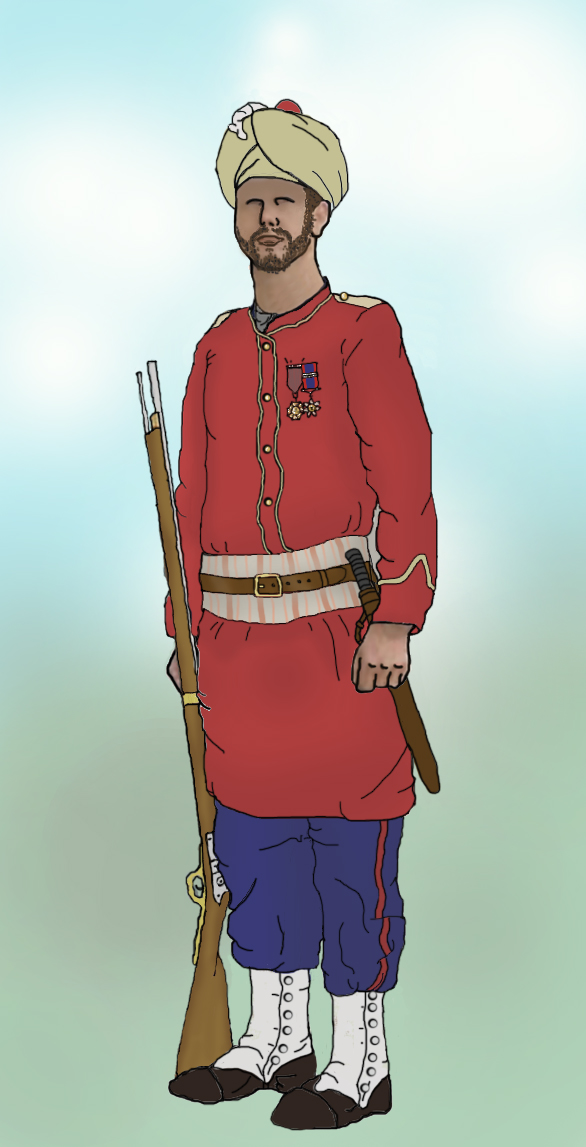
Bombay Grenadier in British service, 1879.

The regiment consisted of six battalions, all former regiments themselves. These were:

- 1st Battalion - Formerly the 101st Grenadiers.
- 2nd Battalion - Formerly the 102nd King Edward's Own Grenadiers
- 3rd Battalion - Formerly the 108th Infantry
- 4th Battalion - Formerly the 109th Infantry
- 5th Battalion - Formerly the 112th Infantry
- 10th (Training) Battalion - Formerly the 113th Infantry

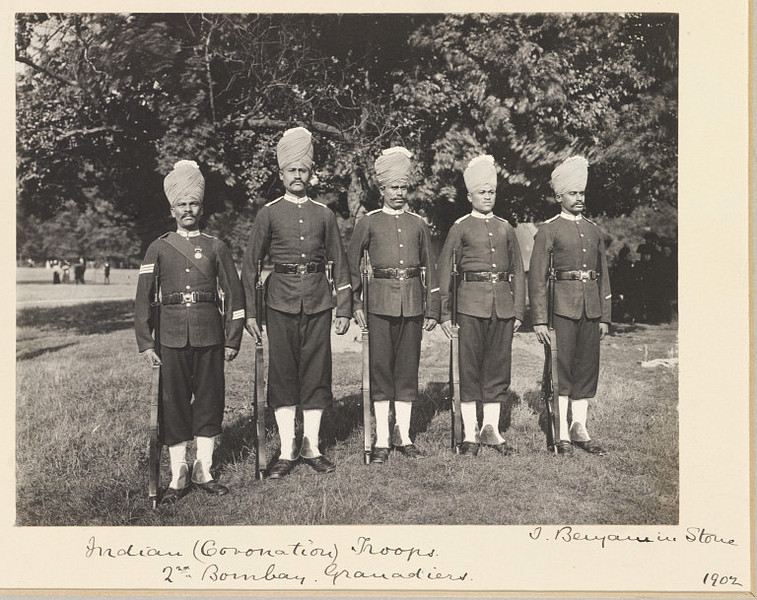
2nd Bombay Grenadiers of the Indian Army in Hampton Court Camp on the occasion of the Coronation of King Edward VII, August 1902

==== Second World War ====
At the beginning of the Second World War there were only two battalions of the Regiment, the 1st and 2nd. This was soon changed, though, as a number of battalions were raised for wartime service, including: 3rd, 4th, 5th, 6th, 14th, 25th, 26th and 27th Battalions. The 10th (Training Battalion) was also de-linked from The Jat Regiment. Some of these battalions were to be garrison or rear area troops only, while others went on to serve with distinction in a number of theatres during the war including the Middle East and Burma, notably during the Arakan campaigns and at Kohima.

The 4th Grenadiers formed the motorised infantry element of the Indian Armoured and Tank brigades, distinguishing themselves as 'tank escort' infantry protecting tanks against sniper attack in jungle conditions:

- 1/4th Battalion, 252nd Indian Armoured Brigade, 31st Indian Armoured Division
- 2/4th Battalion, 50th Indian Tank Brigade
- 3/4th Battalion, 254th Indian Tank Brigade
- 4/4th Battalion, 255th Indian Tank Brigade

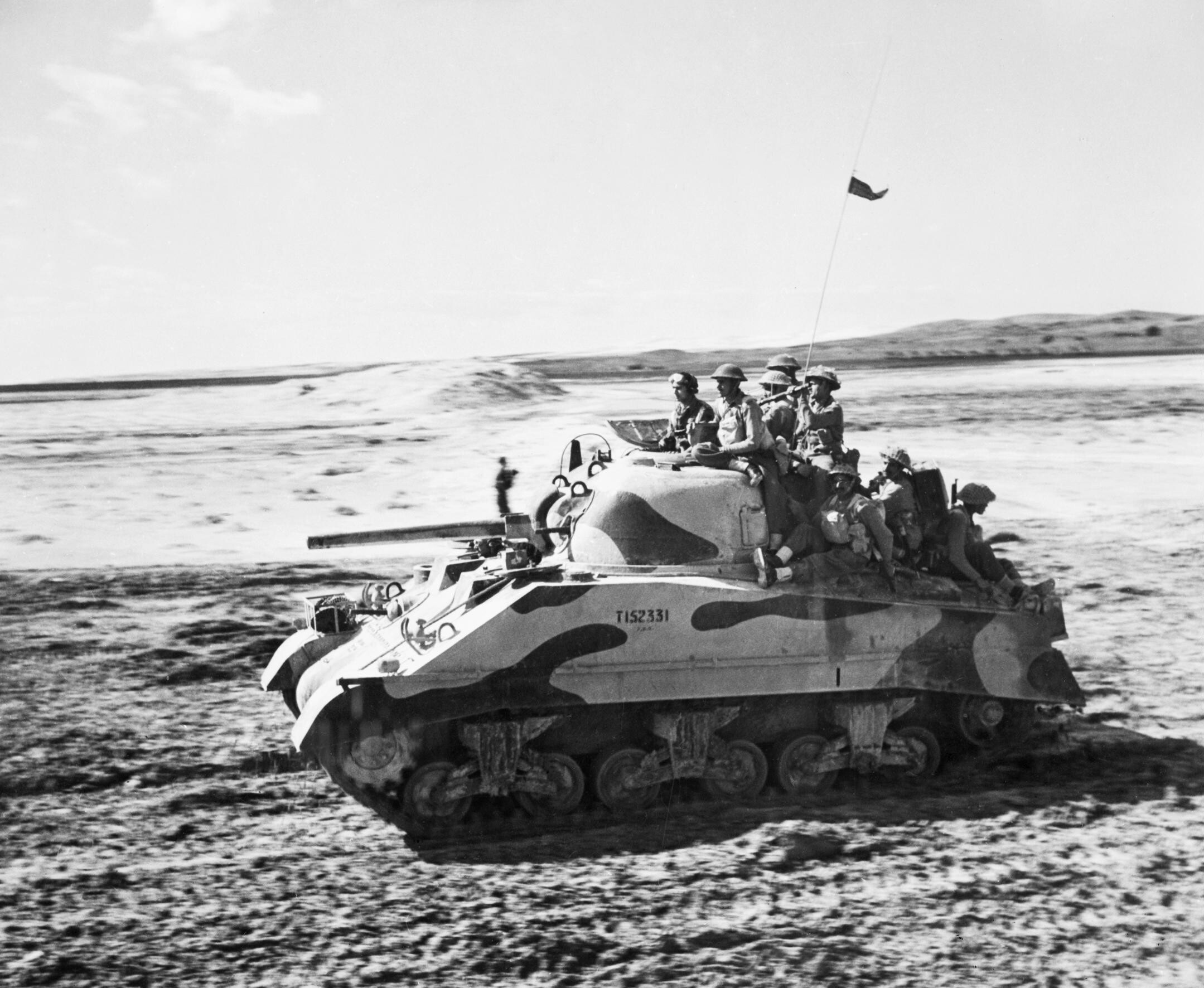
Grenadiers in a Sherman III tank in the Middle East, March 1944.

==== Partition ====
In October 1945, the Indian infantry regiments lost their numerical designation and the regiment was re-designated as the Indian Grenadiers, thus severing its last link with the erstwhile Bombay Army (Special Indian Army Order 132/S/45). Following the partition of India, the regiment was allotted to India. The active units at that time were the 1st, 2nd, 3rd, 4th and 25th. The Muslim troops in the regiment were allotted to Pakistan. Dogras from 5 Baluch joined the 1st battalion, The Frontier Force Rifles to 2nd battalion, and from 1/16 Punjab to the 4th battalion.

== Regimental battalions ==
The Grenadiers consists of 23 battalions, four Rashtriya Rifles battalions and two Territorial Army battalions -

Battalion	Raising Date	Remarks	References
1st Battalion §	1778	Raised as 8th Regiment of Bombay Sepoys. Underwent many name changes, was designated 101st Grenadiers, prior to present designation. Battle honours - Mangalore, Mysore, Hyderabad, Kandahar 1880, Afghanistan 1878–80, Burma 1885–87, Somaliland 1901–04, East Africa 1914–16, Egypt, Gaza, Megiddo, Nablus, Palestine 1917–18. Post independence – Gurais. Became 2nd Battalion, Brigade of the Guards in 1950.	
2nd Battalion	1796	Raised in Calicut by Captain David Cameron as 13th Battalion, Bombay Native Infantry. Underwent many name changes, was designated 102nd King Edward's Own Grenadiers, before present designation. Battle honours – Egypt (1801), Kirkee (1817), Koregaon (1817), Persia (1857), Abyssinia (1868), Kut-Al-Amara (1917), Naga Village (1944). Nicknamed Second to None.	
3rd Battalion	1768	Raised as 1st Battalion, Bombay Sepoys. Underwent many name changes, was designated 108th Infantry, before present designation. Nicknamed Param Vir Chakra Paltan. Battle honours (pre-independence) – Mangalore 1783, Mysore 1793, Hyderabad (Sind) 1843, Afghanistan 1879, Aden 1916, Mesopotamia 1917, Kalewa 1944 and Fort Dufferin, Mandalay 1945; post-independence – theatre honour - Rajasthan (Sadhewala) in 1965 and battle honour – Jarpal in 1971. Major Hoshiar Singh was awarded the PVC.	
4th Battalion	1768	Raised as 5th Battalion, Bombay Sepoys. Underwent many name changes, was designated 109th Infantry, before present designation. Battle honours : pre-independence – Mysore, Central India, Aden, Punjab, Multan, Burma, Afghanistan, Taungtha, Meiktila, Pwabwe, Sharqat, Pegu; post-independence – Asal Uttar (1965). CQMH Abdul Hamid was awarded the PVC. Nicknamed Param Vir Chakra Paltan and The Fighting Fourth.	
5th Battalion	1796	Raised as 2nd Battalion, 6th Regiment of Bombay Native Infantry. Underwent many name changes, was designated 112th Infantry, before present designation. Nicknamed Finest Fifth.	
6th Battalion	1962	Raised as 6/4 Grenadiers (Motorised) by Lieutenant Colonel D Greigson at Nasirabad in 1942. Disbanded 1943. Re-raised in 1962 by Lieutenant Colonel AB Jhadav at Jaipur. Nicknamed Joshila Sixth.	
7th battalion §	1949	Raised from Kutch and Saurashtra State Forces in camel mounted role, became regular infantry in 1957. Became 9th Battalion, Mechanised Infantry Regiment in 1979. Battle honour Chhadbet	
8th Battalion	1963	Raised 1949 in Ahmedabad from state forces of Lunavada, Rajpipla, Baria and Idar, disbanded 1949, re-raised 1963 in Jaipur under Major BS Brah. Battle honour – Chakra (1971). Nicknamed Chakra Battalion and Gallant Eighth.	
9th Battalion	1954	Mewar, ex-State Forces unit	
10th Battalion	1800	Raised 1st Battalion, 7th Regiment of Bombay Native Infantry. Underwent many name changes, was designated 113th Infantry, before present designation. Training Battalion.	
11th Battalion	1963	Raised at Ajmer as a Territorial battalion in 1922 (1st battalion, Ajmer Regiment), disbanded in 1948, re-raised in 1963 in Jaipur by Lieutenant Colonel Racchpal Singh.	
12th Battalion	1964	Raised at Nasirabad by Major NS Sidhu. Lieutenant Colonel Hari Singh was the first commanding officer. Nicknamed Thundering Twelfths.	
13th Battalion	1889	Raised as the Ganga Risala by Maharaja Ganga Singh of the Indian state of Bikaner.	
14th Battalion	1965	From 34th Training Unit (raised 1943), disbanded 1946, re-raised 1965.	
15th Battalion	1966	Raised in Nasirabad by Lieutenant Colonel PS Mahurkar. Nicknamed The Dare Devils	
16th Battalion	1966	Raised in Babina under Lieutenant Colonel NB Jayaram .	
17th Battalion §	1966	Raised as a camel battalion in Bikaner under Lieutenant Colonel KS Harihar Singh. Nicknamed The Desert Hawks. Motorized Infantry Regiment. Became 24th Battalion, Brigade of the Guards in 2023.	
18th Battalion	1976	Battle honour – Tiger Hill and Tololing. Nicknamed Param Vir Chakra Paltan after the PVC won by Grenadier Yogendra Singh Yadav.	
19th Battalion	1979	Nicknamed Utkrisht Unnees.	
20th Battalion		Nicknamed Double Axe.	
21st Battalion	1985	Nicknamed Awwal Ekkis.	
22nd Battalion	1988	Raised in Jabalpur. Nicknamed as Bravest of the Brave and Ashok Chakra Paltan – has won two Ashok Chakras.	
23rd Battalion			
24th Battalion			
25th Battalion	1 July 2014	Raised at the Grenadiers Regimental Centre in Jabalpur, the battalion was established under the command of Colonel Vipul Singh Rajput. Nicknamed Parakrami Pacchees.	
12 Rashtriya Rifles			
29 Rashtriya Rifles		Nicknamed Cobra Paltan.	
39 Rashtriya Rifles			
55 Rashtriya Rifles			
118 (TA) Battalion	1939	Raised at 7 Central Provincial Urban Infantry Battalion (Indian Territorial Force). Present designation since 1949. Located at Bhusaval, Maharashtra	
123 (TA) Battalion	1956	Raised by Lieutenant Colonel Zorawar Singh at raised at Senapati House, Jhotwara. Located at Jaipur, Rajasthan. Nicknamed Jaipur Terriers.	

§ indicates former units.

== Affiliations ==
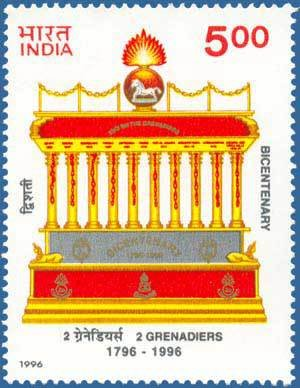
Postal stamp - Bicentenary of 2nd Grenadiers, 1996

Attestation Parade at Grenadiers Regimental Centre, Jabalpur, September 2021.
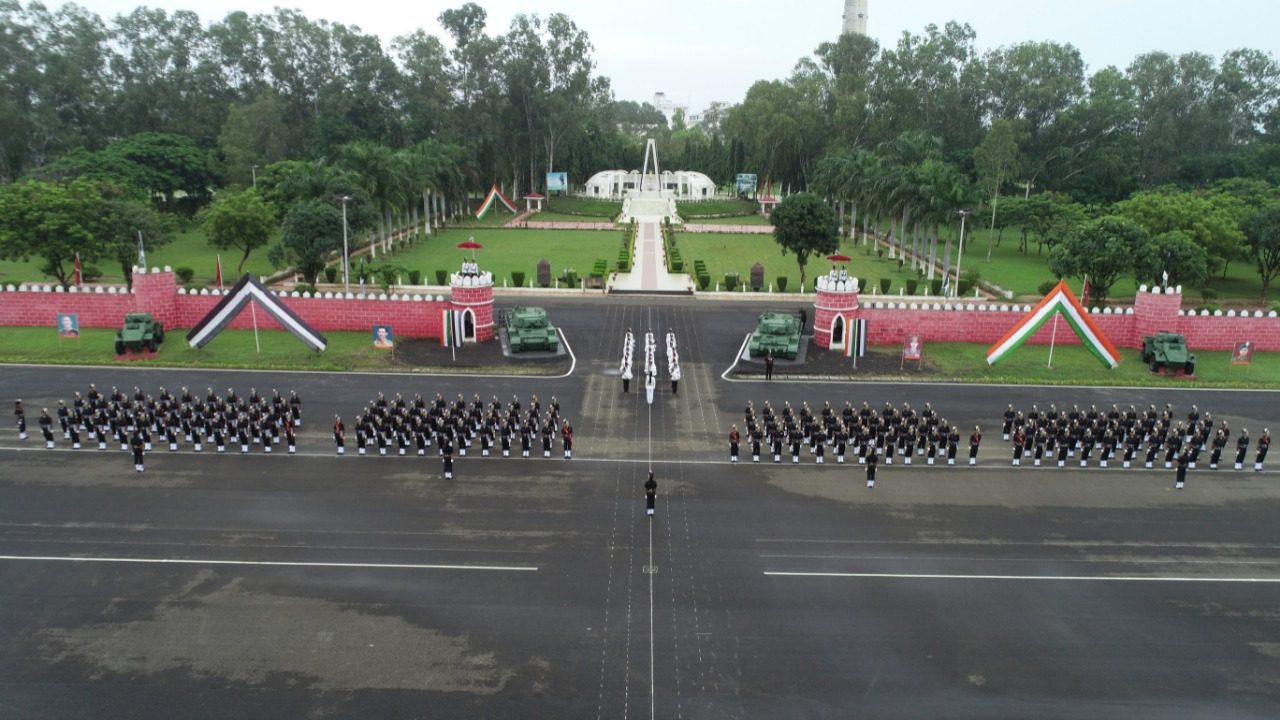
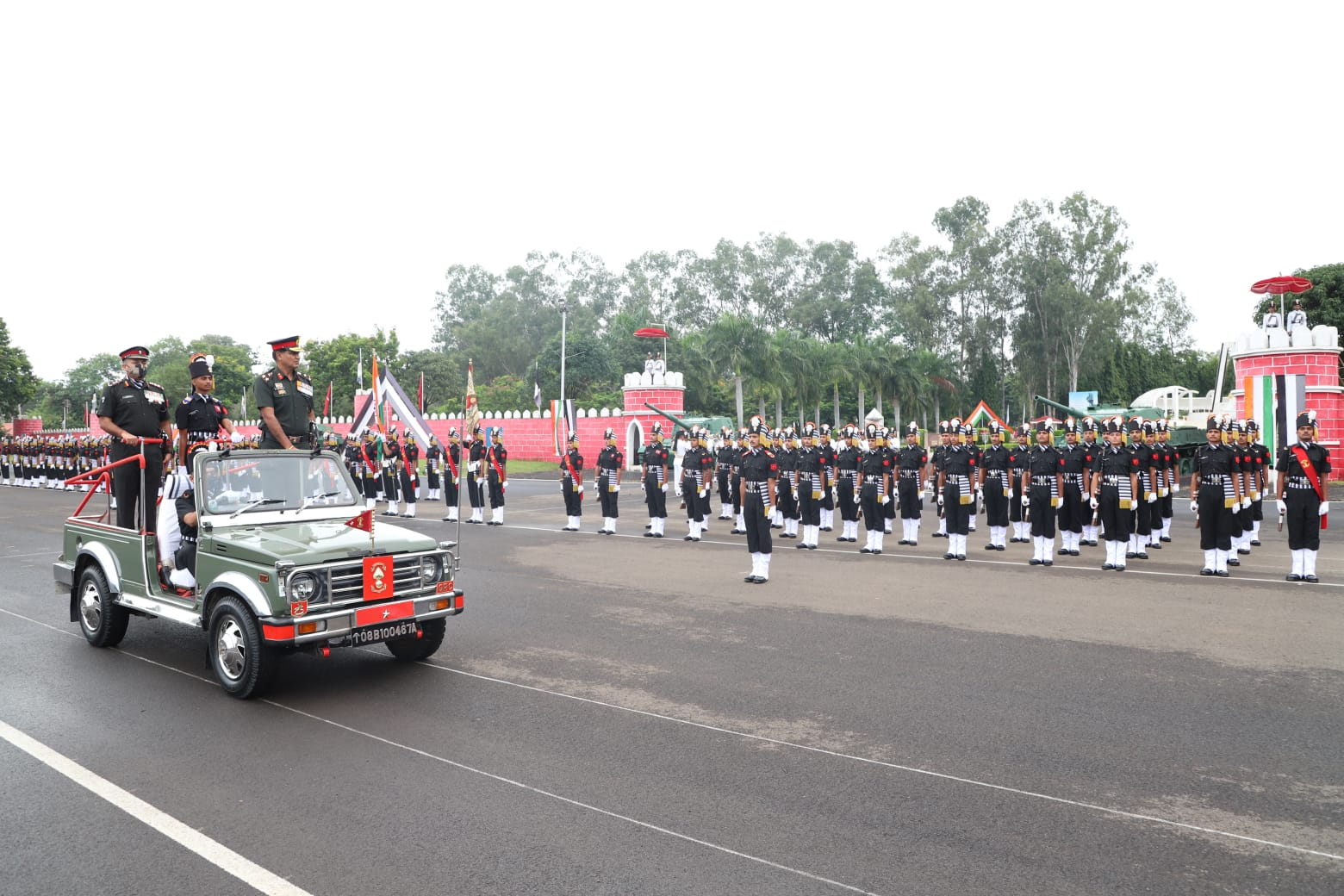

The Grenadiers has been affiliated with the following -

- 51 Armoured Regiment.
- INS Beas (F37).

== Class composition ==
- 1923 - Rajputana Mussalmans, Rajputana Jats, Mahrattas, Mers, and Merats.
- 1946 - Jats from the Punjab, United Provinces, Rajputana and Central India states, Hindustani Mussalmans from Ambala Civil Division, Rajputana, United Provinces, Central India states, and the Deccan.
- Present - Rajputs, Kaimkhanis, Hindustani Mussalmans, Dogras, Gujjar, Ahir, Mena, Gujratis, and Jats.

== Battle honours ==
=== Battle Honours (Pre-Independence) ===
Prior to Indian independence, the Regiment had won many battle honours as part of the British Indian Army. These battle honour include:

==== Pre-World War I ====
- Mangalore – 1784
- Mysore – 1786
- Srirangapatnam – 1799
- Egypt – 1802
- Koregaon – 1818
- Beni Boo Alli – 1821
- Kirkee – 1827
- Hyderabad – 1831–43
- Multan
- Meeane – 1843
- Punjab – 1848
- Central India – 1858
- Abyssinia – 1868
- Kandahar 1880
- Afghanistan 1878–80
- Burma 1885–87
- Somaliland (Dharatol) – 1901–04
- Afghanistan 1919

==== World War I ====
- East Africa 1914–16
- Egypt – 1916–17
- Baghdad – 1917
- Kut-Al-Amara – 1917
- Gaza – 1917
- Battle of Sharqat – 1918
- Megiddo
- Nablus – 1918
- Palestine 1917–18
- Mesopotamia – 1915–18
- Aden – 1914–19
- Afghanistan 1919
- Tigris – 1919

==== World War II ====
- Kohima – 1944
- Kalewa – 1944
- Naga Village – 1944
- Fort Dufferin, Mandalay – 1945
- Pwabwe – 1945
- Capture of Meiktila – 1945
- Defense of Meiktila – 1945
- Pegu – 1945
- Taungtha – 1945

=== Battle Honours (Post-Independence) ===
Since 1947, the Regiment has won the following battle honours as part of the Indian Army:

- Gurais – 1948
- Asal Uttar – 1965
- Jarpal – 1971
- Chakra – 1971
- Tololing & Tiger Hill (Kargil War) – 1999

== Decorations ==
The Grenadiers have the unique and distinct honour of having the most number of Param Vir Chakras, India's highest medal for gallantry, among all the Indian Army's Infantry Regiments. Of note also, is the fact that prior to independence, British officers serving with The Grenadiers won four Victoria Crosses. Members of the Regiment have also received a number of other decorations prior to independence.

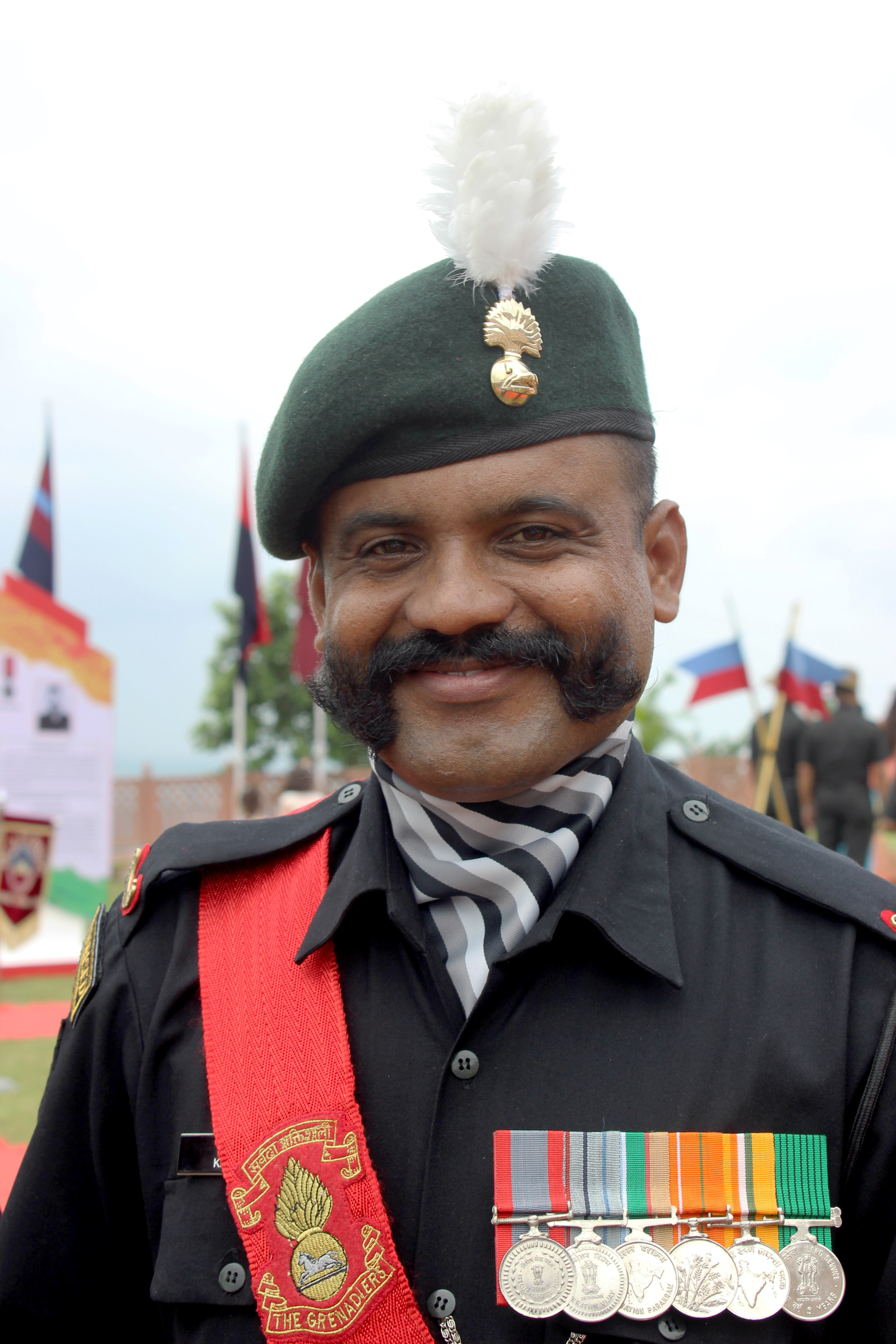
An NCO of The Grenadiers, 2017

=== Pre independence ===
Victoria Cross

- Captain George Murray Rolland, 22 April 1903, Daratoleh, Somaliland

1914-1921

Military Cross

- Jemadar Pola Khan, 101st Grenadiers, Egypt
- Subedar Jiwan Khan, 101st Grenadiers, Egypt and Aden (twice)
- Subedar Kasianth Mane, 101st Grenadiers, Egypt

Order of British India

- Subedar Major Martand Rao Mohite, 101st Grenadiers, Egypt
- Subedar Agdi Singh, 102nd Grenadiers, Mesopotamia

Indian Order of Merit

- Sepoy Fazil Khan, 101st Grenadiers, East Africa
- Sepoy Sowaz Khan, 101st Grenadiers, East Africa
- Subedar Rahim Khan, 101st Grenadiers, Egypt
- Subedar Ahmed Din, 101st Grenadiers, Egypt
- Colour Havildar Shah Muhammad, 101st Grenadiers, Egypt
- Subedar Jafar Ali, 102nd Grenadiers, Muscat
- Sepoy Nand Ram, 102nd Grenadiers, Muscat
- Subedar Ganga Ram Singh, 102nd Grenadiers, Mesopotamia
- Subedar Muhammad Ali, 102nd Grenadiers, Mesopotamia
- Jemadar Ganga Ram, 102nd Grenadiers, Mesopotamia
- Havildar Jaffar Ali, 102nd Grenadiers, Waziristan
- Naik Shivlal Dalal (1933)

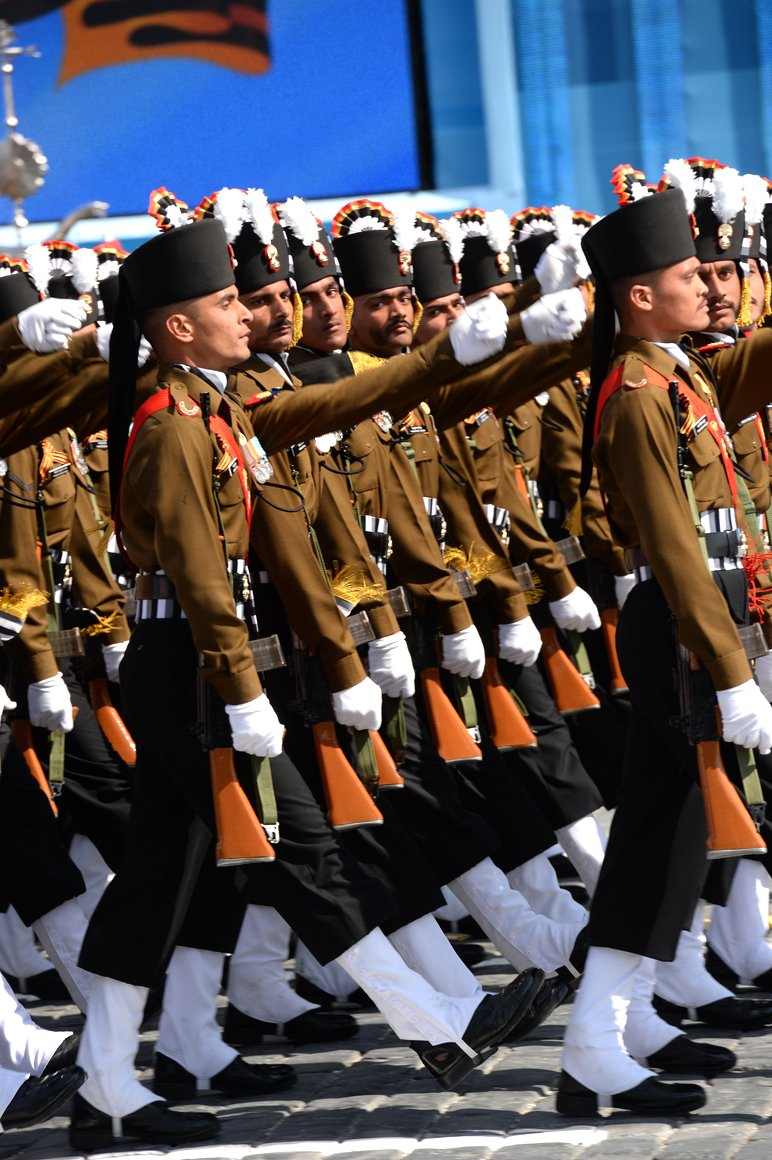
Grenadiers participating in the 2015 Moscow Victory Day Parade, marking the 70th anniversary of the victory in Europe.

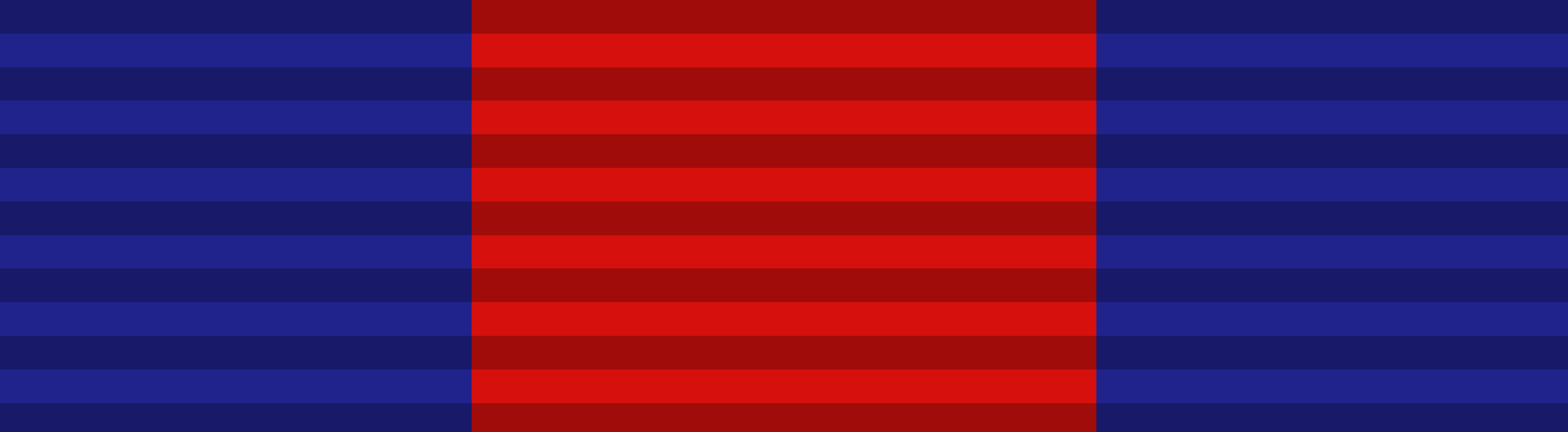
Indian Distinguished Service Medal

- Lance Naik Abdul Sattar Khan, Temporary Lance Naik Muhammad Khan, 101st Grenadiers, Egypt
- Havildar Karan Singh, Havildar Ganga Ram, Private Sultan Ahmad, Havildar Tula Ram, Havildar Tula Ram, Havildar Mansare Ali, Private Sheo Ram, Havildar Sanwal Ram, Private Shedu Ram, Private Sirdara Ram, Private Surja Ram, Jemadar Khan Muhammad, Sepoy Ahmad Khan, Sepoy Girdhari Ram, Sepoy Tulsi Ram, Private Feroz Khan, Havildar Ram Diyal Singh, Naik Niyamat Khan (all in Mesopotamia), Private Karam Dad Khan (Muscat), Lance Naik Hoti Singh (Baluchistan), Subedar Mansar Ali (Pishin Moveable Column) 102nd Grenadiers

Indian Meritorious Service Medal

- 84 medals - 101st Grenadiers, Egypt, Aden, Somaliland, India
- 12 medals - 102nd Grenadiers, Mesopotamia, India, Baluchistan

World War II

Member of the Most Excellent Order of the British Empire (MBE)

- Subedar Major Shamshad Khan, 4th Bombay Grenadiers

Mentioned in dispatches

- Major T H Waumsley, 4th Bombay Grenadiers
- Major E R S Dods, 4th Bombay Grenadiers

=== Post independence ===
Param Vir Chakra

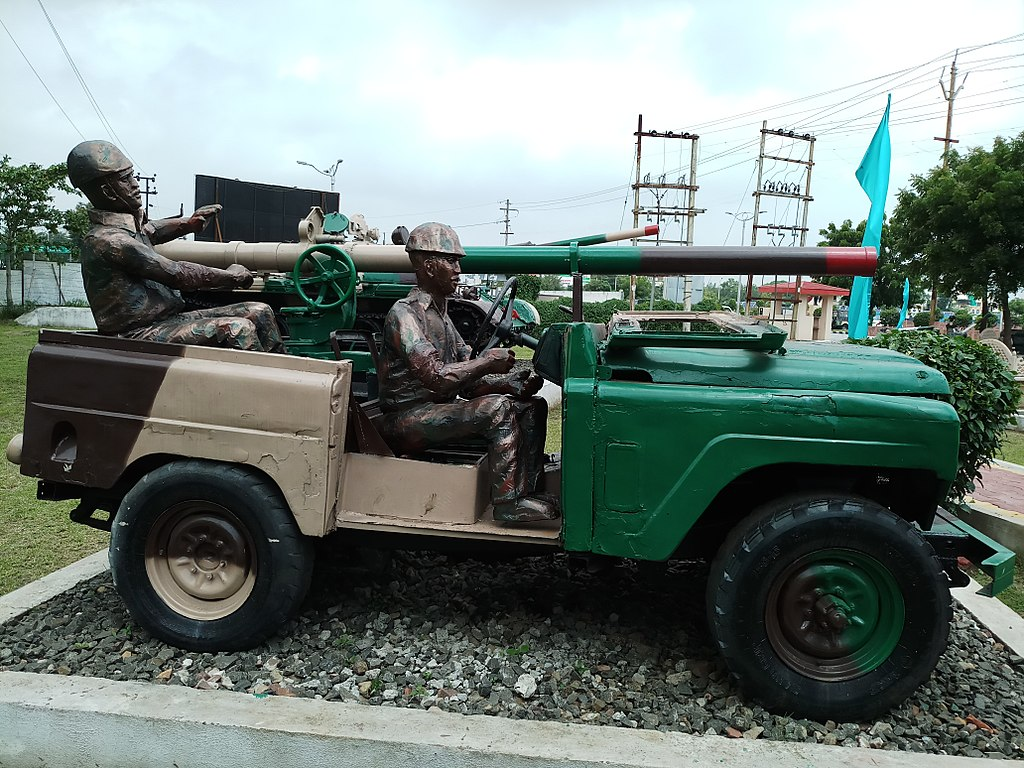
Depiction of a 105 mm Jonga-mounted RCL gun, manned by Abdul Hamid, which destroyed eight tanks during the Battle of Asal Uttar

- Company Quarter Master Havildar Abdul Hamid, 4th Grenadiers, 1965.
- Major Hoshiar Singh, 3rd Grenadiers, 1971.
- Grenadier Yogendra Singh Yadav, 18th Grenadiers, 1999.

Ashok Chakra

- Second Lieutenant Rakesh Singh, 22nd Grenadiers, 1993
- Major Rajiv Kumar Joon, 22nd Grenadiers, 1995

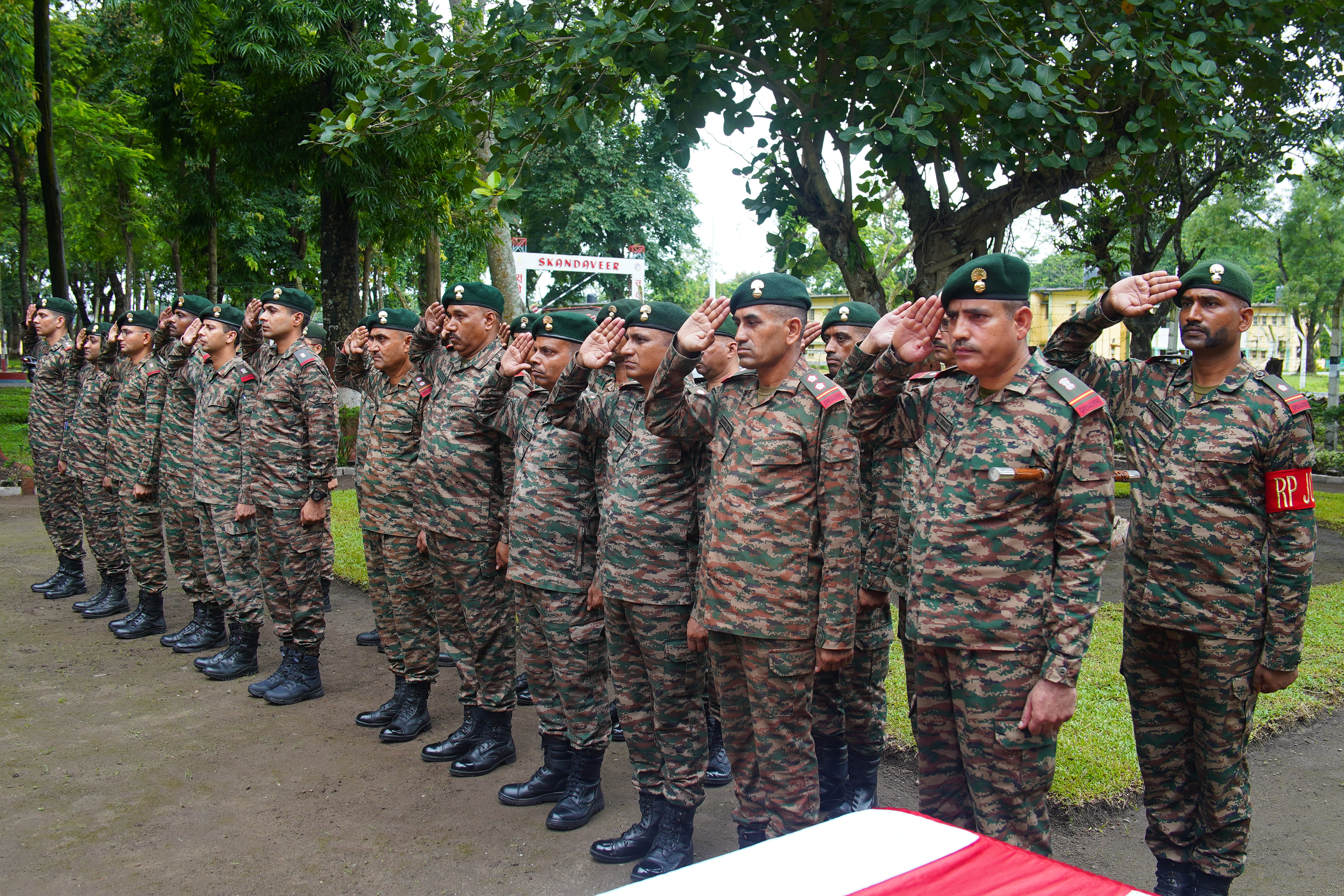
Soldiers of 25 Grenadiers

Maha Vir Chakra

- 2nd Lieutenant Gopala Krishna Venkatesa Prasanna Rao, (Posthumous), 4th Grenadiers, Sino-Indian War, 1962
- Brigadier Rai Singh Yadav, 2nd Grenadiers, Nathu La and Cho La clashes 1967.
- Lieutenant General Ved Prakash Airy, 3rd Grenadiers, Indo-Pak War of 1971 (Battle of Basantar).
- Major Dharam Vir Singh, 8th Grenadiers, Indo-Pak War of 1971.
- Major General Antony Harold Edward Michigan, Indo-Pak War of 1971.
- Major Rajesh Singh Adhikari, (Posthumous), 18th Grenadiers, Kargil War (Operation Vijay) 1999.
- Colonel Balwan Singh, 18th Grenadiers, Kargil War (Operation Vijay) 1999.

Kirti Chakra

- Grenadier Daryao Singh, 1948
- Grenadier Gopal Singh (Posthumous), 1981
- Grenadier Bajrang Singh (Posthumous), 1981
- Naik Prakash Chand, 1990
- Lieutenant Ravinder Chikara (Posthumous), 2001
- Grenadier Anil Kumar (Posthumous), 2003
- Colonel Gurbir Singh Sarna (Posthumous), 2006
- Major Rajinder Kumar Sharma, 2008
- Grenadier Pawan Kumar (Posthumous), 2024

Vir Chakra

- Lieutenant Colonel Ramakrishnan Vishwanathan, (Posthumous), 18th Grenadiers, Kargil War (Operation Vijay) 1999.

== Notable General Officers ==
- Vice Chief of the Army Staff - Lieutenant General Stanley Leslie Menezes, PVSM, SC
- Army Commanders (GOC-in-C) - Lieutenant General Y. N. Sharma (Central Command)
- Corps Commanders (GOC) - Y.S. Tomar, Sanjay Mitra (I Corps); Rajeev Sirohi (III Corps); Stanley Leslie Menezes, Shakti Gurung, Gurpal Singh Sangha (all IV Corps); Y.N. Sharma (XII Corps); Sarabjit Singh Dhillon (XV Corps); Lalit Kumar Pandey (XVII Corps).

== Bibliography ==
- Barthorp, Michael; Burn, Jeffrey (1979). Indian infantry regiments 1860–1914. Osprey Publishing. ISBN 0-85045-307-0.
- Rinaldi, Richard A (2008). Order of Battle British Army 1914. Ravi Rikhye. ISBN 978-0-9776072-8-0.
- Sharma, Gautam (1990). Valour and sacrifice: famous regiments of the Indian Army. Allied Publishers. ISBN 81-7023-140-X.
- Sumner, Ian (2001). The Indian Army 1914–1947. Osprey Publishing. ISBN 1-84176-196-6.
- Moberly, Frederick James (1927) [1923]. The Campaign in Mesopotamia 1914–1918. History of the Great War Based on Official Documents. Vol. I. London: HMSO. OCLC 772784341.
- Singh, Rajendra (1969) History of the Grenadiers
- Singh, Rajendra (1955) Organisation and Administration in the Indian Army
- Palsokar, R.D. (1980) The Grenadiers, a Tradition of Valour, The Grenadiers Regimental Centre, Jabalpur

== See also ==
- List of regiments of the Indian Army
- British Indian Army
- Indian Army
