= 18th Indian Division =

- Active: 24 December 1917 – 1921
- Country: British India
- Allegiance: British Crown
- Branch: British Indian Army
- Type: Infantry
- Size: Division
- Part of: I Corps
- Engagements: World War I Mesopotamian Campaign Battle of Sharqat

Commanders
- Notable commanders: Major-General H.D. Fanshawe

The 18th Indian Division was an infantry division of the British Indian Army that saw active service in the First World War. It took part in the Mesopotamian campaign and formed part of the occupation force for Iraq post-war. The division was not reformed for the Second World War.

== History ==
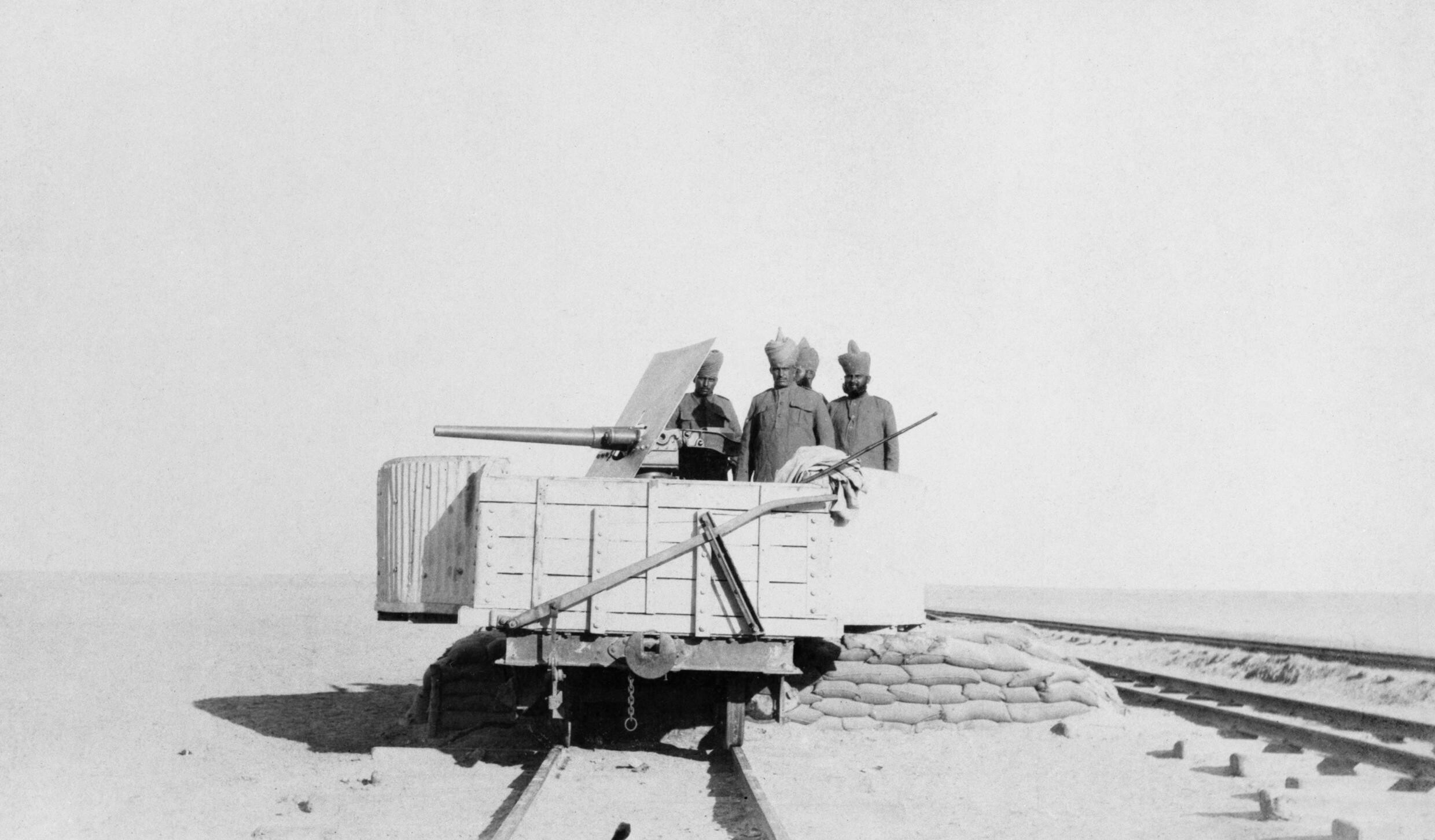
Indian troops Mesopotamia

The 18th Indian Division was formed in Mesopotamia on 24 December 1917, although the last of its brigades (55th) was not formed until January 1918. Many of the division's units transferred directly from India so time was needed for them to become acclimatized. It remained in Mesopotamia for the rest of the First World War, taking part in the action at Fat-ha Gorge on the Little Zab (23–26 October 1918) and the Battle of Sharqat (28–30 October 1918) under the command of I Corps.

At the end of the war, the 18th Division was chosen to form part of the occupation force for Iraq. It took part in the Iraq Rebellion in 1920 and was broken up in the following year.

== Order of battle ==
The division commanded the following units, although not all of them served at the same time:

=== 53rd Indian Brigade ===
- 1/9th Battalion, Duke of Cambridge's Own (Middlesex Regiment)
- 1st Battalion, 89th Punjabis
- 1st Battalion, 3rd Queen Alexandra's Own Gurkha Rifles
- 1st Battalion, 7th Gurkha Rifles
- 207th Machine Gun Company
- 53rd Light Trench Mortar Battery

=== 54th Indian Brigade ===
- 1/5th Battalion, Queen's Own (Royal West Kent Regiment)
- 25th Punjabis
- 1st Battalion, 39th Garhwal Rifles
- 52nd Sikhs (Frontier Force)
- 238th Machine Gun Company
- 54th Light Trench Mortar Battery

=== 55th Indian Brigade ===
- 1/5th Battalion, East Surrey Regiment
- 1st Battalion, 10th Jats
- 87th Punjabis
- 1st Battalion, 94th Russell's Infantry
- 116th Mahrattas
- 1st Battalion, 5th Gurkha Rifles (Frontier Force)
- 239th Machine Gun Company
- 55th Light Trench Mortar Battery

=== Divisional Artillery ===
- CCCXXXVI Brigade, Royal Field Artillery (A, B, C and D (H) Batteries) (Note: CCCXXXVI Brigade, Royal Field Artillery was originally the 2/II Home Counties Brigade of the 67th (2nd Home Counties) Division, Territorial Force.)
- CCCXXXVII Brigade, Royal Field Artillery (A, B, C and 341st (H) Batteries) (Note: CCCXXXVII Brigade, Royal Field Artillery was originally the 2/III Home Counties Brigade of the 67th (2nd Home Counties) Division, Territorial Force.)
- X.18 Medium Trench Mortar Battery
- 18th Divisional Ammunition Column

=== Engineers and Pioneers ===
- 2nd, 5th, 6th and 8th Field Companies, 1st King George's Own Sappers and Miners
- 18th Division Signal Company, Royal Engineers Signal Service
- 106th Hazara Pioneers
- 1st Battalion, 32nd Sikh Pioneers

=== Divisional Troops ===
- 249th Machine Gun Company
- 18th Machine Gun Battalion (Note: 18th Machine Gun Battalion was organised in November 1918 from the 207th, 238th, 239th and 249th Machine Gun Companies.)
- 37th, 38th, 39th and 40th Combined Field Ambulances, RAMC
- No. 12 Mobile Veterinary Section, AVC
- 18th Division Train, ASC

== Commanders ==
The division was commanded from 7 January 1918 by Major-General H.D. Fanshawe and from 12 March 1919 by Major-General Theodore Fraser.

== See also ==
- List of Indian divisions in World War I

== Bibliography ==
- Haythornthwaite, Philip J. (1996). The World War One Source Book. London: Arms and Armour Press. ISBN 1-85409-351-7.
- Kempton, Chris (2003a). 'Loyalty & Honour', The Indian Army September 1939 – August 1947. Vol. Part I Divisions. Milton Keynes: The Military Press. ISBN 0-85420-228-5.
- Moberly, Frederick James (1927) [1923]. The Campaign in Mesopotamia 1914–1918. History of the Great War Based on Official Documents. Vol. I. London: HMSO. OCLC 772784341.
- Perry, F.W. (1993). Order of Battle of Divisions Part 5B. Indian Army Divisions. Newport: Ray Westlake Military Books. ISBN 1-871167-23-X.
- Wilson-Johnston, Lt.-Col. W.E. (2001) [1919]. Account of the Operations of the 18th (Indian) Division in Mesopotamia December 1917 to December 1918. Naval & Military Press. ISBN 978-1-84574-323-9.
