= 112th Infantry (British India) =

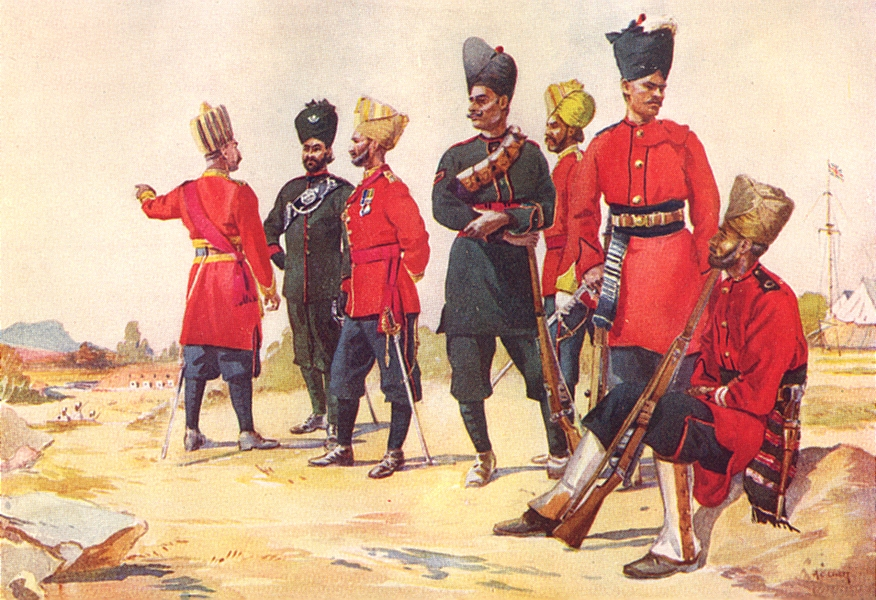
- A depiction of a subadar of the 112th Infantry (third from right) amongst other British Indian Army troops
- Active: 1796–1923
- Country: British India
- Branch: British Indian Army
- Type: Infantry
- Part of: Bombay Army (to 1895); Bombay Command
- Colors: Red; faced deep buff, 1884 yellow
- Engagements: Third Anglo-Maratha War conquest of Sindh; Indian Rebellion of 1857; World War I Waziristan campaign (1919–1920)

The 112th Infantry were originally an infantry regiment of the East India Company's Bombay Army and later the British Indian Army. The regiment traces their origins to 1796, when they were raised as the 2nd Battalion, 6th Regiment of Bombay Native Infantry.

The regiments first action was on the Battle of Khadki in the Third Anglo-Maratha War. They also took part in the Battle of Miani and the Battle of Hyderabad during the conquest of Sindh. They next took part in the central Indian campaign after the Indian Rebellion of 1857. During World War I they were attached to the 17th Indian Division in the Mesopotamia Campaign. They were involved in the action at Fat-ha Gorge on the Little Zab and the Battle of Sharqat in October 1918.

After World War I the Indian government reformed the army moving from single battalion regiments to multi battalion regiments. In 1922, the 112th Infantry became the 5th Battalion 4th Bombay Grenadiers. However in April 1923 the battalion was ordered to be disbanded, which was completed by the end of September 1923.

== Predecessor names ==
- 2nd Battalion, 6th Regiment of Bombay Native Infantry – 1796
- 12th Bombay Native Infantry – 1824
- 12th Bombay Infantry – 1885
- 112th Infantry – 1903

== Bibliography ==
- Barthorp, Michael; Burn, Jeffrey (1979). Indian infantry regiments 1860–1914. Osprey Publishing. ISBN 0-85045-307-0.
- Rinaldi, Richard A (2008). Order of Battle British Army 1914. Ravi Rikhye. ISBN 978-0-9776072-8-0.
- Sharma, Gautam (1990). Valour and sacrifice: famous regiments of the Indian Army. Allied Publishers. ISBN 81-7023-140-X.
- Sumner, Ian (2001). The Indian Army 1914–1947. Osprey Publishing. ISBN 1-84176-196-6.
- Moberly, Frederick James (1927) [1923]. The Campaign in Mesopotamia 1914–1918. History of the Great War Based on Official Documents. Vol. I. London: HMSO. OCLC 772784341.
