= 116th Mahrattas =

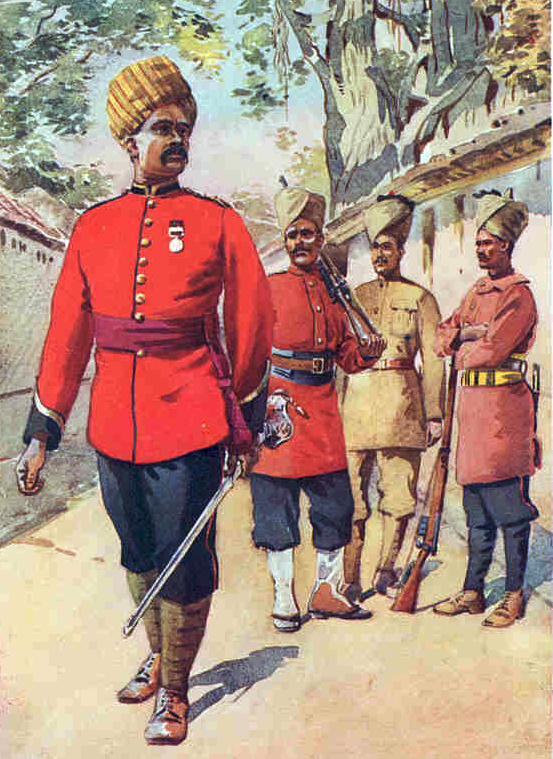
- Soldier of the regiment (second from right) with other Mahratta Infantry, painted in 1911.
- Active: 1800-1922
- Country: British India
- Branch: British Indian Army
- Type: Infantry
- Part of: Bombay Army (to 1895); Bombay Command
- Colors: Red; faced light buff, 1882 yellow
- Engagements: Second Afghan War; World War I Gwalior Campaign

The 116th Mahrattas were an infantry regiment of the British Indian Army. The regiment traces their origins to 1800, when they were raised as the 2nd Battalion, 7th Regiment of Bombay Native Infantry.

During World War I the regiment was attached to the 18th Indian Division for the Mesopotamia Campaign. They were involved in the Actions at the Fat-ha Gorge and on the Little Zab and the Battle of Sharqat in October 1918.

After World War I the Indian government reformed the army moving from single battalion regiments to multi battalion regiments. In 1922, the 116th Mahrattas became the 4th Battalion 5th Mahratta Light Infantry. After independence they were one of the regiments allocated to the Indian Army.

== Predecessor names ==
- 2nd Battalion, 8th Regiment of Bombay Native Infantry - 1800
- 16th Bombay Native Infantry - 1824
- 16th Bombay Infantry - 1885
- 116th Mahrattas - 1903

== Sources ==
- Barthorp, Michael; Burn, Jeffrey (1979). Indian infantry regiments 1860-1914. Osprey Publishing. ISBN 0-85045-307-0.
- Rinaldi, Richard A (2008). Order of Battle British Army 1914. Ravi Rikhye. ISBN 978-0-9776072-8-0.
- Sharma, Gautam (1990). Valour and sacrifice: famous regiments of the Indian Army. Allied Publishers. ISBN 81-7023-140-X.
- Sumner, Ian (2001). The Indian Army 1914-1947. Osprey Publishing. ISBN 1-84176-196-6.
- Moberly, F.J. (September 1997). Official History of the War: Mesopotamia Campaign. Imperial War Museum. ISBN 1-870423-30-5.
