= 109th Infantry =

British Indian Army regiment

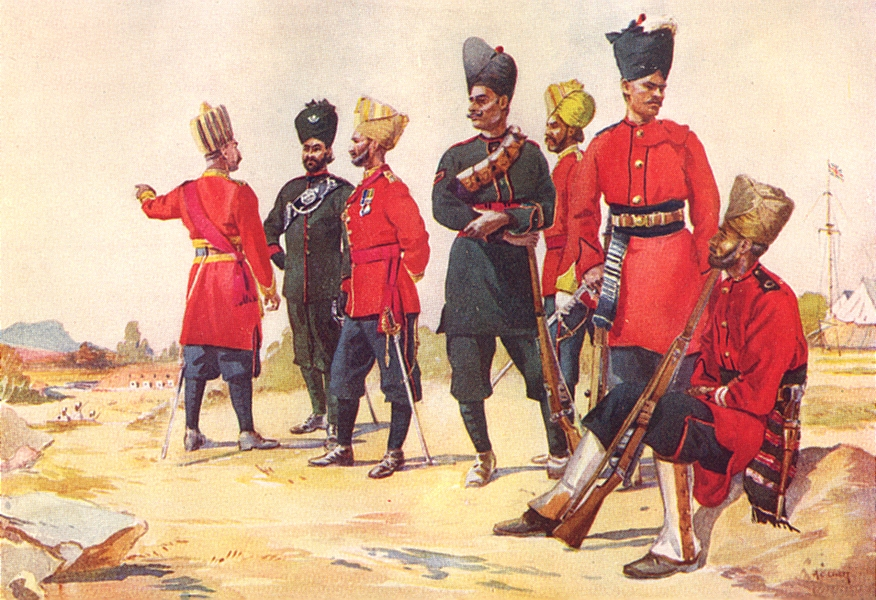
- A depiction of a 109th Infantry soldier (second from right) among other British Indian Army troops
- Active: 1768–1922
- Country: British India
- Allegiance: East India Company (till 1858); British Indian Army (1858–1949)British India (1858–
- Branch: British Indian Army
- Type: Infantry
- Part of: Bombay Army (to 1895); Bombay Command
- Uniform: Red; faced black
- Engagements: Third Anglo-Mysore War; Fourth Anglo-Mysore War; Second Anglo-Sikh War; Second Afghan War; World War I

The 109th Infantry was an infantry regiment of the British Indian Army. The regiment traces its origins to 1768, when it was raised as the 5th Battalion, Bombay Sepoys.

The regiment's first action was during the Mysore Campaign in the Third Anglo-Mysore War. It was next involved in the Battle of Seringapatam in the Fourth Anglo-Mysore War, and next used in the Siege of Multan during the Second Anglo-Sikh War. Its last campaign in the 19th century was the Second Afghan War. During World War I it was attached to the Aden Brigade, which was formed to protect the important naval refueling point at Aden.

After World War I the Indian government reformed the army moving from single- to multi-battalion regiments. In 1922, the 109th Infantry became the 4th Battalion 4th Bombay Grenadiers. After independence it was one of the regiments allocated to the Indian Army.

== Predecessor names ==
- 5th Battalion, Bombay Sepoys - 1768
- 2nd Battalion, 1st Bombay Native Infantry - 1796
- 9th Bombay Native Infantry - 1824
- 9th Bombay Infantry - 1885
- 109th Infantry - 1903

== Bibliography ==
- Barthorp, Michael; Burn, Jeffrey (1979). Indian infantry regiments 1860-1914. Osprey Publishing. ISBN 0-85045-307-0.
- Rinaldi, Richard A (2008). Order of Battle British Army 1914. Ravi Rikhye. ISBN 978-0-9776072-8-0.
- Sharma, Gautam (1990). Valour and sacrifice: famous regiments of the Indian Army. Allied Publishers. ISBN 81-7023-140-X.
- Sumner, Ian (2001). The Indian Army 1914-1947. Osprey Publishing. ISBN 1-84176-196-6.
- Moberly, F. J. (1 September 1997) [1923]. Official History of the War: Mesopotamia Campaign. London: Imperial War Museum. ISBN 1-870423-30-5.
