= 114th Mahrattas =

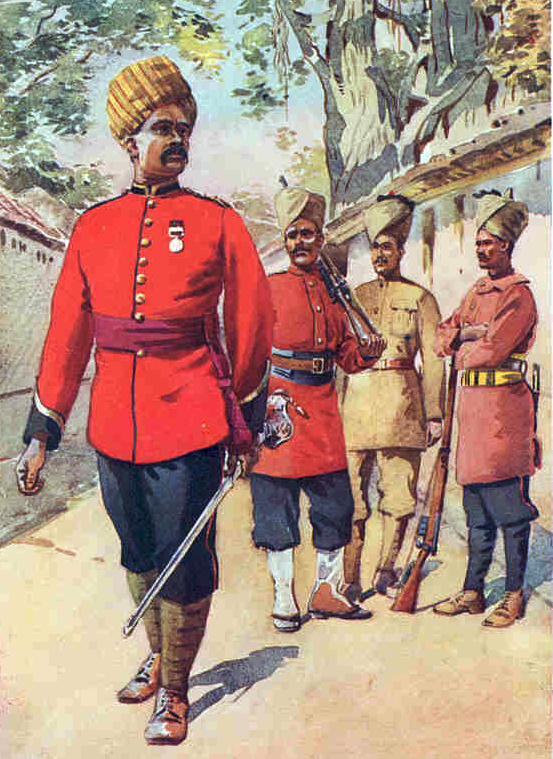
- Soldier of the regiment (far right) with other Mahratta Infantry, painted in 1911.
- Active: 1806–1922
- Country: British India
- Branch: British Indian Army
- Type: Infantry
- Part of: Bombay Army (to 1895); Bombay Command
- Colors: Red; faced light buff, 1882 yellow
- Engagements: World War I

The 114th Mahrattas were an infantry regiment of the British Indian Army. The regiment traces their origins to 1800, when they were raised as the 2nd Battalion, 7th Regiment of Bombay Native Infantry.

During World War I they were attached to the 17th Indian Division for the Mesopotamia Campaign. They took part in the action at Fat-ha Gorge on the Little Zab and the Battle of Sharqat, in October 1918.

After World War I the Indian government reformed the army moving from single battalion regiments to multi battalion regiments. In 1922, the 114th Mahrattas became the 10th (Training) Battalion 5th Mahratta Light Infantry. After independence they were one of the regiments allocated to the Indian Army.

== Predecessor names ==
- 2nd Battalion, 7th Regiment of Bombay Native Infantry - 1800
- 14th Bombay Native Infantry - 1824
- 14th Bombay Infantry - 1885
- 114th Mahrattas - 1903

== Sources ==
- Barthorp, Michael; Burn, Jeffrey (1979). Indian infantry regiments 1860-1914. Osprey Publishing. ISBN 0-85045-307-0.
- Rinaldi, Richard A (2008). Order of Battle British Army 1914. Ravi Rikhye. ISBN 978-0-9776072-8-0.
- Sharma, Gautam (1990). Valour and sacrifice: famous regiments of the Indian Army. Allied Publishers. ISBN 81-7023-140-X.
- Sumner, Ian (2001). The Indian Army 1914-1947. Osprey Publishing. ISBN 1-84176-196-6.
- Moberly, Frederick James (1927) [1923]. The Campaign in Mesopotamia 1914–1918. History of the Great War Based on Official Documents. Vol. I. London: HMSO. OCLC 772784341.
