= Rakesh Singh Malhan =

Indian Army officer (1970–1992)

Second Lieutenant Rakesh Singh Malhan AC
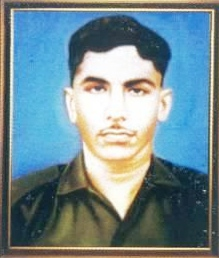
- Portrait of 2nd Lt Rakesh Singh
- Born: September 18, 1970; Chandigarh, India
- Died: December 5, 1992 (aged 22); Shopian, Jammu and Kashmir, India
- Military career
- Allegiance: India
- Branch: Indian Army
- Rank: Second Lieutenant
- Service number: IC-51242I
- Unit: 22 Grenadiers
- Awards: Ashoka Chakra

Second Lieutenant Rakesh Singh (18 September 1970 – 5 December 1992) was an Indian Army officer, awarded the Ashoka Chakra, India's highest peacetime military decoration. His parental village is Subana which is located in Jhajjar Distt of Haryana.

== Early life ==
Singh was born on 18 September 1970. His father was Col Raj Singh.

== Military career ==
Cdt Rakesh joined the 78th course of the National Defence Academy in 1986. He was commissioned into 22nd battalion of Grenadiers as a second lieutenant on 13 June 1992. Less than six months later, he died on 5 December 1992 at the age of 22 from injuries sustained whilst attempting to cut off the escape of eight fleeing Afghan Mujahadeen who had been flushed out during operations. Single-handedly, he managed to kill five of the Mujahadeen, but sustained injuries during the encounter and died of his injuries.

In 1993 he was awarded India's highest peace time gallantry award, the Ashoka Chakra for his supreme sacrifice.
