= 14th King George's Own Ferozepore Sikhs =

14th Sikhs
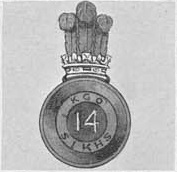
- Active: 1846–1922
- Country: Indian Empire
- Branch: Army
- Type: Infantry
- Part of: Bengal Army (to 1895); Bengal Command
- Uniform: Red; faced yellow
- Engagements: Lucknow; 1878–80 Afghanistan; 1878 Ali Masjid; Defence of Chitral; 1900 China

Commanders
- Colonel-in-Chief: George V (1906)

The 14th (King George's Own) Ferozepore Sikhs was a regiment of the British Indian Army; they can trace their origins to the Regiment of Ferozepore formed in 1846. The regiment had a number of different titles over the following years: the 14th Bengal Native Infantry 1861–1864, the 14th (The Ferozepore) Regiment of Bengal Native Infantry 1864–1885, the 14th Regiment of Bengal Native Infantry (Ferozepore Sikhs) 1885–1901, the 14th (Ferozepore) Sikh Infantry 1901–1903 and finally, after the Kitchener reforms of the Indian Army in 1903, the 14th Ferozepore Sikhs.

The regiment was part of the international force compiled in China to fight the Boxer Rebellion 1900, and left China two years later.

Further changes in name followed: the 14th Prince of Wales's Own Ferozepore Sikhs 1906–1910, the 14th (King George's Own) Ferozepore Sikhs 1910–1922. To honour the visit of the Prince and Princess of Wales to Indian they took part in the Rawalpindi Parade 1905.

In World War I they took part in the Gallipoli Campaign with the 29th Indian Brigade and the Mesopotamia Campaign with the 51st Indian Brigade, 17th Indian Division.

In the post World War I reforms of the Indian Army they were amalgamated into a large regiment and became the 1st Battalion 11th Sikh Regiment. After the independence of India the regiment was allocated to the present-day Indian Army.

== Battle and theatre honours ==
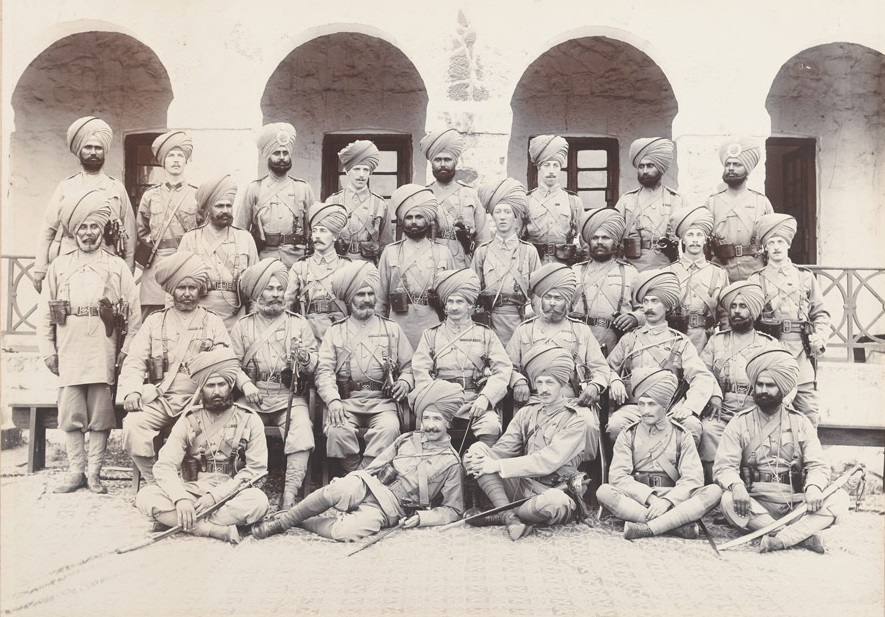
14th Ferozepore Sikhs en route for China, 1900

Lucknow, 1878 Afghanistan, 1878 Ali Masjid, Defence of Chitral 1895, China 1900, The Great War

== Name changes ==
- Regiment of Ferozepore (1846–1861)
- 15th Regiment (1861)
- 14th Bengal Native Infantry (1861–1864)
- 14th (The Ferozepore) Regiment of Bengal Native Infantry (1864–1885)
- 14th Regiment of Bengal Native Infantry (Ferozepore Sikhs) (1885–1901)
- 14th (Ferozepore) Sikh Infantry (1901–1903)
- 14th Ferozepore Sikhs (1903–1906)
- 14th Prince of Wales's Own Ferozepore Sikhs (1906–1910)
- 14th (King George's Own) Ferozepore Sikhs (1910–1922)

== Campaigns ==
- Siege of Lucknow
- Second Anglo-Afghan War
- Boxer Rebellion
- World War I

== Sources ==
- Barthorp, Michael; Burn, Jeffrey (1979). Indian infantry regiments 1860–1914. Osprey Publishing. ISBN 0-85045-307-0.
- Sumner, Ian (2001). The Indian Army 1914-1947. Osprey Publishing. ISBN 1-84176-196-6.
