= 113th Infantry =

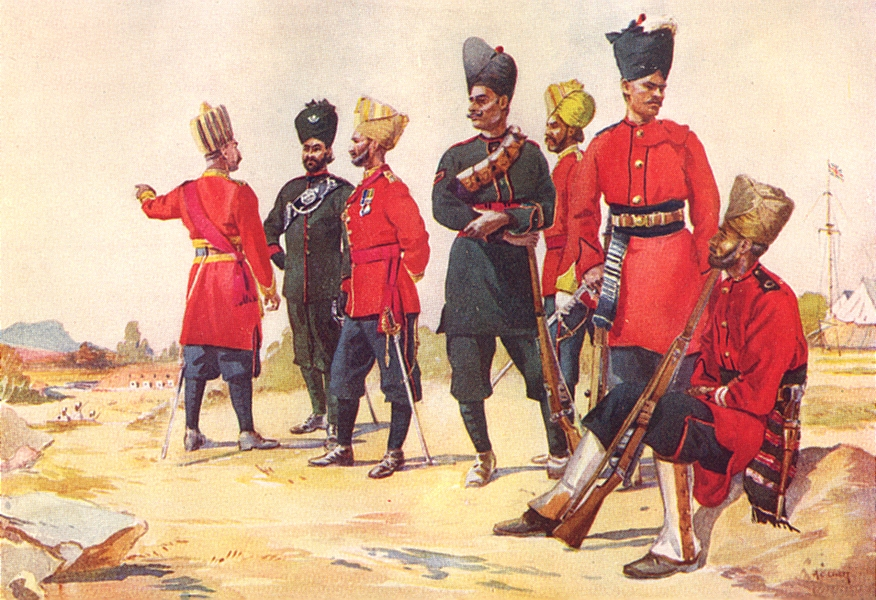
- A depiction of a subadar-major of the 113th Infantry (far left) amongst other British Indian Army troops.
- Active: 1800–1922
- Country: British India
- Branch: British Indian Army
- Type: Infantry
- Part of: Bombay Army (to 1895); Bombay Command
- Colors: Red; faced buff, 1882 yellow
- Engagements: French Revolutionary Wars; Third Anglo-Maratha War; Beni Boo Ali campaign Indian Rebellion of 1857; World War I

The 113th Infantry were an infantry regiment of the British Indian Army. The regiment traces their origins to 1800, when they were raised as the 1st Battalion, 7th Regiment of Bombay Native Infantry.

The regiment's first action was in Egypt during the Battle of Alexandria part of the French Revolutionary Wars. They then took part in the Battle of Khadki in the Third Anglo-Maratha War. They were then used in the punitive expedition in the Beni Boo Ali campaign in 1821, against the pirates in Eastern Arabia and the Persian Gulf. They next took part in the central Indian campaign after the Indian Rebellion of 1857. During World War I they were attached to the 17th Indian Division for the Mesopotamia Campaign. They took part in the action at Fat-ha Gorge on the Little Zab and the Battle of Sharqat, in October 1918.

After World War I the Indian government reformed the army moving from single battalion regiments to multi battalion regiments. In 1922, the 113th Infantry became the 10th (Training) Battalion 4th Bombay Grenadiers. After independence they were one of the regiments allocated to the Indian Army.

== Predecessor names ==
- 1st Battalion, 7th Regiment of Bombay Native Infantry - 1800
- 13th Bombay Native Infantry - 1824
- 13th Bombay Infantry - 1885
- 113th Infantry - 1903

== Sources ==
- Barthorp, Michael; Burn, Jeffrey (1979). Indian infantry regiments 1860-1914. Osprey Publishing. ISBN 0-85045-307-0.
- Rinaldi, Richard A (2008). Order of Battle British Army 1914. Ravi Rikhye. ISBN 978-0-9776072-8-0.
- Sharma, Gautam (1990). Valour and sacrifice: famous regiments of the Indian Army. Allied Publishers. ISBN 81-7023-140-X.
- Sumner, Ian (2001). The Indian Army 1914-1947. Osprey Publishing. ISBN 1-84176-196-6.
- Moberly, Frederick James (1927) [1923]. The Campaign in Mesopotamia 1914–1918. History of the Great War Based on Official Documents. Vol. I. London: HMSO. OCLC 772784341.
