= 94th Russell's Infantry =

- Active: 1813–1922
- Country: Indian Empire
- Branch: Army
- Type: Infantry
- Part of: Nizam's Contingent; Hyderabad Contingent; Madras Command
- Colors: Red; faced dark green
- Engagements: Third Anglo-Maratha War; World War I

The 94th Russell's Infantry were an infantry regiment of the British Indian Army. They could trace their origins to 1813, when they were raised as the 1st Battalion of the Russell Brigade for the Princely state of Hyderabad. Until 1853, the regiment was part of the Nizam of Hydrabad's Army then after signing of a treaty with the then Governor General of India, The Nizam's Contingent was renamed as the Hyderabad Contingent and became part of the regular Indian Army.

In 1914 the regiment comprised three companies of Rajputs, three companies of Hindustani Muslims, and one company of Ahirs (who now reside in modern Indian state of Rajasthan and Haryana) and was stationed in Bombay. The regiment stayed in India for the first three years of World War One (1914-1918), transferring to Mesopotamia in the autumn of 1917. In December 1918 the unit transferred to Salonika and from there moved to Turkey where it participated in the post-war occupation.

The regiment fought in the Battle of Mahidpur during the Third Anglo-Maratha War. They then participated in the Siege of Nowah and the later Capture of Nowah. During World War I the regiment was part of the 18th Indian Division and took part in the Mesopotamia Campaign. The Division was attached to the Tigris Corps and was involved in the Actions at the Fat-ha Gorge and on the Little Zab between the 23–26 October 1918 and the Battle of Sharqat between 28–30 October 1918.

After World War I the Indian government reformed the army moving from single battalion regiments to multi battalion regiments. In 1922, the 94th Russell's Infantry became the 1st Battalion, 19th Hyderabad Regiment. This regiment was allocated to the Indian Army after independence.

== Predecessor names ==
- 1st Battalion of the Russell Brigade - 1813
- 1st Regiment of Infantry, Nizam's Army - 1826
- 1st Infantry, Hyderabad Contingent - 1854
- 94th Russell's Infantry - 1903
