= Battle of Sharqat =

1918 battle in present-day Iraq

- Part of the Mesopotamian campaign of World War I
Date	28–30 October 1918
Location	Shirqat, Ottoman Iraq
Result	British–Assyrian victory

Belligerents
British Empire; India; Assyrian volunteers	Ottoman Empire

Commanders and leaders
William Marshall; Alexander Cobbe; Malik Yaqo; Agha Petros	İsmail Hakkı Bey

Strength
2 infantry divisions, 2 cavalry brigades	"Tigris Group" (Dicle Grubu) of Ottoman Sixth Army; five infantry regiments and one rifle regiment

Casualties and losses
1,800	11,322–13,000 POW with many more wounded and killed

The Battle of Sharqat (28–30 October 1918) was fought between the British and the Ottoman Empire in the Mesopotamian Campaign during World War I. It was the last battle fought in Ottoman Iraq during the First World War and one of the final conflicts between the British Empire and the Ottoman Empire.

== Background ==
Anticipating an Ottoman armistice following the defeat of the Ottomans in Palestine and the recent surrender of Bulgaria, British Premier David Lloyd George ordered Sir William Marshall, Commander-in-Chief on the Mesopotamian front, to remove any residual Ottoman presence from that theater by twin advances up the Euphrates and Tigris rivers, and capture the oil fields near Mosul on the Tigris. There was a lack of available transport, after a large amount had been supplied to Dunsterforce for its advance across Persia, so Marshall persuaded the government to limit the advance to the Tigris Front only.

== Battle ==
An Anglo-Indian force consisting of the 17th and 18th Indian Divisions and the 7th and 11th Indian Cavalry Brigades, led by Sir Alexander Cobbe, left Baghdad on October 23, 1918. In 39 hours they covered 120 kilometres (75 mi) to the Little Zab River, where the "Dicle Group" of the Ottoman Sixth Army, led by İsmail Hakkı Bey, who was the commander of the Ottoman 14th Division, was awaiting them. The Sixth Army had been weakened due to lack of replacements. His forces consisted of the XVIII Corps, which comprised the 14th and 46th Divisions, and the XIII Corps, which comprised the 2nd and 6th Divisions.

Seeing his army's rear threatened, İsmail Hakkı Bey withdrew another 100 kilometers (62 mi) to the north to Al-Shirqat, where Cobbe attacked him on October 29, sending the 11th Cavalry Brigade to pin the Ottoman front while the 17th Division came up to support them. The 17th were delayed in arriving, and the cavalry were shelled by Ottoman guns overnight. In the morning the 13th Hussars charged the hill where the guns were, and made a dismounted charge up it with fixed bayonets, successfully capturing the guns. İsmail Hakkı Bey was aware of the peace talks at Mudros, and decided to spare his men rather than fight or break out. He surrendered on October 30. The 18th Division advanced on Mosul, 50 miles further north, and were 12 miles short of the town when the armistice was declared.

== Aftermath ==
On November 1, 1918, Mosul was peacefully occupied by the 7th and 11th Indian cavalry brigades, after the British forces did not comply with the request of the Ottoman Commander-in-chief, Ali İhsan (Sâbis), to withdraw to the positions they had held at the armistice.

== Sources ==
- Moberly, F. J. Official History of the War: Mesopotamia Campaign. Imperial War Museum, Volume IV 1927. Reprint edition 2011. ISBN 1-84574-939-1.
- Erickson, Edward J. Ordered to Die: A history of the Ottoman Army in the First World War. Westport, Connecticut: Greenwood Press, 2001. ISBN 0-31309-558-2.
