= 33rd Indian Brigade =

- Active: March 1915 – 7 December 1915
- Country: British India
- Allegiance: British Crown
- Branch: British Indian Army
- Type: Infantry
- Size: Brigade
- Part of: 12th Indian Division
- Engagements: First World War Mesopotamian Campaign

Commanders
- Notable commanders: Maj.-Gen. G.F. Gorringe

The 33rd Indian Brigade was an infantry brigade of the British Indian Army that saw active service with the Indian Army during the First World War. It took part in the Mesopotamian campaign in 1915 before being broken up at the end of the year.

== History ==
The 33rd Indian Brigade was formed in Mesopotamia in March 1915 as part of the 12th Indian Division, with the last elements arriving at Basra on 9 April. On 18 August, the HQ was transferred to Bushire and the HQ was reformed in the division. The brigade was broken up on 7 December and replaced by the 34th Indian Brigade. The only significant action the brigade was involved with was the Occupation of Nasiriya on 25 July.

== Order of battle ==
The brigade commanded the following units in the First World War:

- 1/4th Battalion, Hampshire Regiment (joined from Rawalpindi Brigade, 2nd (Rawalpindi) Division in March 1915; attached to 30th Indian Brigade May to October; joined the 1/5th (The Weald of Kent) Battalion, Buffs (East Kent Regiment) as the Composite Territorial Battalion in February 1916 in 35th Indian Brigade)
- 11th Rajputs (joined from Presidency Brigade, 8th (Lucknow) Division in March 1915; left for Bushire in July)
- 66th Punjabis (joined from 5th (Jhelum) Brigade, 2nd (Rawalpindi) Division in March 1915; to 16th (Poona) Brigade, 6th (Poona) Division in October)
- 67th Punjabis (joined from Lorelai, 4th (Quetta) Division in March 1915; to 12th Indian Brigade in April)
- 4th Prince Albert Victor's Rajputs (joined from 12th Indian Brigade in July 1915; to Corps Troops in December)
- 43rd Erinpura Regiment (joined from Chaman, 4th (Quetta) Division in August 1915; to Corps Troops in October)
- 20th Punjabis (joined from 16th (Poona) Brigade, 6th (Poona) Division in October 1915; to Corps Troops in December)

== Commanders ==
The brigade had the following commanders in the First World War:

From	Rank	Name	Notes
11 March 1915	Major-General	G.F. Gorringe	
6 May 1915	Brigadier-General	R. Wapshare	sick, 15 July
7 August 1915	Brigadier-General	H.T. Brooking	transferred to Bushire on 18 August
16 September 1915	Brigadier-General	J.A. Douglas	broken up 7 December

== Bibliography ==
- Perry, F.W. (1993). Order of Battle of Divisions Part 5B. Indian Army Divisions. Newport: Ray Westlake Military Books. ISBN 1-871167-23-X.
