= 59th Indian Brigade =

- Active: June 1918
- Country: British India
- Allegiance: British Crown
- Branch: British Indian Army
- Type: Infantry
- Size: Brigade
- Part of: 6th Poona Divisional Area; 2nd (Rawalpindi) Division
- Service: First World War

The 59th Indian Brigade was an infantry brigade of the British Indian Army that formed part of the Indian Army during the First World War. It remained in India throughout the war. It was not reformed for the Second World War.

== History ==
The Headquarters 59th Indian Brigade was formed at Ahmednagar under 6th Poona Divisional Area in June 1918. The 58th Indian Brigade was formed at the same time, presumably to command the units forming Ahmednagar at this time. (Note: Units at Ahmednagar in June 1918 were: 2nd (Garrison) Battalion, Northumberland Fusiliers; 2nd Battalion, 48th Pioneers; 2nd Battalion, 61st King George's Own Pioneers; 2nd Battalion, 90th Punjabis; 2nd Battalion, 96th Berar Infantry; 2nd Battalion, 99th Deccan Infantry; 2nd Battalion, 102nd King Edward's Own Grenadiers; 2nd Battalion, 117th Mahrattas; 2nd Battalion, 125th Napier's Rifles; 2nd Battalion, 128th Pioneers; 1st Battalion, 150th Infantry; 3rd Battalion, 150th Infantry) In November 1918, both brigades – without any units – were transferred to the 2nd (Rawalpindi) Division.

== Commander ==
The brigade was commanded from 14 June 1918 by Brigadier-General D.R. Adye.

== Bibliography ==
- Kempton, Chris (2003). 'Loyalty & Honour', The Indian Army September 1939 – August 1947. Vol. Part II Brigades. Milton Keynes: The Military Press. ISBN 0-85420-238-2.
- Perry, F.W. (1993). Order of Battle of Divisions Part 5B. Indian Army Divisions. Newport: Ray Westlake Military Books. ISBN 1-871167-23-X.
