= 12th Indian Brigade =

- Active: January 1915 – March 1919
- Country: British India
- Allegiance: British Crown
- Branch: British Indian Army
- Type: Infantry
- Size: Brigade
- Part of: 12th Indian Division; 15th Indian Division
- Engagements: First World War Mesopotamian Campaign Capture of Ramadi Action of Khan Baghdadi

Commanders
- Notable commanders: Br.-Gen. Edmund Costello VC

The 12th Indian Brigade was an infantry brigade of the British Indian Army that saw active service in the First World War. It served in the Mesopotamian Campaign on the Euphrates Front throughout its existence.

== History ==
The 12th Indian Brigade was formed at Nasirabad in 5th (Mhow) Division in January 1915. It was transferred to Mesopotamia and joined the 12th Indian Division on formation at the end of March.

12th Indian Division

With the division, the brigade took part in the Actions for Nasiriya (5, 13 – 14, 24 July) and the Occupation of Nasiriya (25 July) in 1915 and the Affair of Butaniya on 14 January 1916. The division never reached full strength as units were constantly detached to support the efforts to relieve the 6th (Poona) Division besieged at Kut. The division was broken up on 10 March 1916 and the brigade was posted to the new 15th Indian Division in May 1916.

15th Indian Division

The 15th Indian Division was formed on 7 May 1916 to replace the 12th Indian Division on the Euphrates Front; the brigade joined the division on formation. It remained with the division on the Euphrates Front until the end of the war. The brigade took part in the action of As Sahilan (11 September 1916), the Capture of Ramadi (28 and 29 September 1917), the Occupation of Hīt (9 March 1918) and the action of Khan Baghdadi (26 and 27 March 1918).

At the end of the war, the division was rapidly run down and it (along with the brigade) was disbanded in March 1919.

== Order of battle ==
The brigade commanded the following units in the First World War:

- 2nd Battalion, Queen's Own (Royal West Kent Regiment) (joined from Nasirabad Brigade, 5th (Mhow) Division in January 1915; in November 1915, half of the battalion joined 30th Indian Brigade, 6th (Poona) Division and the other half to 34th Indian Brigade, 12th Indian Division)
- 90th Punjabis (joined from Nasirabad Brigade, 5th (Mhow) Division)
- 44th Mherwara Infantry (joined from Nasirabad Brigade, 5th (Mhow) Division; to Corps Troops in June 1915)
- 4th Prince Albert Victor's Rajputs (joined from Multan, 3rd Lahore Divisional Area; in June 1915 posted to 33rd Indian Brigade, 12th Indian Division)
- 67th Punjabis (joined from 33rd Indian Brigade, 12th Indian Division in April 1915; in November 1915, half of the battalion joined 30th Indian Brigade, 6th (Poona) Division and the other half to Corps Troops)
- 1/5th Battalion, Queen's (Royal West Surrey Regiment) (joined from 34th Indian Brigade, 12th Indian Division in February 1916)
- 1st Battalion, 43rd Erinpura Infantry (joined from Corp Troops in June 1916)
- 128th Machine Gun Company (joined from Corp Troops in August 1916)
- 2nd Battalion, 39th Garhwal Rifles (joined in April 1917 from Delhi, 7th Meerut Divisional Area)
- 12th Light Trench Mortar Battery ('M' Light Trench Mortar Battery joined 15th Division in September 1917 and assigned to the brigade in February 1918)

== Commanders ==
The brigade had the following commanders:

From	Rank	Name	Notes
19 January 1915	Brigadier-General	K.E. Lean	sick, 29 May 1915
29 May 1915	Lieutenant-Colonel	H.A. Dunlop	temporary
31 July 1915	Brigadier-General	C.L. Macnab	
20 September 1915	Brigadier-General	H.T. Brooking	
11 May 1916	Lieutenant-Colonel	W.L. Malcolm	temporary
16 June 1916	Brigadier-General	F.P.S. Dunsford	sick, 19 February 1918
19 February 1918	Lieutenant-Colonel	Hon. A.G. Brodrick	temporary
4 May 1918	Brigadier-General	E.W. Costello VC	

== Bibliography ==
- Perry, F.W. (1993). Order of Battle of Divisions Part 5B. Indian Army Divisions. Newport: Ray Westlake Military Books. ISBN 1-871167-23-X.
