= 6th Poona Divisional Area =

6th Poona Divisional Area Poona Division
- Active: October 1914 – June 1920
- Country: British India
- Allegiance: British Crown
- Branch: British Indian Army
- Type: Infantry
- Size: Division
- Part of: Southern Army; Southern Command
- Garrison/HQ: Poona
- Service: First World War

Commanders
- Notable commanders: Maj.-Gen. G.F. Gorringe; Brig.-Gen. F.J. Fowler

The 6th Poona Divisional Area was an infantry division of the British Indian Army that formed part of the Indian Army during the First World War. It was formed in October 1914 to replace the original 6th (Poona) Division that had been mobilized in September 1914 for service in Mesopotamia. It was renamed as Poona Division in June 1917 and remained in India throughout the war. The division was redesignated as Poona District in 1920.

== History ==
At the outbreak of the First World War, the 6th (Poona) Division was mobilized in September 1914 and sailed from Bombay on 16 October for Mesopotamia. The 6th Poona Divisional Area was formed in October 1914 to take over the area responsibilities of the 6th (Poona) Division. It took over the units left behind by the original division and initially only commanded Bombay Brigade, joined by the reformed Poona Brigade in December. However, the Ahmednagar Brigade was not formed until May 1918, followed by the 58th and 59th Indian Brigades in June. Bombay Brigade became independent in the same month.

The division served in India throughout the war, initially under Southern Army, then Southern Command from January 1918. From early 1918, the division was responsible for a significant part of the expansion of the British Indian Army.

In 1918, the division was responsible for posts and stations at Ahmednagar, Anandi, Arangaon, Belgaum, Dhond, Kirkee, Kholapur, Manmad, Poona and Satara. Bombay Brigade was responsible for Ahmedabad, Baroda, Bombay, Colaba, Dadar, Deolali, Nasik, Rajkot and Santa Cruz. It was renamed Poona Division in June 1917 and was redesignated as Poona District in June 1920.

== Order of battle ==
The division commanded the following brigades in the First World War:

- Bombay Brigade – joined in October 1914 from 6th (Poona) Division; became an independent formation in June 1918
- Poona Brigade (Note: 6th (Poona) Division mobilized with 16th (Poona), 17th (Ahmednagar) and 18th (Belgaum) Brigades. They are not to be confused with the Poona and Ahmednagar Brigades reformed in the 6th Poona Divisional Area. Belgaum Brigade was not reformed.) – formed in December 1914
- Ahmednagar Brigade – formed in May 1918
- 58th Indian Brigade – formed in June 1918; transferred to 2nd (Rawalpindi) Division in November 1918
- 59th Indian Brigade – formed in June 1918; transferred to 2nd (Rawalpindi) Division in November 1918

== Commanders ==
The 6th Poona Divisional Area / Poona Division had the following commanders:

From	Rank	Name	Notes
October 1914	Major-General	George Frederick Gorringe	
16 March 1915	Brigadier-General	Harry Triscott Brooking	
29 July 1915	Brigadier-General	Maitland Cowper	
22 November 1915	Major-General	Richard Wapshare	
2 December 1916	Brigadier-General	Francis John Fowler	
22 July 1917	Lieutenant-General	Sir Michael Joseph Tighe	Redesignated as Poona District in June 1920

== See also ==
- 6th (Poona) Division for the original division
- List of Indian divisions in World War I

== Bibliography ==
- Gaylor, John (1996). Sons of John Company: The Indian and Pakistan Armies 1903–1991 (2nd ed.). Tunbridge Wells: Parapress. ISBN 1-898594-41-4.
- Mackie, Colin (June 2015). "Army Commands 1900-2011" (PDF). www.gulabin.com. Archived from the original (PDF) on 5 July 2015.
- Perry, F.W. (1993). Order of Battle of Divisions Part 5B. Indian Army Divisions. Newport: Ray Westlake Military Books. ISBN 1-871167-23-X.
