= 42nd Indian Brigade =

- Active: 1 April 1916 – March 1919
- Country: British India
- Allegiance: British Crown
- Branch: British Indian Army
- Type: Infantry
- Size: Brigade
- Part of: 15th Indian Division
- Engagements: First World War Mesopotamian Campaign Capture of Ramadi Action of Khan Baghdadi

The 42nd Indian Brigade was an infantry brigade of the British Indian Army that saw active service with the Indian Army during the First World War. It served in the Mesopotamian Campaign on the Euphrates Front throughout its existence. It was not reformed for the Second World War.

== History ==
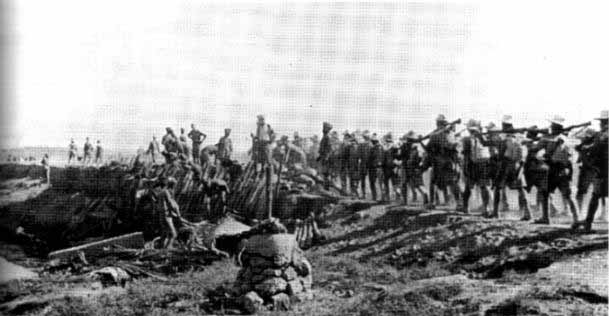
The 2nd Battalion, 6th Gurkha Rifles of 42nd Indian Brigade march towards the action of Khan Baghdadi

The 42nd Indian Brigade was formed in April 1916 and, on arrival in Mesopotamia, joined the 15th Indian Division when it was formed on 7 May 1916. The division replaced the 12th Indian Division on the Euphrates Front. The brigade remained with the division on the Euphrates Front until the end of the war. It took part in the action of As Sahilan (11 September 1916), the Capture of Ramadi (28 and 29 September 1917), the Occupation of Hīt (9 March 1918) and the action of Khan Baghdadi (26 and 27 March 1918).

At the end of the war, the division was rapidly run down and it (along with the brigade) was disbanded in March 1919.

== Order of battle ==
The brigade had the following composition in the First World War:

- 1/5th (Prince of Wales) Battalion, Devonshire Regiment (joined in February 1916 from 44th (Ferozepore) Brigade, 3rd Lahore Divisional Area; in April to the 41st Indian Brigade)
- 1/4th Battalion, Dorsetshire Regiment (joined in February 1916 from Ambala Brigade, 3rd Lahore Divisional Area)
- 2nd Battalion, 5th Gurkha Rifles (Frontier Force) (joined in April 1916 from 3rd (Abbottabad) Brigade, 2nd (Rawalpindi) Division)
- 2nd Battalion, 6th Gurkha Rifles (joined in April 1916 from 3rd (Abbottabad) Brigade, 2nd (Rawalpindi) Division; left in September 1918 for the 65th Brigade, British 22nd Division)
- 1st Battalion, 5th Gurkha Rifles (Frontier Force) (joined in March 1917 from 2nd (Nowshera) Brigade, 1st (Peshawar) Division; left in December 1918 for the 55th Indian Brigade, 18th Indian Division)
- 130th Machine Gun Company (joined from Corps Troops in August 1916)
- 42nd Light Trench Mortar Battery ('N' Light Trench Mortar Battery joined 15th Division in September 1917 and assigned to the brigade in February 1918)

== Commander ==
The brigade was commanded from 1 April 1916 by Brigadier-General F.G. Lucas.

== Bibliography ==
- Kempton, Chris (2003b). 'Loyalty & Honour', The Indian Army September 1939 – August 1947. Vol. Part II Brigades. Milton Keynes: The Military Press. ISBN 0-85420-238-2.
- Perry, F.W. (1993). Order of Battle of Divisions Part 5B. Indian Army Divisions. Newport: Ray Westlake Military Books. ISBN 1-871167-23-X.
