= 175 Medium Regiment (India) =

- Active: 1967 – present
- Country: India
- Allegiance: India
- Branch: Indian Army
- Type: Artillery
- Size: Regiment
- Mottos: Sarvatra, Izzat-O-Iqbal (Everywhere with Honour and Glory)
- Colors: Red & Navy Blue
- Anniversaries: 1 March – Raising Day

Insignia
- Abbreviation: 175 Med Regt

175 Medium Regiment is part of the Regiment of Artillery of the Indian Army.

== Formation ==
The regiment was raised as 175 Field Regiment on 1 March 1967 at Bangalore, with its first commanding officer as Lieutenant Colonel (later Brigadier) MR Rangappa. It consists of 1751, 1752 and 1753 batteries.

== Class composition ==
The regiment is a single class regiment with Sikh soldiers from Malwa, Majha and Doaba belts of Punjab.

== Equipment ==
At raising, the regiment was equipped with 100 mm Soviet field guns, and later converted to 76 mm mountain guns in 1980 at Ahirgarh, North-East Frontier Agency. Two years later, it converted to 75/24 Pack Howitzers. In 1990, the unit converted to 105 mm light field guns, when posted to Alhilal in Himachal Pradesh. Four years later in 1994, it changed over to Indian Field Guns. In 2004, the regiment was converted to a medium regiment and moved to Meerut. It was equipped with 130 mm guns. When it moved to Panzgam, it operated the Soltam 155 mm upgraded version of the same gun. It reverted to its 130 mm guns, when the unit moved to Alwar. Presently the unit is using the 155 mm Dhanush Artillery System.

== Operations ==
The regiment has taken part in the following operations –

- Indo-Pakistani War of 1971 – The regiment took part in Operation Cactus Lily between October 1971 and March 1972. It was part of the divisional artillery of 15 Infantry Division, which was tasked to defend Amritsar and Dera Baba Nanak sectors. Captain HS Kahlon, who was an OP Officer with 9 Punjab, distinguished himself in the defence of Ranian. He was awarded the Vir Chakra for his valour.
- Operation Meghdoot – The unit took part in operations in the Siachen Glacier between January and May 1989.
- Operation Rhino – The unit had multiple tenures in counter terrorist operations is Assam - December 1995 to April 1997, April 2001 to April 2002, June 2003 to August 2003, December 2003 to March 2004, and April 2004 to June 2004.
- Operation Vijay – the regiment took part in the operations between June and November 1999.
- Operation Parakram – April to December 2002.
- Operation Hifazat II – December 2002 to June 2003; August 2003 to August 2004.
- Operation Shanti Bahal – February 2016 (internal security duties in Jhajjar, Haryana during the Jat agitation).

== Gallantry awards ==
The regiment has won the following gallantry awards –

- Vir Chakra – 2 (Captain Harbant Singh Kahlon – Operation Cactus Lily, 1971, Captain Tejbans Singh Chehal – Operation Ibex, 1989)
- Shaurya Chakra – 1
- Sena Medal – 1 (Major Gagandeep Singh Kochhar)
- COAS Commendation Cards – 7
- VCOAS Commendation Cards – 1
- GOC-in-C Commendation Cards – 24

== See also ==
- List of artillery regiments of Indian Army
