= Action of Khan Baghdadi =

First world war military engagement

Coordinates: 33°51′9″N 42°32′51″E

- Part of the Mesopotamian campaign of World War I
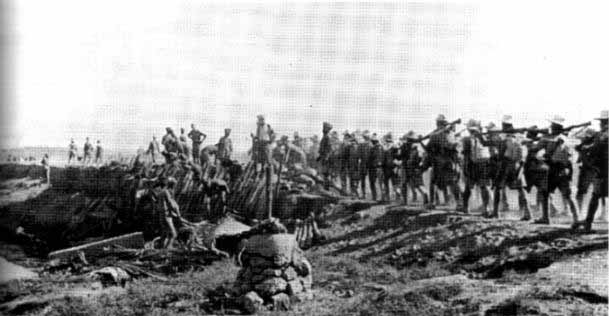
- The 2nd Battalion, 6th Gurkha Rifles of 42nd Indian Brigade, 15th Indian Division march towards the action of Khan Baghdadi, 22 March 1918
Date	26–27 March 1918
Location	Khan al Baghdadi, Ottoman Iraq
Result	British-Indian victory

Belligerents
United Kingdom and Empire: India	Ottoman Empire

Commanders and leaders
(United Kingdom of Great Britain and Ireland) Major General H. T. Brooking	(Ottoman Empire) Mustafa Kemal Bey

Strength
15th Indian Division	50th Infantry Division

Casualties and losses
159	~5,000 prisoners

The action of Khan Baghdadi was an engagement during the Mesopotamian campaign in World War I.

== Khan Baghdadi ==
The 15th Indian Division had been at Ramadi since its capture of the town in September 1917. On 9 March 1918, it advanced and occupied the town of Hit in a bloodless victory, the Ottoman forces evacuating without a shot being fired.

The next objective along the Euphrates was the town of Khan al Baghdadi. Most battles in Ottoman Iraq had been tied to the Tigris and Euphrates rivers. If an attack was successful, the loser would withdraw along the line of the river to prepared positions further back. Securing a proper victory was difficult. In an attempt to break with the usual pattern, the 15th Indian Division were supplied with 300 Ford lorries, the 8th Light Armoured Motor Battery (armoured cars), and the 11th Cavalry Brigade. A mobile blocking force was assembled using divisional infantry in the lorries, the armoured cars, the cavalry brigade, and one of the divisional artillery batteries equipped with double the usual number of horses.

This mobile force was then sent on a wide flanking march around Khan Baghdadi, and dug in behind the Ottoman positions. The remainder of the division then assaulted frontally in the normal fashion, and the Ottomans retreated from the town. They then ran unexpectedly into the blocking force, and their discipline quickly crumbled. The entire force of about 5,000 men were taken prisoner.

The mobile force was then dispatched further up the Euphrates in the direction the Ottomans had expected to retreat. The Ottoman commander Mustafa Kemal Bey decided to organize a retreat of his forces northwards. 46 miles further upstream was the settlement of Ana. Here was the main Ottoman supply base, which was now captured along with some high-ranking German officers attached to the Ottoman Army. The main Ottoman force under the command of Mustafa Kemal Pasha however had managed to successfully retreat further north and avoid capture.

This was the last attack on the Euphrates Front. The diversion of transport to Dunsterforce during the summer resulted in the CinC of the Mesopotamian Theatre, Sir William Marshall, restricting advances to the Tigris Front only. When the armistice was declared on 1 November 1918, the 15th Indian Division were back downriver at Fallujah.

== Notes and references ==
- Perry, F.W. (1993). History of the Great War: Order of Battle of Divisions: Indian Army Divisions Pt. 5B. Ray Westlake Books. ISBN 1-871167-23-X
- Moberly, Frederick James (1927) [1923]. The Campaign in Mesopotamia 1914–1918. History of the Great War Based on Official Documents. Vol. I. London: HMSO. OCLC 772784341.
- Barker, A.J. (1967). The Neglected War: Mesopotamia 1914-18, Faber and Faber. ISBN 0-571-08020-0
