= 841 Rocket Regiment (India) =

- Active: 1963 – present
- Country: India
- Allegiance: India
- Branch: Indian Army
- Type: Artillery
- Size: Regiment
- Motto(s): Sarvatra, Izzat-O-Iqbal (Everywhere with Honour and Glory)
- Colors: Red & Navy Blue
- Equipment: Pinaka multi-barrel rocket launcher

Insignia
- Abbreviation: 841 Rkt Regt

841 Rocket Regiment is part of the Regiment of Artillery of the Indian Army.

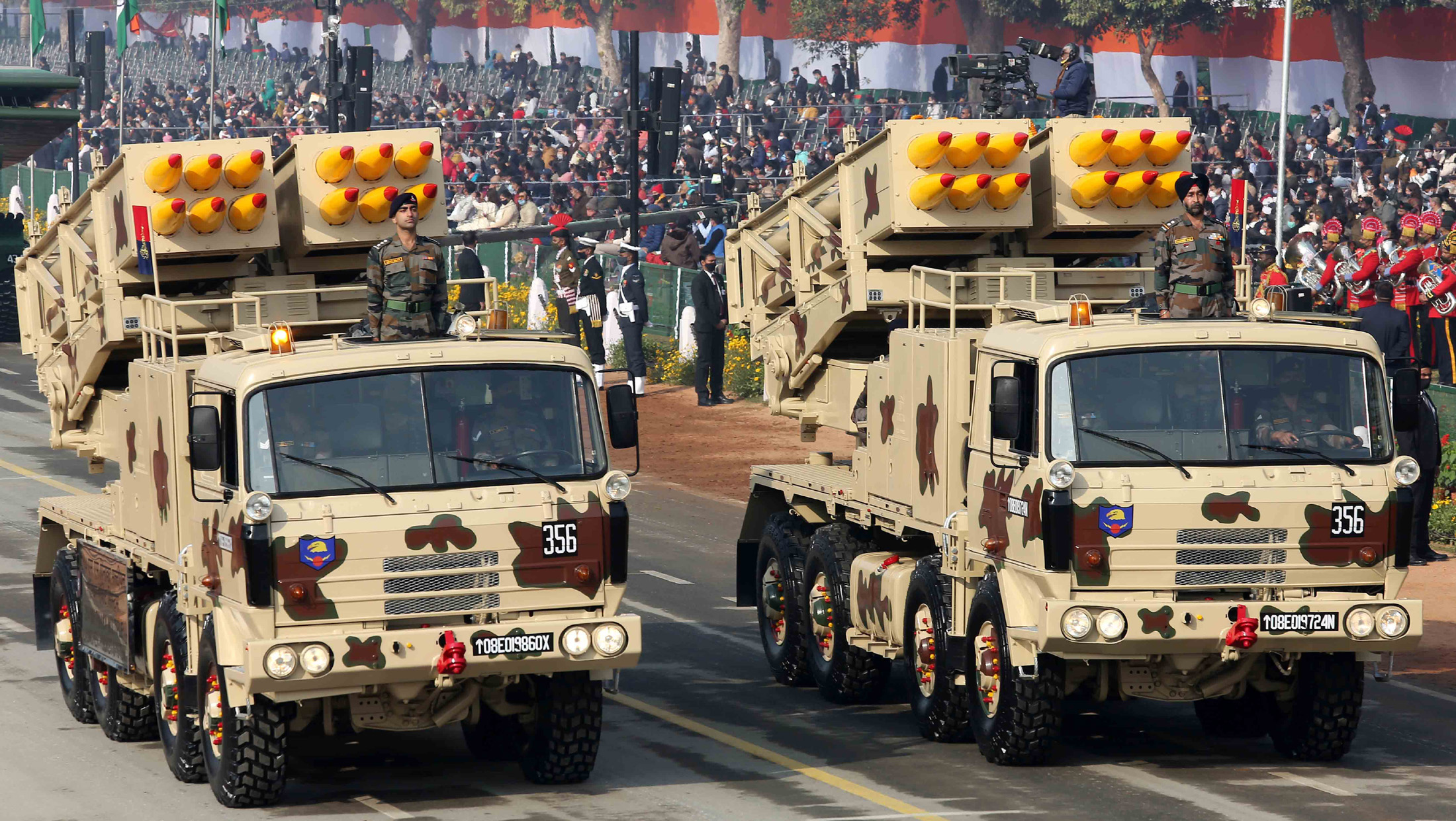
Pinaka Multi Launcher Rocket System of the regiment during the 72nd Republic Day Parade, 2021

== Formation ==
The regiment was raised as 84 Counter Bombardment Regiment in 1963 at Ambala. It was later designated 84 Light Regiment (towed), 841 Light Regiment and converted to a Rocket Regiment in April 2020.

== Class composition ==
The regiment is primarily composed of South Indian troops and they are more commonly known as the ‘Gallant Thambis’.

== Operations ==
The regiment has taken part in the following operations-

- Indo-Pakistani War of 1965 - 84 Light Regiment was part of 4 Mountain Artillery Brigade under 4 Mountain Division and equipped with 120 mm Tampella mortars. It saw action under 6 Mountain Division in the Sialkot sector and in the Battle of Chawinda. It lost 2 officers and 9 other ranks in the war.
- Indo-Pakistani War of 1971 - 84 Light Regiment took part in Operation Cactus Lily and was part of 15 Artillery Brigade under 15 Infantry Division, which was tasked to defend Amritsar sector. It supported the 86 Infantry Brigade during the Dera Baba Nanak operations.
- 841 Light Regiment was deployed along the Line of Control (LoC) in counter cease fire violation operations and fired thousands of mortar bombs against Pakistani troops. The unit was awarded Northern Command Unit Citation for its role.

== Gallantry awards ==
The regiment has won the following gallantry awards–

- Mentioned in dispatches
  - Major Shiv Kumar, Operation Rakshak
- COAS Commendation Cards
  - Naik Chintalakodanda Ramayya
  - Colonel Sawant Aniket Sambhaji

== Achievements ==
- The regiment had the honour to participate in the Republic Day Parade in 2021.

== See also ==
- List of artillery regiments of Indian Army
