= 34th Indian Brigade =

- Active: December 1915 – August 1923
- Country: British India
- Allegiance: British Crown
- Branch: British Indian Army
- Type: Infantry
- Size: Brigade
- Part of: 12th Indian Division; 15th Indian Division; 17th Indian Division
- Engagements: First World War Mesopotamian Campaign Battle of Sharqat

Commanders
- Notable commanders: Br.-Gen. A.G. Wauchope

The 34th Indian Brigade was an infantry brigade of the British Indian Army that saw active service in the Mesopotamian campaign in the Indian Army during the First World War. It was reformed for the Second World War as the 34th Indian States Forces Infantry Brigade.

== History ==
12th Indian Division

The 34th Indian Brigade was formed in Mesopotamia in December 1915 with four battalions newly arrived from India. It joined the 12th Indian Division to replace the 33rd Indian Brigade that was broken up on 7 December. While with the division, it took part in the Affair of Butaniya on 14 January 1916. The division never reached full strength as units were constantly detached to support the efforts to relieve the 6th (Poona) Division besieged at Kut. The division was broken up on 10 March 1916 and the brigade joined Corps Troops before it was posted to the new 15th Indian Division in May 1916.

15th Indian Division

The 15th Indian Division was formed on 7 May 1916 to replace the 12th Indian Division on the Euphrates Front; the brigade joined the division on formation. It remained with the division on the Euphrates Front until August 1917. The only significant action that the brigade took part in as part of the 15th Indian Division was the action of As Sahilan on 11 September 1916.

17th Indian Division

The brigade joined the newly formed 17th Indian Division, swapping places with the 50th Indian Brigade. It remained with the division for the rest of the war, taking part in the action at Fat-ha Gorge on the Little Zab (23–26 October 1918) and the Battle of Sharqat (28–30 October 1918).

At the end of the war, the 17th Division was chosen to form part of the occupation force for Iraq. It took part in the Iraq Rebellion in 1920. In August 1923, the division was reduced to a single brigade; the last British troops left in March 1927 and the Indian ones in November 1928.

== Order of battle ==
The brigade had the following composition in the First World War:

- 1/5th Battalion, Queen's (Royal West Surrey Regiment) (joined from Allahabad Brigade, 8th (Lucknow) Division in December 1915; posted to 12th Indian Brigade in February 1916)
- 31st Punjabis (joined from Fort Sandeman, 4th (Quetta) Division in December 1915; left in September 1918 and joined the 83rd Brigade in the British 28th Division)
- 1st Battalion, 112th Infantry (joined from Dargai, 1st (Peshawar) Division in December 1915)
- 114th Mahrattas (joined from 5th (Jhelum) Brigade, 2nd (Rawalpindi) Division in December 1915)
- half of 2nd Battalion, Queen's Own (Royal West Kent Regiment) (Note: The other half of the 2nd Battalion, Queen's Own (Royal West Kent Regiment) was assigned to the 30th Indian Brigade, 6th (Poona) Division in November 1915. It was captured in the fall of Kut. The battalion was brought up to full strength in June 1916.) (joined from 12th Indian Brigade in January 1916; the battalion was reformed in June 1916)
- 129th Machine Gun Company (joined from Corps Troops in August 1916)
- 34th Light Trench Mortar Battery (joined in February 1918)

== Commanders ==
The brigade had the following commanders:

From	Rank	Name
2 December 1915	Brigadier-General	E.C. Tidswell
1 May 1917	Brigadier-General	A.G. Wauchope

== Bibliography ==
- Kempton, Chris (2003b). 'Loyalty & Honour', The Indian Army September 1939 – August 1947. Vol. Part II Brigades. Milton Keynes: The Military Press. ISBN 0-85420-238-2.
- Perry, F.W. (1993). Order of Battle of Divisions Part 5B. Indian Army Divisions. Newport: Ray Westlake Military Books. ISBN 1-871167-23-X.
