= 11th Rajputs =

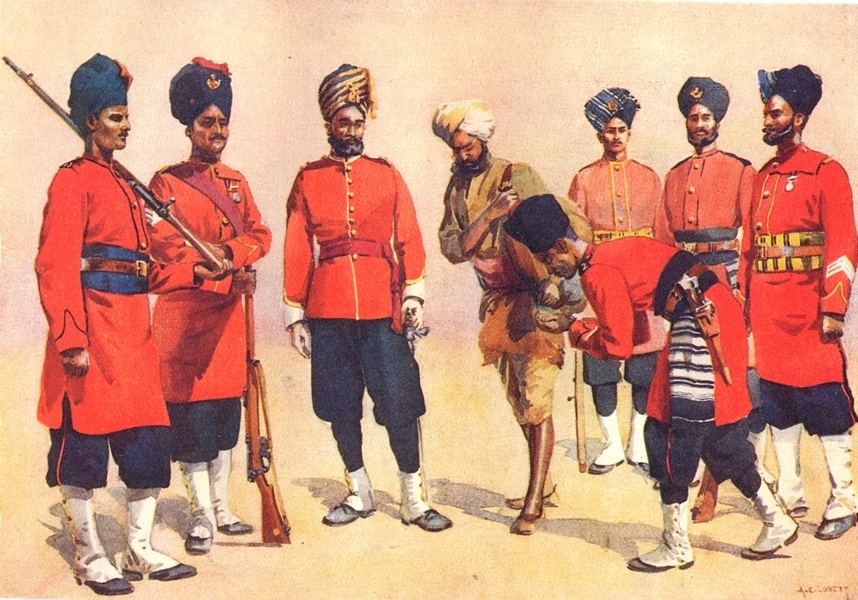
- Soldier of the regiment (second from right) with other British Indian Army Rajput troops
- Active: 1825–1922
- Country: British India
- Branch: British Indian Army
- Type: Infantry
- Part of: Bengal Army (to 1895); Bengal Command
- Uniform: Red; faced yellow
- Engagements: Punjab; Chillianwallah; Goojerat; 1858–1859 China; 1878–1880 Afghanistan; 1885–1887 Burma

Commanders
- Notable commanders: Edward VII (1904) (Colonel-in-Chief)

The 11th Rajputs was an infantry regiment of the Bengal Army and later of the British Indian Army. They could trace their origins to 1825, when they were the 2nd Extra Battalion, Bengal Native Infantry. In 1828, they were renamed the 70th Bengal Native Infantry and a number of changes in name followed - the 11th Bengal Native Infantry 1861–1885, the 11th Bengal Infantry 1885–1897, the 11th (Rajput) Bengal Infantry 1897–1901, the 11th Rajput Infantry 1901–1903. Finally in 1903, after the Kitchener reforms of the Indian Army - the 11th Rajputs.

During this time, the regiment took part in the Second Anglo-Sikh War in the Battle of Chillianwala and the Battle of Goojerat (or Gujrat, Gujerat), the Second Opium War in China, the Third Afghan War, the Third Anglo-Burmese War and World War I. During World War I the regiment was first assigned to the Presidency Brigade, 8th Lucknow Division on internal security duties. They then served in the 33rd Indian Brigade, 12th Indian Division during the Mesopotamia Campaign.

After World War I the Indian government reformed the army again moving from single battalion regiments to multi battalion regiments. The 11th Rajputs now became the 5th Battalion, 7th Rajput Regiment. After independence this was one of the regiments allocated to the new Indian Army.

== Sources ==
- Barthorp, Michael; Burn, Jeffrey (1979). Indian infantry regiments 1860-1914. Osprey Publishing. ISBN 0-85045-307-0.
- Sumner, Ian (2001). The Indian Army 1914-1947. Osprey Publishing. ISBN 1-84176-196-6.
