= Jodhpur Legion =

Regiment of the British Indian Army

The British raised the Jodphur Legion in 1836 at Erinpura Cantonment in the north-east of the Sirohi State, Rajputana 25°9′N 73°4′E, on the left bank of the Jawai River, about 6 miles from Erinpura Road. (Note: Captain Downing, the commandant of the Legion, named the cantonment Erinpura after the island of his birth.)

The Legion consisted of three troops of cavalry and eight companies of infantry, with two 9-pounder guns. The infantry were Poorbias. In 1841 the Legion added three more companies, but these were drawn from the Bhil people.

Each cavalry troop consisted of two native officers, eight non-commissioned officers (NCOs), 72 troopers, and a trumpeter. Each infantry company consisted of two native officers, 12 NCOs, and 80 privates. Each of the Bhil companies consisted of two native officers, 12 NCOs, and 70 men. The two guns were drawn by camels and manned from the infantry. The legion, especially the cavalry portion of it, had a good reputation for efficiency.

The Legion, except for the three Bhil companies, joined the Indian Rebellion of 1857 against the British. (Purbiyas constituted a large part of the Bengal Army and played a major role in the rebellion.)

The Legion mutinied on 23 August 1857.

The three Bhil companies formed the nucleus of the Erinpoorah (or Erinpura) Irregular Force, established in 1860.

== Notes, citations, and references ==
Notes

Citations

References

- Singh, Zabar (1970) "Mutiny of the Jodhpur Legion (1857)", Proceedings of the Indian History Congress, Vol. 32, VOLUME II (1970), pp. 73-78.
- Sheoran, Singh (2019). Gallant Haryana : the first and crucial battlefield of AD 1857. London: Routledge. ISBN 978-0-367-33826-8. OCLC 1105073353.
