= 12th Indian Division =

- Active: 1915–1916
- Country: India
- Allegiance: British Crown
- Branch: British Indian Army
- Type: Infantry
- Size: Division
- Engagements: Battle of Shaiba; Battle of Khafajiya; Battle of Nasiriya

Commanders
- Notable commanders: Major General Gerald Frederick Gorringe

The 12th Indian Division was formed in March 1915 from units of the British Indian Army. It formed part of the Tigris Corps, for service during the Mesopotamia Campaign of World War I. The Division arrived in Mesopotamia in April 1915 and remained there until it was broken up in March 1916. The Division's brigades remained in Mesopotamia as independent formations until forming part of the 15th Indian Division in May 1916. During its short existence it fought in a number of actions including the Battle of Shaiba between 12 and 14 April 1915, the Battle of Khafajiya between 14 and 16 May 1915, the Battle of Nasiriya between 5, 13–14 July 24, 1915, where 400 British and Indian soldiers were killed in the battle and up to 2,000 Turkish Soldiers. The Occupation of Nasiriya and the affair at Butanuja, 14 January 1916.

== Order of battle ==
The division included the following units; not all of them served at the same time:

=== 12th Indian Brigade ===
- 2nd Battalion, Queen's Own (Royal West Kent Regiment)
- 90th Punjabis
- 44th Mherwara Infantry
- 4th Prince Albert Victor's Rajputs
- 67th Punjabis
- 1/5th Battalion, Queen's (Royal West Surrey Regiment)

=== 30th Indian Brigade ===
- 24th Punjabis
- 76th Punjabis
- 126th Baluchis
- 2nd Battalion, 7th Gurkha Rifles
- 1/4th Battalion, Hampshire Regiment
- half of 2nd Battalion, Queen's Own (Royal West Kent Regiment)
- half of 67th Punjabis

=== 33rd Indian Brigade ===
The brigade was broken up in December 1915.

- 1/4th Battalion, Hampshire Regiment
- 11th Rajputs
- 66th Punjabis
- 67th Punjabis
- 4th Prince Albert Victor's Rajputs
- 43rd Erinpura Regiment
- 20th Punjabis

=== 34th Indian Brigade ===
Replaced 33rd Brigade when it was broken up.

- 1/5th Battalion, Queen's (Royal West Surrey Regiment)
- 31st Punjabis
- 1st Battalion, 112th Infantry
- 114th Mahrattas
- half of 2nd Battalion, Queen's Own (Royal West Kent Regiment)

=== Divisional Cavalry ===
- Two squadrons of 33rd Queen Victoria’s Own Light Cavalry

=== Divisional Artillery ===
- 86th Heavy Battery, Royal Garrison Artillery
- 104th Heavy Battery, Royal Garrison Artillery
- 1/5th Hampshire (Howitzer) Battery, Royal Field Artillery (Territorial Force)

=== Divisional Engineers ===
- 12th Field Company, 2nd Sappers and Miners
- 12th Division Signal Company

== See also ==
- List of Indian divisions in World War I

== Bibliography ==
- Haythornthwaite, Philip J. (1996). The World War One Source Book. London: Arms and Armour Press. ISBN 1-85409-351-7.
- Moberly, Frederick James (1927) [1923]. The Campaign in Mesopotamia 1914–1918. History of the Great War Based on Official Documents. Vol. I. London: HMSO. OCLC 772784341.
- Perry, F.W. (1993). Order of Battle of Divisions Part 5B. Indian Army Divisions. Newport: Ray Westlake Military Books. ISBN 1-871167-23-X.
