= 286 Medium Regiment (India) =

- Active: 1985 – present
- Country: India
- Allegiance: India
- Branch: Indian Army
- Type: Artillery
- Size: Regiment
- Nickname(s): Kargil Gunners
- Motto(s): Sarvatra, Izzat-O-Iqbal (Everywhere with Honour and Glory) व्यावसायिकता, पूर्णता और गर्व (Professionalism, Perfection and Pride)
- Colors: Red & Navy Blue
- Equipment: Dhanush 155 mm towed howitzer
- Battle honours: Kargil

Insignia
- Abbreviation: 286 Med Regt

286 Medium Regiment is part of the Regiment of Artillery of the Indian Army.

== Formation and history ==
The regiment was raised in 1985. The unit was subsequently converted to a field regiment and is now a medium regiment. The regiment consists of 2861, 2862 and 2863 medium batteries.

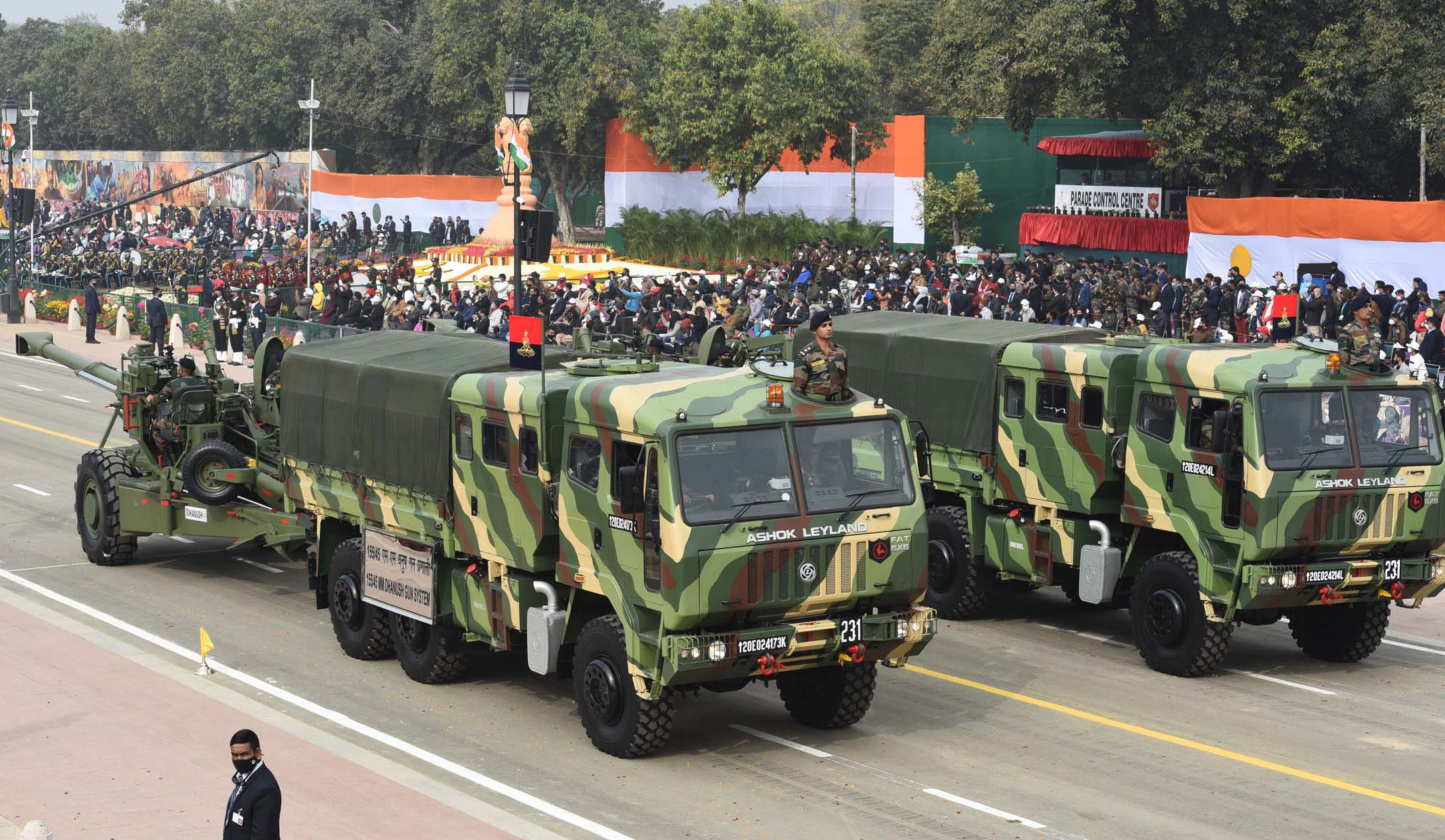
155/45 mm Dhanush Gun System of the regiment during the 73rd Republic Day Celebrations, in New Delhi on January 26, 2022.

== Equipment ==
The regiment has used the following guns-

- 130 mm towed guns
- 122 mm D-30 howitzer
- Dhanush 155 mm towed howitzer

== Operations ==
The regiment has taken part in the following operations–

- Operation Vijay – 286 Medium Regiment was part of the unprecedent artillery bombardment which turned the tide of war. It was in support of 121 (Independent) Infantry Brigade, and was equipped with 130 mm guns. All the barrels of the 18 guns of the regiment wore out their life in 25 days, continuing their assault operation with new gun barrels from the 163 Medium Regiment. The regiment was awarded the honour title Kargil in recognition of its valiant efforts.

== Gallantry awards ==
The regiment has won the following gallantry awards–

- Sena Medals
  - Lieutenant Sanjay Barshilia
  - Gunner Jagdish Prasad Gupta
- Mentioned in dispatches –
  - Captain Karnik Ashish Shrikant
  - Gunner Perminder (posthumous)
  - Gunner Y Dixit (posthumous)

== Motto ==
The motto of the regiment is व्यावसायिकता, पूर्णता और गर्व (Professionalism, Perfection and Pride).

== Other achievements ==
- Havildar Jyothi Shankar D of the regiment represented the Indian Army in the 70th Inter-services athletics championship in 2021–22.

== See also ==
- List of artillery regiments of Indian Army
