= Francis John Fowler =

British officer (1864–1939)

Major-General Francis John Fowler CB DSO
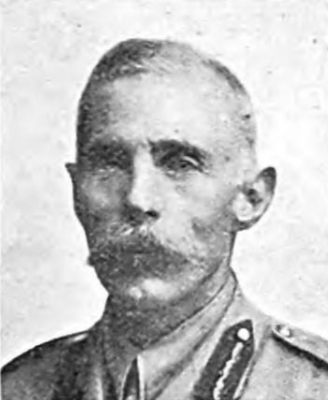
- Born: 31 July 1864; India
- Died: 5 June 1939 (aged 74); Isle of Man
- Military career
- Allegiance: United Kingdom
- Branch: British Army
- Rank: Major-General
- Awards: CB, DSO

Major-General Francis John Fowler CB DSO (31 July 1864 – 5 June 1939) was a British officer who served in the Indian Army from 1885 to 1921. He saw active service in a number of conflicts throughout the British Empire and was the recipient of the Distinguished Service Order and CB.

== Early life and education ==
Fowler was the son of Deputy Surgeon-General H.D. Fowler of the Indian Medical Service, and was born on the 31 July 1864 at Mian Mir, India. He was educated at King William's College (Isle of Man), Bedford Modern School and Sandhurst.

== Military career ==
He joined the Army as a lieutenant in the 1st Battalion, Loyal North Lancashire Regiment in August 1883, and when his regiment was posted to India he participated in the punitive raids conducted under the command of Brigadier-General Sir Oriel Tanner against the hostile tribes of the Zhob Valley situated in modern Pakistan during late 1884.

In November 1885 he transferred as a lieutenant to the Bombay Staff Corps but dating back to August 1883, when he was initially commissioned, and joined the 1st Baluch Battalion of Light Infantry based at Quetta. In 1887-88 he was in Burma and was decorated for his role in the defeat and capture of the Burmese rebel leader Twek-nga-lu in May 1888. According to the St. James Gazette, Fowler along with Corporal Scott, Assistant Superintendent of the Shan States, and six men of the Rifle Brigade broke away from the main body of British troops commanded by Colonel G. Sartorius and mounted a horseback charge on Twek-nga-lu's palace in the town of Mone. They surprised the town's 400 strong garrison and, after overcoming Twek's 20 man personal bodyguard, tied him to his bedpost and accepted his surrender. For this Fowler was awarded the DSO, Mentioned in Despatches. and received the India General Service 1854-95 with Burma 1887-89 clasp.

In 1897–1898 he saw action at the Battle of Jeruba in Uganda and was again Mentioned in Despatches and was the recipient of the East and Central Africa Medal with two clasps. From there he served in China in 1900–1901 (recipient of the China 1900 Medal) and was promoted to major. In 1907 he was again promoted to lieutenant-colonel and commanded troops in Somaliland between 1908 and 1910 (recipient of Africa General Service Medal 1902-56 with Somaliland 1908-10 Clasp), after which he was promoted to full colonel in May 1911. In 1913 he was Assistant Quarter-Master General, India.

After the outbreak of the First World War he succeeded Major-General George Younghusband as commander of the Derajat Brigade and was made temporary brigadier-general. In January 1916 he was awarded the C.B. and the following month he joined the Mesopotamian Expeditionary Force. Injuries he sustained during fighting in March 1916 caused him to be invalided from active service and thereafter he became Divisional Area Commander at Poona and Karachi before being appointed to command a brigade with the temporary rank of brigadier general in July 1917.

He retired from the army as major general in January 1921.

== Personal life ==
He settled on the Isle of Man and became a Justice of the Peace on the island. In 1896 he had married May Sartorius, the daughter of his commanding officer in Burma. Major-General Francis John Fowler CB DSO died on 5 June 1939.
