= 163 Medium Regiment (India) =

Regiment in India

- Active: 1963 till date
- Country: India
- Allegiance: India
- Branch: Indian Army
- Nickname: The History Creators
- Mottos: Sarvatra Izzat-O-Iqbal (Everywhere with Honour & Glory); Vinay Aur Veerta (Courtesy & Valour)
- Colors: Red & Navy Blue
- Anniversaries: 1 October (Raising Day)
- Engagements: 1965 Indo-Pak War; 1971 Indo-Pak War; Op Rakshak; Kargil war Op Parakram
- Decorations: GOC-in-C Northern Command Unit Citation, January 2025

Insignia
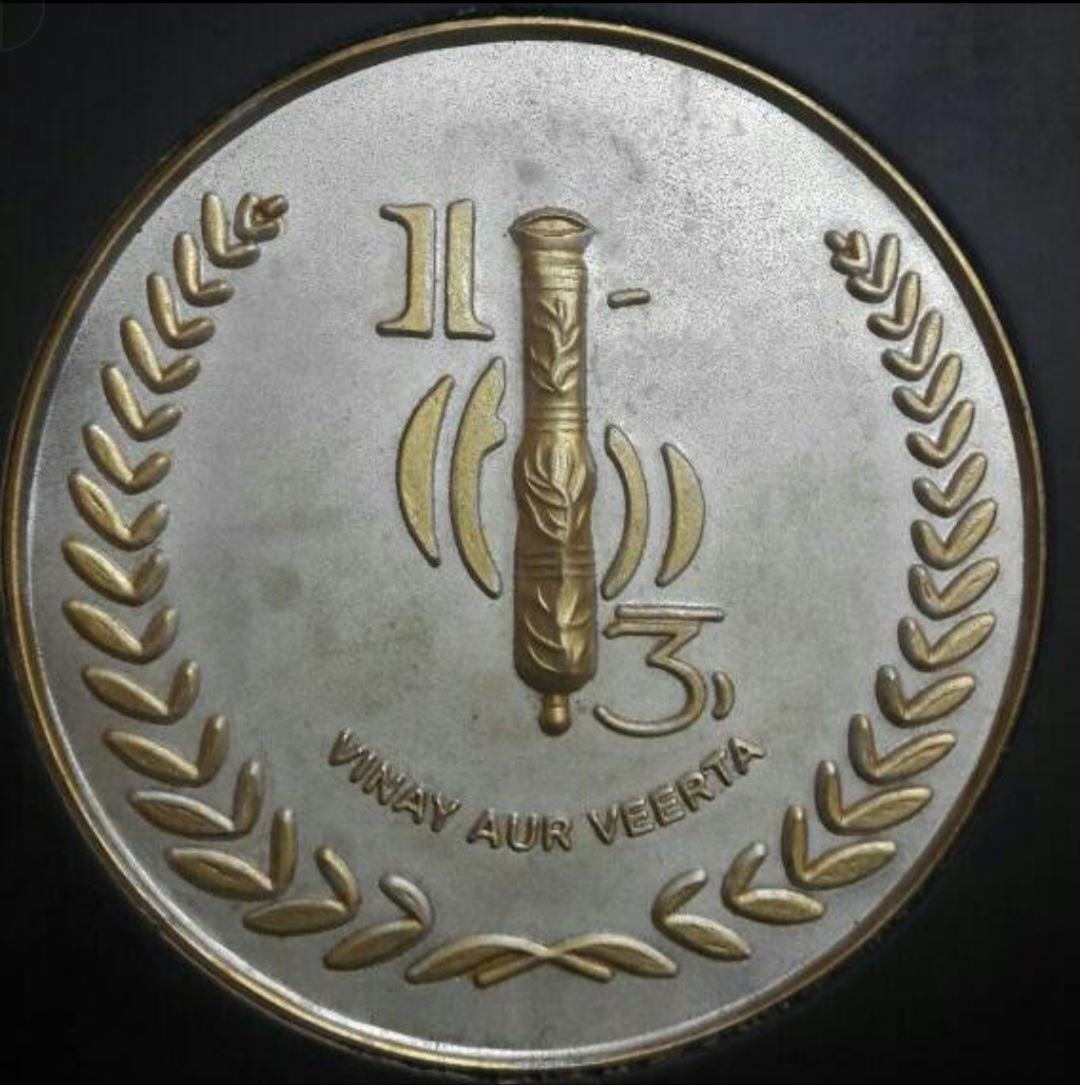
- Identification symbol: Regimental logo

163 Medium Regiment is part of the Regiment of Artillery of the Indian Army.

== Formation and History ==
The regiment was raised as 163 Field Regiment on 1 October 1963 at Jalandhar. The first Commanding Officer was Lieutenant Colonel Milkha Singh Mann. The regiment was constituted from the Sierra Batteries of 4 Field Regiment, 41 Field Regiment and 81 Field Regiment. Since raising, the regiment had a 'Fixed Class' composition with a Battery each of Rajputs, Sikhs and Ahirs. The regiment was converted for the first time from 163 Field Regiment to 163 Medium Regiment on 18 September 1992, back to field regiment on 8 July 2008 and is presently back as a medium regiment. The regiment was converted to a 'Mixed Class (All India)' composition in May 1999. The unit presently consists of 1631, 1632 and 1633 medium batteries.

== Operations ==
The regiment has taken part in the following operations –

- Indo-Pak War of 1965. The newly raised regiment took part in 'Operation Riddle' and 'Operation Ablaze' in the Rajouri sector of Jammu and Kashmir in 25 Infantry Division Area under 15 Corps. During the operations in the Kalidhar Range, on 14 October 1965, within barely two years of the regiment's raising, it lost one of its Battery Commander Major J Pratap during the operations. Despite this setback, on the very same day, the area was captured by the Indian forces with decisive artillery firepower delivered by 163 Field Regiment. During the war, Lance Naik Harjinder Singh and Gunner Bhoor Singh of this regiment were also killed.
- Indo-Pak War of 1971. The regiment took part in 'Operation Cactus Lily' in the Ajnala sector on the Western front. It was on ORBAT of 15 Artillery Brigade under 15 Infantry Division. Gunner Gundhari Singh Kaurav and Gunner Rambir Singh were killed during the war.
- Operation Rakshak - The regiment took part in counter-terrorism operations in Jammu and Kashmir between October 1989 and September 1992. Subsequently, the regiment took part in 'Operation Kasba' in the Poonch sector.
- Operation Vijay - The regiment actively participated in the 'Kargil War' and for the first time in history moved the 130 mm M-46 artillery guns from Zoji La to Kargil under heavy enemy shelling on 7 June 1999, thus replenishing the firepower by replacing the guns of 286 Medium Regiment, which had outlived their barrel life.
- Operation Parakram - During its tenure in Kupwara sector, for counter-terrorism operations, the regiment took part in 'Operation Parakram' and 'Operation Vajra Prahar'. It was actively involved in firing at enemy gun positions during the operations.

== Military decorations and awards ==
The regiment was awarded the 'GOC-in-C Northern Command Unit Citation' in January 2025.

Personnel from the unit have won the following gallantry awards -

- Vir Chakra - 2
  - Major J Pratap, 1965, (Posthumous).
  - Major Harish Kumar Chopra, 1971.
- Param Vishisht Seva Medal - 1
  - Lieutenant General Vijay Kumar Ahluwalia.
- Ati Vishisht Seva Medal - 2
  - Lieutenant General Vijay Kumar Ahluwalia, Bar.
- Yudh Seva Medal - 1
  - Brigadier (later Lieutenant General) Vijay Kumar Ahluwalia.
- Vishisht Seva Medal - 2
  - Brigadier SK Pasricha, 1982.
  - Lieutenant Colonel (later Lieutenant General) Vijay Kumar Ahluwalia.
- Chief of Army Staff Commendation Cards - 6
  - Major G Srinivas, 2002.
  - Subedar (TA) Wirsa Singh, 2006.
  - Gunner Jaswir Singh, 2006.
  - Lieutenant Colonel G Srinivas, 2008.
  - Lieutenant Colonel Diler Singh Jakhar, 2017.
  - Naik Mahender Singh, 2024.
- Vice Chief of Army Staff Commendation Cards - 1
  - Subedar Major Balkar Singh, 2009.
- General Officer Commanding-in-Chief Commendation Cards - 26
  - Havildar Nirmal Singh, 1999.
  - Gunner Shrikant Yadav, 2006.
  - Gunner Sunil Rajput, 2007.
  - Colonel Amit Kumar Jha, 2025.
  - Major Desmond Cyril, 2025.

== Notable officers ==
- Lieutenant General Vijay Kumar Ahluwalia PVSM, AVSM & Bar, YSM, VSM, GOC-in-C Central Command from 2010 to 2012.

== See also ==
- List of artillery regiments of Indian Army
