= 19th Hyderabad Regiment =

- Active: 1922–1948
- Country: British India; Hyderabad State
- Branch: British Indian Army; Hyderabad State Forces
- Type: Infantry
- Engagements: World War II

The 19th Hyderabad Regiment was an infantry regiment of the British Indian Army. It was formed at the time of reforms of the Indian Army after the First World War, when it moved from single-battalion regiments to multi-battalion regiments. The regiment saw service during the Second World War, and after Operation Polo was incorporated into the Indian Army as the Kumaon Regiment.

== Second World War ==
The 19th Hyderabad Regiment in 1939, consisted of four regular battalions; the 1st (Russell's), 2nd (Berar), 4th (composed of Ahirs) and The Kumaon Rifles. The 19th expanded during the war adding another eight battalions to the 19th Hyderabad Regiment. Two more battalions from Hyderabad, (not to be mistaken with the 19th Hyderabads) the 1st and 2nd Hyderabad Infantry were raised as part of the Indian State Forces. The battalions of the 19th Hyderabad Regiment fought in the Middle East, North Africa, Persia, Malaya, Singapore and Burma.

The Kumaon Rifles were based in Hong Kong at the beginning of the War but were transferred to the Middle East as part of the 24th Indian Infantry Brigade. The battalion took part in the Anglo-Soviet invasion of Iran in 1941 under Major-General William Slim. They remained in Persia as part of the garrison throughout the rest of the war.

The 4th Battalion was part of the 12th Indian Infantry Brigade based in Malaya when the Japanese Army invaded in December 1941. The 4/19th Hyderabads were one of the few battalions in Malaya that were relatively well trained in jungle warfare. Although the battalion performed well in the fighting retreat in north-west Malaya, they were practically annihilated at the disastrous Battle of Slim River on 7 January 1942. The few survivors of the 4th Battalion were withdrawn to Singapore where they took part in the brief defence of the island before it surrendered on 15 February 1942.

In 1948, after Operation Polo, the regiment was incorporated into the Indian Army as the Kumaon Regiment.

== Formation ==
- 1st Battalion ex 94th Russell's Infantry
- 2nd Battalion ex 96th Berar Infantry
- 3rd Battalion ex 97th Deccan Infantry (Disbanded 1931)
- 4th Battalion ex 98th Infantry
- 5th Battalion ex 99th Deccan Infantry (Disbanded 1924, re-raised 1940)
- 10th (Training) Battalion ex 95th Russell's Infantry
- In 1923 the 1/50th Kumaon Rifles joined the 19th Hyderabad Regiment as the 1st Kumaon Rifles.
