= 15th Infantry Division (India) =

15th Indian Division
- Active: 7 May 1916 – March 1919; 1 October 1964 – present
- Country: British India; India
- Branch: British Indian Army; Indian Army
- Type: Infantry
- Size: Division
- Nickname: Panther Division
- Engagements: World War I Mesopotamian campaign Capture of Ramadi Action of Khan Baghdadi Indo-Pakistani War of 1965 Indo-Pakistani War of 1971

Commanders
- Notable commanders: Major General H T Brooking; Major General Mohinder Singh MVC; Major General BM Bhattacharjee PVSM, MVC

The 15th Indian Division was an infantry division of the British Indian Army that saw active service in the First World War. It served in the Mesopotamian campaign on the Euphrates Front throughout its existence. It did not serve in the Second World War, but was reformed at Dehradun in 1964 as part of the post-independence Indian Army.

== History ==
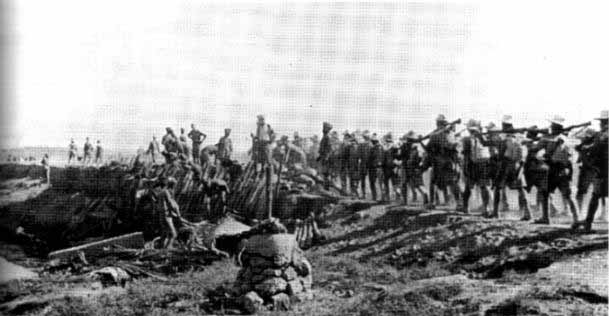
The 2nd Battalion, 6th Gurkha Rifles of 42nd Indian Brigade march towards the action of Khan Baghdadi

World War I

The division was formed on 7 May 1916 to replace the 12th Indian Division on the Euphrates Front. It remained on the Euphrates Front until the end of the war. It took part in the action of As Sahilan (11 September 1916), the Capture of Ramadi (28 and 29 September 1917), the Occupation of Hīt (9 March 1918) and the action of Khan Baghdadi (26 and 27 March 1918). The division was not attached to either of the army corps operating in Mesopotamia, the I Corps and III Corps.

The division was commanded from formation on 7 May 1916 by Brigadier-General Harry T Brooking. Brooking was promoted to Major-General on 5 June 1916.

At the end of the war, the division was rapidly run down and it was disbanded in March 1919.

Post Independence

The division was re-raised on 1 October 1964 at Clement Town, Dehradun under Major General Niranjan Prasad and assigned to XI Corps. The divisional headquarters has been located at Amritsar since 1965.

== Order of battle, First World War ==
The division commanded the following units, although not all of them served at the same time:

=== 12th Indian Brigade ===
- 1/5th Battalion, Queen's (Royal West Surrey Regiment)
- 2nd Battalion, 39th Garhwal Rifles
- 1st Battalion, 43rd Erinpura Infantry
- 90th Punjabis
- 128th Machine Gun Company
- 12th Light Trench Mortar Battery

=== 34th Indian Brigade ===
Joined the division on formation and left for the 17th Indian Division in August 1917

- 2nd Battalion, Queen's Own (Royal West Kent Regiment)
- 31st Punjabis
- 1st Battalion, 112th Infantry
- 114th Mahrattas
- 129th Machine Gun Company

=== 42nd Indian Brigade ===
- 1/4th Battalion, Devonshire Regiment
- 1/4th Battalion, Dorsetshire Regiment
- 1st Battalion, 5th Gurkha Rifles (Frontier Force)
- 2nd Battalion, 5th Gurkha Rifles (Frontier Force)
- 2nd Battalion, 6th Gurkha Rifles
- 130th Machine Gun Company
- 42nd Light Trench Mortar Battery

=== 50th Indian Brigade ===
Joined from the 17th Indian Division in September 1917

- 1st Battalion, Oxfordshire and Buckinghamshire Light Infantry
- 6th Jat Light Infantry
- 14th King George's Own Ferozepore Sikhs
- 24th Punjabis
- 1st Battalion, 97th Deccan Infantry
- 256th Machine Gun Company
- 50th Light Trench Mortar Battery

=== Divisional Artillery ===
- VII Mountain Brigade, Indian Mountain Artillery (21st Kohat and 26th Jacob's Mountain Batteries) (Note: VII Mountain Brigade, Indian Mountain Artillery joined in May 1916 and left in April 1917.)
- CCXXII Brigade, Royal Field Artillery (375th, 1070th, 1072th, 77th (H) and 429th (H) Batteries) (Note: CCXXII Brigade, Royal Field Artillery joined in October 1916. It was originally the III Home Counties Brigade of the Home Counties Division, Territorial Force, plus the 375th and 77th (H) Batteries. 429th (H) Battery replaced 77th (H) Battery in October 1918.)
- CCXV Brigade, Royal Field Artillery (816th, 1087th, 1088th and 524th (H) Batteries} (Note: CCXV Brigade, Royal Field Artillery joined in October 1917 from 3rd (Lahore) Division. It was originally the I Wessex Brigade of the Wessex Division, Territorial Force, plus the 816th and 524th (H) Batteries. 816th Battery was originally 2/1st Nottinghamshire Royal Horse Artillery.)
- Volunteer Battery (Note: The Volunteer Battery left in April 1918 for 17th Indian Division.)
- M, N and O Light Trench Mortar Batteries (Note: M, N and O Light Trench Mortar Batteries joined in September 1917 and were assigned to the infantry brigades in February 1918.)
- X.15 Medium Trench Mortar Battery
- 15th Divisional Ammunition Column

=== Engineers and Pioneers ===
- 4th Field Company, 1st King George's Own Sappers and Miners
- Malerkotla Sappers and Miners, ISF
- 448th (Northumbrian) Field Company, Royal Engineers
- 450th (Northumbrian) Field Company, Royal Engineers
- 451st (Northumbrian) Field Company, Royal Engineers
- 15th Division Signal Company, Royal Engineers Signal Service
- 48th Pioneers

=== Divisional troops ===
- D Squadron 1/1st Hertfordshire Yeomanry (6 August 1917 to May 1918)
- 275th Machine Gun Company
- 3rd, 19th, 23rd, 24th, 34th, 105th and 108th Combined Field Ambulances, RAMC
- No. 16 (renumbered No. 6) Mobile Veterinary Section, AVC
- 15th Division Train, ASC

== Battles and engagements during World War I ==
The division was involved in the following actions:

- Action of As Sahilan (11 September 1916)
- Capture of Ramadi (28 – 29 September 1917)
- Occupation of Hīt (9 March 1918)
- Action of Khan Baghdadi (26 – 27 March 1918)

== Indo-Pakistani War of 1965 ==
The division was fully operational on 31 March 1965 and moved to its headquarters in Amritsar by 1 April 1965. It took part in Operation Ablaze and the Battle of Dograi.

The division consisted of 38 Infantry Brigade, 54 Infantry Brigade and 15 Artillery Brigade. 38 Infantry Brigade consisted of 1 Jat, 1/3 Gorkha Rifles and 3 Garhwal Rifles. 54 Infantry Brigade consisted of 3 Jat, 15 Dogra, 13 Punjab. In addition to the two infantry brigades, the division consisted of 14 Horse (Scinde Horse), 60 Heavy Regiment and 71 Field Company. 96 Infantry Brigade, consisting of 6 Kumaon, 7 Punjab and 16 Dogra was initially part of the XI Corps reserve, but subsequently placed under the division's operational command. 50 (Independent) Parachute Brigade was placed under the division on 11 September. It was tasked to capture the road and rail bridges in Jallo area, but suffered heavy casualties during 16 and 17 September and had to be withdrawn.

The division was given the task to advance on the Grand Trunk Road axis and capture the bridge on the Bambawali-Ravi-Bedian Canal (also called Ichhogil Canal) in Dograi east of Lahore. 3 Jat under Lieutenant Colonel Desmond Hayde captured Dograi on the eastern bank of the Canal on 6 September 1965. The same day, 3 Jat captured the Batapore and Attokeawan localities on the west bank of the Canal. Due to lack of support, the unit had to fall back. 1 Jat managed to reach Bhaini Dhilwan bridge, but could not secure it due to armour and artillery fire and had to withdraw. This bridge was subsequently captured by 96 Infantry Brigade. Following the initial reverses faced by the division, Major General Niranjan Prasad was replaced by Major General Mohindar Singh on 9 September 1965. The period of 11 to 18 September was characterised by a series of unproductive actions. The division subsequently plunged in the battle for the Ichhogil canal with zeal and determination. On 21 and 22 September, 3 Jat of the 54 Brigade captured Dograi. The unit won 3 Maha Vir Chakras, 4 Vir Chakras, 7 Sena Medals, 12 Mention in Dispatches and 11 COAS Commendation Cards.

At the end of the war, 15 Division saw 486 killed (26 Officers, 9 JCOs, 451 ORs), 1569 wounded (60 Officers, 57 JCOs, 1450 ORs, 2 NCEs) and 85 missing (3 Officers, 2 JCOs, 79 ORs, 1 NCE).

=== Awards and honours ===
- The following regiments won the battle honour Dograi-
  - 14 Horse
  - 3 Jat
  - 15 Dogra
  - 7 Punjab
  - 13 Punjab
- During the campaign, four Maha Vir Chakras were awarded for conspicuous bravery-
  - Major General Mohinder Singh, GOC 15 Infantry Division
  - Lieutenant Colonel Desmond E Hayde, Commanding Officer, 3 Jat
  - Major AR Tyagi (Posthumous), 3 Jat
  - Captain Kapil Singh Thapa (Posthumous), 3 Jat

== Indo-Pakistani War of 1971 ==
The division was under Major General BM Bhattacharjee MVC during the 1971 war and was responsible for the area between Gurdaspur and the Grand Trunk road opposite Amritsar. It took part in the battles of Dera Baba Nanak and Fatehpur – Burj.

=== Order of battle ===
- 66 Armoured Regiment
- 86 Infantry Brigade
  - 71 Armoured Regiment (from 14 (Independent) Armoured Brigade)
  - 10 Dogra
  - 1/9 Gorkha Rifles
  - 4/8 Gorkha Rifles
  - 17 Rajput
  - 21 BSF
- 58 Infantry Brigade (detached from 14 Infantry Division)
  - 24 Punjab
- 96 Infantry Brigade
  - 15 Maratha Light Infantry
  - 8 Sikh Light Infantry
- 54 Infantry Brigade
  - 2 Sikh
  - 9 Punjab
  - 11 Grenadiers
  - 23 BSF
  - 27 BSF
- 38 Infantry Brigade
  - 16 Grenadiers
  - 4 Assam
  - 8 Garhwal Rifles
- 15 Artillery Brigade
  - 42 Field Regiment
  - 175 Field Regiment
  - 177 Field Regiment
  - 74 Medium Regiment
  - 84 Light Regiment
  - 202 Divisional Locating Battery
- Additional Artillery Regiments
  - 163 Field Regiment
  - 71 Medium Regiment
  - 49 AD Regiment (two troops)
  - 3 Air Observation Post Flight
  - 20 Locating Regiment

=== Awards and honours ===
15 Infantry Division won numerous gallantry awards during the war. Prominent among them are:

Param Vishisht Seva Medal awardee-

- Major General BM Bhattacharjee MVC

Maha Vir Chakra awardees-

- Battle of Dera Baba Nanak
  - Brigadier Krishnaswamy Gowri Shankar, Commander of 86 Infantry Brigade
  - Lieutenant Colonel Narinder Singh Sandhu of 10 Dogra
  - Captain Devinder Singh Ahlawat of 10 Dogra
- Battle of Burj
  - Sepoy Pandurang Salunkhe of 15 Maratha Light Infantry
- Ranian
  - Major Basidev Singh Makotia of 9 Punjab
- Fathepur
  - Lieutenant Colonel Harish Chandra Pathak of 8 Sikh Light Infantry
- Pul Kanjiri
  - Lance Naik Shangara Singh of 2 Sikh

Battle Honours

- 86 Infantry Brigade was awarded the battle honour Dera Baba Nanak.
- 15 Maratha Light Infantry was awarded the battle honour Burj and the theatre honour Punjab. It was declared as the 'Best Performing Battalion' during the 1971 Indo-Pak War in the XI Corps Zone by the GOC, Lieutenant General N. C. Rawlley PVSM, AVSM, MC.
- 10 Dogra was awarded the battle honour Dera Baba Nanak.
- 1/9 Gorkha Rifles was awarded the battle honour Dera Baba Nanak and theatre honour Punjab.

== Other Operations ==
- Operation Blue Star
- Operation Vijay
- Operation Parakram

== See also ==
- List of Indian divisions in World War I

== Bibliography ==
- Kempton, Chris (2003a). 'Loyalty & Honour', The Indian Army September 1939 – August 1947. Vol. Part I Divisions. Milton Keynes: The Military Press. ISBN 0-85420-228-5.
- Moberly, Frederick James (1927) [1923]. The Campaign in Mesopotamia 1914–1918. History of the Great War Based on Official Documents. Vol. I. London: HMSO. OCLC 772784341.
- Perry, F.W. (1993). Order of Battle of Divisions Part 5B. Indian Army Divisions. Newport: Ray Westlake Military Books. ISBN 1-871167-23-X.
