= Harry Triscott Brooking =

Brooking in 1919.

Major-General Sir Harry Triscott Brooking, KCB, KCSI, KCMG (13 January 1864 – 17 January 1944) was a British Indian Army officer. He is best remembered for his victories at Ramadi in 1917 and at Khan Baghdadi in 1918 during the First World War, which have been described as "among the most perfectly conceived and conducted minor battles of the whole war".

== Life and career ==
The son of an Indian Army officer, Brooking was educated at Wellington College and the Royal Military College, Sandhurst. He was commissioned into the South Wales Borderers in 1884, before transferring to the Indian Army the following year.

In January 1911 he was promoted to colonel. and in October took over the position of GSO1 of the 5th Indian Division from Colonel Arthur Lowry Cole. In January 1914 he was made a CB in the 1914 New Year Honours.

During the First World War, which began in the summer of 1914, he briefly commanded the 33rd Indian Brigade and later the 12th Indian Brigade from 20 September 1915 to 7 May 1916 and the 15th Indian Division from 7 May 1916 until the end of the war. His rank of major general became substantive on 1 January 1917.
