= Battles of Ramadi (1917) =

WWI battle in Iraq

The two Battles of Ramadi were fought between the forces of the British and Ottoman Empires in July and September 1917 during World War I. The two sides contested the town of Ramadi in central Iraq, about 100 km (62 miles) west of Baghdad on the south bank of the Euphrates River, where an important Ottoman garrison was quartered. The town's strategic position on the road between Aleppo and Baghdad made it a key British target during the Mesopotamian campaign, but the hostile climatic conditions meant that it took two attacks over the course of three months for the town to fall.

The first battle in July 1917 resulted in a British defeat. This was caused by a combination of factors, including extreme heat that caused more casualties than enemy fire, bad weather, faulty British communications, and an effective Turkish defence. The lessons learned were utilised in the second battle two months later: the British adopted different tactics and trapped the garrison against the Euphrates, cutting off their lines of escape. It was consequently captured almost in its entirety with large amounts of ammunition and supplies.

== First Battle of Ramadi ==
First Battle of Ramadi
- Part of the Mesopotamian campaign of World War I
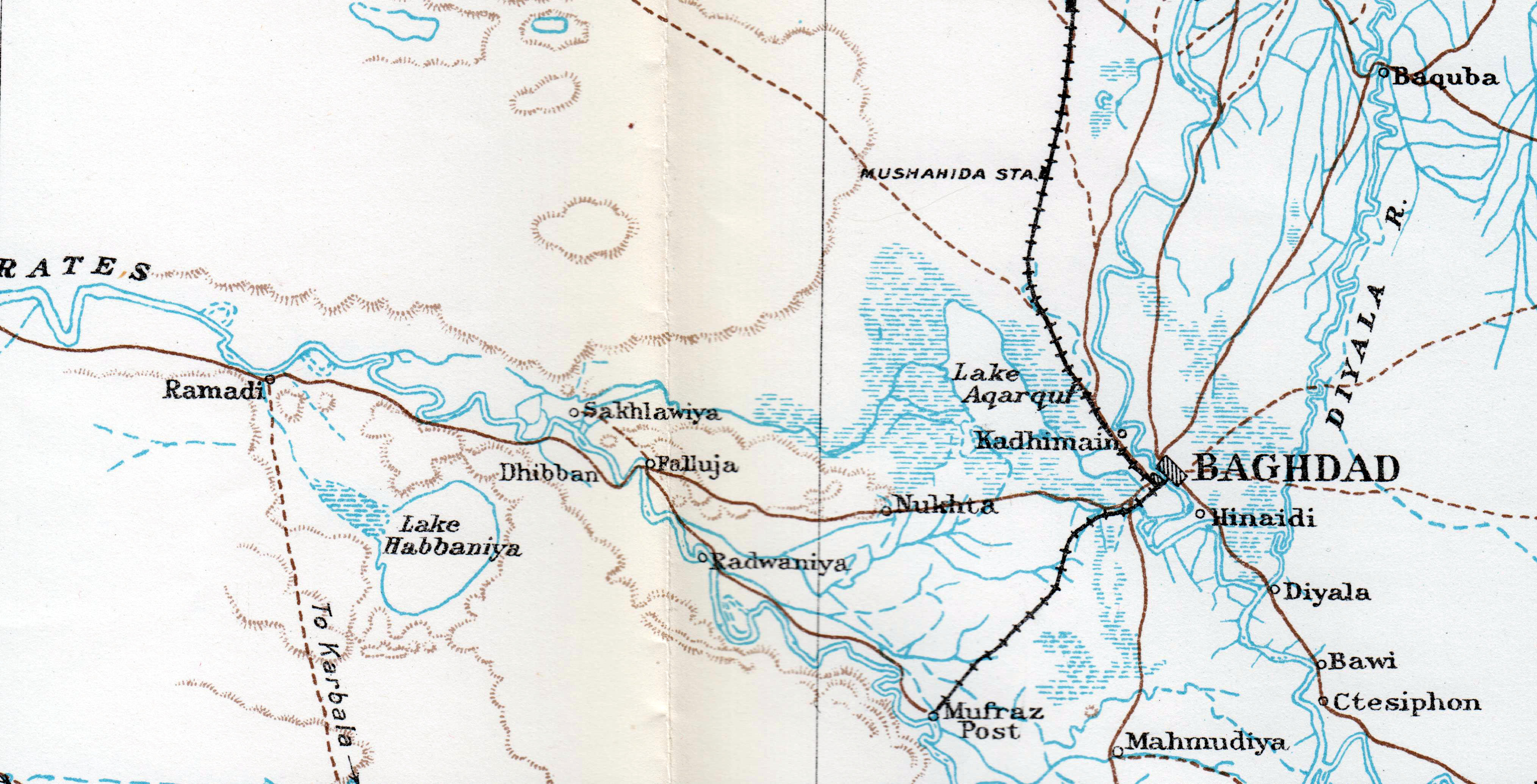
- Map of the Euphrates from Ramadi to Baghdad in 1917
Date	8–13 July 1917 (5 days)
Location	Ramadi, Ottoman Iraq 33°25′N 43°18′E
Result	Ottoman victory

Belligerents
British Empire: India; United Kingdom	Ottoman Empire

Commanders and leaders
(United Kingdom of Great Britain and Ireland) Charles Levenax Haldane	(Ottoman Empire) Ismet Pasha

Strength
7th Infantry Brigade	1,000

Casualties and losses
566 (321 heatstroke)	c. 250 plus c. 100 desertions

=== Background ===
In March 1917, the Ottoman Turks under Halil Pasha were driven out of Fallujah by the British and fell back to positions on the Madhij Defile, 29 km (18 miles) to the west. On their retreat they managed to breach the Sakhlawiya Dam on the Euphrates, significantly increasing the risk of flooding downriver. Although this had some tactical advantages for the British in that floodwaters would make the area west of Baghdad impassable, it also carried with it the risk – which was deemed unacceptable – that the Samarra and Musaiyib railways would be threatened and Fallujah cut off.

The British therefore sought to reconstruct the dam. This required the occupation of Dhibban, a village about 32 km (20 miles) south of Ramadi, in order to guard the working parties on the dam. General Frederick Stanley Maude decided that an operation should be mounted to occupy Dhibban and strike against the Turkish garrison at Ramadi, which was said to number "about 120 sabres, 700 rifles and 6 [artillery] guns" – in total about 1,000 men. Maude did not aim to occupy Ramadi but to drive out its garrison and capture as many prisoners and as much materiel as possible.

Unexpectedly, however, the temperatures began to soar a few days after Maude issued his orders. By 8 July the temperature had reached over 50 °C (123 °F) in the shade in Baghdad and was several degrees higher in tents and dug-outs. The temperature in the direct sun was measured at 71 °C (160 °F). One observer noted that the Baghdadis called it "the hottest season in the memory of man" and commented that the extreme heat made most things too hot even to touch: "The rim of a tumbler burnt one's hand in a tent. The dust and sand burn the soles of one's feet through one's boots."

Maude considered postponing the operation but was advised by General Alexander Cobbe to go ahead on the grounds that the weather was unlikely to get cooler and that all possible precautions were being taken to minimise the impact of the heat. A column was assembled at Fallujah consisting of the 7th (Ferozepore) Brigade, two cavalry squadrons, fourteen artillery pieces, four armoured cars and half a sapper and miner company. Three aircraft were also designated to support the force, which was led by Lt Col Charles Levenax Haldane.

The biggest challenge facing the British was how to get the force to Ramadi, as the heat made it impossible to march there from Dhibban, even at night. It was decided to transport them in motor vehicles, ferrying them up to their attacking positions and hopefully delivering them in a fresh enough state to mount an attack. This marked the first serious effort to use motorised infantry in the Mesopotamian theatre. 127 Ford vans and lorries were employed to transport the men, 600 at a time, travelling by night and with tents to shelter against the sun during the daytime. Ice would also be carried to ensure that any cases of heatstroke could be treated immediately.

=== Course of the battle ===
Dhibban was occupied without a fight on the night of 7/8 July and the rest of the force arrived there from Falluja on 10 July. A small detachment remained behind to guard Dhibban while the rest pressed on to the Madhij Defile, 11 km (7 miles) to the west. They reached it in the late evening and occupied it without opposition, though Turkish rifle fire was encountered soon afterwards. At 01:00 on 11 July, the advance resumed to Mushaid Point, about 3.2 km (2 miles) east of Ramadi. The column did not reach it until 04:45 due to heavy sand along the route. As the force moved through gardens and farms on the outskirts of Ramadi, the Turks opened fire with six artillery guns, two machine guns, and numerous rifles. By this time, two of the three British aircraft had been forced down after they developed mechanical problems, due to the heat evaporating the water from their radiators. The armoured cars and infantry could make no progress in the face of artillery and machine-gun fire. The Turkish artillery proved far more accurate than expected, repeatedly disabling the British wireless communications. Reinforcements were sent up at 06:45 but could make no further progress.

To make matters worse a dust storm began at 08:00 and continued for most of the rest of the day. British communications broke down and the storm prevented effective counter-battery fire. This in turn made it impossible for the British infantry to attack, as they faced an advance across nearly 1 km (1,000 yards) of open ground in searing heat. The heat also made it impossible to organise a withdrawal during the daytime, so the troops dug in and endured the conditions with water being supplied from the Euphrates. Suggestions that the Turks might be about to withdraw came to nothing and, at 03:15 the following day, the British commander decided to withdraw under the cover of darkness. Although the Turks did not attack the withdrawing British, around 1,500 pro-Turkish Arabs mounted an attack but were "beaten off and severely punished as soon as it got light." They continued to mount sniping attacks against the British as they made their way back to Dhibban, which they reached at 21:30 on 13 July.

=== Casualties and aftermath ===
The battle had been a costly failure, exacerbated by the severe weather conditions and the unexpectedly strong Turkish resistance. The British suffered 566 casualties, of whom 321 – over half – were caused by the heat. Enemy fire thus accounted for less than half of the British casualties. Some men died of heat stroke, while others were reported to have died of thirst or gone mad.

== Second Battle of Ramadi ==
=== Background ===
Second Battle of Ramadi
- Part of the Mesopotamian campaign of World War I
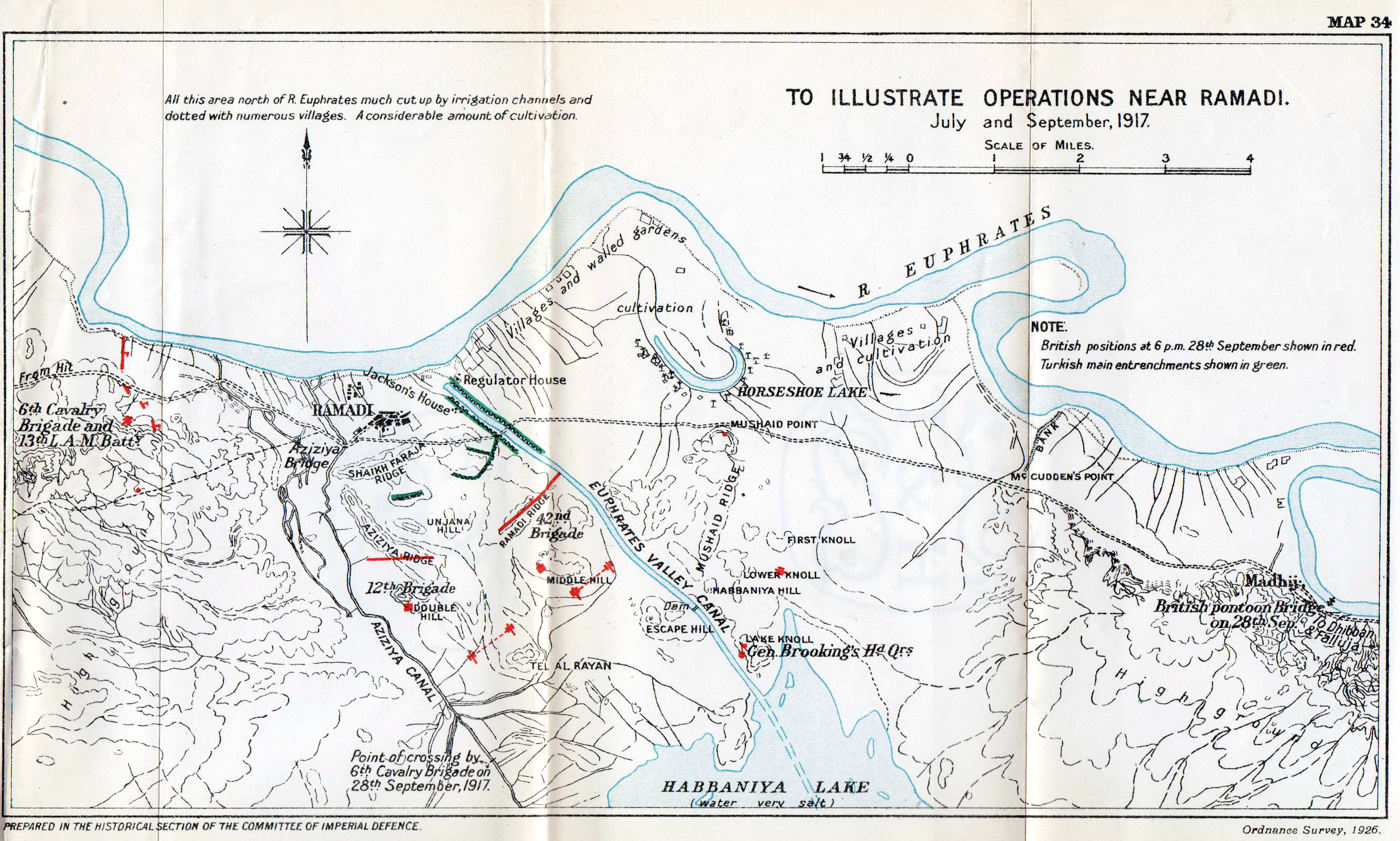
- Map of the battles of Ramadi
Date	28–29 September 1917 (1 day)
Location	Ramadi, Iraq
Result	British–Indian victory

Belligerents
British Empire: India; United Kingdom	Ottoman Empire

Commanders and leaders
(United Kingdom of Great Britain and Ireland) Harry Brooking	(Ottoman Empire) Ahmed Bey

Strength
1 infantry division, 1 cavalry brigade	3,500

Casualties and losses
1,000 (mostly light)	3,500 (mostly POW)

The second, ultimately successful, British effort to take Ramadi was mounted in September 1917. By this time the Turks had assembled a joint Turco-German force called the Yilderim ("Thunderbolt") Army Group, under the command of the German General Erich von Falkenhayn. The aim was to mount an attack into Iraq, marching down the Euphrates via Hīt and on to Baghdad. The threat never materialised, however, as the Germans were unable to complete the railway lines that were needed to support their troops in the field and the Yilderim Army Group was redirected to the Palestine front.

The threat of the Yilderim Army Group spurred the British to make another attempt to take Ramadi. Control of the town was also sought in order to deny the Turks access to fresh produce from the area, which was illicitly smuggled out of the British-controlled areas, and cut the desert road to Karbala. In mid-September 1917, General Maude ordered General Harry Brooking, commander of the 15th Indian Division, to undertake the operation. The division joined Brigadier General A. W. Andrew's 50th Indian Brigade at Falluja and set up forward positions at Madhij, east of Ramadi, by 20 September. The Turks were dug in along a line of sand dunes known as the Muskaid Ridge, about 6.5 km (4 miles) to the west of Madhij. Their main defensive positions were about 1.5 km (1 mile) further west, just south of Ramadi itself.

Brooking decided to mount a frontal attack from the south while using the 6th Indian Cavalry Brigade to cut off the garrison's line of retreat from the west. This would pin the Turks against the river, as there was no bridge at Ramadi. The Turks had assumed that the British would repeat the tactics they used in July and organised their defences accordingly to cover an arc running from the east to the south of the town. They expected to be able to use the road to the west to retreat if necessary. Since the July attack, the Turkish garrison had been substantially reinforced and now numbered 3,500 infantry, 500 artillery and 100 cavalry, with 10 artillery guns.

Brooking carried out an elaborate series of false preparations to bolster the Turks' belief that the British would once again seek to advance along the banks of the Euphrates. A pontoon bridge was built at Madhij on 28 September, troops were encamped along the river, and friendly Arab tribes were recruited to move supplies to the riverbank opposite Ramadi. Brooking's order to commence the attack was also deliberately vague, so as to conceal the true plan of attack from any Turkish spies in Madhij.

=== Course of the battle ===
At 21:45 on the night of 27 September, the infantry advance began with a march to the Mushaid Ridge, which they occupied with little opposition. Instead of continuing along the river bank, however, the 12th and 42nd Indian Brigades swung left to the Euphrates Valley Canal between the Euphrates and Lake Habbaniyah. They secured the dam across the canal by 15:00 on 28 September. Their advance in the intense heat was made possible by a water supply chain that Brooking had established using 350 Ford vans, which transported over 63,000 litres (14,000 gallons) of water on 28 September alone. Meanwhile, the 6th Cavalry Brigade had ridden across the desert to the south and west of Ramadi and reached the road 8 km (5 miles) west of the town by 16:00, where they dug in to block any Turkish retreat.

With artillery support, British forces advanced up two ridges to the south of Ramadi in the face of Turkish machine gun, rifle and artillery fire. Both were taken by the early afternoon of 28 September. The garrison's last escape route was now the Aziziya Bridge just to the west of Ramadi and, as the battle continued into the night under bright moonlight, a column of Turkish infantry sought to fight its way out of the trap at 03:00 on 29 September. Heavy British machine gun and artillery fire repelled them and drove the survivors back to Ramadi after an hour and half of fighting. The 39th Garhwal Rifles attacked the bridge, charging Turkish guns firing over open sights, and took it by 07:30 despite suffering heavy casualties; only 100 men from the three assaulting companies made it through.

The Garhwali advance convinced the Turkish defenders that the battle was lost. At 09:15, large numbers of Turks began surrendering to the Garhwalis at the bridge; by 09:30, as the rest of the British force advanced towards the mud walls of Ramadi, "white flags went up all along the enemy's line". By 11:00 the Turkish commander, Ahmed Bey, and the rest of the garrison had surrendered. The Turkish surrender came just in time, as a powerful sandstorm began shortly afterwards which reduced visibility to a few metres; had it struck earlier, the garrison could easily have slipped away.

=== Casualties and aftermath ===
120 Turkish troops were killed in the battle and another 190 were wounded. 3,456 prisoners were captured by the British, including 145 officers. Of the garrison, a handful escaped by swimming the Euphrates. British casualties numbered 995, though many of these had been only slightly wounded due to the Turkish shrapnel bursting too high to be of much effect. A great deal of materiel was seized, including 13 artillery pieces, 12 machine guns and large quantities of ammunition and other supplies. The capture of Ramadi also led to the local Arab tribes switching sides and supporting the British.

Maude later called the action "an instance of as clean and business-like a military operation as one could wish to see." The fall of the town was so sudden that on the day after the battle a German pilot attempted to land at Ramadi before he realised who now occupied it and made a hasty escape. The town was deemed sufficiently secure that on the following day, the British decided to continue their advance to assault Hīt, the next major Turkish-held town on the Euphrates.
