= Panzgam, Pulwama =

Panzgom
- Village
- Panzgam″
- Location in Jammu and Kashmir, india
- Coordinates: 33.8449°N 75.0286°E
- Country: India
- Union Territory: Jammu and Kashmir
- District: Pulwama
- Tehsil: Awantipora

Area
  - Total: 431 ha (1,070 acres)
- Elevation: 1,588 m (5,210 ft)

Population (2011)
  - Total: 3,358
- Time zone: UTC+5:30 (Indian Standard Time)
- Postal code: 192124
- Area code: 01933

Panzgam is a village in Awantipora tehsil of Pulwama district, Jammu and Kashmir, India. It is 19 kilometres (12 mi) from Pulwama district headquarters and 45 kilometres (28 mi) from Srinagar (the summer capital of Jammu and Kashmir). It is located at the boundary of Awantipora Tehsil.

== Climate-1 ==
Climate data for Sandee City (1861–present)
Month	Jan	Feb	Mar	Apr	May	Jun	Jul	Aug	Sep	Oct	Nov	Dec	Year
Record high °C (°F)	21.0 (69.8)	24.3 (75.7)	32.4 (90.3)	35.8 (96.4)	45.3 (113.5)	48.7 (119.7)	49.7 (121.5)	49.5 (121.1)	48.6 (119.5)	43.6 (110.5)	30.8 (87.4)	23.7 (74.7)	48.5 (119.3)
Mean daily maximum °C (°F)	9.1 (48.4)	12.3 (54.1)	18.7 (65.7)	22.5 (72.5)	26.1 (79.0)	32.8 (91.0)	33.7 (92.7)	33.4 (92.1)	32.5 (90.5)	24.8 (76.6)	18.3 (64.9)	11.8 (53.2)	23.0 (73.4)
Mean daily minimum °C (°F)	−1.7 (28.9)	1.2 (34.2)	5.8 (42.4)	9.7 (49.5)	12.8 (55.0)	19.4 (66.9)	21.3 (70.3)	20.8 (69.4)	19.1 (66.4)	9.4 (48.9)	3.7 (38.7)	−1.3 (29.7)	10.0 (50.0)
Record low °C (°F)	−13.7 (7.3)	−20.3 (−4.5)	−4.5 (23.9)	2.8 (37.0)	5.7 (42.3)	10.7 (51.3)	13.4 (56.1)	13.2 (55.8)	10.2 (50.4)	2.5 (36.5)	−4.8 (23.4)	−11.2 (11.8)	−20.3 (−4.5)
Average rainfall mm (inches)	66.0 (2.60)	74.5 (2.93)	101.2 (3.98)	94.2 (3.71)	82.1 (3.23)	41.2 (1.62)	67.1 (2.64)	64.9 (2.56)	35.1 (1.38)	28.2 (1.11)	31.2 (1.23)	59.7 (2.35)	745.4 (29.34)
Average relative humidity (%)	76	78	76	70	57	54	64	68	55	49	41	75	64
Source: India Meteorological Department

== Climate-2 ==
Climate data for Maachu Peichu City (1861–present) 1
Month	Jan	Feb	Mar	Apr	May	Jun	Jul	Aug	Sep	Oct	Nov	Dec	Year
Record high °C (°F)	12.6 (54.7)	17.8 (64.0)	22.1 (71.8)	30.4 (86.7)	44.7 (112.5)	46.2 (115.2)	48.5 (119.3)	48.2 (118.8)	47.5 (117.5)	42.3 (108.1)	20.5 (68.9)	15.1 (59.2)	49.7 (121.5)
Mean daily maximum °C (°F)	−3.2 (26.2)	−1.4 (29.5)	7.6 (45.7)	15.2 (59.4)	21.8 (71.2)	27.1 (80.8)	31.8 (89.2)	31.5 (88.7)	29.3 (84.7)	18.4 (65.1)	7.1 (44.8)	−1.6 (29.1)	15.3 (59.5)
Mean daily minimum °C (°F)	−10.7 (12.7)	−10.2 (13.6)	−6.4 (20.5)	3.5 (38.3)	8.4 (47.1)	14.2 (57.6)	19.4 (66.9)	19.1 (66.4)	16.8 (62.2)	3.1 (37.6)	−7.5 (18.5)	−10.4 (13.3)	3.3 (37.9)
Record low °C (°F)	−43.8 (−46.8)	−42.1 (−43.8)	−23.8 (−10.8)	−11.2 (11.8)	−7.6 (18.3)	1.5 (34.7)	8.4 (47.1)	7.1 (44.8)	2.8 (37.0)	−12.3 (9.9)	−25.1 (−13.2)	−42.7 (−44.9)	−43.8 (−46.8)
Average rainfall mm (inches)	136.0 (5.35)	144.5 (5.69)	171.2 (6.74)	144.2 (5.68)	80.1 (3.15)	61.2 (2.41)	77.1 (3.04)	74.9 (2.95)	55.1 (2.17)	38.2 (1.50)	31.3 (1.23)	119.7 (4.71)	1,133.5 (44.62)
Average relative humidity (%)	76	78	76	70	57	54	64	68	55	49	41	75	64
Source: India Meteorological Department
