= James Archibald Douglas =

Portrait by Walter Stoneman, 1922

Major General James Archibald Douglas CMG CIE, born 21 September 1862 in New Zealand, was an Indian Army officer who saw active service during World War I in Mesopotamia, Persia and in the Afghan War.

He was educated at Haileybury College, Hertfordshire between 1876 and 1878.

He joined the Dorset Regiment of the British Army in August 1883 after graduating from the Royal Military College, Sandhurst, and served for over 40 years, rising through the ranks, later joining the British Indian Army.

He held various command and staff positions in India, including inspector general of the Indian Army (1915) and quartermaster general in India (1916).

In 1892, as a lieutenant in the 2nd Bengal Rifles, he reported on the structure of the Persian Army, giving the British perspective of its strength and weaknesses. For his military service, he was made a Companion of the Order of the Indian Empire (CIE) in 1908 and a Companion of the Order of St Michael and St George (CMG) in 1915. He was on 16 September 1915 placed in command of a brigade and was granted the temporary rank of brigadier general while employed in this role.
