= 96th Berar Infantry =

- Active: 1797–1922
- Country: Indian Empire
- Branch: Army
- Type: Infantry
- Part of: Nizam's Contingent; Hyderabad Contingent; Madras Command
- Colors: Red; faced dark green.
- Engagements: Third Anglo-Maratha War; Second Burmese War; World War I

The 96th Berar Infantry were an infantry regiment of the British Indian Army. They could trace their origins to 1797, when they were raised as the 2nd Battalion of the Aurangabad Division for the Princely state of Hyderabad. Until 1853, the regiment was part of the Nizam of Hydrabad's Army then after signing of a treaty with the then Governor General of India, The Nizam's Contingent was renamed as the Hyderabad Contingent and became part of the regular Indian Army.

The regiment fought in the Battle of Mahidpur during the Third Anglo-Maratha War. They then participated in the Siege of Nowah and the later Capture of Nowah. They next participated in the annexation of Burma during the Second Burmese War. They next took part in the Central India Campaign after the Indian Rebellion of 1857.

After World War I the Indian government reformed the army moving from single battalion regiments to multi battalion regiments. In 1922, the 96th Berar Infantry became the 2nd Battalion, 19th Hyderabad Regiment. This regiment was allocated to the Indian Army after independence.

== Predecessor names ==
- 2nd Battalion, Aurangabad Division - 1797
- 2nd Battalion, Berar Infantry
- 3rd Regiment of Infantry, Nizam's Army - 1826
- 3rd Infantry, Hyderabad Contingent - 1854
- 96th Berar Infantry - 1903
