= 48th Pioneers =

- Active: 1901–1921
- Country: Indian Empire
- Branch: Army
- Type: Infantry
- Part of: Bengal Army (to 1895); Bengal Command
- Colors: Scarlet; faced emerald green, 1903 black

The 48th Pioneers were an infantry regiment of the British Indian Army. They could trace their origins to 1901, when they were raised as the 48th (Pioneers) Bengal Infantry. They were the last raised Bengal Infantry unit before the reorganization of the Indian Army in 1903. Compared to various other regiments, the 48th Pioneers were religiously diverse.

During World War I the regiment was part of 6th (Poona) Division and was captured in its entirety at the Siege of Kut, on 29 April 1916. A 2/48th Pioneers was reformed in Mesopotamia in May 1916, renumbered 48th Pioneers in June, and attached to 15th Indian Division.

After World War I the Indian government reformed the army moving from single battalion regiments to multi battalion regiments. In 1921, the 48th Pioneers now became the 4th Battalion, 2nd Bombay Pioneers. This became the Corps of Bombay Pioneers in 1929, which was subsequently disbanded in 1933.
