= 99th Deccan Infantry =

- Active: 1788–1922
- Country: Indian Empire
- Branch: Army
- Type: Infantry
- Part of: Nizam's Contingent; Hyderabad Contingent; Madras Command
- Colors: Red; faced dark green
- Engagements: Third Anglo-Maratha War; World War I

The 99th Deccan Infantry were an infantry regiment of the British Indian Army. They could trace their origins to 1788, when they were raised as the 1st Battalion of the Ellichpur Brigade for the Princely state of Hyderabad. Until 1853, the regiment was part of the Nizam of Hydrabad's Army then after signing of a treaty with the then Governor General of India, The Nizam's Contingent was renamed as the Hyderabad Contingent and became part of the regular Indian Army.

The regiment fought in the Battle of Mahidpur during the Third Anglo-Maratha War. They then participated in the Siege of Nowah and the later Capture of Nowah. During World War I the regiment served on the North West Frontier in operations against the Mahsuds around Sarwakai. Then in April 1917, they were sent to serve in the Mesopotamia Campaign. They were attached to the Euphrates Defence Force, which was charged with lines-of-communication duties along the Euphrates river. Although not at the front fighting the Turks, they did participate in operations against hostile Arabs, including two punitive expeditions from Nasiriyeh in March 1918. In June 1918, the battalion again saw action around hostile Arabs around Rumaithah.

After World War I the Indian government reformed the army moving from single battalion regiments to multi battalion regiments. In 1922, the 99th Deccan Infantry became the 5th Battalion, 19th Hyderabad Regiment. This regiment was allocated to the Indian Army after independence.

== Predecessor names ==
- 2nd Battalion of the Ellichpur Brigade - 1788
- 8th Regiment of Infantry, Nizam's Army - 1826
- 6th Infantry, Hyderabad Contingent - 1854
- 98th Deccan Infantry - 1903
