= 67th Punjabis =

- Active: 1759–1922
- Country: Indian Empire
- Branch: Army
- Type: Infantry
- Part of: Madras Army (to 1895); Madras Command
- Colors: Red; faced, 1857 sky-blue, 1882 yellow, 1905 green, 1914 emerald green
- Engagements: Carnatic Wars; Third Anglo-Mysore War; World War I Third Afghan War

The 67th Punjabis were an infantry regiment of the British Indian Army. They could trace their origins to 1759, when they were raised as the 8th Battalion Coast Sepoys.

The regiment's first action was during the Carnatic Wars followed by the Third Anglo-Mysore War.

In 1914, during World War I the regiment was at first in the 4th (Quetta) Division which remained in India, on internal security and as a training unit. A second battalion was formed and both were posted overseas and served in the 12th Indian Division which fought in the Battle of Shaiba, the Battle of Khafajiya and the Battle of Nasiriya in the Mesopotamia Campaign. Two platoons were also posted to Tabriz, Iran as part of the Norperforce. The second battalion was also involved in the Mesopotamia campaign with the 14th Indian Division and fought in the Second Battle of Kut and the Fall of Baghdad (1917). Both battalions then served in the Third Afghan War.

After World War I the Indian government reformed the army moving from single battalion regiments to multi battalion regiments. In 1922, the 1st and 2nd battalions, 67th Punjabis became the 1st and 10th (Training) Battalions, 2nd Punjab Regiment. After independence they were one of the regiments allocated to the Indian Army.

Post independence, the regiment was renamed the Punjab Regiment (India) and the original battalion became part of the 50th Parachute Brigade along with 3 Maratha and 1 Kumaon. In April 1952, 1st Punjab (Para), along with 3 Maratha (Para) and 1 Kumaon (Para) were amalgamated to form the Parachute Regiment, with 1st Punjab (Para) being renamed 1 Para (Punjab), 3 Maratha (Para) being renamed 2 Para (Maratha) and 1 Kumaon (Para) 3 Para (Kumaon). The suffix 'Punjab' was later dropped in 1960. In 1978, the unit became the third commando battalion of the Indian Army after 9 and 10 Para Cdo. Presently, the unit is called 1st Para (Special Forces) and celebrated its 250 Raising Day in October 2011.

== Predecessor names ==
- 8th Battalion Coast Sepoys – 1759
- 8th Carnatic Battalion – 1769
- 7th Carnatic Battalion – 1770
- 7th Madras Battalion – 1784
- 1st Battalion, 7th Madras Native Infantry – 1796
- 7th Madras Native Infantry – 1824
- 7th Madras Infantry – 1885
- 67th Punjabis – 1903

== Sources ==
- Barthorp, Michael; Burn, Jeffrey (1979). Indian Infantry Regiments 1860–1914. Osprey Publishing. ISBN 0-85045-307-0.
- Haldane, J. Aylmer L. Sir (2005). The Insurrection in Mesopotamia, 1920. London: The Imperial War Museum in association with the Battery Press. ISBN 1904897169. OCLC 60688896. OL 22727753M. 1904897169.
- Moberly, Frederick James (1927) [1923]. The Campaign in Mesopotamia 1914–1918. History of the Great War Based on Official Documents. Vol. I. London: HMSO. OCLC 772784341.
- Rinaldi, Richard A (2008). Order of Battle British Army 1914. Ravi Rikhye. ISBN 978-0-9776072-8-0.
- Sharma, Gautam (1990). Valour and Sacrifice: Famous Regiments of the Indian Army. Allied Publishers. ISBN 81-7023-140-X.
- Sumner, Ian (2001). The Indian Army 1914-1947. Osprey Publishing. ISBN 1-84176-196-6.
