= 43rd Erinpura Regiment =

Regiment of the British Indian Army

- Active: 1860-1922
- Country: Indian Empire
- Branch: Army
- Type: Infantry
- Part of: Bengal Army (to 1895); Bengal Command
- Colors: Green; faced red. Red trousers

The 43rd Erinpura Regiment was a regiment of the British Indian Army. It originated in the three infantry companies of Meena, Bhil tribe of the Jodhpur Legion that stayed loyal to the British when the Legion revolted in 1857. (The Bhil companies had been raised in 1841.)

They were incorporated in 1860 as the Erinpoorah (or Erinpura) Irregular Force by a Lt-Col J F W Hall. This force was composed of a squadron of cavalry, mainly Sikhs, numbering, 164 of all ranks, and eight companies of infantry, numbering 719. The British mostly enlisted Bhils and Minas in the infantry to provide employment to people of the local tribes and thus ween them away from their lawless habits.

From end 1870 to 1881 the commandant was in political charge of the Sirohi district and on several occasions he sent out detachments to support the police in patrolling disturbed areas and arresting dacoits.

In 1895 the strength of the cavalry squadron was reduced from 164 to 100 of all ranks.

In 1897 the force, which had till then been under the Foreign Department of the Government of India, was placed under the Commander-in-Chief.

After the Kitchener reforms of the Indian Army in 1903, it was renamed the 43rd (Erinpura) Regiment. The regiment was made up of four double companies of infantry recruited from Rajputana Hindus and Muslims. The regimental depot was at Erinpura in Rajasthan throughout its history from 1860–1921. On the outbreak of World War I the 43rd was serving as part of the 5th (Mhow) Division.

During World War I the regiment served in the 15th Indian Division during the Mesopotamia Campaign. The first or regular battalion was employed mainly in escort duties and guarding line of communication, although it was present at the Second Battle of Ramada in September 1917.

A second battalion was raised in 1917. As a war-time unit lacking experienced personnel it was employed mainly for guard and other security purposes in Bombay, before being disbanded in 1920.

After World War I the Indian government reformed the army again moving from single-battalion infantry units to multi-battalion regiments. As part of this reorganisation nine infantry regiments were disbanded. The 43rd Erinpura Regiment was one of these and was disbanded in October 1921.

== Sources ==
- Barthorp, Michael; Burn, Jeffrey (1979). Indian infantry regiments 1860-1914. Osprey Publishing. ISBN 0-85045-307-0.
- Sumner, Ian (2001). The Indian Army 1914-1947. Osprey Publishing. ISBN 1-84176-196-6.
