= 43rd Indian Brigade =

- Active: 31 March 1917 – 1923
- Country: British India
- Allegiance: British Crown
- Branch: British Indian Army
- Type: Infantry
- Size: Brigade
- Part of: 16th Indian Division
- Service: First World War; Third Anglo-Afghan War

The 43rd Indian Brigade was an infantry brigade of the British Indian Army that formed part of the Indian Army during the First World War. It was formed in March 1917 as part of the 16th Indian Division for service on the North West Frontier. It remained in India throughout the First World War but saw active service in the Third Anglo-Afghan War. Post-war, it was designated as 21st Indian Infantry Brigade in September 1920 and took over responsibility for the Jubbulpore Brigade Area in 1923.

== History ==
From March 1916, it was intended to form a reserve division for the North West Frontier, but the urgent need to find troops for Mesopotamia meant that the 16th Indian Division was not formed until December 1916. In March 1917, 43rd Indian Brigade was formed in the new division. The brigade remained on the North West Frontier throughout the First World War but was mobilized with 16th Indian Division to take part in the Third Anglo-Afghan War.

In September 1920, the brigade was redesignated as 21st Indian Infantry Brigade – not to be confused with an identically designated but unrelated 21st Indian Infantry Brigade of the Second World War. In 1923, the brigade took over responsibility for the Jubbulpore Brigade Area.

== Orders of battle ==
First World War units
The brigade commanded the following units during the First World War:
- 1/9th Battalion, Hampshire Regiment (Note: The 2/6th Battalion, Royal Sussex Regiment, the 1/9th Battalion, Hampshire Regiment, the 1/25th Battalion, the London Regiment and the 1/1st Kent Cyclist Battalion were originally bicycle infantry. In November 1915 they were converted to infantry and formed a brigade, originally intended for service in East Africa. Instead, they sailed for India in February 1916.) (arrived in December 1916 from Bangalore, 9th (Secunderabad) Division; transferred in June 1917 to 44th (Ferozepore) Brigade)
- 1/5th Battalion, Prince Albert's (Somerset Light Infantry) (arrived in January 1917 from Meerut; transferred to Poona in March)
- 2nd Battalion, 8th Gurkha Rifles (arrived in January 1917 from Lansdowne, 7th Meerut Divisional Area; transferred in April to 3rd (Abbottabad) Brigade, 2nd (Rawalpindi) Division)
- 2nd Battalion, 2nd King Edward's Own Gurkha Rifles (The Sirmoor Rifles) (arrived in January 1917 from Dehra Dun Brigade, 7th Meerut Divisional Area; transferred in January 1918 for Derajat Brigade)
- 1/9th Battalion, Duke of Cambridge's Own (Middlesex Regiment) (arrived in February 1917 from 5th (Jhelum) Brigade, 2nd (Rawalpindi) Division; transferred in March to Ambala Brigade)
- Mahindra Dal Battalion (Note: The 1st Rifle Battalion, the Pasupati Prasad Battalion, the Sri Nath Battalion and the Mahindra Dal Battalion were units of the Nepalese Army.) (joined in April 1917 from the Nepalese Brigade in 7th Meerut Divisional Area; transferred in May to 45th (Jullundur) Brigade)
- 1/25th Battalion, the London Regiment (joined in May 1917 from 45th (Jullundur) Brigade, 3rd Lahore Divisional Area; transferred in August to 45th (Jullundur) Brigade)
- 1/4th Battalion, Queen's (Royal West Surrey Regiment) (joined in May 1917 from Lahore; transferred in January 1918 to Ambala Brigade)
- 54th Sikhs (Frontier Force) (joined in May 1917 from Kohat Brigade; transferred in July to Derajat Brigade)
- 1st Rifle Battalion (joined in May 1917 from Derajat Brigade; transferred in August to the Nepalese Brigade in 2nd (Rawalpindi) Division)
- 1st Battalion, 4th Gurkha Rifles (joined in June 1917 from Derajat Brigade; transferred in September to 44th (Ferozepore) Brigade)
- Pasupati Prasad Battalion (joined in August 1917 from the Nepalese Brigade in 2nd (Rawalpindi) Division and returned there in October)
- 2/6th Battalion, Royal Sussex Regiment (joined in August 1917 from 45th (Jullundur) Brigade; left in March 1918 for Lahore)
- 12th Pioneers (The Kelat-i-Ghilzai Regiment) (joined in September 1917 from Bannu Brigade; left in March 1918 for 4th (Quetta) Division)
- 2nd Battalion, 12th Pioneers (The Kelat-i-Ghilzai Regiment) (joined in December 1917 from Lahore; transferred in March 1918 for 45th (Jullundur) Brigade)

Third Anglo-Afghan War units
July 1918 plans saw the brigade mobilizing with the following units: 2/6th Battalion, Royal Sussex Regiment; 117th Mahrattas; Sri Nath Battalion; 1st Rifle Battalion	In the event, the brigade mobilized in May 1919 with: 2/6th Battalion, Royal Sussex Regiment; 2nd Battalion, 10th Jats; 2nd Battalion, 27th Punjabis; 2nd Battalion, 124th Duchess of Connaught's Own Baluchistan Infantry

== Commanders ==
The 43rd Indian Brigade / 21st Indian Infantry Brigade had the following commanders:

From	Rank	Name	Notes
31 March 1917	Brigadier-General	W.M. Southey	
28 September 1918	Brigadier-General	J.L.J. Clarke	
October 1919	Brigadier-General	G. Gwyn-Thomas	
March 1921	Brigadier-General	A.B. Tillard	
June 1921	Brigadier-General	W.J. Mitchell	Jubbulpore Brigade Area in 1923

== See also ==
- 21st Indian Infantry Brigade of the Second World War
- 43rd Indian Infantry Brigade of the Second World War

== Bibliography ==
- Gaylor, John (1996). Sons of John Company: The Indian and Pakistan Armies 1903–1991 (2nd ed.). Tunbridge Wells: Parapress. ISBN 1-898594-41-4.
- James, Brigadier E.A. (1978). British Regiments 1914–18. London: Samson Books Limited. ISBN 0-906304-03-2.
- Mackie, Colin (June 2015). "Army Commands 1900-2011" (PDF). www.gulabin.com. Archived from the original (PDF) on 5 July 2015.
- Perry, F.W. (1993). Order of Battle of Divisions Part 5B. Indian Army Divisions. Newport: Ray Westlake Military Books. ISBN 1-871167-23-X.
