= 44th (Ferozepore) Brigade =

Ferozepore Brigade 44th (Ferozepore) Brigade Ferozepore Brigade Area
- Active: 7 December 1914 – February 1942
- Country: British India
- Allegiance: British Crown
- Branch: British Indian Army
- Type: Infantry
- Size: Brigade
- Part of: 3rd Lahore Divisional Area; 16th Indian Division; Lahore District
- Garrison/HQ: Ferozepore
- Service: First World War; Third Anglo-Afghan War; Second World War

Commanders
- Notable commanders: Br.-Gen. A.M.S. Elsmie

The Ferozepore Brigade was an infantry brigade of the British Indian Army that formed part of the Indian Army during the First World War. It was formed in December 1914 as part of the 3rd Lahore Divisional Area for service on the North West Frontier and renamed as 44th (Ferozepore) Brigade in August 1915. It remained in India throughout the First World War but saw active service in the Third Anglo-Afghan War with the 16th Indian Division.

Post-war, the brigade underwent a number of changes in designation before settling on Ferozepore Brigade Area by the outbreak of the Second World War. It was broken up in February 1942.

== History ==
At the outbreak of the First World War, the Ferozepore Brigade was part of the 3rd (Lahore) Division. It was mobilized in August 1914 with the division as the 7th (Ferozepore) Brigade and sailed from Bombay and Karachi between 24 and 29 September for the Western Front. The 3rd Lahore Divisional Area was formed in September 1914 to take over the area responsibilities of the 3rd (Lahore) Division and in December 1914 (Note: The first commanding officer was appointed on 7 December 1914.) a new Ferozepore Brigade was formed in 3rd Lahore Divisional Area to replace the original brigade. In August 1915 it was designated as 44th (Ferozepore) Brigade.

From March 1916, it was intended to form a reserve division for the North West Frontier, but the urgent need to find troops for Mesopotamia meant that the 16th Indian Division was not formed until December 1916. In February 1917 the brigade was transferred to the new division. The brigade remained on the North West Frontier throughout the First World War but was mobilized with 16th Indian Division to take part in the Third Anglo-Afghan War.

In September 1920, the brigade was redesignated as 12th Indian Infantry Brigade and as 16th Indian Infantry Brigade from October 1921 – not to be confused with an identically designated but unrelated 12th and 16th Indian Infantry Brigades of the Second World War. In 1923, the brigade was once again renamed Ferozepore Brigade. By the outbreak of the Second World War it was designated as Ferozepore Brigade Area and it was broken up in February 1942.

== Orders of battle ==
With 3rd Lahore Divisional Area
The brigade commanded the following units while serving with the 3rd Lahore Divisional Area:
- 2nd Battalion, 4th Gurkha Rifles (arrived in September 1914 from 8th (Jullundur) Brigade, 3rd (Lahore) Division; transferred to Kohat Brigade in November)
- 1/4th Battalion, Devonshire Regiment (arrived in December 1914 with 43rd (Wessex) Division; left for Mesopotamia, arriving at Basra on 2 March 1916 and joined 42nd Indian Brigade, 15th Indian Division)
- 2/4th Battalion, Duke of Cornwall's Light Infantry (Note: 2/4th DCLI, 2/6th Sussex, 1/1st Kent, 2nd/1st Gurkhas, 1st/4th Gurkhas and 3rd/5th Gurkhas were all assigned to the brigade when it was transferred to 16th Indian Division in February 1917 but all left soon afterwards.) (arrived in March 1916 from Multan; transferred in February 1917 to Bareilly Brigade, 7th Meerut Divisional Area)
- 1st Battalion, 4th Gurkha Rifles (joined in March 1916 from Egypt; transferred in April 1917 to Derajat Brigade)
- 3rd Battalion, 5th Gurkha Rifles (Frontier Force) (formed on 28 November 1916 as 2nd Reserve Gurkha Battalion, redesignated on 29 May 1917; transferred in April 1917 to 4th (Rawalpindi) Brigade, 2nd (Rawalpindi) Division)
- 2nd Battalion, 1st King George's Own Gurkha Rifles (The Malaun Regiment) (joined in December 1916 from Jullundur and returned in April 1917)
- 1/1st Kent Cyclist Battalion (Note: 2/6th Sussex, 1/9th Hampshire, 1/25th London and 1/1st Kent were originally bicycle infantry. In November 1915 they were converted to infantry and formed a brigade, originally intended for service in East Africa. Instead, they sailed for India in February 1916.) (arrived in January 1917 from Southern Brigade, 9th (Secunderabad) Division; detached to Bannu Brigade from April to July 1917)
- 2/6th Battalion, Royal Sussex Regiment (arrived in January 1917 from Southern Brigade, 9th (Secunderabad) Division; transferred in May to 45th (Jullundur) Brigade)

With 16th Indian Division
The brigade commanded the following units while serving with the 16th Indian Division:
- 98th Infantry (joined in February 1917 from East Africa; transferred in July to 2nd Quetta Brigade)
- 1/9th Battalion, Hampshire Regiment (joined in June 1917 from 43rd Indian Brigade; transferred in February 1918 to Ambala Brigade)
- 2nd Battalion, 89th Punjabis (formed in June 1917; transferred in October to Dargai, 1st (Peshawar) Division)
- 1/1st Kent Cyclist Battalion (rejoined in July 1917 from detachment to Bannu Brigade)
- 1st Battalion, 4th Gurkha Rifles (joined in September 1917 from 43rd Indian Brigade; transferred in November to Kohat Brigade)
- 71st Punjabis (joined in December 1917 from Montgomery; transferred in May 1918 to Bushire)
- 2nd Battalion, 1st King George's Own Gurkha Rifles (The Malaun Regiment) (joined in December 1917 from 45th (Jullundur) Brigade; transferred in January 1918 to 2nd (Nowshera) Brigade, 1st (Peshawar) Division)
- 1st Battalion, Kashmir Infantry (I.S.) (joined in December 1917 from Gilgit; left in February 1918 and sailed from Karachi for Palestine where it joined 30th Brigade, British 10th Division on 30 April)
- 1st Battalion, 30th Punjabis (joined in January 1918 from East Africa)
- 2nd Battalion, 30th Punjabis (formed in December 1917 at Lahore and joined in January 1918; left in May and sailed from Bombay for Palestine where it joined 180th Brigade, British 60th Division on 13 July)
- 2nd Battalion, 91st Punjabis (Light Infantry) (formed in February 1918; transferred in August to Jubbulpore Brigade, 5th (Mhow) Division)
- 3rd Battalion, Kashmir Rifles (I.S.) (joined in February 1918 from East Africa; left in July and sailed from Bombay for Palestine and joined 232nd Brigade, British 75th Division on 3 August)
- 3rd Battalion, 30th Punjabis (joined in August 1918 from Ambala Brigade)
- 61st King George's Own Pioneers (joined in August 1918 from Southern Brigade, 9th (Secunderabad) Division)
- 1/4th Battalion, Queen's (Royal West Surrey Regiment) (joined in September 1918 from 45th (Jullundur) Brigade)
- 2nd Battalion, 17th Infantry (The Loyal Regiment) (joined in October 1918 from Presidency Brigade, 8th (Lucknow) Division)
- 4th Battalion, 30th Punjabis (joined in December 1918 from Ambala Brigade)

Third Anglo-Afghan War units
July 1918 plans saw the brigade mobilizing with the following units: 1/1st Kent Cyclist Battalion; 1st Battalion, 30th Punjabis; 61st King George's Own Pioneers; 2nd Battalion, 129th Duke of Connaught's Own Baluchis	In the event, the brigade mobilized in May 1919 with: 1/1st Kent Cyclist Battalion; 1st Battalion, 6th Jat Light Infantry; 1st Battalion, 30th Punjabis; 2nd Battalion, 30th Punjabis

Ferozepore Brigade Area on 3 September 1939
At the outbreak of the Second World War, the brigade area had the following units under command:
- 2nd Battalion, Green Howards
- 2nd Battalion, Duke of Wellington's Regiment (at Multan)
- Sam Browne's Cavalry (12th Frontier Force) (Training) (Note: Sam Browne's Cavalry (12th Frontier Force) was one of three cavalry training regiments – along with 15th Lancers and 20th Lancers – from 1936.)
- 2nd Battalion, 1st Punjab Regiment (at Multan)
- 5th Battalion, 10th Baluch Regiment
- 10th Battalion, 14th Punjab Regiment (Note: 10th Battalion, 14th Punjab Regiment was the Training Battalion / Regimental Centre of the 14th Punjab Regiment.)
- U Field Battery, RA
- 23rd/24th Medium Battery, RA

== Commanders ==
The 44th (Ferozepore) Brigade / 12th Indian Infantry Brigade / 16th Indian Infantry Brigade / Ferozepore Brigade Area had the following commanders:

From	Rank	Name	Notes
7 December 1914	Brigadier-General	A.H. Eustace	
20 May 1915	Brigadier-General	R.M. Betham	
23 April 1916	Brigadier-General	G.D. Crocker	
18 January 1918	Brigadier-General	A.M.S. Elsmie	
October 1918	Brigadier-General	W.M. Southey	
December 1919	Brigadier-General	A.J. Poole	
December 1923	Brigadier-General	R.J.F. Hayter	
December 1927	Brigadier	I.U. Battye	
November 1930	Brigadier	B.W. Shuttleworth	
October 1934	Brigadier	H.M. Burrows	
November 1937	Brigadier	C.M.S. Manners	
1941	Brigadier	G.O. de R. Channer	Broken up February 1942

== See also ==
- 7th (Ferozepore) Brigade of the First World War
- 44th Indian Infantry Brigade of the Second World War

== Bibliography ==
- Gaylor, John (1996). Sons of John Company: The Indian and Pakistan Armies 1903–1991 (2nd ed.). Tunbridge Wells: Parapress. ISBN 1-898594-41-4.
- James, Brigadier E.A. (1978). British Regiments 1914–18. London: Samson Books Limited. ISBN 0-906304-03-2.
- Mackie, Colin (June 2015). "Army Commands 1900-2011" (PDF). www.gulabin.com. Archived from the original (PDF) on 5 July 2015.
- Nafziger, George (n.d.). "The Indian Army 3 September 1939" (PDF). Fort Leavenworth: Combined Arms Research Library, United States Army Combined Arms Center.
- Perry, F.W. (1993). Order of Battle of Divisions Part 5B. Indian Army Divisions. Newport: Ray Westlake Military Books. ISBN 1-871167-23-X.
