= 9th Battalion, Middlesex Regiment =

9th Battalion, Middlesex Regiment (Duke of Cambridge's Own)
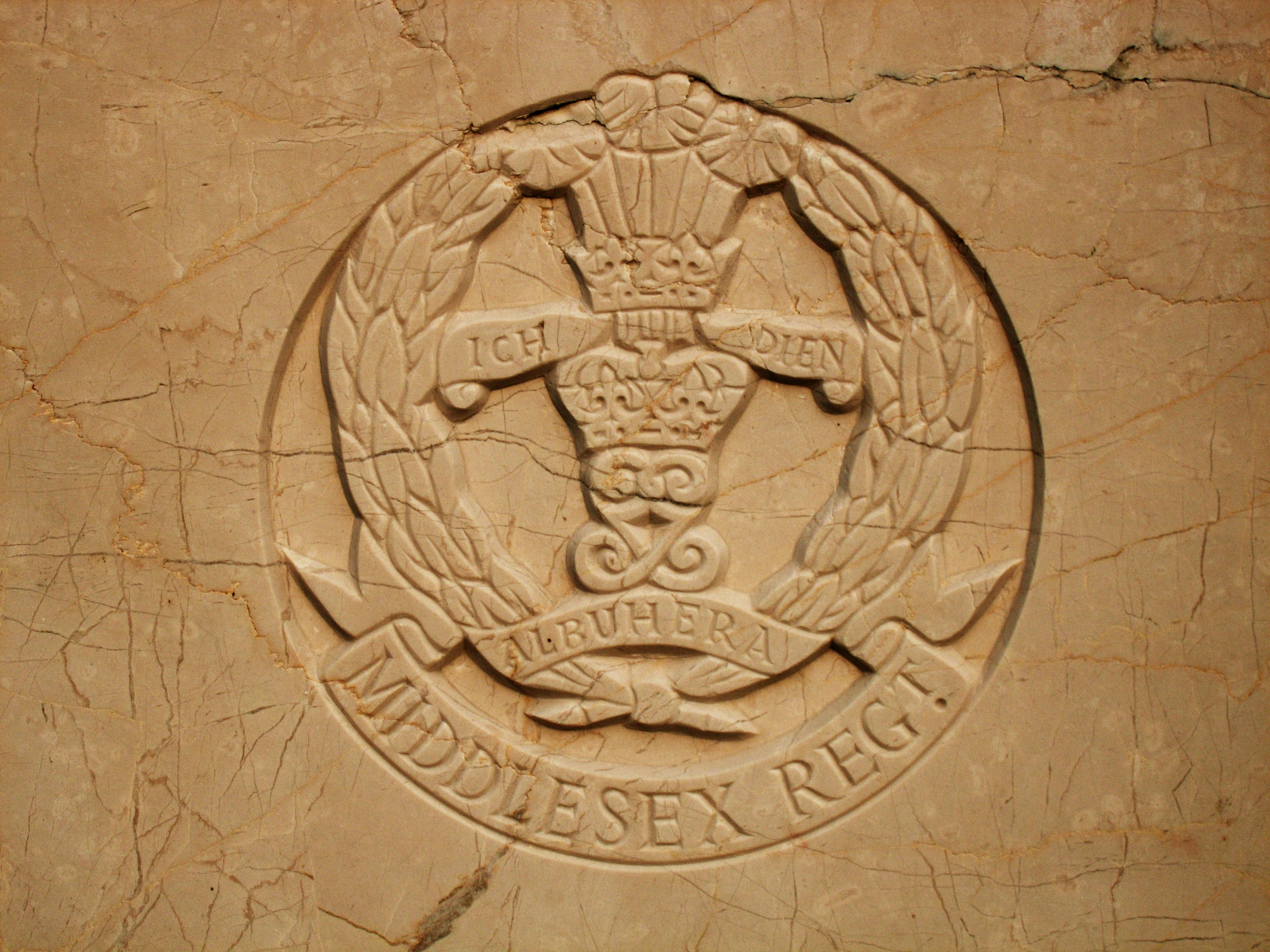
- Cap badge of the Middlesex Regiment (Duke of Cambridge's Own)
- Active: 14 October 1859–1 May 1961
- Country: United Kingdom
- Branch: Territorial Army
- Type: Infantry; Air defence
- Garrison/HQ: Lord's Cricket Ground (1859–1880s); Willesden (1880s–WWII); Kingsbury (1947–1961)
- Anniversaries: Albuhera Day (16 May).
- Engagements: World War I: Battle of Sharqat; World War II: Battle of Britain; Operation Diver; North West Europe

Commanders
- Notable commanders: Lord Radstock; John Charles Templer

The 9th Battalion, Middlesex Regiment was an infantry battalion of the British Army. Part of the Volunteer Force, later the Territorial Force (renamed the Territorial Army in 1920), the battalion was part of the Middlesex Regiment (Duke of Cambridge's Own) and recruited from the north-western suburbs of London. It served as infantry in the Mesopotamian campaign during World War I and as an air defence regiment during and after World War II.

== Origins ==
The battalion's origins lay in the enthusiasm for joining local Rifle Volunteer Corps (RVCs) engendered by an invasion scare in 1859. Two of the many units formed in the populous county of Middlesex were the 'Marylebone & West Middlesex Rifles' and the 'Harrow Rifles'.

=== Marylebone & West Middlesex Rifles ===
The 9th (Marylebone & West Middlesex) Middlesex RVC was formed at Lord's Cricket Ground on 14 October 1859 under the command of Lord Radstock. Initially consisting of six companies, it rose to eight by April 1860.

Under the 'Localisation of the Forces' scheme introduced in 1872 by the Cardwell Reforms, the 9th Middlesex RVC (with the 18th attached, see below) formed part of Brigade No 49 (Middlesex and Metropolitan) alongside the Regular battalions of the Royal Fusiliers (the City of London Regiment).

The unit was renumbered the 5th (West Middlesex) Middlesex RVC on 3 September 1880 and was attached as a Volunteer Battalion (VB) to the Royal Fusiliers on 1 July the following year, transferring to the King's Royal Rifle Corps (KRRC) as the 4th VB in July 1883, without changing its title in either case. Its original uniform was grey with red facings, but in 1891 it adopted the KRRC's Rifle green with red facings. Its HQ was at 29 Park Road, Regent's Park.

The Stanhope Memorandum of December 1888 proposed a Mobilisation Scheme for units of the Volunteer Force, which would assemble by brigades at key points in case of war. In peacetime the brigades provided a structure for collective training. The 5th Middlesex RVC (with the renumbered 9th still attached, see below) formed part of the South London Volunteer Infantry Brigade. By the time the Volunteer Force was subsumed into the Territorial Force in 1908, the battalion had moved to the 1st London Brigade.

Volunteers from the unit served in the Second Boer War, earning it the Battle honour South Africa 1900–02.

=== Harrow Rifles ===
The 18th (Harrow Rifles) Middlesex RVC was formed at Harrow as a single company on 30 December 1859. Many of the original recruits came from the staff and senior pupils of Harrow School, which formed a cadet corps of the unit in 1870. The first commanding officer was Captain John Charles Templer, who was the agent for Rajah Brooke of Sarawak, and in 1861 became editor of the Volunteer Service Gazette, the official journal of the Volunteer Movement. The unit also ran its own athletic club. It was always associated with the West Middlesex; together, they formed a battalion-sized unit within the Volunteer Infantry Brigades.

In the renumbering of 1880, the Harrow unit became the 9th Middlesex RVC and like the 5th was attached to the Royal Fusiliers in 1881, transferring to the KRRC in 1883. Its uniform was Rifle green with green facings. On 1 August 1899 (now 4 companies strong) it amalgamated with the West Middlesex, the Harrow School Cadet Corps becoming the 27th Corps until 1906 when it too joined the West Middlesex as a cadet company.

== Territorial Force ==
On the formation of the Territorial Force in 1908, the 5th (West Middlesex) RVC became the 9th Battalion Middlesex Regiment. It formed part of the Middlesex Brigade of the Home Counties Division. Its headquarters moved to Pound Lane, Willesden Green.

== World War I ==
=== Mobilisation ===
During the period of tension before the outbreak of war, the 9th Battalion sent two special service sections to guard a cable station at Cuckmere Haven and Birling Gap (28 July). When the mobilisation orders were received on 4 August 1914, the Home Counties Division was on the march from Aldershot to Salisbury Plain for its annual training. The Middlesex Brigade had reached Larkhill, when the battalions were sent back to their headquarters to mobilise. The 9th Battalion entrained at Amesbury on 5 August and reached Willesden that morning. By the end of the day the battalion was entrained again for its war station at Sheerness. Here it dug trenches for a few days until relieved by Special Reserve troops and moved to Sittingbourne.

On 11 August, in common with the majority of the men of the Home Counties Division, the 9th Battalion accepted liability for overseas service. The Home Service-only and under-age men, together with the recruits who were flooding in, remained at the depots to form 2nd-Line battalions. The titles of these 2nd Line units were the same as the original 1st Line, but the two would be distinguished by '1/' and '2/' prefixes. The 2/9th Bn formed on 18 September; subsequently, a 3/9th Battalion was formed to provide drafts to the other battalions.

=== 1/9th Battalion ===
==== India ====
In October 1914, the Home Counties Division was ordered to India to relieve Regular troops there. The 1/9th Middlesex embarked at Southampton on 29 October in the transports Dilwara and Dongola, and disembarked at Bombay on 2 December. On arrival, the Home Counties Division was split up and the battalions were distributed to stations all over India. For the next three years they acted as a peacetime garrison, while suffering a steady drain of their best men to officer training and other duties.

1/9th Middlesex was assigned to the Presidency Brigade in 8th (Lucknow) Division, based around Calcutta. The main body was stationed at Dinapur, with E, F and H Companies detached to guard the arsenal at Dum Dum; later D and F Companies went to garrison Barrackpore, where they were responsible for guarding the Rifle Factory Ishapore and the Cossipore gun and shell factory. When the four-company system was adopted in May 1915, the companies at Dinapur provided A and B Companies together with the battalion scouts and machine-gunners, those at Barrackpore became C Company, and those Dum Dum became D Company and the signallers.

In May and August 1915, the battalion supplied its first drafts to the 2nd Bn Norfolk Regiment serving in Indian Expeditionary Force D in Mesopotamia; of the 50 other ranks sent, 20 died at the Siege of Kut or in captivity afterwards. In January 1916, the battalion was transferred to the 5th (Jhelum) Brigade, 2nd (Rawalpindi) Division, on the North West Frontier. On arrival at Rawalpindi, it was ordered to mobilise for service with Force D. However, the order was quickly cancelled, and for the next two years the battalion continued to train. During this period, it was constantly moving station:

- March–April 1916 to Nowshera Brigade, 1st (Peshawar) Division, for mountain warfare training;
- April–June to Murree;
- June–November to Galis Brigade, with one company detached to guard Attock Fort;
- November returned to Jhelum Brigade
- February 1917 to 43rd Indian Brigade in 16th Indian Division, a reserve division for the North West Frontier
- March 1917 to Ambala Brigade in 3rd Lahore Divisional Area (the 3rd (Lahore) Division being absent, serving in Mesopotamia). Here, the battalion received a large draft from the 7th Reserve Battalion (see below) and from the Essex Regiment, which partly restored its strength after years of losing men to sickness and supplying so many drafts and specialists.

From November 1917, the battalion reverted to the title of 9th Middlesex when the 2/9th Bn disbanded in England (see below).

==== Mesopotamia ====
In October 1917, the 9th Bn was selected to be the British battalion in a new 53rd Indian Brigade being sent to the Mesopotamian Front. On 5 November it was brought up to full strength with drafts of 100 menfrom the 1/10th Middlesex and 200 from the 1/25th London Regiment. The men from 1/25th Londons, formerly a bicycle battalion, were disappointed at being spread across all 16 platoons of the 1/9th rather than being kept together as a distinct company. The battalion embarked on the transport Egra at Karachi on 19 November. It landed at Basra on 23 November and the brigade became part of 18th Indian Division at Baghdad on 24 December.

The division was not concentrated until mid-March 1918, and when it moved north up the Tigris, 53rd Brigade was left behind to subdue Nejef, south of Baghdad. After making a forced march of nearly 90 miles in a week through almost waterless country and carried out a demonstration, the brigade was being withdrawn when trouble flared up again. The town was then blockaded from 21 March to 19 May, with the 9th Middlesex being involved in minor actions. The battalion celebrated Albuera Day in the Mesopotamian desert. 53rd Brigade then rejoined the division at Akab, near Samarra. Summer weather made campaigning impractical in Mesopotamia, so the division was engaged in roadbuilding until the beginning of October, when orders were received to join the renewed advance up the Tigris.

9th Middlesex moved up to Tikrit on 10 October, arriving on 14 October, with many men suffering from sickness. The division began its attack (the Battle of Sharqat) on 24 October, with 53rd Brigade in support. The brigade passed through the Fathah Gorge and the following day pushed on under artillery and machine-gun fire to establish a bridgehead over the Little Zab. Between 11.00 on 25 October and 17.00 on 26 October, the infantry covered 35 miles (56 km). On 26 October, the brigade patrolled forward up the left bank of the Tigris and the right bank of the Little Zab, and demonstrated towards Humr Bridge, to make the Turks think that a crossing was planned. That the night the Turks began to retreat and on 27 October, 53rd Brigade began a pursuit march, delayed only by Turkish artillery fire.

The Turkish force surrendered on the evening of 29 October, when 9th Middlesex was about to support an attack on the opposite bank of the Tigris. 18th Indian Division pushed a flying column on to capture Mosul, while the infantry retired towards its railhead at Baiji for supplies. After the Armistice of Mudros came into effect on 31 October, the division began preparing for the postwar occupation of Iraq as the Turks withdrew.

Demobilisation began in early 1919, but on 23 May the battalion (now reduced to three companies) was ordered to join a punitive column marching into Kurdistan. The column was in contact with insurgents from 28 May to 18 June when the rebel leader was wounded and captured. While 'mopping up' after the formal surrender, two companies of the 9th Middlesex and two squadrons of Indian cavalry found themselves surrounded near Kirkuk. They were pinned down for three days under heavy rifle fire, with rations being dropped to them by the Royal Air Force, before being relieved.

The battalion was demobilised on 11 September 1919.

=== 2/9th Battalion ===
The 2/9th Bn formed at Willesden Green in September 1914 and was assigned to the 2/1st Middlesex Brigade (later 201st Brigade) in what became the 67th (2nd Home Counties) Division. The battalion was billeted in Staines for training, but the shortage of equipment was so great that the men had to train with .256-in Japanese Ariska rifles.

Late in 1915, 201st Brigade moved to Sevenoaks, later camping at Barham. The 67th Division had dual responsibility as part of the mobile force for Home Defence, and to train drafts for overseas service. Twice it was ordered to prepare for service in Ireland, and in April 1917 it prepared to go to France. However, nothing came of these deployments, and the division was drained of its manpower as its men were drafted to frontline units. The 2/9th Middlesex was disbanded on 14 November 1917 at Patrixbourne in Kent.

=== 3/9th Battalion ===
The 3/9th Bn was formed at Willesden in March 1915, and moved to Cambridge. It was retitled 9th Reserve Bn, Middlesex Regiment, in April 1915. Its role was to train recruits for service with 1st and 2nd Line units. On 1 September 1916, it was absorbed into the 7th Reserve Bn, Middlesex Regiment, at Purfleet.

== Interwar ==
The 9th Battalion Middlesex Regiment reformed when the TF was reconstituted on 7 February 1920. The following year the TF was reorganised as the Territorial Army (TA). The battalion formed part of 132nd (Middlesex and Sussex) Brigade in 44th (Home Counties) Division. For three years from January 1927 the battalion's Regular Army adjutant was Capt Brian Horrocks while he was studying for entry to the Staff College, Camberley.

In the 1930s, the increasing need for anti-aircraft (AA) defence, particularly for London, was addressed by converting a number of infantry battalions to the AA role. The 9th Middlesex became a searchlight unit in 1938, taking the subsidiary title of 60th Searchlight Regiment, consisting of HQ and 429–431 Searchlight Batteries at Willesden.

== World War II ==
90 cm Projector Anti-Aircraft, displayed at Fort Nelson, Portsmouth

=== 60th (Middlesex) Searchlight Regiment ===
==== Mobilisation ====
The TA's AA units were mobilised on 23 September 1938 during the Munich Crisis, with units manning their emergency positions within 24 hours, even though many did not yet have their full complement of men or equipment. The emergency lasted three weeks, and they were stood down on 13 October. In February 1939, the existing AA defences came under the control of a new Anti-Aircraft Command. In June, a partial mobilisation of TA units was begun in a process known as 'couverture', whereby each AA unit did a month's tour of duty in rotation to man selected AA and searchlight positions. On 24 August, ahead of the declaration of war, AA Command was fully mobilised at its war stations. 9th Battalion Middlesex Regiment (60th Searchlight Regiment) formed part of 40th Anti-Aircraft Brigade in 2nd Anti-Aircraft Division, covering the area north of London.

In August 1940, all the TA's AA units became part of the Royal Artillery (RA), the 9th Middlesex becoming 60th (Middlesex) Searchlight Regiment, RA. However, the regiment continued to wear its Middlesex cap badge and buttons, with RA collar badges.

By that time – the height of the Battle of Britain – the regiment had been transferred within 2 AA Division to 41st (London) Anti-Aircraft Brigade, which had special responsibility for defending Royal Air Force airfields in East Anglia.

The regiment supplied a cadre of experienced officers and men to 231st S/L Training Rgt at Blandford Camp where it provided the basis for a new 523 S/L Bty formed on 14 November 1940. This battery later joined 85th S/L Rgt. On 23 January 1942 371 S/L Bty joined 60th S/L Rgt from 43rd (5th Duke of Wellington's Regiment) S/L Rgt.

=== 126th (Middlesex) Light Anti-Aircraft Regiment ===
==== Home Defence ====
On 10 January 1942, the regiment was ordered to convert again, becoming 126th (Middlesex) Light Anti-Aircraft Regiment, RA on 23 February. It comprised 415, 429, 430 and 431 LAA Batteries, and after training at No 8 LAA Practice Camp at Watchet, it returned to 41 AA Bde in May, deploying its 40mm Bofors guns to defend Norwich and the nearby airfield of RAF Horsham St Faith. In September, the regiment was reduced to a three-battery establishment, 431 Bty transferring to a newly raised 144 LAA Regiment.

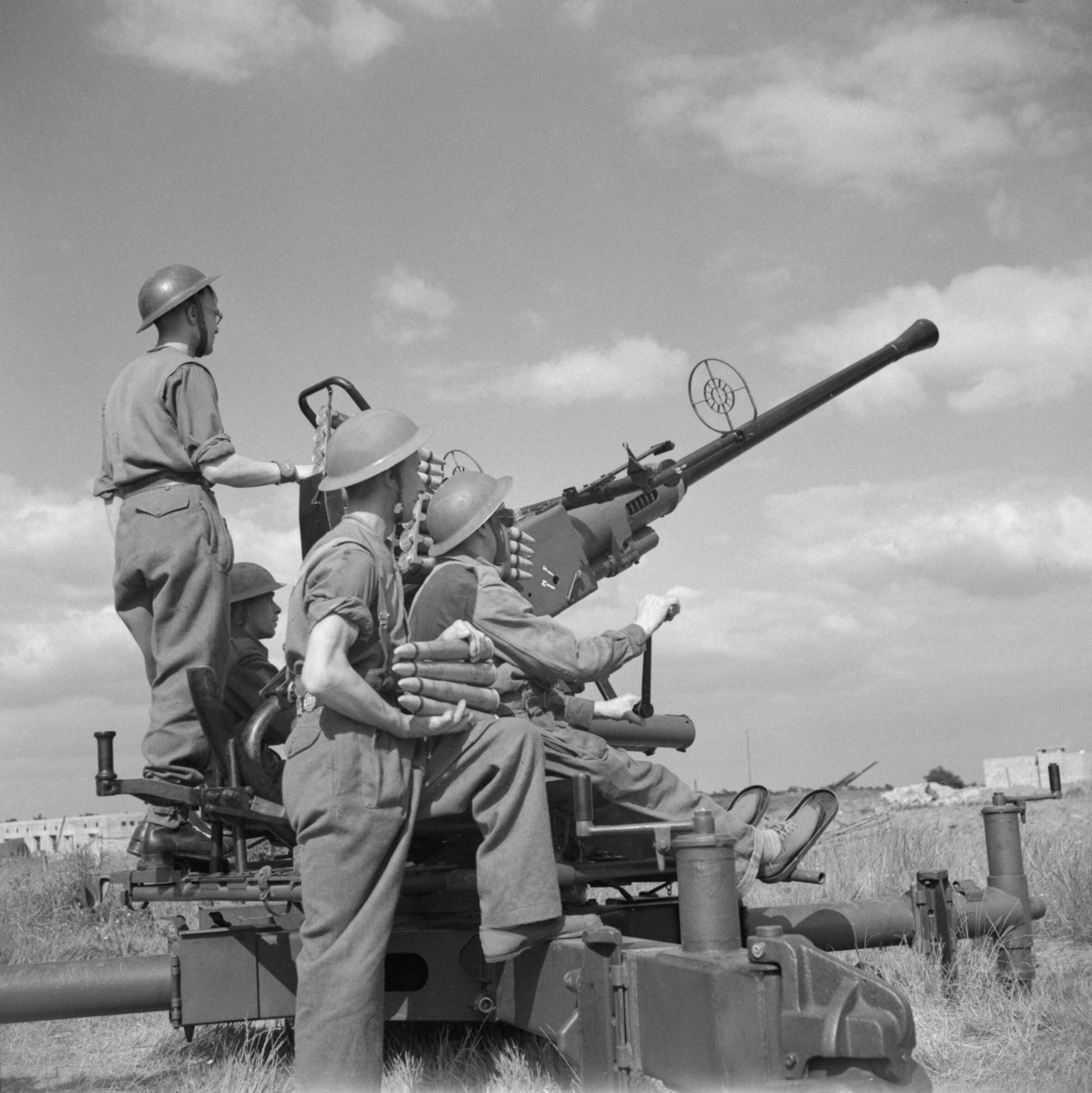
Bofors gun and crew, summer 1944

The regiment continued to serve in Home Forces until 1944, by which time it was at Leicester forming part of 74 AA Bde. In January 1944, it moved to Bournemouth to take over Air Defence of Great Britain commitments around Boscombe, Poole and Swanage. It handed over these commitments in late February and moved to No 11 LAA Training Camp at Stiffkey, followed by deployment exercises in Lincolnshire. In March, the regiment joined Second Army in preparation for Operation Overlord, and in April was deployed to Eastleigh to defend the Overlord concentration areas, engaging night intruder raids.

After the bulk of the invasion force had embarked, 126 Rgt's batteries were trained at Larkhill Camp in engaging unseen ground targets. Ordered to its embarkation marshalling area in August, the regiment was diverted to Pevensey, Hove and Bexhill-on-Sea to engage incoming V-1 flying bombs as part of Operation Diver.

==== North West Europe ====
The regiment finally landed in Normandy on 11–12 October 1944 and served through the campaign in North West Europe as part of 74 AA Bde providing AA cover to 21st Army Group. Initially, it was deployed to Gheel, where it covered the artillery of I Corps (49th (West Riding) Infantry Division, 4th Army Group Royal Artillery (AGRA) and 59th AGRA) in Operation Rebound. Later, it formed part of 'Bob-Force', holding the line of the Turnhout Canal alongside 104th US Infantry Division (the 'Timberwolves'). During this period, it was frequently used to engage enemy sniper and mortar positions with ground fire, as well as firing at V-1s heading for Antwerp.

When the south bank of the Scheldt at Antwerp was cleared, 74 AA Bde, with 126 LAA as its LAA component, was switched round the city to support the advance of II Canadian and I British Corps towards 's-Hertogenbosch. It then took over protection of bridges along the road from the Maas to the Waal captured during Operation Market Garden.

From 15 November 1944, the regiment defended the Nijmegen bridges against air and waterborne attack under command of 74 AA Bde and then of 1st Canadian Infantry Division. On 17 December, after weeks of quiescence, the Luftwaffe made a major effort to support its surprise attack in the Ardennes (the Battle of the Bulge). In 21st Army Group's sector, the Maas and Waal bridges were attacked by waves of Bf 109 and Fw 190 fighter-bombers operating at low level (below radar and HAA), which had to be engaged by LAA guns. Further low-level sweeps followed on 24 December.

The regiment's positions were frequently shelled during the winter. Until the end of March 1945 there were almost daily engagements of single enemy aircraft in the area. During the operations in the Klever Reichswald (Operation Veritable), 126 LAA continued to defend the critical Waal and Maas crossings in support of II Canadian Corps. Improved radar techniques were allowing effective LAA barrages to be fired, driving the attackers back to higher levels into the range of HAA guns. In April, the regiment formed the basis of 'Kenforce' under its CO, Lt-Col W.D. Kenyon, which included a troop of 2 S/L Rgt, a troop of 93 LAA, two companies of Belgian Fusiliers and Royal Navy detachments operating ASDIC to detect underwater attacks on the bridges.

The regiment remained in these positions until cease fire on 3 May 1945. After VE Day, the regiment was engaged in occupation duties under the Canadians until it was placed in suspended animation between 1 February and 9 April 1946.

== Postwar ==
When the TA was reconstituted on 1 January 1947, the regiment was reformed as 595th (9th Battalion Middlesex Regiment) Light Anti-Aircraft Regiment, RA, with its HQ now at Kingsbury, and 873rd Movement Light Battery (The Middlesex Regiment), RA at Staines.

=== 595th LAA/SL Regiment ===
The 595th was redesignated as a Light Anti-Aircraft/Searchlight regiment in 1949. It formed part of 82 AA Bde at Heston.

On 10 March 1955, AA Command was disbanded, and many of its TA regiments were disbanded or reduced. 82 AA Brigade was disbanded and 595 LAA Rgt was amalgamated with two other LAA/SL regiments of the brigade in NW London – 571st (Middlesex) and 604th (Royal Fusiliers) – to form a new regiment: 571st Light Anti-Aircraft Regiment, RA, (9th Battalion, The Middlesex Regiment, Duke of Cambridge's Own), in which the old 595th formed 'Q' Battery. The new unit was in 33rd Anti-Aircraft Brigade.

Finally, on 1 May 1961, the 571st (9th Middlesex) amalgamated with the 7th and 8th Middlesex to form a combined infantry battalion (5th Middlesex), and all links with air defence and the Royal Artillery were severed.

=== 873 M/L Battery ===
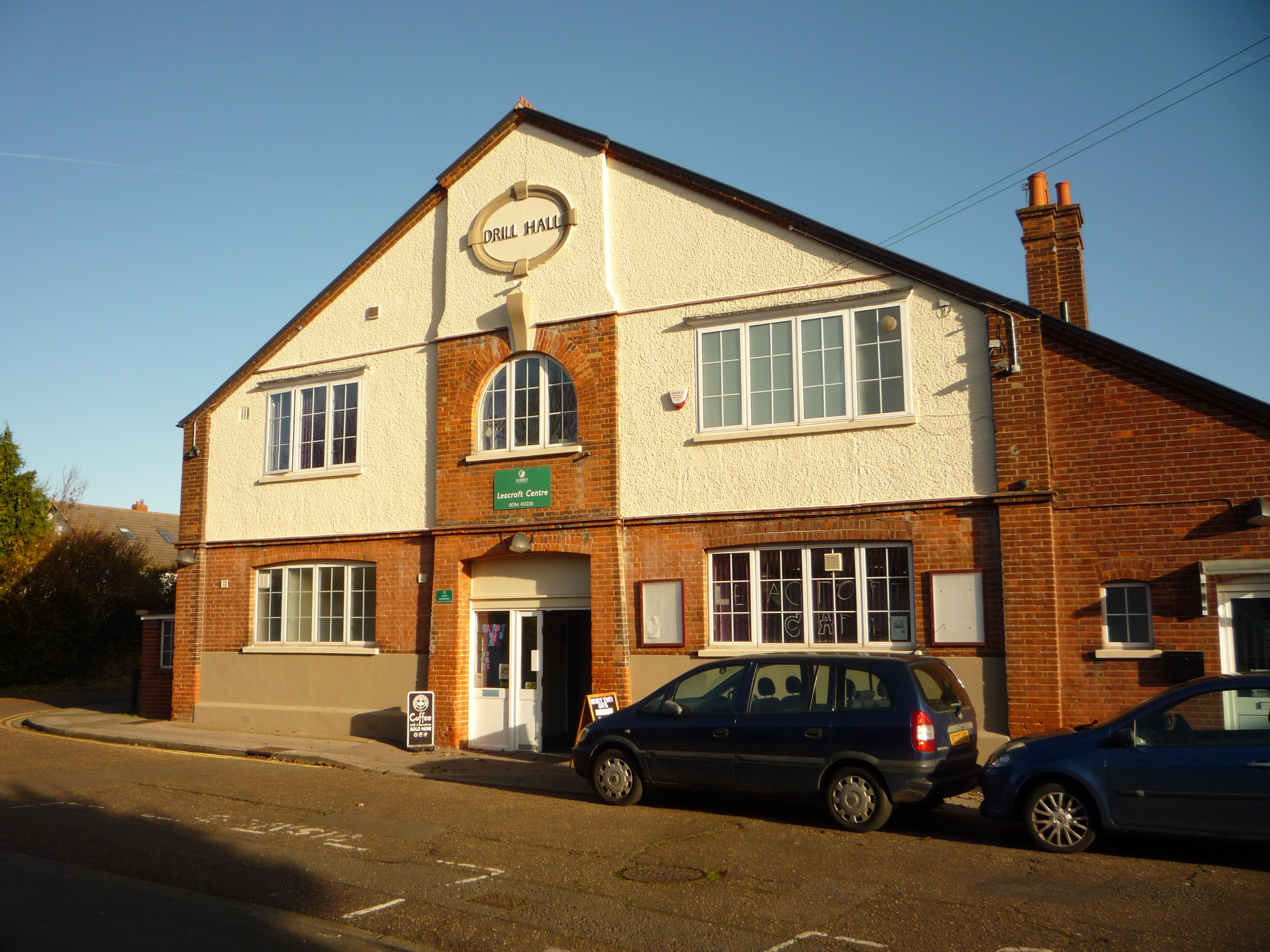
Former TA Drill Hall, Leacroft, Staines

Movement light or 'artificial moonlight' units used searchlights to illuminate ground operations at night. 873 Battery formed at the Drill Hall, Leacroft, Staines, with an establishment of Battery HQ (BHQ) and three troops of eight lights each, with a Royal Electrical and Mechanical Engineers workshop. In 1958, the battery moved to hutted accommodation at Twickenham. Because the sole remaining role of searchlights was ground illumination, the battery was converted from RA to Royal Engineers in 1961 as 873 (Middlesex) Movement Light Squadron under the command of 27 Engineer Brigade.

873 M/L Sqn provided lighting during the construction of the Medway bridges for the M2 motorway in 1962, but its offer to light the rescue efforts after the Aberfan disaster in 1966 was rejected. When the TA was converted into the smaller TAVR in 1967, 873 Sqn was reduced to HQ and one Troop – the only dedicated searchlight unit remaining not only in the British Army but the whole of NATO. The squadron moved to the TA Centre at Horns Lane, Acton, and in 1975 became part of 73 Engineer Regiment. In 1988, it was transferred to 101 (City of London) Engineer Regiment, an Explosive Ordnance Disposal (EOD) unit, and its title was changed to 220 (Searchlight) Field Squadron (EOD), with searchlight operation in addition to normal Sapper duties. The unit moved to the TA Centre at Vicarage Lane, Heston, in 1988, and was disbanded in 1999.

== Insignia ==
On transfer to the RA, the regiment was allowed the privilege of wearing the Middlesex Regiment cap badge and buttons together with RA collar badges. A regimental arm flash was worn during World War II, consisting of a diamond divided vertically in maroon and gold. Postwar, the Middlesex Regiment cap badge was worn on the beret and forage cap with a maroon and gold diamond backing; however, the arm flash was altered from a diamond to a triangle. Officers wore the cap badge in silver with the other ranks' cap badge as their collar badge. In service dress (which was the darker 'Guards' shade of khaki) the officers wore the badges in bronze. They are believed to have worn a maroon and gold lanyard.

The unit's first stand of Regimental colours, presented by HRH Princess Beatrice of Battenburg in 1910 and laid up in 1950, and their replacements presented that year by Lt-Gen Sir Brian Horrocks (the battalion's prewar adjutant), are preserved in the Middlesex Regiment Chapel in St Paul's Cathedral.

== Honorary Colonels ==
The following officers served as Honorary Colonel of the unit:

- Sir Alfred Plantagenet Frederick Charles Somerset of Castle Goring, late 13th Foot, appointed Hon Col of 9th (West Middlesex) RVC 28 April 1871.
- Maj-Gen Sir William Gordon Cameron, CB, VD, appointed Hon Col of 5th (West Middlesex) RVC 20 October 1880.
- Lt-Col W.P. Hewett, TD, CO of the 9th Middlesex in Mesopotamia, appointed Hon Col of 9th Bn Middlesex Regiment 24 March 1937.
- Col G. Beach, CB, OBE, TD, was Hon Col of 126 LAA Regiment in 1942.

== Online sources ==
- British Army units from 1945 on
- British Military History
- The Long, Long Trail
- Orders of Battle at Patriot Files
- The Regimental Warpath 1914–1918
- The Royal Artillery 1939–45
- Stepping Forward London
- Graham Watson, The Territorial Army 1947
- 873 Movement Light Squadron, RE.
