= Ambala Brigade =

- Active: 11 November 1914 – 1941
- Country: British India
- Allegiance: British Crown
- Branch: British Indian Army
- Type: Infantry
- Size: Brigade
- Part of: 3rd Lahore Divisional Area; 16th Indian Division
- Service: First World War; Second World War

The Ambala Brigade was an infantry brigade of the British Indian Army that formed part of the Indian Army during the First World War. It was formed in November 1914 to replace the original Ambala Brigade that had been mobilized as the 3rd (Ambala) Cavalry Brigade for service on the Western Front. It remained in India throughout the war.

The brigade continued to exist between the World Wars and by September 1939 it was designated Ambala Brigade Area. It was broken up in 1941.

== History ==
At the outbreak of the First World War, the Ambala Cavalry Brigade was part of the 3rd (Lahore) Division. It was mobilized in August 1914 as the 3rd (Ambala) Cavalry Brigade, assigned to the newly formed 1st Indian Cavalry Division and sailed from Bombay on 16 October for the Western Front. Likewise, the 3rd (Lahore) Division was transferred to France in August 1914. The 3rd Lahore Divisional Area was formed in September 1914 to take over the area responsibilities of the 3rd (Lahore) Division and on 11 November 1914 (Note: The first commanding officer was appointed on 11 November 1914.) a new Ambala Brigade was formed in 3rd Lahore Divisional Area to replace the original brigade. The brigade served with the division in India until May 1917.

From December 1916, the 16th Indian Division began forming as a reserve division for the North-West Frontier eventually taking over the responsibilities and brigades of the 3rd Lahore Divisional Area: 44th (Ferozepore) Brigade in February 1917 and the Ambala and 45th (Jullundur) Brigades in May. It remained with the new division until June 1918 when it became an independent formation.

The brigade continued to exist after the end of the war. By 1926 it had been redesignated as Ambala Brigade Area. It was broken up in 1941.

== Orders of battle ==
3rd Lahore Divisional Area
The brigade commanded the following units while assigned to 3rd Lahore Divisional Area:
- 1/5th Battalion, Prince Albert's (Somerset Light Infantry) (arrived in India with the 43rd (Wessex) Division and joined the brigade in December 1914; transferred in March 1916 to the 7th Meerut Divisional Area)
- 1st Battalion, 8th Gurkha Rifles (joined in January 1915 from Shillong, 8th (Lucknow) Division; transferred in March 1916 to Mesopotamia where it joined 21st (Bareilly) Brigade, 7th (Meerut) Division)
- 1/4th Battalion, Dorsetshire Regiment (joined in March 1915 from Mhow, 5th (Mhow) Division; transferred in February 1916 to Mesopotamia where it joined the 42nd Indian Brigade, 15th Indian Division)
- 1/6th (Duke of Connaught's Own) Battalion, Hampshire Regiment (joined in March 1916 from Dehra Dun Brigade, 7th Meerut Divisional Area)
- 1/7th Battalion, Hampshire Regiment (joined in March 1916 from Meerut)
- 1/9th Battalion, Duke of Cambridge's Own (Middlesex Regiment) (joined in March 1917 from 43rd Indian Brigade, 16th Indian Division)

16th Indian Division
The brigade commanded the following units while assigned to 16th Indian Division:
- 1/6th (Duke of Connaught's Own) Battalion, Hampshire Regiment (transferred in August 1917 to Mesopotamia where it joined the 52nd Indian Brigade, 17th Indian Division)
- 1/9th Battalion, Duke of Cambridge's Own (Middlesex Regiment) (transferred in November 1917 to the 53rd Indian Brigade, 18th Indian Division)
- 1/7th Battalion, Hampshire Regiment (transferred in January 1918 to the Aden Brigade)
- 1/4th Battalion, Queen's (Royal West Surrey Regiment) (joined in January 1918 from 43rd Indian Brigade; transferred in March to the 45th (Jullundur) Brigade
- 33rd Punjabis (joined in February 1918 from East Africa; transferred in April to 2nd (Rawalpindi) Division)
- 2nd Battalion, 55th Coke's Rifles (Frontier Force) (formed in February 1918; transferred in April to Multan)
- Jind (Imperial Service) Infantry (joined in February 1918 from East Africa)
- 1/9th (Cyclist) Battalion, Hampshire Regiment (joined in February 1918 from 44th (Ferozepore) Brigade)
- 2nd Battalion, 69th Punjabis (formed in May 1918)

Independent formation
The brigade commanded the following units while serving as an independent formation:
- Jind (Imperial Service) Infantry
- 1/9th (Cyclist) Battalion, Hampshire Regiment (transferred in October 1918 to Siberia)
- 2nd Battalion, 69th Punjabis (transferred in August 1918 to Delhi Brigade, 7th Meerut Divisional Area)
- 3rd Battalion, 34th Sikh Pioneers (formed in June 1918)
- 3rd Battalion, 30th Punjabis (formed in June 1918; transferred in August to 44th (Ferozepore) Brigade) (Note: 3rd Battalion, 30th Punjabis was formed in June 1918 as the 1st Battalion, 132nd (Punjab Police) Regiment from a police battalion that had been in existence since 1916. It was renumbered in June 1918.)
- 4th Battalion, 30th Punjabis (formed in June 1918; transferred in December to 44th (Ferozepore) Brigade) (Note: 4th Battalion, 30th Punjabis was formed in June 1918 as the 2nd Battalion, 132nd (Punjab Police) Regiment from a police battalion that had been in existence since 1916. It was renumbered in July 1918.)
- 1st Battalion, 140th Patiala Infantry (formed in July 1918) (Note: 1st Battalion, 140th Patiala Infantry was formed from Patiala State Forces in July 1918.)
- 1/5th Battalion, Hampshire Regiment (joined in October 1918 from Rangoon Brigade, Burma Division)

Ambala Brigade Area on 3 September 1939
At the outbreak of the Second World War, the brigade area had the following units under command:
- 2nd Battalion, East Lancashire Regiment (at Kasauli)
  - Detachments at Ambala and Jutagh
- Detachment, 2nd Battalion, Green Howards (at Solon)
- 3rd Battalion, 14th Punjab Regiment
- 10th Battalion, 15th Punjab Regiment (Note: 10th Battalion, 15th Punjab Regiment was the Training Battalion / Regimental Centre of the 15th Punjab Regiment.)
- Frontier Post, Indian Artillery (at Arawali)
- The Mountain Artillery Training Centre
- The Survey Section (India) (at Kakul)
- 11th Battalion, 15th Punjab Regiment, ITF

== Commanders ==
The Ambala Brigade had the following commanders:

From	To	Rank	Name
11 November 1914	15 October 1915	Brigadier-General	H.A. Iggulden
15 October 1915	2 June 1918	Brigadier-General	C.E. Hendley
3 June 1918	March 1920	Major-General	C.E. Hendley
November 1920	April 1921	Brigadier-General	H.C. Wooldridge
April 1921	October 1921	Brigadier-General	C.H. Rowcroft
	September 1922	Brigadier-General	C.C. Newnham
	December 1923	Brigadier-General	H.J.P. Browne
December 1923	December 1927	Major-General	D. Deane
December 1927	March 1929	Brigadier	E.C. Gepp
April 1929	May 1931	Brigadier	W.E. Wilson-Johnston
May 1931	May 1932	Brigadier	H.L. Scott
May 1932	February 1934	Brigadier	F.G. Gillies
February 1934	February 1938	Brigadier	E.G. Hall
February 1938	1941	Brigadier	C.A.L. Howard

== See also ==
- 3rd (Ambala) Cavalry Brigade for the original brigade

== Bibliography ==
- Gaylor, John (1996). Sons of John Company: The Indian and Pakistan Armies 1903–1991 (2nd ed.). Tunbridge Wells: Parapress. ISBN 1-898594-41-4.
- Kempton, Chris (2003b). 'Loyalty & Honour', The Indian Army September 1939 – August 1947. Vol. Part II Brigades. Milton Keynes: The Military Press. ISBN 0-85420-238-2.
- Mackie, Colin (June 2015). "Army Commands 1900-2011" (PDF). www.gulabin.com. Archived from the original (PDF) on 5 July 2015.
- Nafziger, George (n.d.). "The Indian Army 3 September 1939" (PDF). Fort Leavenworth: Combined Arms Research Library, United States Army Combined Arms Center.
- Perry, F.W. (1993). Order of Battle of Divisions Part 5B. Indian Army Divisions. Newport: Ray Westlake Military Books. ISBN 1-871167-23-X.
