= 53rd Indian Brigade =

- Active: November 1917 – 1921
- Country: British India
- Allegiance: British Crown
- Branch: British Indian Army
- Type: Infantry
- Size: Brigade
- Part of: 18th Indian Division
- Engagements: First World War Mesopotamian Campaign Battle of Sharqat

The 53rd Indian Brigade was an infantry brigade of the British Indian Army that saw active service with the Indian Army during the First World War. It took part in the Mesopotamian campaign and formed part of the occupation force for Iraq post-war.

== History ==
The 53rd Indian Brigade started forming in Mesopotamia from November 1917 as part of the 18th Indian Division, joining the division when it was formed on 24 December 1917. The brigade was formed from battalions transferred directly from India so time was needed for them to become acclimatized. It remained with the division for the rest of the war, taking part in the action at Fat-ha Gorge on the Little Zab (23–26 October 1918) and the Battle of Sharqat (28–30 October 1918).

At the end of the war, the 18th Division was chosen to form part of the occupation force for Iraq. It took part in the Iraq Rebellion in 1920. The division, and the brigade, was broken up in the following year.

== Order of battle ==
The brigade had the following composition in the First World War:

- 1/9th Battalion, Duke of Cambridge's Own (Middlesex Regiment) (joined in November 1917 from Ambala Brigade, 16th Indian Division)
- 1st Battalion, 89th Punjabis (joined in November 1917 from 2nd (Nowshera) Brigade, 1st (Peshawar) Division; left in September 1918 to join the 81st Brigade, British 27th Division)
- 1st Battalion, 3rd Queen Alexandra's Own Gurkha Rifles (joined in December 1917 from Kohat)
- 1st Battalion, 7th Gurkha Rifles (joined in December 1917 from the East Persia Cordon where it had been serving as part of the 4th (Quetta) Division)
- 207th Machine Gun Company
- 53rd Light Trench Mortar Battery (joined in February 1918)

== Commander ==
The brigade was commanded from 19 November 1917 by Brigadier-General G.A.F. Sanders.

== Bibliography ==
- Perry, F.W. (1993). Order of Battle of Divisions Part 5B. Indian Army Divisions. Newport: Ray Westlake Military Books. ISBN 1-871167-23-X.
