= Kent Cyclist Battalion =

British Territorial Army unit

- Active: 1 April 1908 – February 1920
- Country: United Kingdom
- Allegiance: British Crown
- Branch: British Army
- Type: Infantry
- Size: Up to three battalions
- Part of: Eastern Command (peacetime); 16th Indian Division (Third Anglo-Afghan War)
- Garrison/HQ: Corn Exchange, Tonbridge, Kent
- Engagements: First World War N.W. Frontier, India 1917 Baluchistan 1918 Third Anglo-Afghan War

The Kent Cyclist Battalion was a bicycle infantry battalion of the Territorial Force, part of the British Army. Formed in 1908, it was sent to India in the First World War and saw active service during the Third Anglo-Afghan War in 1919. In 1920, it was converted as part of the Royal Artillery.

== History ==
=== Formation ===
The battalion was newly raised at Tonbridge on 1 April 1908 as a bicycle infantry battalion of the British Army's Territorial Force. Initially designated as the 6th (Cyclist) Battalion, Queen's Own (Royal West Kent Regiment), in 1910 it was separated from the regiment and redesignated as the independent Kent Cyclist Battalion so as to encourage recruitment from the eastern part of the county. (Note: Kent was relatively unusual in having two county infantry regiments, the other one being the Buffs (East Kent Regiment).)

In August 1914, the battalion was Headquartered at the Corn Exchange in Tonbridge and had the following companies:

- A Company - Bromley
- B Company - Tonbridge including Pembury Troop
- C Company - Beckenham
- D Company - Maidstone including Chatham Troop
- E Company - Tunbridge Wells
- F Company - Canterbury including Ashford and Whitstable Troops
- G Company - Ramsgate including Margate and Sandwich Troops
- H Company - Sandgate including Hythe, Dover and Folkestone Troops

At the outbreak of the First World War, the battalion was in Eastern Command, unattached to any higher formation. It was to be used as mobile infantry, and for work on signals, scouting and similar activities.

=== First World War ===
In accordance with the Territorial and Reserve Forces Act 1907 (7 Edw. 7, c.9) which brought the Territorial Force into being, the TF was intended to be a home defence force for service during wartime and members could not be compelled to serve outside the country. However, on the outbreak of war on 4 August 1914, many members volunteered for Imperial Service. Therefore, TF units were split in August and September 1914 into 1st Line (liable for overseas service) and 2nd Line (home service for those unable or unwilling to serve overseas) units. Later, 3rd Line units were formed to act as reserves, providing trained replacements for the 1st and 2nd Lines.

==== 1/1st Kent Cyclist Battalion ====
The battalion was mobilized on 4 August 1914 at the outbreak of the First World War and moved to its war station at Canterbury. During 1915 it served on coast defences between Swale and Rye – with a detachment in the Medway Defences – attached to the 57th (2nd West Lancashire) Division. On 24 November 1915, it concentrated at Canterbury. On 2 December 1915, it left 57th (2nd West Lancashire) Division and moved to Chiseldon (near Swindon, Wiltshire).

It was joined at Chiseldon by three more cyclist battalions: the 2/6th (Cyclist) Battalion, Royal Sussex Regiment, the 1/9th (Cyclist) Battalion, Hampshire Regiment and the 1/25th (Cyclist) Battalion, London Regiment. They were converted to infantry (Note: From this time the battalion dropped "Cyclist" from its title.) and formed a brigade, originally intended for service in East Africa. Instead, they sailed for India on 8 February 1916.

The battalion landed at Bombay on 3 March 1916 and was assigned to Southern Brigade, 9th (Secunderabad) Division at Bangalore. In December it was transferred to 44th (Ferozepore) Brigade, 3rd Lahore Divisional Area and in February 1917 it moved with the brigade to 16th Indian Division. Between 4 March and 15 April it served with the brigade in the South Waziristan Field Force; it was then at Dalhousie with Bannu Brigade (April to July 1917). It served with the North Waziristan Field Force from 30 May to 18 August, rejoining 44th (Ferozepore) Brigade in July. It earned its first battle honour – N.W. Frontier, India 1917 – for these operations.

It returned to Dalhousie on 25 August where it remained until mobilizing for Baluchistan on 5 March 1918. Still with 44th (Ferozepore) Brigade, it served in Baluchistan between 11 March and 1 May 1918, before returning to Dalhousie once again. It earned its second battle honour – Baluchistan 1918 – for this operation.

It helped to quell riots in the Punjab between 12 and 27 April 1919. Between 19 May and 17 August 1919 it took part in the Third Anglo-Afghan War as part of 44th (Ferozepore) Brigade, 16th Indian Division in the Peshawar area. It earned its third and final battle honour – Afghanistan 1919 – for its actions in the war.

The battalion was posted to Dagshai from 21 August to 3 November before sailing for England on 8 November 1919. It landed at Plymouth on 6 December 1919 and was then demobilized. It became Kent Cyclist Battalion once again before being disembodied in February 1920.

==== 2/1st Kent Cyclist Battalion ====
The 2nd Line battalion was formed at Canterbury in 1914 or 1915; it remained in England throughout the war. In 1916 it was still at Canterbury. By September 1916, the battalion had joined the 6th Cyclist Brigade (former 15th Mounted Brigade) in the 2nd Cyclist Division. The brigade was headquartered at Wingham, Kent. The division was broken up on 16 November 1916 and the battalion was transferred to 5th Cyclist Brigade (former 9th Mounted Brigade) in the new 1st Mounted Division at Ramsgate. By May 1917, it was attached to 67th (2nd Home Counties) Division and was at Folkestone from May to August 1917.

In March 1918, the battalion returned to The Cyclist Division where it remained until the end of the war. It was at Lydd from August 1918 and in November 1918 was at Folkestone. The battalion was disbanded on 28 July 1919.

On 4 July 1915, the battalion provided personnel for the 9th Provisional Cyclist Company. The company was disbanded at Margate on 13 April 1916.

==== 3/1st Kent Cyclist Battalion ====
The 3rd Line battalion was formed at Canterbury in 1915 to provide trained replacements for the 1st and 2nd Line battalions. It may have been disbanded in 1915 or 1916. (Note: The other three 3rd Line cyclist battalions without a parent infantry regiment – 3/1st Northern Cyclist Battalion, 3/1st Highland Cyclist Battalion, and 3/1st Huntingdonshire Cyclist Battalion – were all disbanded in March 1916 with personnel posted to their respective 1st and 2nd Lines or to the Machine Gun Corps.)

=== Post war ===
The Territorial Force was disbanded after the First World War, although this was a formality and it was reformed in 1920. From 1 October 1921 it was renamed as the Territorial Army.

One major change with the new Territorial Army had an effect on the number of infantry battalions. The original 14 divisions were reformed with the pre-war standard of three brigades of four battalions each, for a total of 168 battalions. Infantry were no longer to be included as Army Troops or part of the Coastal Defence Forces so the pre-war total of 208 battalions had to be reduced by 40. This was achieved by either converting certain battalions to other roles, usually artillery or engineers, or by amalgamating pairs of battalions within a regiment. In particular, based on war time experience, the Army decided to dispense with cyclists units and the existing battalions were either disbanded or converted to artillery or signals units.

The Kent Cyclists were reformed at Bromley as a medium artillery battery of the Royal Garrison Artillery (RGA) on 7 February 1920 as 208th (Bromley) Battery. It joined the former 4th Home Counties Brigade, Royal Field Artillery and former Home Counties (Kent) Heavy Battery, RGA) in 13th (Kent) Medium Brigade, RGA, soon redesignated as 52nd (Kent) Medium Brigade, Royal Garrison Artillery. (Note: The basic organic unit of the Royal Artillery was, and is, the Battery. When grouped together they formed brigades, in the same way that infantry battalions or cavalry regiments were grouped together in brigades. At the outbreak of the First World War, a field artillery brigade of headquarters (4 officers, 37 other ranks), three batteries (5 and 193 each), and a brigade ammunition column (4 and 154) had a total strength just under 800 so was broadly comparable to an infantry battalion (just over 1,000) or a cavalry regiment (about 550). Like an infantry battalion, an artillery brigade was usually commanded by a Lieutenant-Colonel. Artillery brigades were redesignated as regiments in 1938.)

== Battle honours ==
The Kent Cyclist Battalion was awarded the following battle honours:

N.W. Frontier, India 1917
Baluchistan 1918
Afghanistan 1919

It was the only cyclist battalion to be awarded battle honours.

== Honorary Colonel ==
- 1909–1921: Brevet Colonel Sir Henry Streatfield

== See also ==
- Army Cyclist Corps

== Bibliography ==
- Becke, Archibald F. (1936). Order of Battle of Divisions Part 2A. The Territorial Force Mounted Divisions and the 1st-Line Territorial Force Divisions (42–56). London: HMSO. OCLC 4405016.
- Becke, Archibald F. (1937). Order of Battle of Divisions Part 2B. The 2nd-Line Territorial Force Divisions (57th–69th) with The Home-Service Divisions (71st–73rd) and 74th and 75th Divisions. London: HMSO. OCLC 4405016.
- Frederick, J.B.M. (1984). Lineage Book of British Land Forces 1660–1978. Wakefield, Yorkshire: Microform Academic Publishers. ISBN 1-85117-009-X.
- James, Brigadier E.A. (1978). British Regiments 1914–18. London: Samson Books Limited. ISBN 0-906304-03-2.
- Perry, F.W. (1993). Order of Battle of Divisions Part 5B. Indian Army Divisions. Newport: Ray Westlake Military Books. ISBN 1-871167-23-X.
- Rinaldi, Richard A (2008). Order of Battle of the British Army 1914. Ravi Rikhye. ISBN 978-0-97760728-0.
- Westlake, Ray (1986). The Territorial Battalions, A Pictorial History, 1859–1985. Tunbridge Wells: Spellmount.
