= 1st Sussex Rifle Volunteers =

1st Sussex Rifle Volunteers 1st Volunteer Bn, Royal Sussex Regiment 6th (Cyclist) Bn, Royal Sussex Regiment
- Active: 23 November 1859–29 December 1919
- Country: United Kingdom
- Branch: Volunteer Force/Territorial Force
- Role: Infantry; Bicycle infantry
- Size: 1–3 Battalions
- Garrison/HQ: Brighton
- Engagements: Second Boer War; Waziristan

The 1st Sussex Rifle Volunteers was a part-time unit of the British Army first raised from the county of Sussex in 1859. It later became the 6th (Cyclist) Battalion of the Royal Sussex Regiment. During World War I it served in home defence in Britain and Ireland, while its 2nd Line battalion served in India and Waziristan. It was not reformed after the war.

== Volunteer Force ==
An invasion scare in 1859 led to the emergence of the Volunteer Movement, and Rifle Volunteer Corps (RVCs) began to be organised throughout Great Britain. The 1st Sussex RVC was formed as two companies at Brighton on 23 November 1859, with Captains R. Moorsom (formerly of the Scots Fusilier Guards) and John Stuart Roupell as the company commanders. From April 1860 it was included in the 3rd Administrative Battalion of Sussex RVCs, but having attained a strength of six companies it became an independent unit in July 1863.

Under the 'Localisation of the Forces' scheme introduced by the Cardwell Reforms of 1872, Volunteers were brigaded with their local Regular and Militia battalions. This was in Sub-District No 43 in South Eastern District for the 1st Sussex RVC, grouped with the 35th (Royal Sussex) and 107th Regiments of Foot, the Royal Sussex Light Infantry Militia and the 1st Cinque Ports and 1st Sussex Admin Battalions of RVCs.

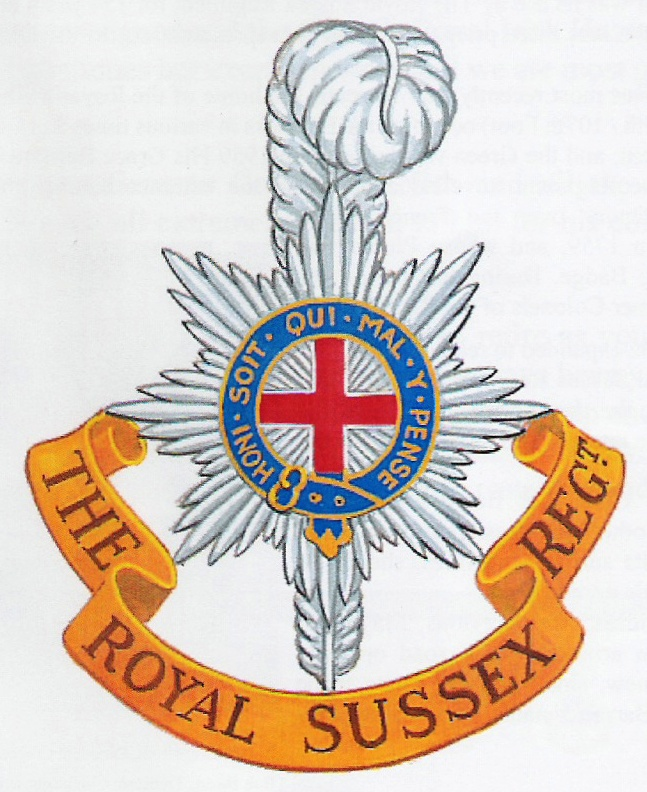
Badge of the Royal Sussex Regiment.

The Childers Reforms of 1881 took Cardwell's reforms further, the linked battalions becoming county regiments to which the Volunteers were formally affiliated. The 35th and 107th became the Royal Sussex Regiment on 1 July 1881, the 1st Sussex RVC becoming its 1st Volunteer Battalion (VB), but without changing its title.

The late Victorian era saw a craze for cycling and the Volunteer Force took a leading role in developing the new Safety bicycle for military use. In April 1885 the 1st Sussex RVC was the first to raise a scout section using bicycles. The battalion raised its seventh and eighth companies in 1886, and officially changed its name to 1st Volunteer Battalion, Royal Sussex Regiment in February 1887.

While Cardwell's sub-districts were often referred to as 'brigades', they were purely administrative organisations and the Volunteers were excluded from the 'mobilisation' part of the scheme. The Stanhope Memorandum of December 1888 proposed a more comprehensive Mobilisation Scheme for Volunteer units, which would assemble in their own brigades at key points in case of war. In peacetime these brigades provided a structure for collective training. Under this scheme the 1st Sussex formed part of the Dover Brigade, later entitled the South Eastern Brigade, before the Royal Sussex VBs formed their own Sussex Brigade at the end of the 1890s. This became the Sussex and Kent Brigade in the early 1900s.

=== Second Boer War ===
After Black Week in December 1899, the Volunteers were invited to send active service units to assist the Regulars in the Second Boer War. The War Office decided that one company 116 strong could be recruited from the volunteer battalions of any infantry regiment that had a regular battalion serving in South Africa. The Royal Sussex's VBs accordingly raised a service company that joined the 1st Battalion, replaced by a second contingent after a year, and earned the volunteer battalions their first Battle honour: South Africa 1900–02.

There was a general expansion of the Volunteers in 1900, and the 1st VB raised a ninth company. In addition, three school Cadet Corps were affiliated to the battalion: Brighton College in 1900, Christ's Hospital in 1904 and Cottesmore School (later Brighton College Preparatory School) in 1905.

== Territorial Force ==
When the Volunteers were subsumed into the new Territorial Force (TF) under the Haldane Reforms of 1908, it was proposed that the 1st Volunteer Bn should be converted into the 2nd Home Counties Brigade, Royal Field Artillery, and an Army Service Corps company. However, the battalion's officers refused this unpopular conversion and were placed on the Unattached List; the artillery brigade was then organised from existing artillery volunteers. Brighton College and Christ's Hospital cadet corps joined the Officers' Training Corps and Brighton Prep School was affiliated to the 4th Bn Sussex Regiment.

What remained of the battalion was then converted on 21 November 1911 into the 6th (Cyclist) Battalion, Royal Sussex, consisting of headquarters (HQ) and A-H Companies. Lieutenant-Colonel Cecil Clarke, VD, commanding officer (CO) of the 1st Sussex VB since 18 January 1899, was confirmed in command of this successor unit. A regular officer, Captain B.M. Hynes of the Royal Sussex, was appointed adjutant to assist in raising the new battalion. Its drill hall was at 18 Montpelier Place in Brighton.

The cyclist battalions were not included in the TF's main divisional structure but were instead given the role of using their mobility to defend vulnerable sectors of the coastline and to maintain communications between the static defence units. The 6th Bn Royal Sussex fulfilled this role in Eastern Command.

== World War I ==
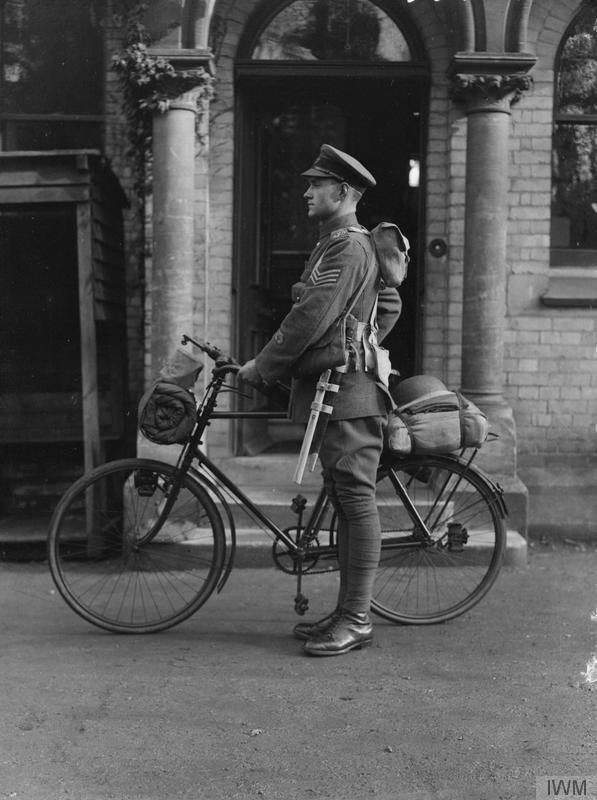
British Army cyclist in marching order, 1914–18.

=== Mobilisation ===
The battalion mobilised at Brighton on the outbreak of war on 4 August 1914, still under the command of Lt-Col Cecil Clarke. Shortly afterwards, TF units were invited to volunteer for Overseas Service. On 31 August, the formation of a reserve or 2nd Line unit was authorised for each 1st Line unit where 60 per cent or more of the men had volunteered for Overseas Service. The titles of these 2nd Line units would be the same as the original, but distinguished by a '2/' prefix. In this way duplicate battalions, brigades and divisions were created, mirroring those TF formations being sent overseas. Later 3rd Line units were created to train reinforcements for the 1st and 2nd lines.

=== 1/6th (Cyclist) Battalion, Royal Sussex ===
From August 1914 to the end of 1915 the battalion served in coast defence in Norfolk as 'Army Troops' attached to the 1st Mounted Division, with battalion HQ at Holt. During this period the cyclist battalions with 1st Mtd Division operated as dispersed companies. In line with their pre-war training they prepared all the important road and rail bridges for demolition to impede an invading force, manned coastal lookout stations, and mounted guards on important infrastructure locations such as ports and oil tanks. In the prevailing mood of 'spy fever' they were also alert for possible espionage. On 14 July 1915 the battalion's remaining Home Service men were sent to join the 9th Provisional Brigade (see below).

In July 1916 the Yeomanry of the 1st Mtd Division were converted to cyclists and the original cyclist battalions ceased to be attached. 1/6th Royal Sussex moved to St Leonards-on-Sea on the South Coast as part of the General Reserve. By March 1917 it was at Folkestone. In July 1917 it was at Wingham, Kent, attached to the reformed 1st Mtd Division.

Early in 1918 the battalion was sent to Tralee in Ireland, where it was attached to the 6th Cyclist Brigade. By August it was at Limerick, where it remained until the end of the war.

=== 2/6th (Cyclist) Battalion, Royal Sussex ===
The 2/6th (Cyclist) Battalion, Royal Sussex, was mobilised at Brighton on 26 October 1914 under the temporary command of Maj C.V. Johnson. It moved to its war station at Southwold, Suffolk, on 12 March 1915 and deployed in the Centre Sub Section, Coast Defences, with one company detached at Dunwich, one at Wrentham and one at Southwold Fish Market. It was attached to 1st Mounted Division for operations, coordinating with the infantry of 2nd Welsh Border Brigade, 2nd Welsh Division. The battalion began a routine of training, trench digging, and road and railway patrols.

On the night of 15/16 April Zeppelin L5 bombed Southwold and a patrol from the battalion opened fire on what they thought was spies signalling to it. Thereafter patrols frequently investigated reports of suspicious lights during a period of spy fever and occasional air raids. Many 2nd Line TF units had to make do with .256-in Japanese Ariska rifles; when the battalion received its Lee-Enfields in June they were a mixture of Long and Short models and carbines, in poor condition. The battalion then went through a series of rapid changes, coming under First Army, Central Force, in May, then 2/1st London Division in June. On 1 July it moved from Southwold to Norfolk, first at Norwich, with HQ later at Stalham, and finally at Potter Heigham. It formally came under 2nd Welsh Division (redesignated 68th (2nd Welsh) Division the following month) and manned No 3 Section Norfolk Coast Defences, with detachments at Winterton-on-Sea, Stalham, and Sea Palling. Once again responsibilities were split, with the battalion coming under North Midland Mounted Brigade for operations. By November the battalion was attached to 1st Mtd Division again. It had relatively few home service or unfit men who had to be transferred to the provisional company (see below) but about 60 Canadians and Rhodesians had been recruited into the battalion, and in July 1915 they were transferred to the Canadian Expeditionary Force, being replaced by a draft from the 3/6th Bn.

In November 1915 the 2/6th Royal Sussex under Lt-Col F.W. Johnson, DSO, was sent to Chiseldon in Wiltshire where it was brigaded with three other cyclist battalions (1/9th Hampshire Regiment, 1/25th London and 1/1st Kent) and converted to infantry, dropping 'Cyclist' from their titles. The battalions were reinforced and reorganised on the infantry's four-company system, and there was a period of intensive training. The brigade was intended as reinforcements for the East African Campaign, and tropical uniforms and foreign service helmets were issued, while stores were marked '4th East African Brigade'. However, these were withdrawn before the end of the year. The brigade was then mobilised for the Sinai and Palestine Campaign, but instead was shipped to India. 2/6th Royal Sussex, with Capt Hynes promoted to major as battalion second-in-command, embarked on the White Star liner Ceramic at Devonport, and landed at Bombay on 25 February 1916. The brigade assembled at Bangalore (at the time it was the only all-English brigade east of Suez) and resumed training.

==== India ====
2/6th Sussex were stationed at Cornwallis Barracks in Bangalore, two companies later exchanging with two companies from 1/1st Kents at Hebbal Camp outside the city. At the beginning of December 1916 the brigade entrained for a six-day journey to a camp at Burhan, north of Rawalpindi. Here it was broken up and its individual units joined different brigades of 16th Indian Division, which was being assembled there. 2/6th Royal Sussex and 1/1st Kents joined 44th (Ferozepore) Brigade in February 1917. The division began training for mountain warfare on the North-West Frontier. However, training was abruptly stopped on 4 March when 44th Bde was sent to join a field force in South Waziristan.

==== Waziristan 1917 ====
The South Waziristan Field Force was mobilised at Tank, to carry out a punitive expedition against the Mahsud tribe who had ambushed and killed many of a force of the South Waziristan Militia at Serwekai. 2/6th Sussex entrained for Darya Khan on 5 March, marching into Dera Ismail Khan on 7 March where it organised camels and mules for the battalion transport. It reached Tank on 9 March, and 44th Bde moved out to Jatta three days later. Here the brigade formed an entrenched camp with 2/6th Sussex deployed along the perimeter with outlying picquets and Lewis gun posts, though large numbers of the men were sick. It also escorted supply convoys and carried out sweeps through the surrounding area. The South Waziristan Field Force operated until 15 April. Major Hynes had been promoted from second-in-command of the battalion to command 1/25th Londons on 24 March 1917.

Next the North Waziristan Militia were attacked and the force was reorganised at Tank as the North Waziristan Field Force, with 2/6th Royal Sussex moving to 45th (Jullundur) Brigade in May. The force began its advance in June. 2/6th Royal Sussex and 45th Bde moved on the second night, 7/8 June, over appalling tracks past Zam Fort as the force closed up to Jandola. Here the force was subjected to night sniping, and the daytime picquets going out and coming back exchanged fire with tribesmen. But when the brigade advanced again the passage of the Shahur Tangi Pass was unopposed, the 2/6th Royal Sussex reaching the fortified camp beyond on 16 June. The next 6 miles (9.7 km) march to Barwand entailed the heaviest fighting of the campaign, and picquets on the hills had to fight their way into position and then fight to hold them, sometimes through the night. A further 3 miles (4.8 km) advance was then made on 20 June to secure water supplies. The tribesmen made a determined stand on the Ispana Raghra plateau before the force was able to camp there. Next day 45th Bde was sent to destroy the village of Nanu at the head of the Splitoi valley, with 2/6th Sussex suffering one killed and 11 wounded in seizing the heights and then acting as the rearguard. On 23 June 45th Bde cleared a very difficult defile to allow the Striking Force to advance, 2/6th Sussex suffering more casualties. Next day the battalion provided the reserve and covering force for another sweep into the Khaisora Valley. On 25 June the Mahsuds offered to negotiate for peace, and a treaty was signed on 12 July. The force then withdrew down the valley as far as Manzal, where a semi-permanent camp was erected. There was still a month of hard duty, picquetting the heights and escorting supply convoys up the Shahur Tangi pass, while many sick had to be transported down to the nearest hospital, five days' march away. Once the peace conditions were completed, the field force withdrew by stages through Jandola and Zam to Tank, with 2/6th Sussex having to provide picquets and road repair parties. On 20 August the battalion entrained at Tank.

For many of the men in the field force, there as a long period of convalescence before they were fit for further service. In 81 days' campaigning 2/6th Sussex had lost 8 men killed or died of disease, 18 evacuated wounded and 415 evacuated sick. The division was reorganised and 2/6th Royal Sussex moved to 43rd Indian Brigade in August. In March 1918 2/6th Royal Sussex went to Lahore, which was within the division's area of responsibility, and remained there throughout the year.

==== Waziristan 1919 ====
Although World War I had ended in November 1918, 2/6th Royal Sussex was still stationed on the North-West Frontier when 16th Indian Division was mobilised in May 1919 on the outbreak of the Third Anglo-Afghan War. 44th and 45th Brigades were immediately sent up to Peshawar and took part in the campaign, but 43rd Bde went back to Waziristan where the Afghan war had rekindled trouble. The brigade's arrival at Bannu from 30 May transformed the situation, enabling relief columns to lift the sieges of some militia posts. However, 2/6th Royal Sussex had left for the UK by the time the Waziristan campaign 1919–1920 got under way in November 1919.

=== 3/6th (Cyclist) Battalion, Royal Sussex ===
The role of 3rd Line battalions was to provide drafts for the 1st or 2nd Line battalions serving overseas; most had been formed early in 1915, but 2/6th Royal Sussex did not leave until February 1916. The 3/6th (Cyclist) Battalion, Royal Sussex, was then formed during 1916 at Purfleet in Essex. The battalion only had a short existence: on 1 September 1916 it was absorbed into 4th (Reserve) Battalion, which combined the 3rd Lines of the 4th, 5th and 6th Bns Royal Sussex.

=== 9th Provisional Cyclist Company ===
From May 1915 the remaining Home Service men of the TF were withdrawn from their units and formed into brigades of coast defence battalions, termed Provisional Battalions from June. The home service details of 1/6th Royal Sussex were withdrawn on 4 July, and on 8 September the 113 men were ordered to join two platoons (64 men) from 1/1st and 2/1st Kent Cyclist Battalions to form 9th Provisional Cyclist Company at Herne Bay, Kent, under the command of Capt H. Ewell of 1/6th Royal Sussex. This was the cyclist unit for 9th Provisional Brigade, whose infantry battalions were mainly from Lancashire. The company was temporarily attached to 42nd Provisional Battalion. Its men had been engaged in coast patrol work and were considered untrained in infantry duties. Some sources report that the company was disbanded on 13 April 1916 at Margate, but when 9th Provisional Bde was expanded to form 73rd Division in November 1916, it formed 73rd Divisional Cyclist Company, Army Cyclist Corps (Home Service). That unit was disbanded by 1 April 1918.

== Disbandment ==
The remaining units of 6th (Cyclist) Battalion, Royal Sussex Regiment were disbanded at Brighton at the end of 1919, the 2/6th Bn on 15 December and the 1/6th Bn on 29 December. The battalion was not reformed when the TF was reconstituted the following year.

A new 6th Battalion, Royal Sussex, was formed in May 1939 as a duplicate of the 4th Battalion.

== Honorary colonels ==
The following served as honorary colonel of the unit:

- R. Moorsom, founding captain, appointed 17 October 1863
- Maj-Gen Earl De La Warr, appointed 22 April 1867, died 23 April 1873
- Henry Penton, former CO, appointed 3 May 1879
- H. Verrall, VD, former CO, appointed 24 May 1884

== See also ==
- Royal Sussex Regiment
- Army Cyclist Corps
