= World War I order of battle: Indian Army =

Structure of the Indian Army during World War I

Indian Army during World War I order of battle

see Indian Army during World War I for further details on campaigns and structure

== India based formations ==
=== North West Frontier ===
- 1st (Peshawar) Division
- 2nd (Rawalpindi) Division
- 3rd Lahore Divisional Area
- 4th (Quetta) Division
- 7th Meerut Divisional Area
- 16th Indian Division
- Bannu Brigade
- Derajat Brigade
- Kohat Brigade

=== Southern India ===
Internal Security and training

- 5th (Mhow) Division
- 6th Poona Divisional Area
- 8th (Lucknow) Division
- 9th (Secunderabad) Division

=== Other locations ===
On internal security or as a guard force

- Burma Division
- Aden Brigade
- South Persia Brigade

== Indian Expeditionary Forces ==
=== Indian Expeditionary Force A ===
Western Front

- Indian Cavalry Corps
  - 1st Indian Cavalry Division (in 1916 renamed 4th Cavalry Division)
  - 2nd Indian Cavalry Division (in 1916 renamed 5th Cavalry Division)
- Indian Corps
  - 3rd (Lahore) Division (redeployed to Mesopotamia in 1915)
  - 7th (Meerut) Division (redeployed to Mesopotamia in 1915)

=== Indian Expeditionary Force B ===
East Africa Campaign

- 27th (Bangalore) Brigade
- Imperial Service Infantry Brigade

=== Indian Expeditionary Force C ===
East Africa Campaign

- 29th Punjabis and half battalions from the Princely states of
  - Jind
  - Bharatpur
  - Kapurthala
  - Rampur
- 15 pounder artillery battery
- 10 pounder mountain artillery battery
- Maxim gun battery
- Field Ambulance

=== Indian Expeditionary Force D ===
Mesopotamia Campaign

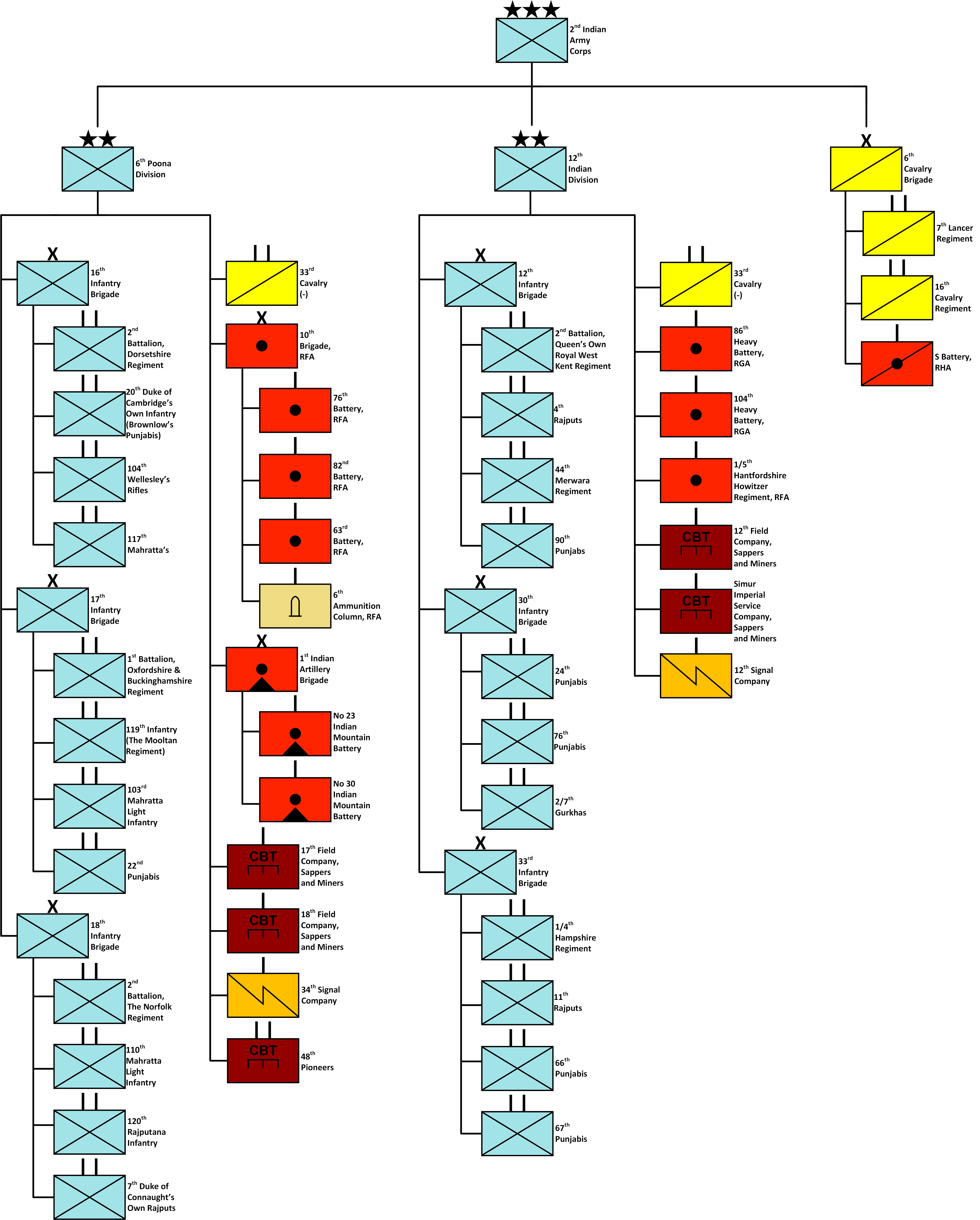
British Indian Army Expeditionary Force D as organized 1 April 1915

- Cavalry Division
- 3rd (Lahore) Division
- 6th (Poona) Division
- 7th (Meerut) Division
- 12th Indian Division
- 14th Indian Division
- 15th Indian Division
- 17th Indian Division
- 18th Indian Division

=== Indian Expeditionary Force E ===
Sinai and Palestine Campaign

- 4th Cavalry Division
- 5th Cavalry Division
- 3rd (Lahore) Division
- 7th (Meerut) Division

=== Indian Expeditionary Force F ===
Suez Canal

- 10th Indian Division
- 11th Indian Division
- 22nd (Lucknow) Brigade

=== Indian Expeditionary Force G ===
Gallipoli Campaign

- 29th Brigade

== Bibliography ==
- Sumner, Ian (2001). The Indian Army 1914–1947. Oxford: Osprey Publishing. ISBN 1-84176-196-6.
