= A. M. S. Elsmie =

British Indian Army general (1869–1958)

Major-General Alexander Montagu Spears Elsmie CB CMG (2 November 1869 – 12 November 1958) was a British Indian Army officer.

== Early life and career ==
Elsmie was the second son of George Robert Elsmie, administrator in India and author, and his wife Elizabeth (née Spears). He was educated at Clifton College and the Royal Military College, Sandhurst, from which he was commissioned second lieutenant in the Border Regiment in January 1889.

== Indian Army ==
In May 1890 he transferred to the Indian Army and joined the 2nd Punjab Infantry (later the 56th Punjabi Rifles). He was promoted lieutenant in July 1891. He served in the Miranzai expeditions in 1891, the Waziristan campaign in 1894–1895, and on the North-West Frontier in 1897–1898, for which he was twice mentioned in despatches while serving as regimental adjutant, a position he had held since October 1896. He later served with the Tirah Field Force. He was promoted captain in January 1900 and attended the Staff College, Camberley in England in 1902.

In January 1907, he was promoted major and appointed brigade major at Jullundur and the following year he became a Deputy Assistant Quartermaster-General (DAQMG) at the Indian Army's headquarters at Simla, serving in the Intelligence Branch of the Military Operations Directorate.

In September 1909 he was appointed a professor at the Indian Staff College at Quetta, where he served until 1911, with the temporary rank of lieutenant-colonel. He returned to regimental duty in January 1912 and in December 1912 he was promoted brevet lieutenant-colonel and the following year he took command of his regiment. In September 1913 he was promoted substantive lieutenant-colonel.

== First World War ==
On the outbreak of the First World War in 1914 he took the regiment to Egypt and then Aden, where he commanded the 28th Indian Brigade with the temporary rank of brigadier-general. He was appointed Companion of the Order of St Michael and St George (CMG) in 1915 and was promoted brevet colonel in December 1916. In 1916 the brigade moved to Mesopotamia. He was severely wounded in the thigh in July 1916 and mentioned in despatches four times.

== Post-war service ==
At the beginning of 1918 he returned to India as temporary brigadier-general commanding the brigade at Ferozepore (44th (Ferozepore) Brigade). In October 1918 he became General Officer Commanding (GOC) Bushire Field Force in Persia, for which he was appointed Companion of the Order of the Bath (CB) in January 1920. From January 1919 to April 1921 he commanded the 11th Indian Brigade at Abbottabad. In June 1920 he was promoted major-general and also became GOC Kohat Kurram Force for several months.

== Retirement and family ==
He retired in April 1923. In June 1926 he was appointed colonel of his old regiment, now the 2nd Battalion, 13th Frontier Force Rifles, an honorary position he held until 1939.

Elsmie married Annie Todd; they had four sons (two of whom were killed serving with the Royal Air Force in the Second World War) and three daughters.
