= Ernest Rivett-Carnac =

English cricketer and British Army officer

Brigadier-General Ernest Rivett-Carnac
- Born: Ernest Henry Rivett-Carnac; 30 June 1857; Steyning, Sussex, England
- Died: 4 September 1940 (aged 83); Beaulieu, Hampshire, England
- Cricket career

Cricket information
- Batting: Unknown

Domestic team information
- Years: Team
- 1900: Marylebone Cricket Club

Career statistics
Competition	First-class
Matches	1
Runs scored	10
Batting average	10.00
100s/50s	–/–
Top score	10
Catches/stumpings	–/–
- Source: Cricinfo, 12 September 2021

Ernest Henry Rivett-Carnac (30 June 1857 — 4 September 1940) was an officer in both the British Army and later British Indian Army and an English first-class cricketer.

The son of William John Rivett-Carnac, he was born in June 1857 at Steyning, Sussex. He was educated at Harrow School. From Harrow he joined the 85th Foot as a lieutenant in February 1876, serving in the Second Anglo-Afghan War of 1878 to 1880. He was transferred to the Bengal Staff Corps in July 1880. He served in the Anglo-Egyptian War of 1882, where he was present at the battles of Kassassin Lock and Tell El Kebir. He was decorated for his contributions in the war with the Khedive's Star, and by the Ottoman Empire with the Order of the Medjidie, 5th Class. He was later promoted to captain in February 1887, prior to serving in the Miranzai Expeditions of 1891. He was promoted to major in February 1896.

Rivett-Carnac returned to England in 1900, where he played a single first-class cricket match for the Marylebone Cricket Club (MCC) against London County at Lord's. Batting once in the match, he was dismissed for 10 runs in the MCC first innings by Ernie Robson, with the MCC winning the match by an innings and 175 runs. Returning to British India, he was promoted to the lieutenant colonel in February 1902, with promotion to brevet colonel in the 8th Cavalry following in May 1905. Between 1906 and 1910, Rivett-Carnac commanded the Ambala Cavalry Brigade. In July 1909 he was made a colonel on the staff and was granted the temporary rank of brigadier-general. He retired from active service in February 1914. Rivett-Carnac retired to England, where he died at Beaulieu, Hampshire. His elder brothers, Sir William and Sir Clennell, were the 5th and 6th Baronets respectively of the Rivett-Carnac baronets.
