= 3rd (Ambala) Cavalry Brigade =

Ambala Brigade Ambala Cavalry Brigade 3rd (Ambala) Cavalry Brigade
- Active: July 1904 – March 1918
- Country: British India
- Allegiance: British Crown
- Branch: British Indian Army
- Type: Cavalry
- Size: Brigade
- Part of: 3rd (Lahore) Division; 1st Indian Cavalry Division; 2nd Indian Cavalry Division
- Garrison/HQ: Ambala Cantonment
- Engagements: First World War Western Front Battle of the Somme (1916) Battle of Bazentin Battle of Flers–Courcelette Battle of Cambrai (1917)

Commanders
- Notable commanders: Br.-Gen. R.B. Adams VC

The Ambala Cavalry Brigade was a cavalry brigade of the British Indian Army formed in 1904 as a result of the Kitchener Reforms. It was mobilized as 3rd (Ambala) Cavalry Brigade at the outbreak of the First World War as part of the 1st Indian Cavalry Division and departed for France. It served on the Western Front with the 1st and 2nd Indian Cavalry Divisions until it was broken up in March 1918.

== History ==
The Kitchener Reforms, carried out during Lord Kitchener's tenure as Commander-in-Chief, India (1902–09), completed the unification of the three former Presidency armies, the Punjab Frontier Force, the Hyderabad Contingent and other local forces into one Indian Army. Kitchener identified the Indian Army's main task as the defence of the North-West Frontier against foreign aggression (particularly Russian expansion into Afghanistan) with internal security relegated to a secondary role. The Army was organized into divisions and brigades that would act as field formations but also included internal security troops.

The Ambala Brigade (also referred to as Umballa Brigade) was formed in July 1904 (Note: 18 July 1904 was the appointment date of the brigade's first commanding officer.) as a result of the Kitchener Reforms. The brigade formed part of the 3rd (Lahore) Division. In 1908, it was redesignated as Ambala Cavalry Brigade.

3rd (Ambala) Cavalry Brigade

In August 1914, the brigade was mobilized as the 3rd (Ambala) Cavalry Brigade and assigned to the 1st Indian Cavalry Division. A new Ambala Brigade was formed in November 1914 as part of the 3rd Lahore Divisional Area to take over the original brigade's internal security duties.

With 1st Indian Cavalry Division, it departed Bombay on 16 October and landed at Marseille on 7 November. It concentrated around Orléans on 16 November and was sent up to the Front on 26 November. While in France, the brigade was known by its geographical rather than numerical designation so as to avoid confusion with the British 3rd Cavalry Brigade also serving on the Western Front at the same time. On 15 September 1915, the brigade swapped places with the 5th (Mhow) Cavalry Brigade from 2nd Indian Cavalry Division.

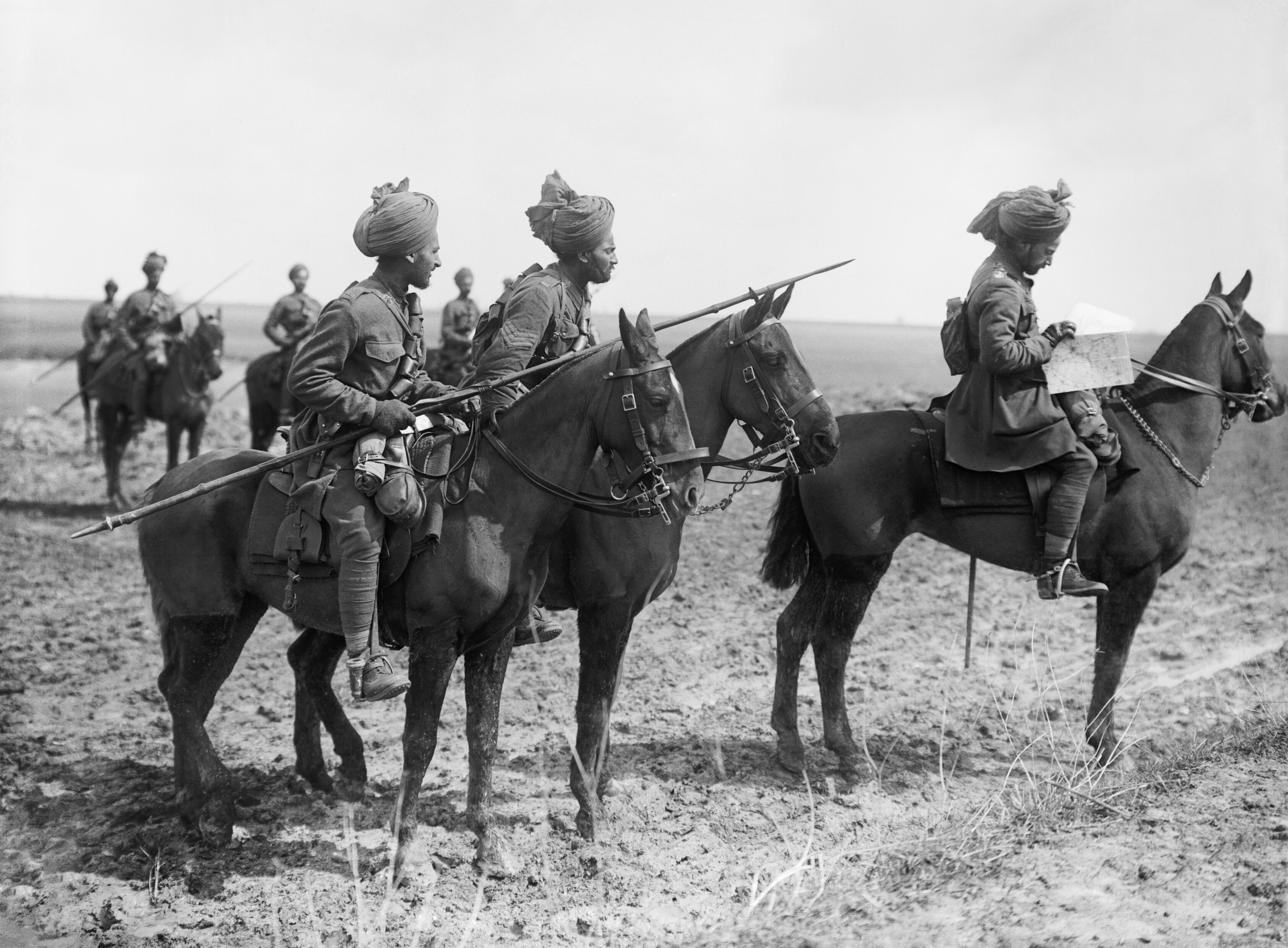
Forward scouts of the 9th Hodson's Horse pause to consult a map, near Vraignes, France in April 1917

In 1916, the brigade took part in the Battle of the Somme, notably the Battle of Bazentin (14 – 17 July) and the Battle of Flers–Courcelette (15 – 22 September). In 1917, the brigade took part in the Battle of Cambrai, notably the Tank Attack (20 – 21 November) and the German Counter-attacks (30 November – 3 December). At other times it was held in reserve in case of a breakthrough, although it did send parties to the trenches on a number of occasions. They would hold the line, or act as Pioneers; such parties were designated as the Ambala Battalion.

Dissolved

In March 1918, the brigade was broken up in France. The British units (8th (King's Royal Irish) Hussars and X Battery, RHA) remained in France and the Indian elements were sent to Egypt. On 24 April 1918, these were merged with the 5th Mounted Brigade and joined the new 2nd Mounted Division. On 22 July 1918 the 5th Mounted Brigade was redesignated as 13th Cavalry Brigade and the division as 5th Cavalry Division.

== Orders of battle ==
In India in August 1914
At the outbreak of the First World War, the brigade had the following composition:
- 8th (King's Royal Irish) Hussars
- 9th Hodson's Horse
- 30th Lancers (Gordon's Horse)
- 7th Hariana Lancers (attached to 7th (Ferozepore) Brigade from August to September 1914; remained at Ferozepore under 3rd Lahore Divisional Area when the brigade departed for France)
- 15th Lancers (Cureton's Multanis) (attached to 8th (Jullundur) Brigade from August to September 1914; went to France as divisional cavalry for the 3rd (Lahore) Division)
- 37th Lancers (Baluch Horse) (in the Multan garrison from August to September 1914; transferred to Jullundur garrison under 3rd Lahore Divisional Area)
- 23rd Cavalry (Frontier Force) (in the Lahore garrison in August 1914; remained there under 3rd Lahore Divisional Area)

Western Front
The brigade's composition on the Western Front included:
- 8th (King's Royal Irish) Hussars
- 9th Hodson's Horse
- 30th Lancers (Gordon's Horse) (transferred in June 1916 to 7th (Meerut) Cavalry Brigade)
- 18th King George's Own Tiwana Lancers (joined in June 1916 from 7th (Meerut) Cavalry Brigade)
- A Battery, Royal Horse Artillery (joined in December 1914; transferred on 15 September 1915 to 5th (Mhow) Cavalry Brigade when the brigades swapped places) (Note: A Battery, Royal Horse Artillery was part of I Indian Brigade, Royal Horse Artillery but was attached to the brigade.)
- X Battery, Royal Horse Artillery (joined on 15 September 1915 from 5th (Mhow) Cavalry Brigade) (Note: X Battery, Royal Horse Artillery was part of II Indian Brigade, Royal Horse Artillery but was attached to the brigade.)
- 14th Machine Gun Squadron (joined on 29 February 1916) (Note: 14th Machine Gun Squadron was formed on 29 February 1916 by combining the machine gun sections of the 8th (King's Royal Irish) Hussars, 9th Hodson's Horse and 18th King George's Own Tiwana Lancers.)

== Commanders ==
The Ambala Brigade / Ambala Cavalry Brigade / 3rd (Ambala) Cavalry Brigade had the following commanders:

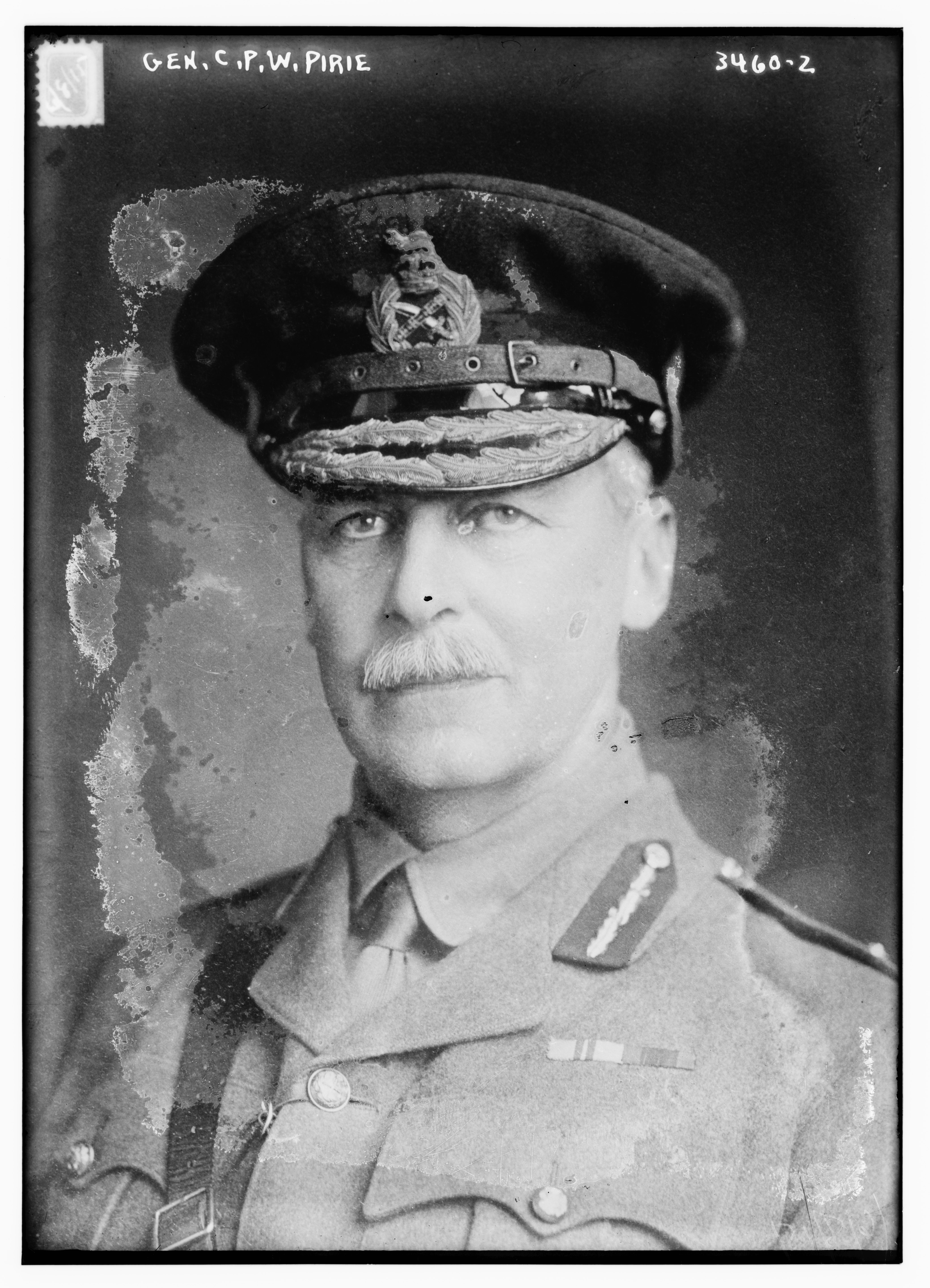
Major-General C.P.W. Pirie

From	Rank	Name	Notes
18 July 1904	Brigadier-General	Robert Bellew Adams VC	
28 April 1906	Brigadier-General	Edward Henry McSwiney	
4 March 1907	Brigadier-General	Francis Sudlow Garratt	
July 1909	Brigadier-General	Ernest Henry Rivett-Carnac	
11 April 1910	Major-General	Charles Patrick William Pirie	
1 May 1916	Brigadier-General	Charles Herbert Rankin	Broken up in March 1918

== See also ==
- Ambala Brigade formed in India to replace the original brigade when it was mobilized
- Indian Cavalry Corps order of battle First World War
- Indian Expeditionary Force A

== Bibliography ==
- Becke, Archibald F. (1936). Order of Battle of Divisions Part 2A. The Territorial Force Mounted Divisions and the 1st-Line Territorial Force Divisions (42–56). London: HMSO. OCLC 4405016.
- Haythornthwaite, Philip J. (1996). The World War One Source Book. London: Arms and Armour Press. ISBN 1-85409-351-7.
- Mackie, Colin (June 2015). "Army Commands 1900-2011" (PDF). www.gulabin.com. Archived from the original (PDF) on 5 July 2015.
- Perry, F.W. (1993). Order of Battle of Divisions Part 5B. Indian Army Divisions. Newport: Ray Westlake Military Books. ISBN 1-871167-23-X.
