= William Cross Barratt =

- Born: 2 June 1862; Calcutta, British India
- Died: 2 April 1940 (aged 77); Guernsey, Channel Islands
- Military career
- Allegiance: United Kingdom
- Branch: British Army
- Service years: 1883 – 1920
- Rank: Major General
- Unit: Royal Berkshire Regiment
- Conflicts: Suakin Expedition; Zhob Valley Expedition; Boxer Rebellion; First World War
- Awards: CB, CSI, DSO

Major General William Cross Barratt CB CSI DSO (2 June 1862 – 2 April 1940) was a senior British Army and British Indian Army officer.

== Biography ==
Born in Calcutta, Barratt was educated at Bedford School. He received his first commission in the Royal Berkshire Regiment in 1883. He served in Sudan during the Suakin Expedition of 1885, and fought at the Battle of Hasheen and at the Battle of Tofrek. In 1890 he took part in the Zhob Valley Expedition in India, and fought in Waziristan between 1894 and 1895. He served in East Africa in 1896, in Zanzibar and Uganda between 1897 and 1898, in China during the Boxer Rebellion between 1900 and 1901, and was present at the Relief of Peking. He subsequently served on the North West Frontier in India. He was appointed as General Officer Commanding the 9th (Secunderabad) Division and as General Officer Commanding the 16th Indian Division.

Major General William Cross Barratt retired from the British Indian Army in 1920. He died on 2 April 1940.
