= 3rd Lahore Divisional Area =

- Active: September 1914 – May 1917
- Country: British India
- Allegiance: British Crown
- Branch: British Indian Army
- Type: Infantry
- Size: Division
- Part of: Northern Army
- Garrison/HQ: Dalhousie Cantonment
- Service: First World War

Commanders
- Notable commanders: Br.-Gen. W.C. Barratt

The 3rd Lahore Divisional Area was an infantry division of the British Indian Army that formed part of the Indian Army during the First World War. It was formed in September 1914 to replace the original 3rd (Lahore) Division that had been mobilized in August 1914 for service on the Western Front. It was abolished in May 1917 when its remaining responsibilities were passed on to the 16th Indian Division.

== History ==
At the outbreak of the First World War, the 3rd (Lahore) Division was mobilized in August 1914 and sailed from Bombay and Karachi between 24 and 29 September for the Western Front. The 3rd Lahore Divisional Area was formed in September 1914 to take over the area responsibilities of the 3rd (Lahore) Division. It took over the units left behind by the original division and started to form brigades to control them: the Ambala Brigade in November and the 44th (Ferozepore) Brigade in December 1914. However, the 45th (Jullundur) Brigade was not reformed until February 1917. The division served under Northern Army.

It was intended to form a reserve division for the North West Frontier, but the urgent need to find troops for Mesopotamia meant that the 16th Indian Division was not formed until December 1916. In February 1917, 44th (Ferozepore) Brigade joined 43rd Indian Brigade in the new division. The Divisional Area and 16th Indian Division existed side by side until May 1917 when the 16th Indian Division took over the last of the area responsibilities and the 3rd Lahore Divisional Area was abolished.

== Order of battle ==
The division commanded the following brigades in the First World War:

- Ambala Brigade (Note: 3rd (Lahore) Division mobilized with 7th (Ferozepore), 8th (Jullundur) and 9th (Sirhind) Brigades. They are not to be confused with the 44th (Ferozepore) and 45th (Jullundur) Brigades reformed in the 3rd Lahore Divisional Area. Sirhind Brigade was not reformed. In addition, the 3rd (Ambala) Cavalry Brigade mobilized for the 1st Indian Cavalry Division and should not be confused with the Ambala Brigade.) – formed in November 1914; to 16th Indian Division in May 1917
- 44th (Ferozepore) Brigade – formed in December 1914; to 16th Indian Division in February 1917
- 45th (Jullundur) Brigade – formed in February 1917; to 16th Indian Division in May 1917

== Commanders ==
The 3rd Lahore Divisional Area had the following commanders:

From	Rank	Name	Notes
12 September 1914	Brigadier-General	W.C. Barratt	
November 1916	Brigadier-General	R.M. Betham	
5 December 1915	Major-General	W.C. Barratt	Abolished in May 1917

== See also ==
- 3rd (Lahore) Division for the original division
- List of Indian divisions in World War I

== Bibliography ==
- Gaylor, John (1996). Sons of John Company: The Indian and Pakistan Armies 1903–1991 (2nd ed.). Tunbridge Wells: Parapress. ISBN 1-898594-41-4.
- Mackie, Colin (June 2015). "Army Commands 1900-2011" (PDF). www.gulabin.com. Archived from the original (PDF) on 5 July 2015.
- Perry, F.W. (1993). Order of Battle of Divisions Part 5B. Indian Army Divisions. Newport: Ray Westlake Military Books. ISBN 1-871167-23-X.
