= Kohat Brigade =

The Kohat Brigade (now 101 Infantry Brigade, Sialkot, Pakistan) was formed after the 1903 reforms of the British Indian Army by Herbert Kitchener when he was Commander-in-Chief, India. The brigade was part of the Northern Army and deployed along the North West Frontier. In 1914 at the start of World War I the brigade formation was:

- Commander Major General A Campbell
  - 31st Duke of Connaught's Own Lancers
  - 53rd Sikhs (Frontier Force)
  - 54th Sikhs (Frontier Force)
  - 56th Punjabi Rifles (Frontier Force)
  - 122nd Rajputana Infantry
  - 31st Mountain Battery
  - Frontier Force Garrison Artillery

== See also ==
- List of Indian Army Brigades in World War II

== Bibliography ==
- Sumner, Ian (2001). The Indian Army 1914-1947. Osprey Publishing. ISBN 1-84176-196-6.
