= 69th Punjabis =

- Active: 1759-1922
- Country: Indian Empire
- Branch: Army
- Type: Infantry
- Part of: Madras Army (to 1895); Madras Command
- Colors: Red; faced gosling-green, 1882 dark green, 1891 emerald green
- Engagements: Carnatic Wars; Second Anglo-Mysore War; Third Anglo-Mysore War; Second Anglo-Burmese War; World War I

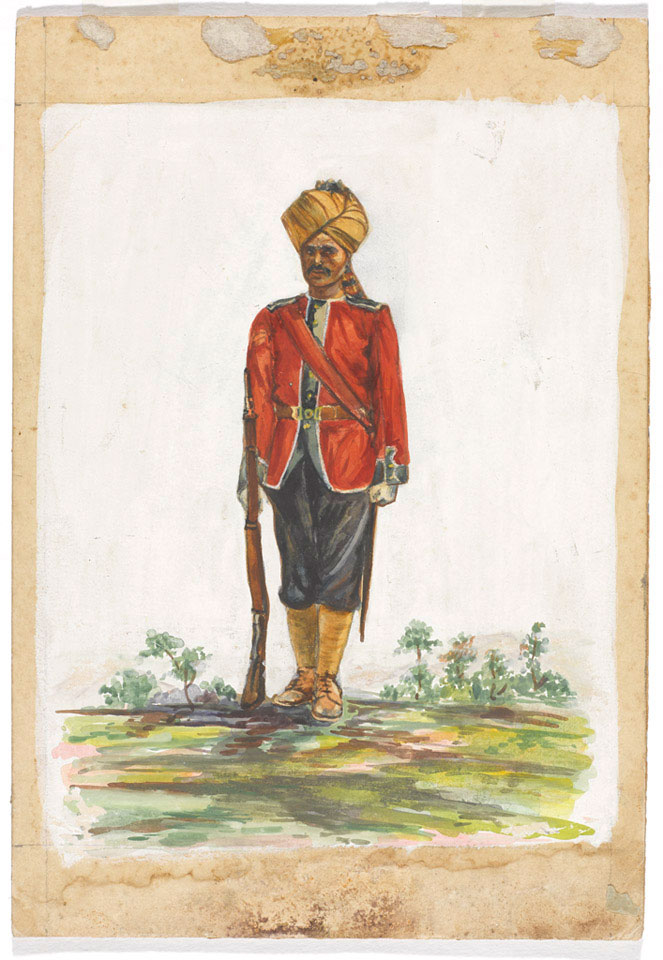
c. 1890 illustration of a 9th Regiment of Madras Infantry havildar

The 69th Punjabis were an infantry regiment of the British Indian Army. They could trace their origins to 1759, when they were raised as the 10th Battalion Coast Sepoys. The regiment's first engagement was during the Carnatic Wars, this was followed by service during the Battle of Sholinghur in the Second Anglo-Mysore War and the Third Anglo-Mysore War. They also took part in the annexation of Pegu during the Second Anglo-Burmese War.

The Battalion was awarded the Galley Badge in 1839 for 'readiness always evinced' for proceeding on foreign service, which was then considered a taboo in India. The Galley is now the crest of the Indian Punjab Regiment. The Battalion was also given the Battle Cry - Khushki Wuh Tarri which is Persian for 'By Land and Sea'. The Indianised version of this motto 'Sthal Wuh Jal' is now the Battle Cry of the Indian Punjab Regiment. In early 1900 the regiment was stationed at Colombo. During World War I they served in the Middle East on the Suez Canal and in the Gallipoli Campaign after which they were sent to the Western Front in 1915.

After World War I the Indian government reformed the army moving from single battalion regiments to multi battalion regiments. In 1922, the 69th Punjabis became the 2nd Battalion, 2nd Punjab Regiment. After independence they were one of the regiments allocated to the Indian Army. Gen KM Cariappa, OBE, the first Indian Commander in Chief, decided that the four senior most Infantry Battalions of the Army should form the Brigade of the Guards, and thus 2/2 Punjab was converted to the First Battalion Brigade of the Guards (2 PUNJAB) in 1951. The Battalion has the distinction of being the most senior Infantry Battalion of the Indian Army.

== Predecessor names ==
- 10th Battalion of Coast Sepoys - 1759
- 10th Carnatic Battalion - 1769
- 9th Carnatic Battalion - 1770
- 9th Madras Battalion - 1784
- 1st Battalion, 9th Regiment of Madras Native Infantry - 1796
- 9th Regiment of Madras Native Infantry - 1824
- 9th Regiment of Madras Infantry - 1885
- 69th Punjabis - 1903

== Sources ==
- Barthorp, Michael; Burn, Jeffrey (1979). Indian infantry regiments 1860-1914. Osprey Publishing. ISBN 0-85045-307-0.
- Rinaldi, Richard A (2008). Order of Battle British Army 1914. Ravi Rikhye. ISBN 978-0-9776072-8-0.
- Sharma, Gautam (1990). Valour and sacrifice: famous regiments of the Indian Army. Allied Publishers. ISBN 81-7023-140-X.
- Sumner, Ian (2001). The Indian Army 1914-1947. Osprey Publishing. ISBN 1-84176-196-6.
- Moberly, Frederick James (1927) [1923]. The Campaign in Mesopotamia 1914–1918. History of the Great War Based on Official Documents. Vol. I. London: HMSO. OCLC 772784341.
