= 16th Indian Division =

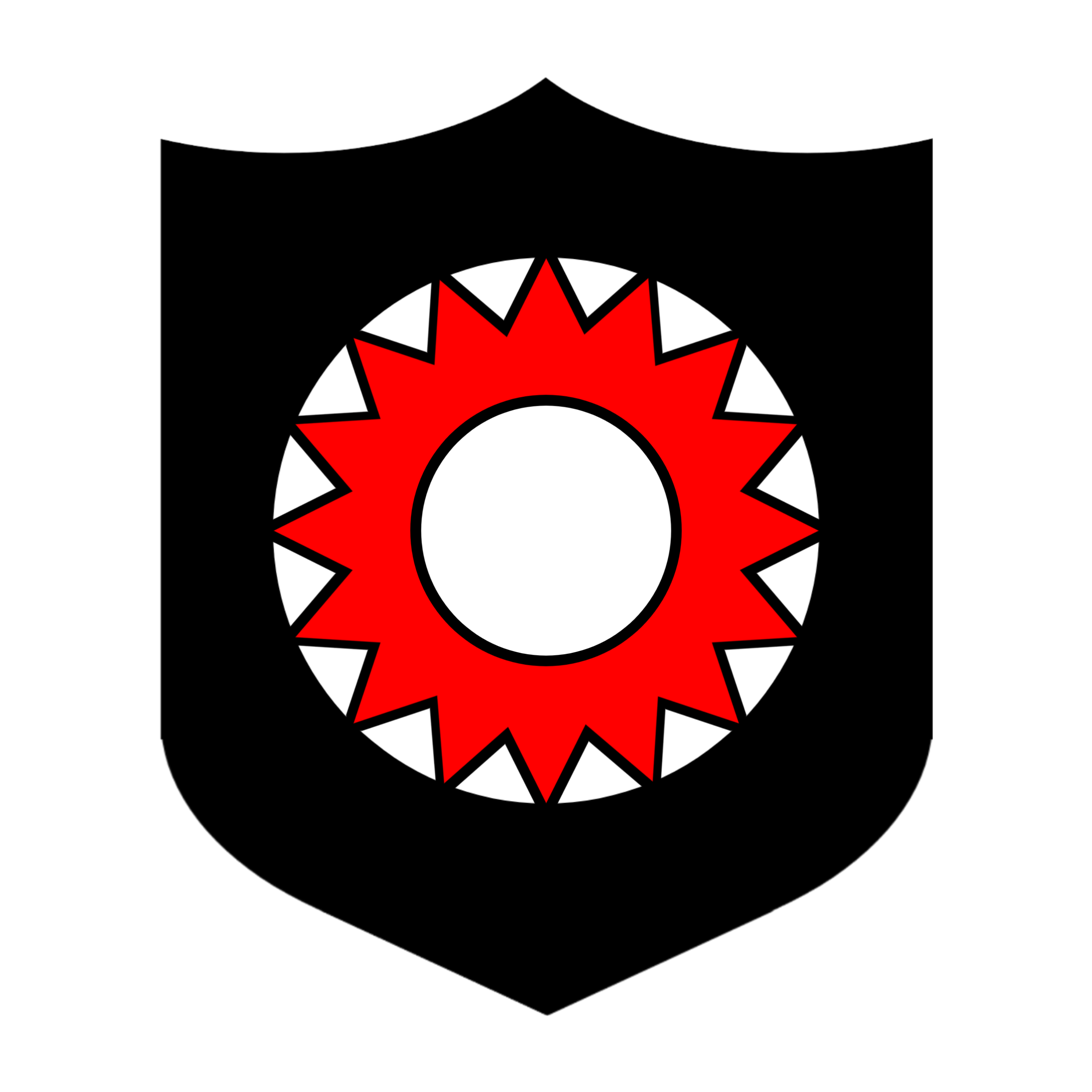
- Insignia of the 16th Infantry Division
- Active: 1916–1922
- Country: British India
- Allegiance: British Crown
- Branch: British Indian Army
- Type: Infantry
- Size: Division
- Part of: Northern Army
- Engagements: First World War; Third Afghan War

The 16th Indian Division was an infantry division of the Indian Army during the First World War. It was formed in December 1916, during the First World War. It was the only war formed division of the British Indian Army that was not sent overseas, (Note: The 3rd Lahore, 6th Poona, and 7th Meerut Divisional Areas also remained in India throughout the war.) instead it was sent to guard the North West Frontier. The division took over the responsibilities of the 3rd Lahore Divisional Area when it was disbanded in May 1917.

The 16th Division was called into action for the Waziristan Campaign in 1917, the 45th (Jullundur) Brigade under command of Brigadier Reginald Dyer were responsible for the Jallianwala Bagh massacre. In 1919, they were sent into Afghanistan during the Third Afghan War.

The division was not reformed for the Second World War.

== Order of Battle ==
The division was composed as follows:

=== 43rd Indian Brigade ===
- 2/6th Battalion Royal Sussex Regiment
- 2nd Battalion 12th Pioneers
- 1st Battalion 124th Duchess of Connaught's Own Baluchistan
- 1st Battalion 4th Gurkha Rifles

=== 44th (Ferozepore) Brigade ===
Joined the division in February 1917:

- 1/9th Battalion Hampshire Regiment
- 2nd Battalion 17th Infantry
- 2nd Battalion 30th Punjabis (Replaced by the 3rd battalion August 1918)

=== 45th (Jullundur) Brigade ===
Joined the division in May 1917:

- 1/25th Battalion London Regiment
- 3rd Battalion 23rd Sikh Pioneers
- 55th Coke's Rifles (Frontier Force)
- 1st Battalion 151st Sikh Infantry

In the Third Afghan War the formation was:

- 1 Squadron 37th Lancers (Baluch Horse)
- 1/25th Battalion London Regiment
- 2nd Battalion 41st Dogras
- 2nd Battalion 69th Punjabis
- 2nd Battalion 150th Infantry
- 57th Wilde's Rifles (Frontier Force)
- 1 Company 2/4th Battalion Border Regiment
- 23rd (Peshawar) Mountain Battery (Frontier Force)

=== Ambala Brigade ===
Joined the division in May 1917:

- 1/9th Battalion Middlesex Regiment
- 4th Battalion 30th Punjabis

=== Divisional troops ===
- 23rd Battalion Rifle Brigade
- 2nd Battalion 10th Jats

=== Divisional Artillery ===
- VI Brigade, Royal Field Artillery (RFA)
- CCXVII Brigade, RFA
- CCXVIII Brigade, RFA
- CCXXI Brigade, RFA

== See also ==
- List of Indian divisions in World War I

== Bibliography ==
- Collett, Nigel (2007). The Butcher of Amritsar: General Reginald Dyer. Continuum International Publishing Group. ISBN 1-85285-575-4.
- Kempton, Chris (2003a). 'Loyalty & Honour', The Indian Army September 1939 – August 1947. Vol. Part I Divisions. Milton Keynes: The Military Press. ISBN 0-85420-228-5.
- Perry, F.W. (1993). Order of Battle of Divisions Part 5B. Indian Army Divisions. Newport: Ray Westlake Military Books. ISBN 1-871167-23-X.
