= 1st (Peshawar) Division =

- Active: 1903
- Country: British India
- Allegiance: British Crown
- Branch: British Indian Army
- Type: Infantry
- Size: Division
- Engagements: Third Afghan War

Commanders
- Notable commanders: Major-Gen. Charles James Blomfield (from October 1912 to June 1915); Major-Gen. Sir Frederick Campbell (from June 1915 to April 1919. Became Lieut-Gen. Sir from 1 July 1917)

The 1st (Peshawar) Division was a Regular Division of the British Indian Army formed as a result of the Kitchener reforms of the Indian Army in 1903. During World War I, the Division remained in India for local defense, but was mobilized for action on the North West Frontier on several occasions.

The Division was a part of the Northern Army, later called the Northern Command. In 1919, the Division was mobilized for operations in Afghanistan during the Third Afghan War. Typical of most Indian Army formations, it contained a mixture of British and Indian units; but, unlike British Divisions, it contained a mixture of cavalry and infantry components.

== Formation in 1914 ==
=== 1st (Risalpur) Cavalry Brigade ===
13th Duke of Connaught's Lancers
14th Murray's Jat Lancers
1st Duke of York's Own Skinner's Horse
Queen Victoria's Own Corps of Guides (Frontier Force) Lumsden's) Cavalry
21st Lancers
M Battery, Royal Horse Artillery
1st Guides Infantry.

=== 1st (Peshawar) Infantry Brigade ===
2nd Bn, King's (Liverpool Regiment)
1st Bn, Royal Sussex Regiment
14th Sikhs
21st Punjabis
72nd Punjabis.

=== 2nd (Nowshera) Infantry Brigade ===
1st Bn, Durham Light Infantry
24th Punjabis
46th Punjabis
82nd Punjabis
112th Infantry

=== Peshawar Brigade ===
Formed July 1918

1st Bn, Yorkshire Regiment
30th Lancers.

=== Divisional Troops ===
2/1st Guides Rifles
38th Dogras
51st Sikhs.

== See also ==
- List of Indian divisions in World War I

== Bibliography ==
- Haythornthwaite, Philip J. (1996). The World War One Source Book. London: Arms and Armour Press. ISBN 1-85409-351-7.
- Moberly, F.J. (1997) [1st Pub. 1923]. Official History of the War: Mesopotamia Campaign. London: Imperial War Museum. ISBN 1-870423-30-5.
- Perry, F.W. (1993). Order of Battle of Divisions Part 5B. Indian Army Divisions. Newport: Ray Westlake Military Books. ISBN 1-871167-23-X.
