= 4th (Quetta) Division =

- Country: British India
- Branch: British Indian Army
- Type: Infantry
- Size: Division
- Garrison/HQ: Quetta

The 4th (Quetta) Division was an infantry division of the British Indian Army. It was formed by General Kitchener while he was Commander-in-chief of India. During World War I the division remained in India. Its composition was:

== Formation 1914 ==
- Commanding officer Lt General Malcolm Henry Grover
- 1st Quetta Infantry Brigade Brigadier General Sitwell
  - 2nd Battalion Somerset Light Infantry
  - 12th Pioneers
  - 19th Punjabis
  - 58th Vaughn's Rifles
  - 1/7th Gurkha Rifles
  - 2/7th Gurkha
  - XXI Brigade Royal Field Artillery (RFA)
- 2nd Quetta Infantry Brigade Major General Mellis VC
  - 2nd Battalion Royal Irish Fusiliers
  - 40th Pathans
  - 67th Punjabis
  - 106th Hazara Pioneers
  - 114th Mahrattas
  - IV Mountain Brigade Royal Garrison Artillery (RGA)
- Karachi Brigade Brigadier General Shaw
  - 1st Battalion Lancashire Fusiliers
  - 127th Baluch Light Infantry
  - 69 Company RGA
- Divisional troops
  - 10th Duke of Cambridge's Own Lancers (Hodson's Horse)
  - 22nd Cavalry (Frontier Force)
  - 28th Light Cavalry
  - 15th Sikhs
  - 29th Punjabis
  - 31st Punjabis
  - 60 Company RGA

== See also ==
- List of Indian divisions in World War I

== Bibliography ==
- Perry, F.W. (1993). Order of Battle of Divisions Part 5B. Indian Army Divisions. Newport: Ray Westlake Military Books. ISBN 1-871167-23-X.
