= 12th Pioneers =

12th Pioneers (Kelat-i-Ghilzie Regiment)
- Active: 1838–1923
- Country: British Raj
- Branch: Army
- Type: Infantry
- Uniform: Red, faced white

The 12th Pioneers (The Kelat-i-Ghilzie Regiment) were an infantry regiment of the British Indian Army. They could trace their origins to 1838, when they were raised as the 3rd Battalion, Shah Shuja's Force. In 1842 the battalion distinguished itself at the battle of fort Kelat-i-Ghilzie for which it was allowed to retain the name as an honour title. Designated the 12th Pioneers in 1903, it was merged with the 2nd Bombay Pioneers in 1922, finally being disbanded in 1929.

== Sources ==
- Tugwell, Lt Col W.B.P.(1938). The History of the Bombay Pioneers. The Sidney Press Ltd, London.
