= 2nd (Rawalpindi) Division =

- Active: 1903–?
- Country: British India
- Allegiance: British Crown
- Branch: British Indian Army
- Type: Infantry
- Size: Division
- Engagements: Third Anglo-Afghan War

Commanders
- Notable commanders: Major-Gen. Gerald Kitson (1912 to 1916); Major-Gen. W. Bunbury (May 1916 to August 1917); Major-Gen. Sir C. Dobell (August 1917 onwards)

The 2nd (Rawalpindi) Division was a regular army division of the British Indian Army. It was formed in 1903 after the Kitchener reforms of the Indian Army. During World War I it remained in India for local defence but it was mobilised for action on the North West Frontier on several occasions during the period. The Division was mobilised in 1919 for service during the Third Afghan War.

== Formation in August 1914 ==
=== Sialkot (2nd) Cavalry Brigade ===
17th Lancers
6th King Edward's Own Cavalry
19th Lancers

=== Abbottabad (3rd) Brigade ===
1st Battalion, 5th Gurkha Rifles
2nd Battalion, 5th Gurkha Rifles
1st Battalion, 6th Gurkha Rifles
2nd Battalion, 6th Gurkha Rifles
68th, 94th and 104th Companies, Royal Garrison Artillery
VII Brigade, Royal Field Artillery

4th, 38th and 78th Batteries, RFA

=== Rawalpindi (4th) Brigade ===
21st Lancers
5th Cavalry
35th Sikhs
84th Punjabis
9 Mountain Battery, RGA
W Battery, Royal Horse Artillery
II Mountain Brigade, RGA

1st and 6th Mountain Batteries, RGA

=== Jhelum (5th) Brigade ===
21st Cavalry
37th Dogras
69th Punjabis
76th Punjabis
87th Punjabis

=== Unbrigaded ===
32nd Pioneers (at Sialkot)
1st Battalion, Green Howards
4th Battalion, King's Royal Rifle Corps
2nd Battalion, Rifle Brigade
2nd Battalion, North Staffordshire Regiment (at Murree)
I Mountain Brigade, Indian Mountain Artillery (at Abbottabad)

27th and 30th Mountain Batteries, IMA

V Mountain Brigade, IMA

23rd, 28th and 29th Mountain Batteries, IMA

== See also ==
- World War I order of battle: Indian Army

== Bibliography ==
- Haythornthwaite, Philip J. (1996). The World War One Source Book. London: Arms and Armour Press. ISBN 1-85409-351-7.
- Moberly, F. J. (1 September 1997) [1923]. Official History of the War: Mesopotamia Campaign. London: Imperial War Museum. ISBN 1-870423-30-5.
- Perry, F. W. (1993). Order of Battle of Divisions Part 5B. Indian Army Divisions. Newport: Ray Westlake Military Books. ISBN 1-871167-23-X.
