= 25th (County of London) Cyclist Battalion =

26th (Cyclist) Volunteer Corps 25th (County of London) (Cyclists) Battalion, London Regiment
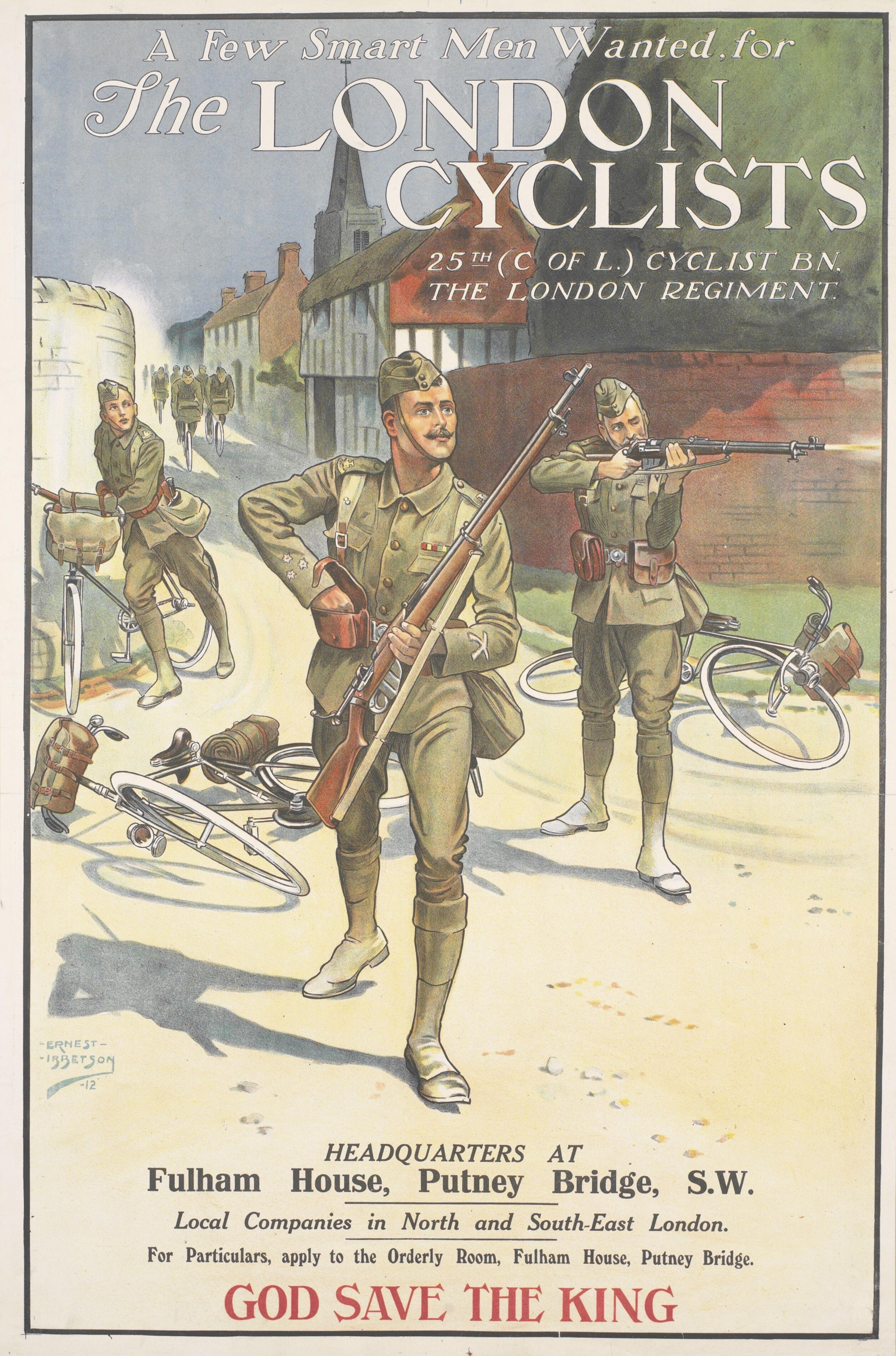
- Recruiting Poster for the 25th County of London) Cyclists, c1912 (Imperial War Museum)
- Active: 1888–1922
- Country: United Kingdom
- Branch: Territorial Army
- Type: Cyclist Battalion; Infantry Battalion
- Garrison/HQ: 2 Queen's Road West, Chelsea (1890); 68 Lillie Road, West Brompton (1899); Fulham House, London (1908)
- Engagements: Third Anglo-Afghan War; Waziristan campaign (1919–20)

25th (County of London) Cyclist Battalion was a bicycle battalion of the London Regiment of the British Army. The battalion was converted to a unit of the Royal Corps of Signals in 1922.

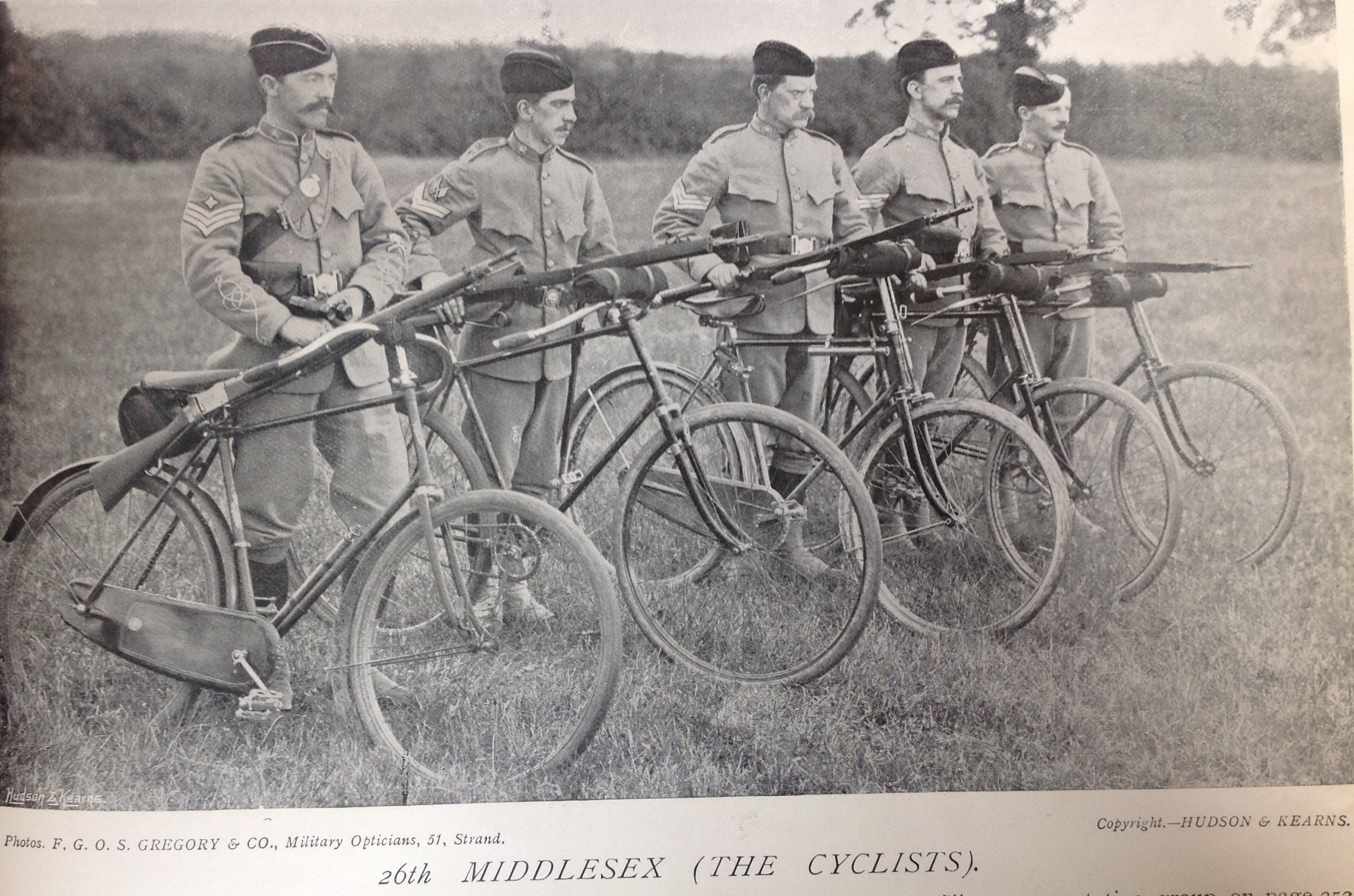
26th Middlesex (Cyclists) Volunteer Corps, 1896

The unit was originally formed on 26 February 1888 as the 26th Middlesex (Cyclist) Volunteer Corps, as part of a growing interest in the use of bicycles for military uses. It originally comprised three troops lettered 'A' to 'C' and was originally linked to the King's Royal Rifle Corps. It was attached to the Inns of Court Regiment and was affiliated with the Rifle Brigade (The Prince Consort's Own).

In 1908 on the formation of the Territorial Force as part of the Haldane Reforms the unit became part of the newly created London Regiment.

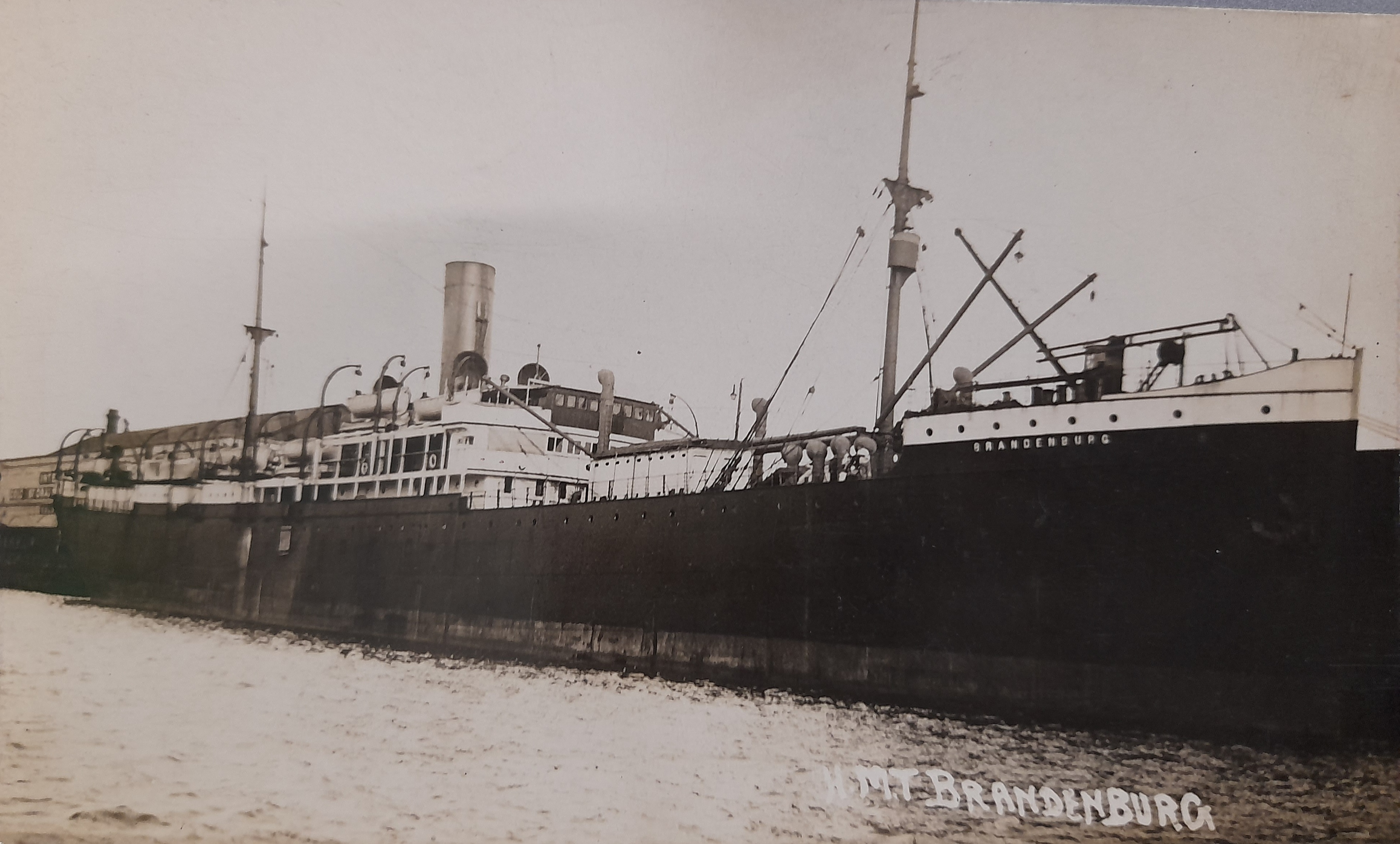
H.M.T. Brandenburg

Men from the unit took part in the early stages of the Waziristan campaign (1919), and in the Third Anglo-Afghan War and some were present at the Amritsar Massacre in April 1919.

The battalion was transported back from India on H.M. Troopship Brandenburg in October 1919.

== Memorials ==
Its First World War memorial is located in All Saints Church, Fulham.

== Bibliography ==
- Maj R. Money Barnes, The Soldiers of London, London: Seeley, Service, 1963.
- Ian F. W. Beckett, Riflemen Form: A study of the Rifle Volunteer Movement 1859–1908, Aldershot: Ogilby Trusts, 1982, ISBN 0-85936-271-X.
- Osborne, Mike, 2006. Always Ready: The Drill Halls of Britain's Volunteer Forces, Partizan Press, Essex. ISBN 1-85818-509-2
- Ray Westlake, Tracing the Rifle Volunteers, Barnsley: Pen and Sword, 2010, ISBN 978-1-84884-211-3.
