= 106th Hazara Pioneers =

106th Hazara Pioneers هزاره پائیز
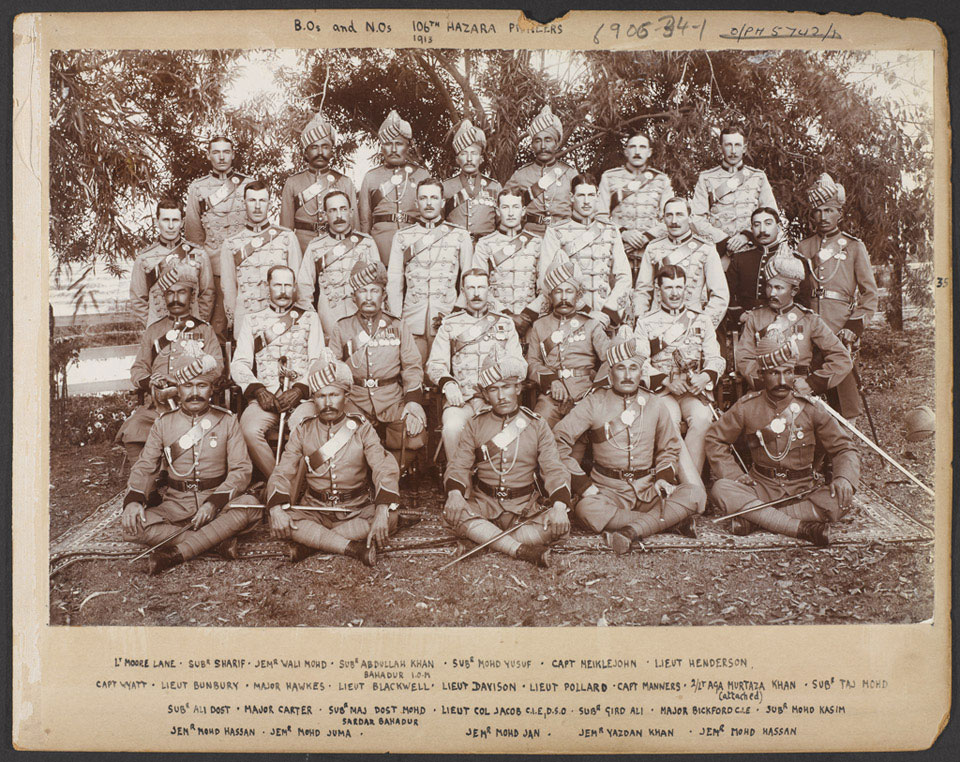
- British and Native officers of the 106th Hazara Pioneers, 1913 Photograph, India, Baluchistan,
- Active: 1904–1933
- Country: British India
- Branch: Army
- Type: Indian Infantry

Insignia
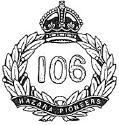
- Infantry Insignia: 106th Hazara Pioneers A crown sitting on the top a King Crown, which is resting upon a wreath with the Regimental name written upon a garter belt

The 106th Hazara Pioneers was a pioneer infantry regiment of the British Indian Army. They were formed in 1904 at Quetta from Hazara people. They were disbanded in 1933.

== Establishment ==
The first contact between the British and the Hazaras was just before the First Afghan War, when some Hazaras served in "Broadfoot's Sappers" (British Scouts) from 1839–1840. A considerable number of Hazaras had come to India to work as labourers prior, particularly in heavy work such as quarrying. In 1903–1904, however, due to high levels of persecution by the Afghans, large numbers of Hazaras refugees poured over the frontier. In 1904, Lord Kitchener, who at that time was Commander-in-Chief in India, directed Major C. W. Jacob to raise a battalion of Hazara Pioneers. Prior to this, the only Hazaras in the Indian Army were those enlisted in the 124th and 126th Baluchistan Infantry, as well as a troop in the Guides Cavalry. The 106th Hazara Pioneers were raised at Quetta in 1904 by Major C. W. Jacob; a nucleus was formed by drafts from the 124th Duchess of Connaught's Own Baluchistan Infantry and the 126th Baluchistan Infantry. The Battalion was composed of eight companies of Hazaras, and their permanent peace station was at Quetta. Their full dress uniform was drab with red facings.

== History ==
In 1918 the Hazaras of the 124th Duchess of Connaught's Own Baluchistan and the 126th Baluchistan Infantry were transferred to the 106th Hazara Pioneers, then assigned to active service in the Mesopotamian campaign. The 106th Hazara Pioneers were now the only unit in the Indian Army enlisting Hazaras nationals.

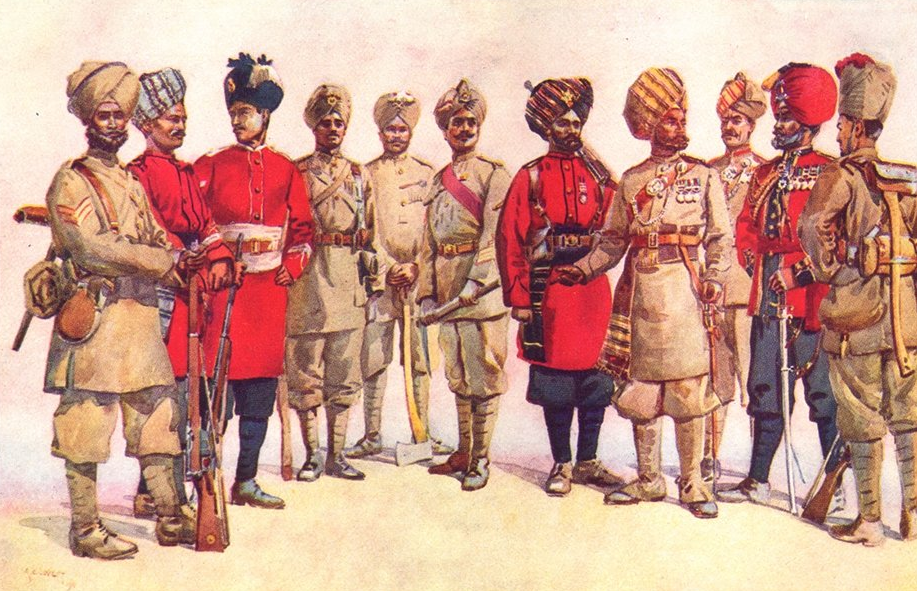
A member of the regiment (third from right) depicted with other British Indian Army pioneers in 1911

There were two changes in the title of the regiment after the 1914–1918 war. The 106th Hazara Pioneers became 1st Battalion 4th Pioneers in 1922 and "The Hazara Pioneers" in 1929. As a result of the financial crisis in 1933, all Pioneer Regiments in the Indian Army, including the Hazara Pioneers, were disbanded.

Following the 1914–1918 war, it became increasingly difficult to recruit Hazaras from the Hazarajat; more recruits had to be taken from the Hazaras colonies settled in the Mashhad area. These men, however, lacked many of the best qualities of the Hazaras enlisted directly from the Afghan highlands. The difficulty in obtaining more of the latter was due chiefly to the change in the attitude of the Afghans towards the Hazaras, who were no longer poorly treated and were now being freely enlisted in the Afghan Army. In addition, the Afghan government had requested the government of India to stop enlisting their subjects (the Hazaras) in the Indian Army.

Field Marshal Sir Claud Jacob was colonel of the regiment from 1916 until its disbandment in 1933.

In 1915, one company served with distinction in France with the 107th Pioneers. The whole regiment was employed during 1915–1916 with the Kalat Column, and at Khwash in Sistan under General Dyer. In 1917 they served on the Mohmand Blockade Line, and sent one company to join the 128th Pioneers in Mesopotamia.

In 1918, the whole regiment proceeded to Mesopotamia where, after serving for some months with the 18th Indian Division on the Tigris above Baghdad, they joined the 2nd Corps and were employed in helping the drive the railway through the Jabal Hamrin from Table Mountain on the Dajla (Tigris River).

During 1919, they worked strenuously on the Shergat-Mosul line of communications. In the autumn of that year they took part in the Kurdistan campaign. In 1920, they were again employed on the Shergat-Mosul lines of communications, completing their labors in 1921 by constructing a new road down the bank of the Tigris from Shergat to Baji. They returned to Quetta in August 1921.

During the above operations, several Indian Orders of Merit, as well as a number of Indian Distinguished Service Medals and Indian Meritorious Service Medals, were awarded to Hazaras for gallantry.

During the Waziristan campaign (1919–1920) of 1923–1924, the Hazara Pioneers took part in the road making through the Baravi Tangi and the Shahur Tangi. Afterward, they helped with the construction of the railway and frontier roads in Zhob.

In 1917, due to the difficulty of enlisting a sufficient number of Hazaras from Afghanistan, the experiment was made of recruiting Baltis as a temporary measure. A recruiting party from the 106th Hazara Pioneers visited Baltistan in the late autumn of 1917. About 100 recruits were enlisted during 1917–1918 and even brought to Quetta for training, but the war ended before any of them were able to join the regiment overseas. After the armistice, nearly all these Baltis were demobilized and returned to their homes.

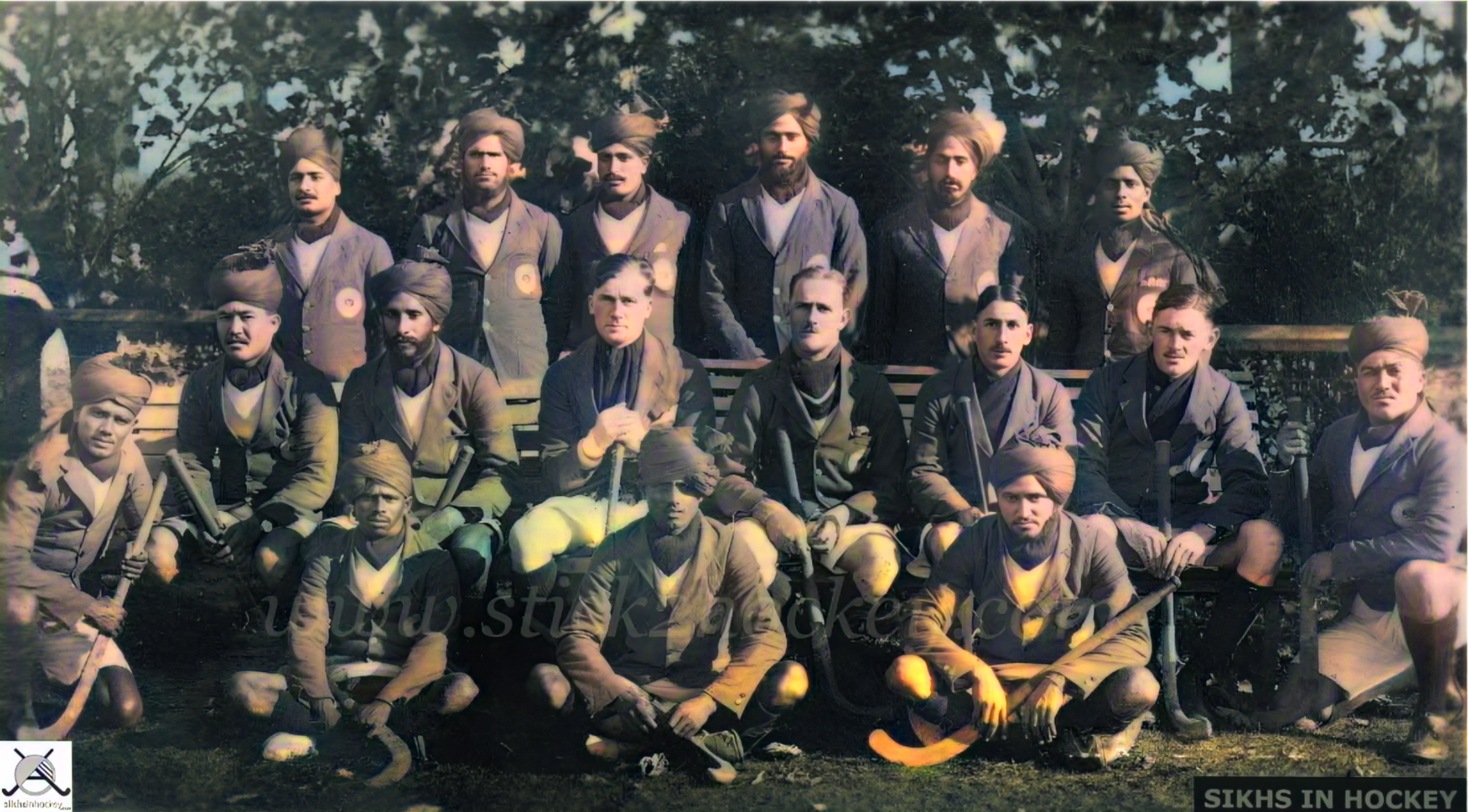
Naik Ghulan Ali middle row (Far–right) & Naik Lal Shah middle row (Far left) (1st Battalion, 4th Hazara Pioneers) in hockey tour of New Zealand 1926

In 1922, the 106th Hazara Pioneers became the 1st Battalion 4th Hazara Pioneers under the new numbering system employed in the British Indian Army, where multi-battalion regiments replaced single-battalion regiments. The 4th Hazara Pioneers were one of four Pioneer units in the 1922 reorganisation, including the 1st Madras Pioneers, 2nd Bombay Pioneers, and 3rd Sikh Pioneers.

== Sarhad Operations 1915–1917 ==
Before the First World War the British Indian Army commenced operations to create a neutral buffer state between Persia (modern-day Iran) and British India to protect the western borders. In 1907, Britain invaded Persia after a convention was agreed with Imperial Russia. Indian troops were stationed in Persia around Mashhad at posts along the telegraph lines. Britain was interested in the north-western region of Persia due to the arms trade between the Arabs and the Ottomans. By mid-1915, the 106th Hazara Pioneers were involved in the operation. After the operation three men with German names were taken prisoner along with a few Baluchi rebels.

== See also ==
- Hazara people
