= 32nd Sikh Pioneers =

- Active: 1857-1922
- Country: British India
- Branch: Army
- Type: Assault pioneer
- Role: Bayonet charge Bomb disposal Close combat Construction; Demolition; Desert warfare Engineer reconnaissance Force protection Jungle warfare Military engineering Military logistics Raiding; Trench warfare
- Size: Three battalions
- Part of: Bengal Army (to 1895); 2nd (Sialkot) Cavalry Brigade
- Nickname(s): Mazhbi Pioneers
- Uniform: Red; faced dark blue
- Engagements: Delhi; Lucknow; 1878 - 80 Afghanistan; 1888 Sikkim Expedition; 1897 Chitral

The 32nd Sikh Pioneers was an assault pioneers regiment of the British Indian Army during British rule. The regiment was founded in 1857 as the Punjab Sappers (Pioneers). After a series of names changes, it became the 32nd Punjab Pioneers in 1901 and the 32nd Sikh Pioneers in 1903. To honour the visit of the Prince and Princess of Wales to Indian they took part in the Rawalpindi Parade 1905. In 1922, it united with 23rd Sikh Pioneers and 34th Sikh Pioneers, to form 2nd Bn, 3rd Sikh Pioneers. Their most celebrated feat of arms was the relief in 1895 of the besieged British garrison of Chitral, by a gruelling crossing of the snow-covered Shandur Pass.

The regiment recruited the Mazhabi Sikhs of Punjab province. Despite being Pioneers by name, the regiment was specially trained as assault pioneers.

It was one of the first native mounted infantry to be posted for active service outside India.
