= Pioneer (military) =

Soldier tasked with engineering and construction

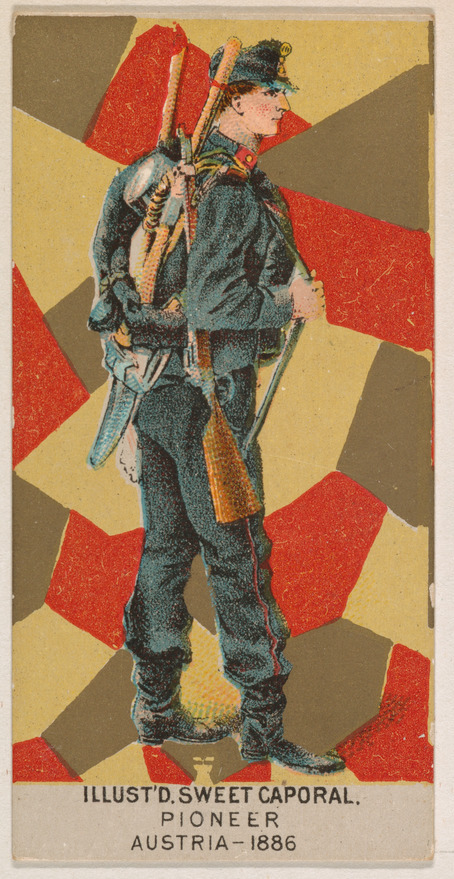
1886 cigarette card depicting a pioneer of the Austro-Hungarian Army

A pioneer (/ˌpaɪ.əˈnɪər/) is a soldier employed to perform engineering and construction tasks. The term is in principle similar to sapper or combat engineer. Pioneers were originally part of the artillery branch of European armies. Subsequently, they formed part of the engineering branch, the logistic branch, part of the infantry, or even comprised a branch in their own right.

Historically, the primary role of pioneer units was to assist other arms in tasks such as the construction of field fortifications, military camps, bridges and roads. Prior to and during the First World War, pioneers were often engaged in the construction and repair of military railways. During World War II, pioneer units were used extensively by all major forces, both on the front line and in supporting roles.

During the 20th century, British Commonwealth military forces came to distinguish between small units of "assault pioneers" belonging to infantry regiments and separate pioneer units (as in the former Royal Pioneer Corps). The United States Marine Corps has sometimes organized its sappers into "Pioneer Battalions". The arrival of the military engineering vehicle and the deployment of weapons of mass destruction vastly expanded capabilities and complicated mission-profiles of modern pioneer units.

== Etymology ==
The word pioneer is originally from France. The word (French: pionnier) was borrowed into English, from Old French pionnier, which meant a "foot soldier", from the root 'peon' recorded in 1523. It was used in a military sense as early as 1626–1627. In the late 18th century, Captain George Smith defined the term as:

PIONEERS, in war-time, are such as are commanded in from the country, to march with an army, for mending the ways, for working on entrenchments, fortifications, and for making mines and approaches: the soldiers are likewise employed in all these things. Most of the foreign regiments of artillery have half a company of pioneers, well instructed in that important branch of duty. Our regiments of infantry and cavalry have 3 or 4 pioneers each, provided with aprons, hatchets, saws, spades, and pick-axes.

== Pioneer regiments in the Indian Army ==
The British Indian Army made extensive use of Pioneers to meet the demands of campaigning in difficult terrain with little or no infrastructure. In 1780, two companies of pioneers were raised in Madras, increasing to 16 in 1803 divided into two battalions. Bombay and Bengal pioneers were formed during the same period. In the late nineteenth century, a number of existing Indian infantry regiments took the title and the construction role of pioneers. The twelve Indian Pioneer regiments in existence in 1914 were trained and equipped for road, rail and engineering work, as well as for conventional infantry service. While this dual function did not qualify them to be regarded as elite units, the frequency with which they saw active service made postings to pioneer regiments popular with British officers.

Prior to World War I, each sepoy in a Pioneer regiment carried a pickaxe or a light spade in special leather equipment as well as a rifle and bayonet. NCOs and buglers carried axes, saws and billhooks. Mules carried heavier equipment, such as explosives. The unit was therefore well equipped for simple field engineering tasks, as well as being able to defend itself in hostile territory. During the War, the increased specialisation required of Pioneers made them too valuable to use as regular assault infantry. Accordingly, in 1929, the Pioneer regiments were taken out of the line infantry and grouped into the Corps of Madras Pioneers (four battalions), the Corps of Bombay Pioneers (four battalions), the Corps of Sikhs Pioneers (four battalions), and the Corps of Hazara Pioneers (one battalion).

All four Pioneer Corps were disbanded in 1933 and their personnel mostly transferred into the Corps of Sappers and Miners, whose role they had come to parallel. It was concluded that the Pioneer battalions had become less technically effective than the Sappers and Miners, but too well trained in specialist functions to warrant being used as ordinary infantry. In addition, their major role of frontier road building had now been allocated to civilian workers. An Indian Pioneer Corps was re-established in 1943.

== Pioneers in the British Army ==
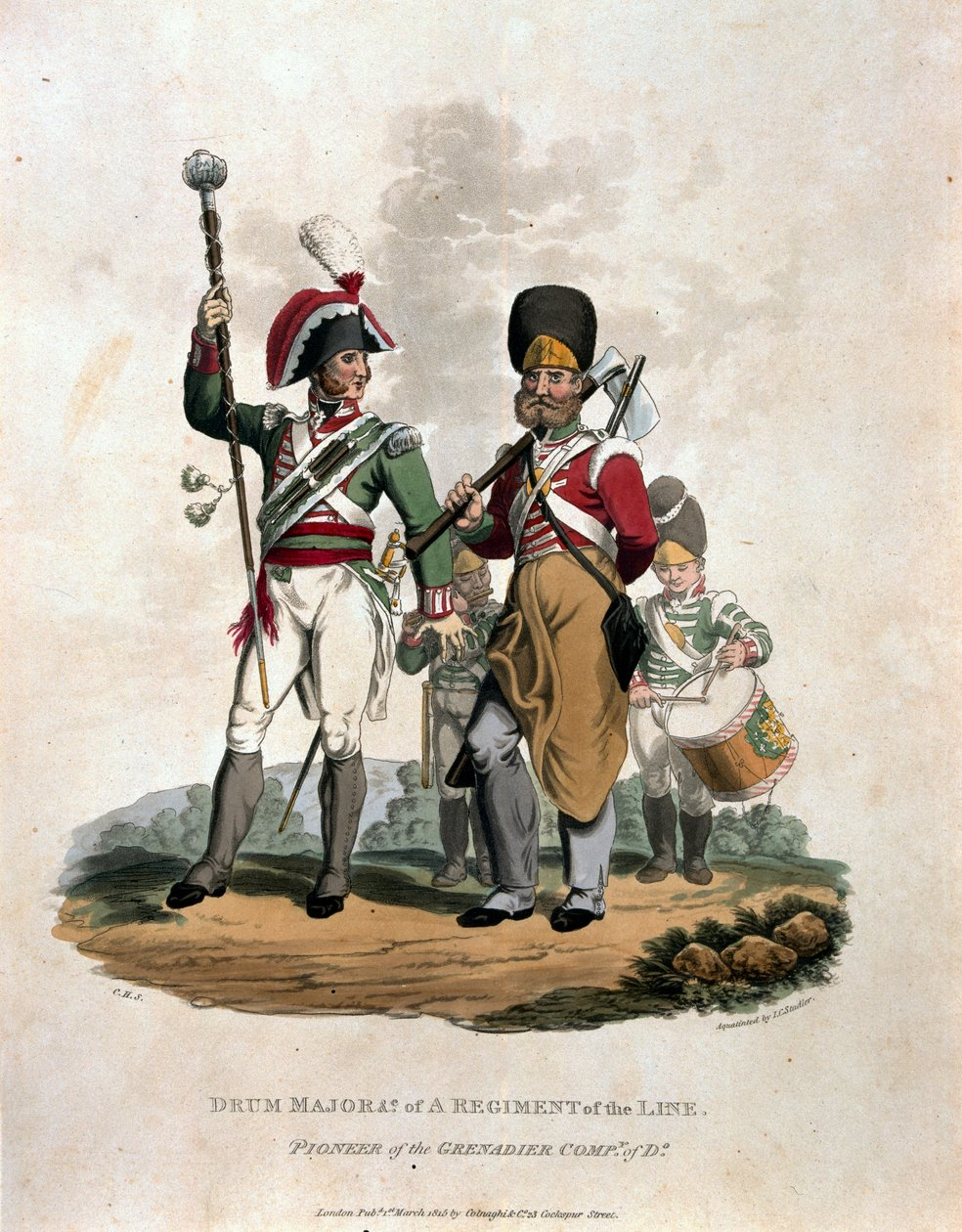
1815 engraving of a British Army pioneer (right)

Historically, British infantry regiments maintained small units of pioneers for heavy work and engineering, especially for clearing paths through forests and for leading assaults on fortifications. These units evolved into assault pioneers. They also inspired the creation of the Royal Pioneer Corps.

During World War I, on paper at least, each division was allocated a pioneer infantry battalion, who in addition to being trained infantry were able to conduct pioneer duties. These pioneer battalions were raised and numbered within the existing infantry regiments; where possible recruits were men who possessed transferable skills from civilian life.

The Royal Pioneer Corps was a British Army combatant corps used for light engineering tasks. The Royal Pioneer Corps was raised on 17 October 1939 as the Auxiliary Military Pioneer Corps. It was renamed the Pioneer Corps on 22 November 1940. It was renamed the Royal Pioneer Corps on 28 November 1946. On 5 April 1993, the Royal Pioneer Corps united with other units to form the Royal Logistic Corps.

The specialist pioneer units in the Royal Logistic Corps, 23 Pioneer Regiment, based at St David's Barracks at Bicester, and 168 Pioneer Regiment, headquartered in Prince William of Gloucester Barracks at Grantham, were disbanded in 2014, as part of the Army 2020 re-organisation.

The ARRC Support Battalion is based at Imjin Barracks, Innsworth (until June 2010, it was at Rheindahlen Military Complex, Germany)

All British infantry regiments still maintain assault pioneer units. The Pioneer Sergeant is the only rank allowed to wear a beard on parade.

== Israeli Army ==
The Israeli army has an infantry brigade called the Fighting Pioneer Youth, in Hebrew Noar Halutzi Lohem or just "Nahal". The title of Israeli military pioneers is a back-derivation from the civilian term. The Israeli army's pioneers were formed in 1948 from Jewish civilian pioneers, i.e. settlers, who were permitted to combine military service and farming.

== Pioneer units ==
=== United Kingdom ===
- Maltese Pioneers
- British Garrison at Calais Pioneers
- Pioneer Corps
- 4th (Pioneer) Battalion Coldstream Guards with the Guards Division, 1917 alternatively known as Guards Pioneer Battalion
- 6th East Yorkshire Regiment (Pioneer Battalion) with Division, 1917 (three company establishment)
- 3rd "Salford Pals" Battalion (19th Battalion, Lancashire Fusiliers) (converted to a pioneer battalion)
- 9th Battalion, Seaforth Highlanders Regiment (Pioneer Battalion) with 9th Division, 1917
- 1/6th Argyll and Sutherland Highlanders (Pioneer Battalion) with 5th Division, 1917
- 9th Battalion, South Staffordshire Regiment (Pioneer Battalion) with 23rd Division, 1917
- 9th Battalion, North Staffordshire Regiment (Pioneer Battalion) with 37th Division 1915–18
- 19th Battalion, Middlesex Regiment (Pioneer Battalion) with 41st Division, 1917
- 1/5th Royal Sussex Regiment (Pioneer Battalion) with 48th Division, 1917
- 8th (Pioneer) Battalion, Royal Sussex Regiment divisional pioneer battalion
- 12th (Pioneer) Battalion Sherwood Foresters
- Pioneer Battalion, The Royal Scots
- 19th Battalion (Pioneers), The Welsh Regiment (Glamorgan Pioneers)
- 15th (Pioneer) Battalion, the Royal Fusiliers (City of London Regiment) recruited at Oxford, Thame, Dover, Elham and Lyminge, Bude, Woolacombe and Truro areas during the Second World War
- 5th (Pioneer) Battalion, Cheshire Regiment was appointed "in consequence of earning a high reputation as diggers and as constructors of field works"
- 25th (Pioneer) Battalion, King's Royal Rifle Corps
- Pioneer Battalion, 5th Royal Irish Lancers, 1902 – 1922 was created to construct a new railway in the I Corps area on the Western Front.
- 1st Battalions Monmouthshire Regiment Territorial Force 11 November 1915: Pioneer Battalion of 46th Division, south west of Avesnes, France.
- 2nd Battalions Monmouthshire Regiment Territorial Force 1 May 1916: Joined 29th Division as Pioneer Battalion.
- 3rd Battalions Monmouthshire Regiment Territorial Force 28 September 1915: Became Pioneer Battalion, 28th Division.
- 16th (Pioneer) Battalion, Royal Irish Rifles
- 605th Pioneer Battalion, Pioneer Corps – used for light engineering tasks
- 606th Pioneer Battalion, Pioneer Corps – used for light engineering tasks
- 23 Pioneer Regiment, Royal Logistic Corps – Disbanded October 2014
- 168 Pioneer Regiment, Territorial Army- Disbanded April 2014

=== Australia ===
During World War I, Australia raised six pioneer battalions within the First Australian Imperial Force (1st AIF) for service on the Western Front, one per division:

- 1st Pioneer Battalion (New South Wales), 1st Division
- 2nd Pioneer Battalion (Western Australia), 2nd Division
- 3rd Pioneer Battalion (Victoria, Queensland, South Australia, Western Australia), 3rd Division
- 4th Pioneer Battalion (Queensland), 4th Division
- 5th Pioneer Battalion (South Australia), 5th Division
- 6th Pioneer Battalion, 6th Division (disbanded without seeing combat)

In World War II, four pioneer battalions were raised as part of the Second Australian Imperial Force (2nd AIF):

- 2/1 Australian Pioneer Battalion
- 2/2 Australian Pioneer Battalion
- 2/3 Australian Pioneer Battalion
- 2/4 Australian Pioneer Battalion

Other World War II pioneer units:

- 2/1st Special Pioneer Company (Formed in New South Wales in 1942 from the 9th Pioneer Training Battalion. Absorbed by 2/11th Army Troops Company in September 1943.)
- 2/2nd Special Pioneer Company (Formed in New South Wales in 1942 from the 9th Pioneer Training Battalion. Absorbed by 2/11th Army Troops Company in September 1943.)
- 3rd Special Pioneer Company (Formed in Victoria in March 1942. Redesignated 30th Employment Company in September 1942.)
- 2/4th Special Pioneer Company (Formed in Victoria in March 1942. Redesignated 29th Employment Company in September 1942.)
- 2/5th Pioneer Company (Formed in Victoria in March 1942. Redesignated 34th Infantry Training Battalion in May 1942.)
- 7th Special Pioneer Company (Formed in Queensland in April 1942 from the 7th Infantry Training Battalion. Disbanded September 1942.)
- 8th Special Pioneer Company (Formed in Queensland in April 1942 from the 29th Infantry Training Battalion. Disbanded September 1942.)
- 20th Pioneer Battalion (Formed by redesignation of the 20th Motor Regiment, February 1945. Disbanded September 1945)
- Torres Strait Pioneer Company (Formed from Torres Strait islanders, 1943. Disbanded January 1945)
- The Headquarters Companies of Infantry Battalions serving in the South West Pacific included Pioneer Platoons, giving Battalion Commanders the authority over deployment of Pioneer troops as required in combat pioneering, infantry combat or service roles.

=== Canada ===
- 2nd Canadian Pioneer Battalion, Canadian Expeditionary Force with over a thousand men whose training gave them a combination of engineering and infantry skills.
- 48th Battalion served in the field as the 3rd Canadian Pioneer Battalion (48th Canadians), with the 3rd Canadian Division
- 67th "Western Scots" (Pioneer Battalion), Canadian Expeditionary Force, 1916
- 107th Pioneer Battalion
- 123rd Infantry Battalion repurposed as a Pioneer Battalion in January 1917, and replaced the 3rd Pioneer Battalion in May 1917 as the Pioneer Battalion of the 3rd Canadian Division
- 124th Infantry Battalion repurposed as a Pioneer Battalion in January 1917, and became the Pioneer Battalion of the 4th Canadian Division

=== New Zealand ===
- The New Zealand Pioneer Battalion, sometimes referred to as the Pioneer Māori Battalion. The battalion included four companies, each with two Māori and two European (Pākehā) platoons, and included remnants of the Otago Mounted Rifle Regiment.

=== South Africa ===
- South African Army Pioneer Battalion

=== India ===
For Indian Army Pioneer Corps, see also Indian Army Pioneer Corps

British Indian Army Pioneer Battalions enlisted, drilled and trained as any other native infantry battalion of the line, but received additional construction training.

- 1st Madras Pioneers, Indian Army
- 2nd Bombay Pioneers, Indian Army
- 3rd Sikh Pioneers, Indian Army
- 4th Hazara Pioneers, Indian Army

=== Other commonwealth countries ===
- African Pioneer Corps

=== Nepal ===
- 1st Jangi Auxiliary Pioneer Battalion (1000 strong), Nepalese Army
- Jagannath Auxiliary Pioneer Battalion, Nepalese Army

=== France ===
- The Foreign Legion Pionniers, members of the Foreign Legion, open all the Legion's parades as a matter of tradition. They grow full beards, wear leather aprons and carry axes during these parades.

=== Germany ===
First World War
Imperial German Army pioneers (Pioniere) were regarded as a separate combat arm trained in construction and the demolition of fortifications, but they were often used as specialist infantry, serving the role of combat engineers. One battalion was assigned to each Corps.
- The Guard Pioneer Battalion 1. (6 companies, each with 20 large and 18 small flame-throwers)
- The Guard Pioneer Battalion 2.
- The Guard Pioneer Battalion 3.
- The Guard Reserve Pioneer Battalion – created from reservists who had been civilian firemen, the battalion was issued with experimental flame-throwers
- 1st Bavarian Pioneer Battalion, First Bavarian Division (12 destruction squads)
- 2nd Bavarian Pioneer Battalion
Prussian Army pioneer battalions:
- 1 Prussian Pioneer Battalion of the Guards – 3 Field companies, one Reserve company
- 12 Prussian Pioneer Battalions of the Line (18 officers, 495 men and 6 other people)
  - 2nd Pioneer Battalion at Stettin
  - 4th Pioneer Battalion at Magdeburg
- Saxon Pioneer Battalion
World War Two
German Army Pionier battalions:
- Panzer-Pionier-Bataillon (armoured pioneer battalion performing engineering tasks during an assault from manoeuvre)
- Sturmpionierbataillon (assault pioneer battalion performing engineering tasks during an infantry assault)
- Gebirgs-Pionier-Bataillon 95, a pioneer unit trained for the mountain terrain
- Pionier-Bataillon 233 (divisional pioneer unit)
- Heeres-Pionier-Bataillon 73 (Corps pioneer unit)
- Pioneer Battalion, Leibstandarte SS Adolf Hitler, Waffen-SS
- Pioneer Battalions, Estonian Auxiliary Police

=== Russia ===
- 1st Pioneer Battalion, Imperial Russian Army
- 2nd Pioneer Battalion, Imperial Russian Army
- 3rd Pioneer Battalion (later 5th Pioneer Battalion), Imperial Russian Army
- 4th Pioneer Battalion, Imperial Russian Army

=== United States ===
- First Pioneer Battalion of Engineers, Mounted, United States Army (1st Bn. mtd. Engra.) (3 companies)
- First Pioneer Battalion of Engineers, United States Army (1st Bn. Engrs.) (3 companies)
- First Pioneer Infantry, United States Army (Companies A – M)
- 9th Pioneer Battalion, US Army
- 18th Reserve Pioneer Battalion, US Army
- Jefferson County Pioneer Battalion, Pennsylvania (CO Lieutenant-Colonel, Hance Robinson)
- Red Patch
- 1st Pioneer Battalion, United States Marine Corps
- 2nd Pioneer Battalion, United States Marine Corps
- 3rd Pioneer Battalion, United States Marine Corps
- 4th Pioneer Battalion, United States Marine Corps
- 5th Pioneer Battalion, United States Marine Corps (deactivated in November 1969)
- 31st Naval Construction Battalion TAD as USMC Pioneers 5th Shore Party Regiment, 5th Marine Division (decommissioned)
- 71st Naval Construction Battalion TAD as USMC Pioneers 3rd Marine Division (decommissioned)
- 133rd Naval Construction Battalion TAD as USMC Pioneers to 23rd Marines, now called "Naval Mobile Construction Battalion 133"

== See also ==
- Combat engineer
