= Hazara Pioneers =

Hazara Pioneers may refer to:

- 4th Hazara Pioneers
- 106th Hazara Pioneers
- 108th Hazara Pioneers
