= Rawalpindi Parade 1905 =

The Rawalpindi Parade 1905 was a parade by the British Indian Army held in Rawalpindi on 8 December 1905 to honour the Prince and Princess of Wales. The troops were under the Command of Horatio Herbert, Viscount Kitchener of Khartoum, G.C.B., O.M., G.C.M.G., Commander-in-Chief India. The Royal party arrived at the parade ground escorted by a Field Officer's escort of 1st Skinner's Horse. They then received a Royal salute and inspected the troops, accompanied by the Commander-in-chief. On conclusion of the inspection, the troops on parade marched past in the following order.

== Order of the march past ==
- Viscount Kitchener of Khartoum, Commander-in-Chief India
- Major General Douglas Haig, Inspector-General of Cavalry in India
- 1st (Peshawar) Infantry Brigade - Major General C. H. Des Voeux
- Royal Horse Artillery
  - F Battery
  - I Battery
  - J Battery
  - T Battery
- 1st Cavalry Brigade - Brigadier General Robert Bellew Adams V.C.
  - 22nd Sam Browne's Cavalry
  - 23rd Cavalry
  - Queens Own Corp of Guides Cavalry
- 2nd Cavalry Brigade - Colonel F.S. Garratt
  - 12th Royal Lancers
  - 8th Cavalry
  - 9th Hodson's Horse
- 3rd Cavalry Brigade - Colonel A. Phayre
  - 9th Queen's Royal Lancers
  - 7th Hariana Lancers
  - 11th Prince of Wales Own Lancers
- 4th Cavalry Brigade - Brigadier General B.T. Mahon
  - 3rd The King's Own Hussars
  - 13th Duke of Connaught's Lancers
  - 15th Lancers (Cureton's Multanis)
- Divisional Cavalry Regiments
  - 19th Lancers (Fane's Horse)
  - 1st Duke of York's Own Lancers
  - 25th Cavalry
  - 12th Cavalry
- Mounted Infantry
  - No. 1 Company
  - No. 2 Company
- Royal Artillery Brigadier-General J.A. Coxhead
- Royal Field Artillery
- 1st Brigade
  - 13th Battery
  - 67th Battery
  - 69th Battery
- 39th Brigade
  - 46th Battery
  - 51st Battery
  - 54th Battery
- 45th Brigade
  - 11th Battery
  - 52nd Battery
  - 80th Battery
- Royal Garrison Artillery
- Mountain Division
  - 5th Mountain Battery
  - 6th Mountain Battery
  - 8th Mountain Battery
  - 21st Mountain Battery
  - 22nd Mountain Battery
  - 24th Mountain Battery
  - 26th Mountain Battery
  - 27th Mountain Battery
  - 28th Mountain Battery
- Royal Garrison Artillery
  - 71st Company (Heavies)
  - 104th Company (Heavies)
- Sappers and Miners Colonel A.E. Sandbach
  - 1 Company, 1st Sappers and Miners
  - 2 Company, 1st Sappers and Miners
  - 4 Company, 1st Sappers and Miners
  - 5 Company, 1st Sappers and Miners
  - 9 Company, 1st Sappers and Miners
- Telegraph Section, 1st S & M
  - 2nd S & P
  - 3rd S & M
- Telephone Section 1st S & P
- 1st (Peshawar) Division Lieutenant General Sir, E. Barrow
  - 1st Seaforth Highlanders
  - 2nd Gordon Highlanders
  - 36th Sikhs
  - 38th Dogras
- 2nd (Nowshera) Infantry Brigade - Brigadier General Sir James Willcocks
  - 1st The Cameronians (Scottish Rifles)
  - 25th Punjabis
  - 45th Rattray Sikhs
  - 54th Sikhs
- 3rd (Frontier) Infantry Brigade - Colonel Fenton Aylmer, V.C.
  - 52nd Sikhs
  - 53rd Sikhs
  - 59th Scinde Rifles
  - Queens Own Corps of Guides
- Divisional Battalion
  - 4th Prince Albert Victor's Rajputs
- 2nd (Rawalpindi) Division Major General. J.H. Wodehouse
- 5th (Jhelum) Infantry Brigade - Colonel. Henry Buckley Burton Watkis
  - 25th Punjabis
  - 30th Punjabis
  - 56th Infantry
  - 58th Vaughan's Rifles
- 6th (Abbottabad) Infantry Brigade - Major General John Blaxell Woon
  - 1st 5th Gurkha Rifles
  - 2nd 5th Gurkha Rifles
  - 1st 6th Gurkha Rifles
  - 2nd 6th Gurkha Rifles
- 4th (Rawalpindi) Infantry Brigade - Colonel. C.W. Park
  - 1st The Queen's (Royal West Surrey Regiment)
  - 1st Royal Irish Regiment
  - 1st Royal Munster Fusiliers
  - 2nd Royal Irish Fusiliers
- Divisional Battalion
  - 23rd Pioneers
- 3rd (Lahore) Division Major General Walter Kitchener
- 7th (Mian Mir) Infantry Brigade - Colonel W. Du Gray
  - 1st Northamptonshire Regiment
  - 20th Duke of Cambridge's Own Infantry (Brownlow's Punjabis)
  - 21st Punjabis
  - 40th Pathans
- 8th (Ferozepore) Infantry Brigade - Brigadier General H.A. Abbott
  - 1st Dorsetshire Regiment
  - 14th Ferozepore Sikhs
  - 15th Ludhiana Sikhs
  - 19th Punjabis
- 9th (Baklok) Infantry Brigade - Brigadier General J.A Pollock
  - 1st 1st Gurkha Rifles (The Maluan Regt)
  - 2nd 1st Gurkha Rifles (The Maluan Regt)
  - 1st 4th Gurkha Rifles
  - 2nd 4th Gurkha Rifles
- Divisional Battalion
  - 34th Sikh Pioneers
- 4th (Quetta) Division Major General Sir O'Moore Creagh. V.C.
- 11th (Derajat) Infantry Brigade - Colonel C.A. Anderson
  - 22nd Punjabis
  - 29th Punjabis
  - 55th Coke's Rifles
  - 78th Moplah Rifles
- 12 (Garwhal) Infantry Brigade - Major General A.C.F. Browne
  - 2nd King's Royal Rifles
  - 1st Royal Irish Rifles
  - 1st 2nd Prince of Wales Own Gurkha Rifles
  - 2nd 2nd Prince of Wales Own Gurkha Rifles
- 10th (Sirkind) Infantry Brigade - Major General R.A.P. Clements
  - 1st Royal Sussex Regiment
  - 1st Gloucestershire Regiment
  - 2nd North Staffordshire Regiment
  - 1st Wiltshire Regiment
- Divisional Battalion
  - 32nd Sikh Pioneers
