= 11th Madras Native Infantry =

11th Madras Native Infantry may refer to:

- 1st Battalion, 11th Madras Native Infantry which became the 81st Pioneers
- 2nd Battalion, 11th Madras Native Infantry which became the 82nd Punjabis
