= 32nd Bengal Native Infantry =

32nd Bengal Native Infantry could refer to the:

- 3rd Brahmans in 1824
- 34th Sikh Pioneers in 1861
