= Mazhabi Sikh =

Community from Northern India that follows Sikhism

- Religions: Sikhism
- Languages: Punjabi
- Populated states: Punjab, Rajasthan, Haryana

Mazhabi Sikh, also known as Rangreta Sikhs, are a community from Northern India, especially Punjab region, who follow Sikhism. Mazhabi are part of wider category of Sikhs, who are of a Chuhra (Valmiki) caste background. The word Mazhabi (Note: There are various ways to spell the word, such as Mazbhabi, Mazbhi, Majhabhi or Majabhi.) is derived from the Arabic term Mazhab (meaning religion or sect), and can be translated as the faithful. They live mainly in Indian Punjab, Rajasthan and Haryana. The Mazhabi Sikhs and other Dalit Sikhs are often marginalized today by dominant Sikh castes, such as the Jats.

== Terminology ==
There are various terms to refer to this caste grouping based on religion, with them being known as Chuhras by Hindus, as Musalli or Kutana by Muslims, and as Mazhabis or Rangretas by Sikhs. Other terms are Bhangi or Mehta.

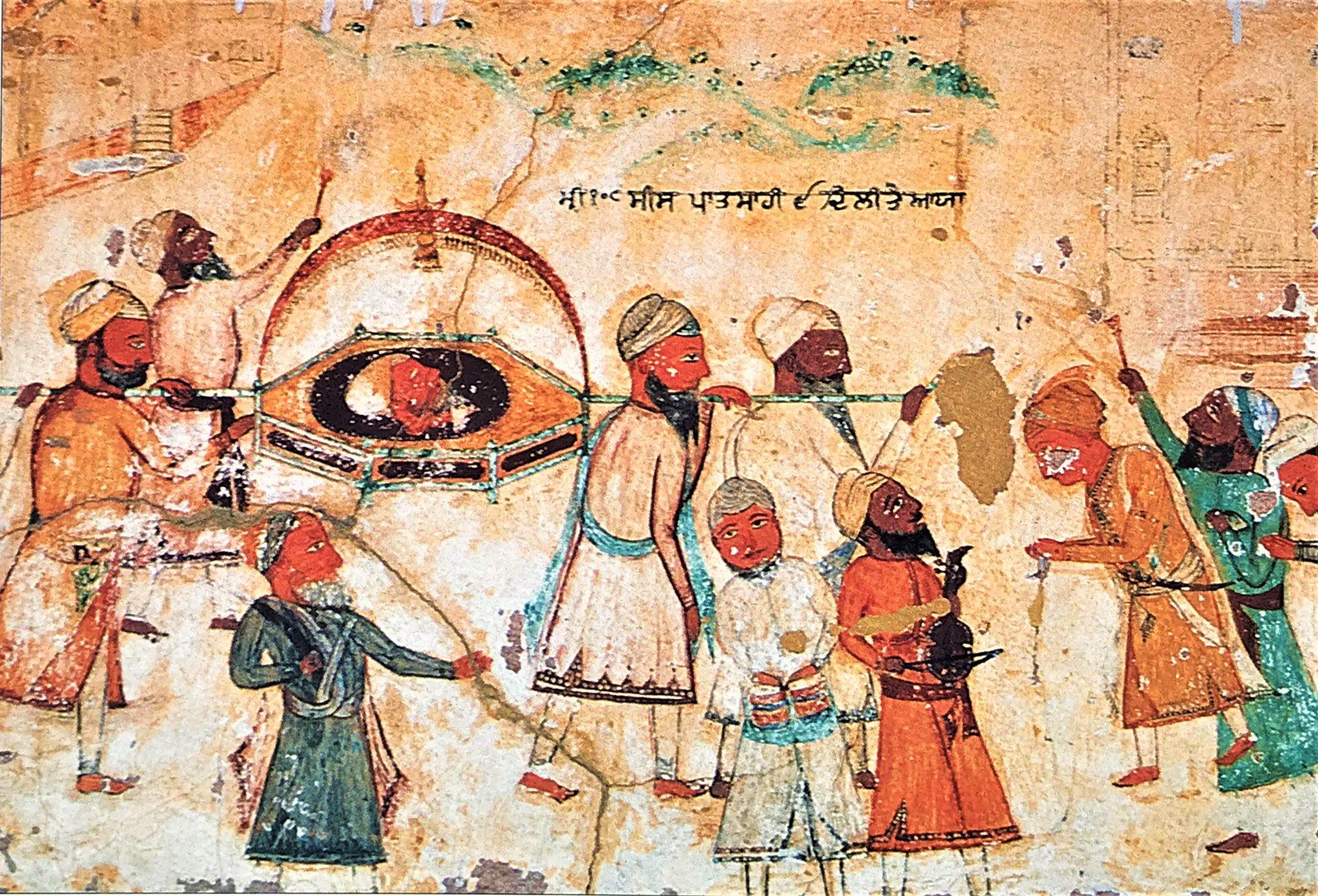
A fresco painting of the scene from Anandpur Sahib where Guru Gobind Singh bows to the sis (head) of Guru Tegh Bahadur which was brought in palanquin, led by Bhai Jaita.

When Guru Tegh Bahadur, the ninth Sikh guru, was executed by the Mughals in Delhi, it is believed that a Mazhabi Sikh, named Bhai Jaita, recovered his dismembered body from a Muslim crowd and brought it back to his son, Guru Gobind Singh. In recognition of their act, he admitted the untouchables into the Khalsa (the Sikh faith), giving them the name Mazhabi ("faithful").

== History ==
=== Origin ===
Mazhabis/Rangretas originate from Chuhra converts to Sikhism. Chuhras were the sweeping and scavenger caste in historical times. When they converted to Sikhism, they became known by new terms and often changed occupations. The Chuhras of Punjab were concentrated mostly in the eastern part of the Punjab Plains, especially in the Majha region, with their numbers being few west of Lahore, with notable exceptions being Rawalpindi, Multan, and Peshawar.

As per oral traditions, the Chuhras began converting to Sikhism more earnestly no later than during the period of the tenth Sikh guru, Guru Gobind Singh. One early account is of the tenth guru honouring a Chuhra Sikh, though in other accounts it was two brothers, who brought the head of Guru Tegh Bahadur to Anandpur from Delhi after much hardship. The popular account involves a prominent Rangreta Sikh was Bhai Jiwan Singh (Bhai Jaita), who secured the severed head of Guru Tegh Bahadur after his execution in Delhi in 1675 and brought it to Guru Gobind Singh at Anandpur. For this feat, the tenth guru declared the Rangretas as Ranghrete Guru ke Bete ("the Rangretas are Guru's sons"). Furthermore, the Rangretas were accorded special status in regards to ablutions at the Amrit Sarovar of the Golden Temple.

The conversion process of a Chuhra becoming a Sikh was simple, with them merely having "to assume the motto of Nanak Shah" (Nanak Shah ka mantra lana). The conversion process for Chuhras joining the Sikh religion involved a secret mantra, a communal feast of members of the same caste, and a prayer conducted by the sponsor for the candidate. Whilst some Chuhra Sikhs underwent the pahul baptismal ceremony to the Khalsa, there were varying degrees of adherence to established or ordained Sikh beliefs and practices, evolving over time, with some Chuhra Sikhs forgoing keeping kesh and participating in smoking, whilst others more strictly adhered to keeping kesh, wearing a kara, having a kanga, or keeping other articles of the Sikh faith. Some Chuhras outside of Punjab, such as in Poona and Benaras were also influenced by Sikhism. Aside from Hindu Chuhras and Sikh Chuhras, there were also Muslim Chuhras, with those whose ancestor(s) originally converting at an earlier historical period being known as Sekras or Sheikh Halalkhors, with those whose ancestor(s) converted at a latter time in history being known as Musalli, Kutana, or Dindar. Historically, conversions to Islam was usually a community-wide event, with entire caste-groups converting together, rather than on an individual basis.

Garja Singh, the companion of the 18th century martyr Bota Singh who was martyred alongside him, was a Rangreta Sikh.

=== Colonial period ===
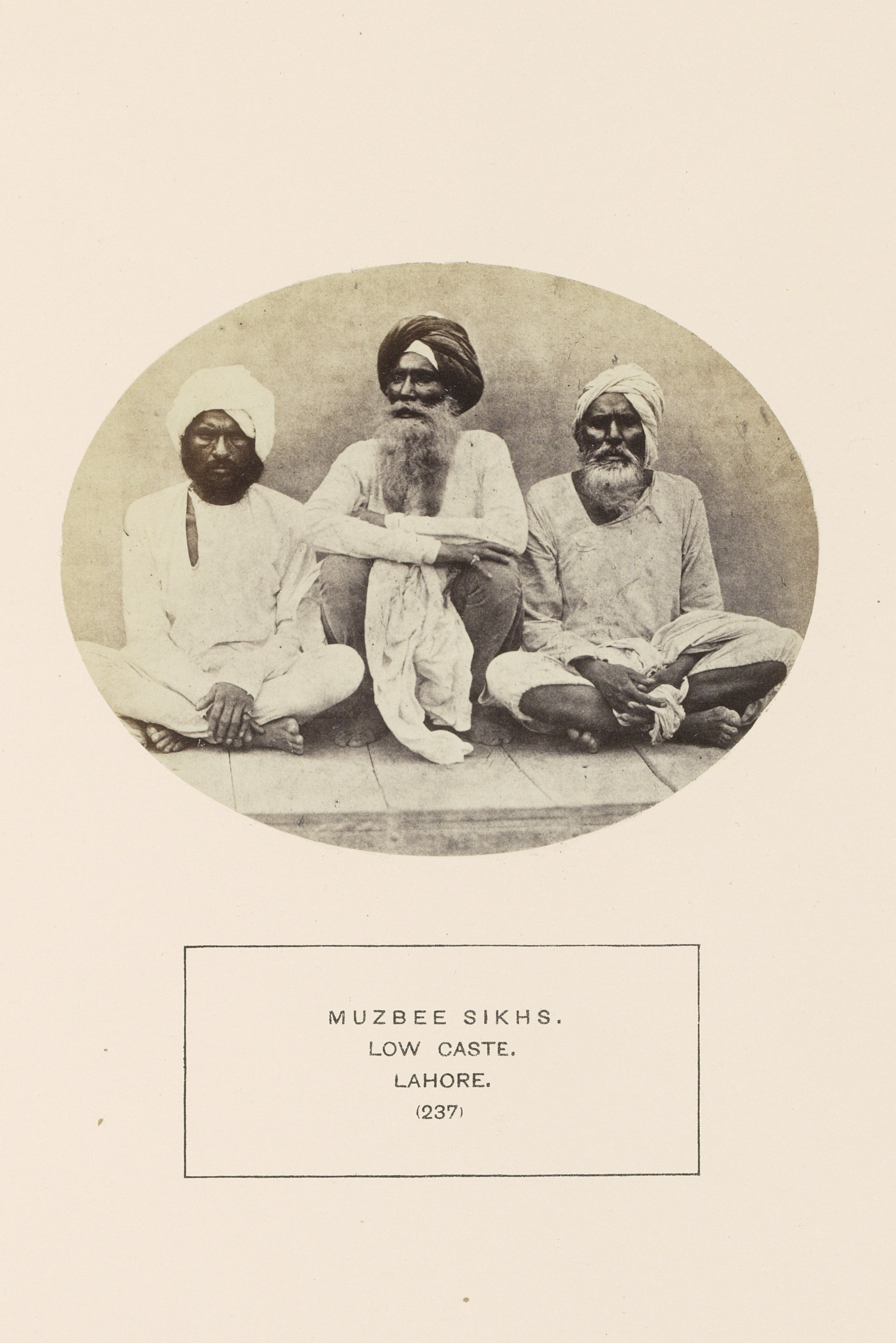
Portrait of three unknown Mazhabi Sikh men from Lahore, ca.1862–72

During the colonial-era, the syncretic nature of the religious beliefs and practices of the Chuhras (mixing in aspects of Hinduism, Islam, and Sikhism) and their tendency to worship saints, was noted. Many Chuhras were originally followers of the cult of Lal Beg, known as the Lal Begi tradition. The colonial-era writers had a negative attitude to religious traditions they deemed as "syncretic", seeing them as impurities of organized religions and therefore not legitimate, instead of realizing that all religious traditions are ultimately syncretic fundamentally. Richard C. Temple stated the following on their religious customs:

This religion may be best styled hagiolatry pure and simple, as it consists merely of a confused veneration for anything and everything its followers, or rather their teachers, may have found to be considered sacred by their neighbours, whatever be its origin. Thus we find in the Panjab that in the religion of the scavenger castes the tenets of the Hindus, the Musalmans and the Sikhs are thrown together in the most hopeless confusion.

— R. C. Temple, The Legends of the Panjab (1884), page 529

Hervey DeWitt Griswold noted that Chuhras serving Muslim landlords tended to adopt Muslim customs whilst those serving Sikh landlords adopted Sikh ones. This concept was referred to as jaisā rājā vaisī prajā ("as the king, so the people") by some Chuhras in the Sitapur area. The religious traditions of the Chuhras involved:

- veneration of chthonic goddesses (such as Mari Mata and Purvi Mata), Muslim pirs (such as Waris Ali Shah), and divinized heroes, such as Zahir Pir, Ghazi Miyan, and Khandoba
- animal-sacrifice, with the executioner usually having a more Islamic-identity
- connection with a loosely-connected network of peripatetic mendicants (bhagats or gurus), some of whom were Udasis, Nanakpanthi, or educated in the Sikh religion, thus being formally-identifiable as Sikh.

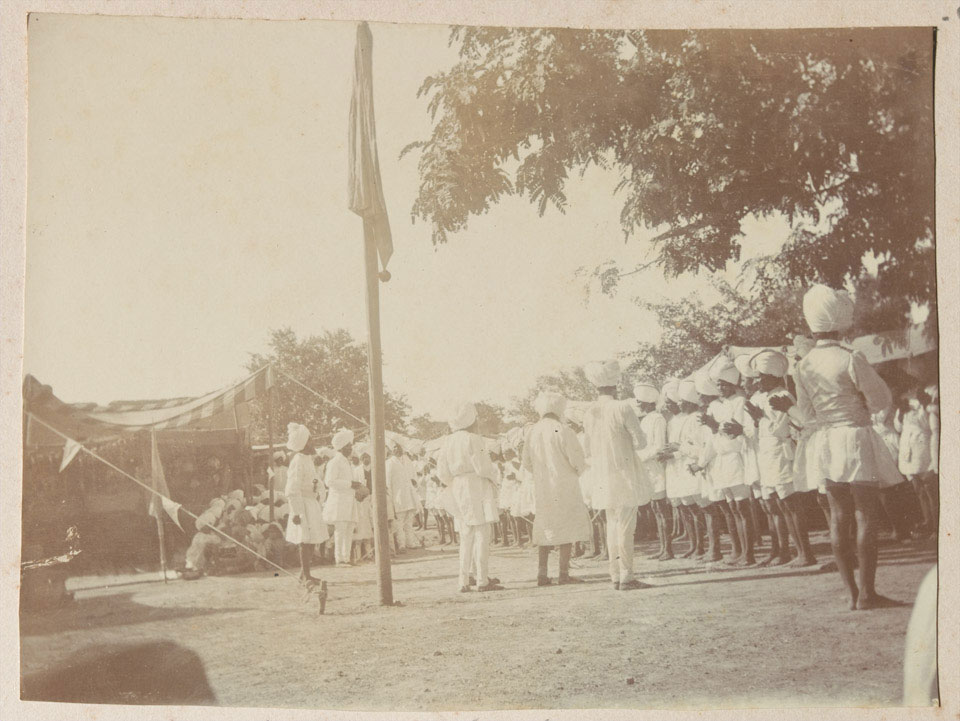
Photograph of recruits to the 34th Sikh Pioneers undergoing the Pahul enlistment ritual, ca.1905

Hindu Dalits were motivated to convert to Sikhism, Christianity, and Islam due to the perceived absence of the caste-system in these religious traditions. However, in-reality Dalits continued to face discrimination even after converting to these religions as the local manifestations of these religions in the subcontinent have been influenced by the Indian caste-system and also perpetrate casteism. Although the Mazhabi Sikhs resembled the Jat Sikhs in their practices and mannerisms, they were still discriminated against and excluded by the latter. Thus, the contradictive reality for the Mazhabi Sikhs was although the Sikh religion espouses egaliteranian tenets in its ideology, in practice many Sikhs continue to perpetrate casteism discrimination, which continued inequalities.

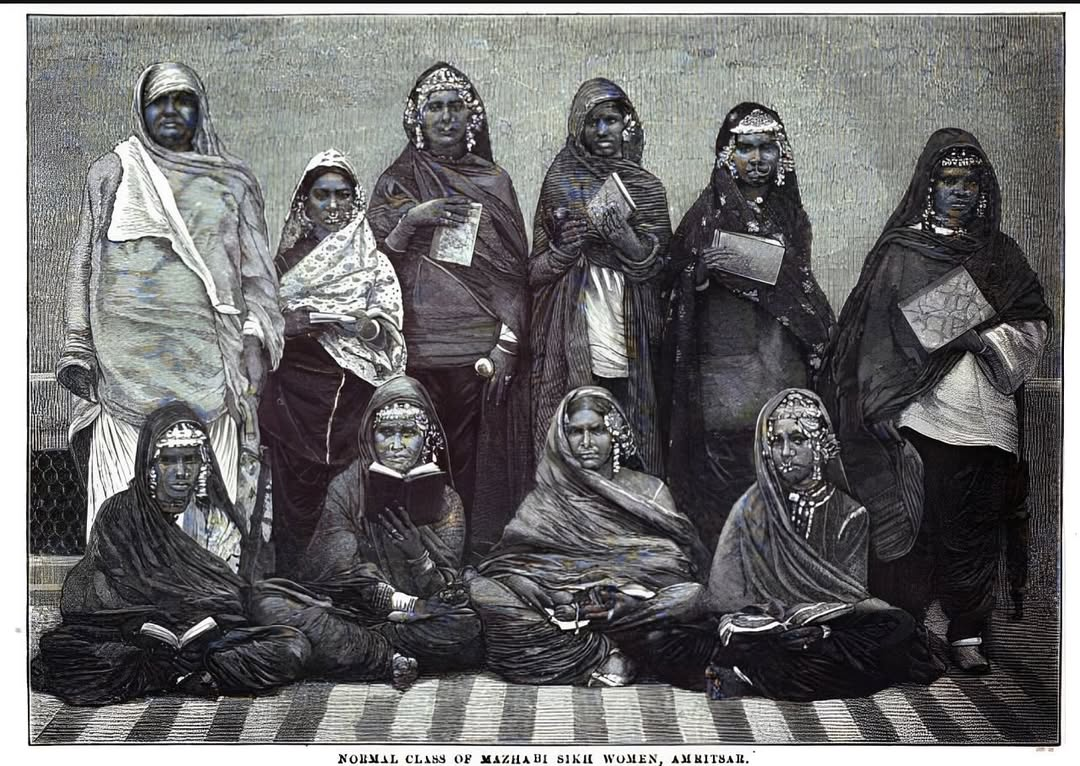
'Normal Class of Mazhabi Sikh Women, Amritsar.', lithograph based upon a photograph, 1889

During the colonial-period, a substantial amount of Mazhabi Sikhs in Punjab and the western part of the United Provinces converted to Christianity. The process of conversion is noted as initially being instigated by the Chuhras themselves rather than by the missionaries, as it was the Chuhras who approached the missionaries first. The missionaries were initially targeting the privileged castes for conversion but began to focus on converting the lower-castes due to the numbers of Chuhras entering the Christian religion in this period. The conversion of Mazhabi Sikhs to Christianity started in western U.P. in 1859 and in Punjab from 1873 onwards. It was primarily the Presbyterian Mission was successful at converting Mazhabis to Christianity, although other Christian denominations also saw converts into their fold. Eventually, the majority of native Christians were those from the labour castes, with the term "sweeper" and "Christian" becoming synonymous for one another in Western U.P. by the year 1900 and in post-partition Pakistani Punjab after 1947. By 1931, nearly a quarter of all the Chuhras in Punjab had become Christians, with them being especially prevalented in western Punjab, in areas that would later become Pakistani Punjab. However, many of the Chuhras that became Christian did not discard all of their previous beliefs and practices, known as pahchān. The Christian churches referred to the Chuhra masses converting to their religion as "Mass Movement Christians" or "village Christians" due to them being subaltern converts, and noted their laxity in following Christian tenets. Due to this, Chuhra Christians became a sub-class of Christians who were usually not deemed as fit to partake in the communion. Many other native Christians also opposed the Chuhras joining their church, such as in Amritsar. Non-Dalit native Christians (often upper-caste Christians) termed the Dalit Christian converts as "neo-Christians" and casteism de facto continued amongst the Indian Christian community, with Dalit Christians continuing to marry amongst themselves, their separate Dalit identity continuing, and preserving their Dalit diction. In some cases, the Dalit Christians were segregated within the churches, being allotted separate seats.

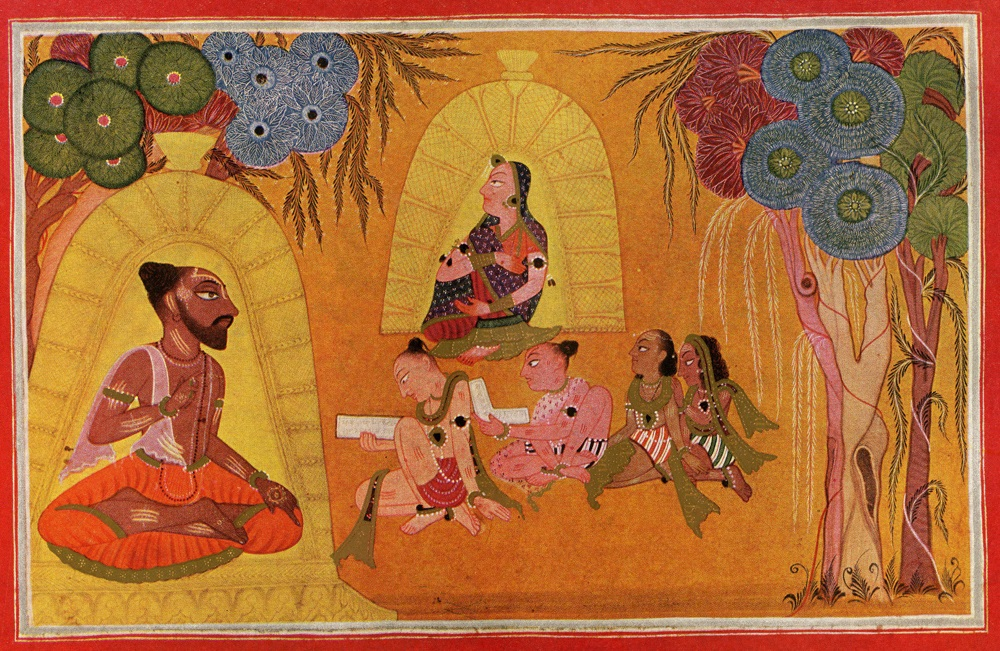
Sita, Lava, and Kusha in the hermitage of Valmiki. By the Master of Style I of the ‘Shangri’. Ramayana, ca.1670–8. Valmiki is revered as Lal Beg amongst the Chuhras.

Many Chuhra converts continued to practice their ancestral religious practices and folk religion, such as the cult of Lal Beg. Thus, a sign that a Chuhra community who all became Christian truly adhered to their new faith was by them destroying their old shrine (known as a than) dedicated to Lal Beg as a test to validate that they truly had become Christians, although their Christian-ness was still doubted even if they had done so. Conversion to Christianity was also marked by a discarding of the traditional occupations that characterized their caste and an aspiration for owning land and achieving educational-attainment. Mazhabis who converted to Christianity altered their work activities to "perform only the least offensive parts of their traditional duties". Due to Mazhabis and other Chuhras becoming Christians, there were fewer people carrying out the scavenger roles in many areas, which led to tensions, as this was an occupational rebellion by the newly converted. As a result, some landlords (zamindars) attempted to limit any interactions between Chuhras and missionaries in their area or punish the Chuhras who had become Christians, such as by exiling them and appropriating their plots of land. Other tactics used to prevent Chuhras converting to Christianity were intimidation tactics, beatings, and kidnapping of family-members.

Many Chuhras also became Muslims, with the proportion of Muslim Chuhras rising from 20% in 1891 to 31% by 1911 as per the censuses. However, Muslim organizations did not actively seek out Chuhra converts until the Shuddhi controversy in the 1920s. During this period, the Chuhras of Punjab also experienced hostility from the Ahmadiyya movement, with Mirza Ghulam Ahmad rejecting the notion that any Chuhras were amongst his followers.

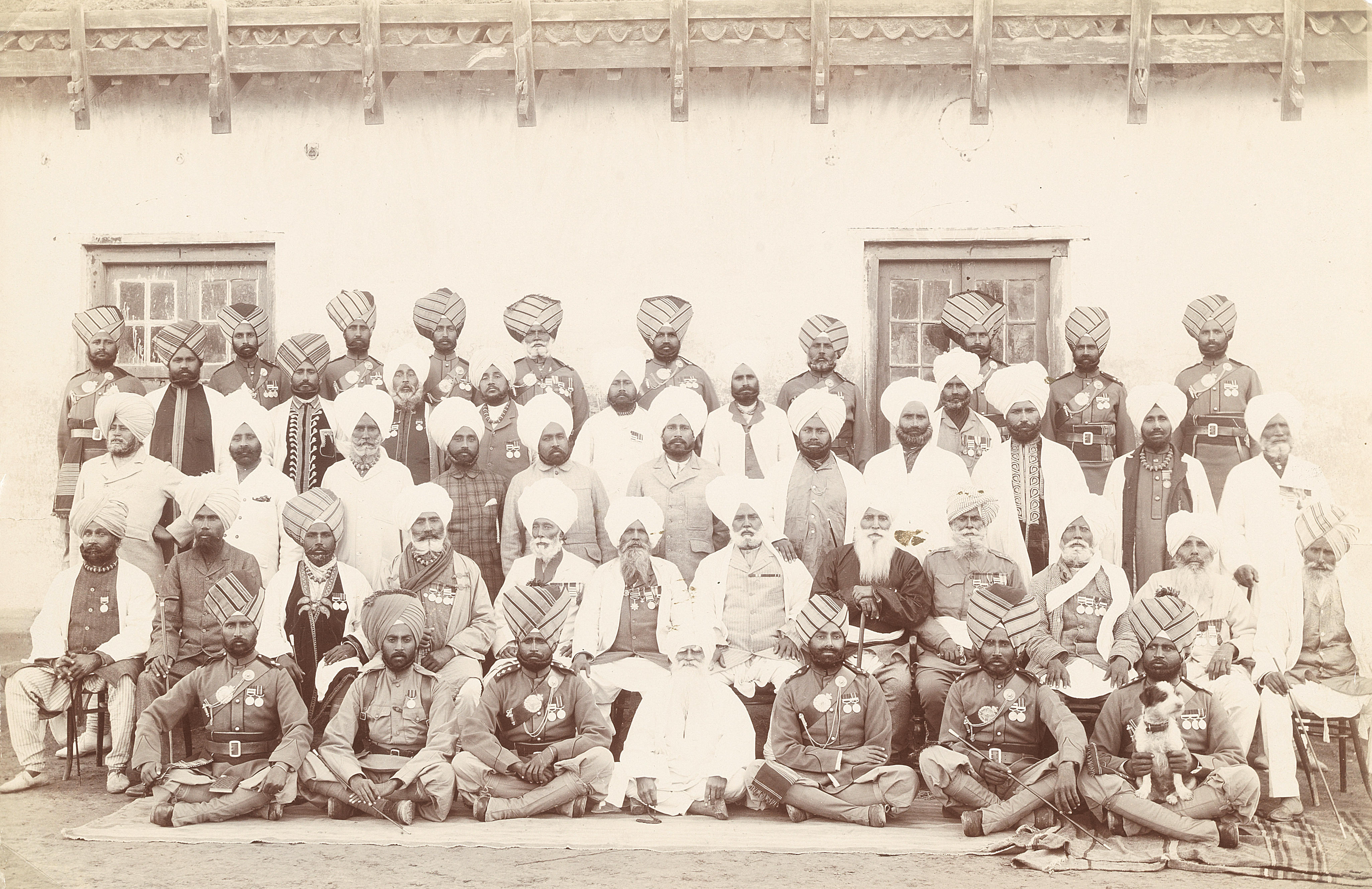
Group photograph of the 23rd Sikh Pioneer Regiment posing with Sikh war veterans of the Indian Rebellion of 1857, circa late 19th century. This regiment consisted largely of Mazhbi Sikhs.

Mazhabis were recruited into the British Indian Army, with some regiments being dedicated to them.

=== Post-independence ===
Between 30,000 and 40,000 Mazhabi Sikhs were reported to be congregated at Govindghar in an attempt to reach India during the Partition of India and Pakistan in 1947. This was one of many examples of the mass migrations that took place across the border in both directions as communities found themselves in the midst of violence driven by religious differences.

Due to the discrimination faced by Mazhabi Sikhs in mainstream Sikh organizations and spaces, many of them have sought acceptance by joining various sant mat movements or dera organizations, such the Radha Soamis or Dera Sacha Sauda, and also Sikh sects, such as Namdharis and Nirankaris. During the Punjab insurgency, there was a Mazhabi outfit referred to as the Rangreta Dal, founded by Buta Singh. Today, the caste system amongst Sikhs operates differently from the rest of India. While notions of purity/impurity regarding touch, contact, and sharing food are not prevalent amongst Sikhs, other aspects of the caste-system continues amongst the Sikhs, chiefly regarding hierarchies between sub-groups and communities based upon occupation and land-ownership continues. Furthermore, gurdwara are often segregated based upon caste lineages, kin networks, and region due to the prevalence of endogamy amongst Sikh groups. The Mazhabis/Rangretas and other Dalit Sikh groups, such as the Valmikis, Ad-Dharmis, and Ramdasias/Ravidassias, are therefore stigmatized as they usually landless, disenfranchised, and excluded from many aspects of the Sikh community in the subcontinent and the diaspora, which is dominated chiefly by the Jats. In recent-decades, many Mazhabi Sikhs in Indian Punjab have converted to Christianity due to the influence of independent pastors/churches. Dalit Christians are not entitled to reservations in jobs and educational institutions.

== Divisions ==
Within the present-day Mazhabi community, one group calls itself the Ranghreta and claims a higher status on the grounds that one of their ancestors was Bhai Jaita Ranghreta, who carried the head of Tegh Bahadur from Delhi to Guru Gobind Singh in Anandpur Sahib On seeing this act of bravery and self renunciation Guru Gobind Singh uttered "Ranghreta Guru ka beta", which means Ranghreta is son of Guru.

The definition of Mazhabi today is somewhat blurred because of the influence of Valmikism. While Sikhism is in theory an egalitarian faith that takes no notice of caste, gender and other social demarcations, Fenech and Singh note that "there is often a level of hypocrisy between what is taught and what is actually put into practice." Mazhabis are discriminated against by Sikhs whose origins lie with higher-ranked castes and many Chuhras have turned to Valmikism but are still referred to as Mazhabi. While young Valmikis, who accept Valmiki as their guru, increasingly object to being labelled as Sikh, their elders are less concerned. (Note: The vagueness of the Mazhabi-Valmiki relationship was exemplified by tribunal rulings in 1953 and 1955, where an election candidate variously declared himself as a Harijan Hindu, a Mazhabi Sikh, a Valmiki, and a Valmiki Hindu. The first ruling determined him to be Valmiki Hindu and the subsequent one decided he was Mazhabi Sikh.) At least one of their organisations, the Valmiki-Mazhabi Sikh Morcha, conflates the terms.

Mazhabis who converted from Sikhism to Christianity under the influence of Christian missionaries in the later years of the British Raj are sometimes referred to as Christian Mazhabi Sikhs. Some also profess Hinduism but call themselves Mazhabi, as do a small number who follow the tenets of Buddhism.

There are two main groups of Dalit Sikhs, the Mazhabis/Rangretas (originate from Chuhras) and Ramdasias/Ravidassias (originate from Chamars). These two groups are not seen as equals, with the Chamar-derived group seeing themselves as superior to the Chuhra-derived group in the caste-hierarchy.

One of the four factions of the Nihangs is the Rangreta Dal, which is associated with Mazhabi Sikhs.

== Military service ==
=== Before the British Raj era ===
The Mazhabis were recruited to the army of Ranjit Singh but as separate companies attached to regular battalions rather than as part of an integrated force. This situation was forced upon him because high-caste Sikhs refused any closer connection. They served as pioneers, operating mainly as a labour corps that worked on construction of roads, bridges and canals. They were not, however, mere labourers because it was expected that their infantry skills would enable them to defend themselves in the event of attack.

=== British Raj ===
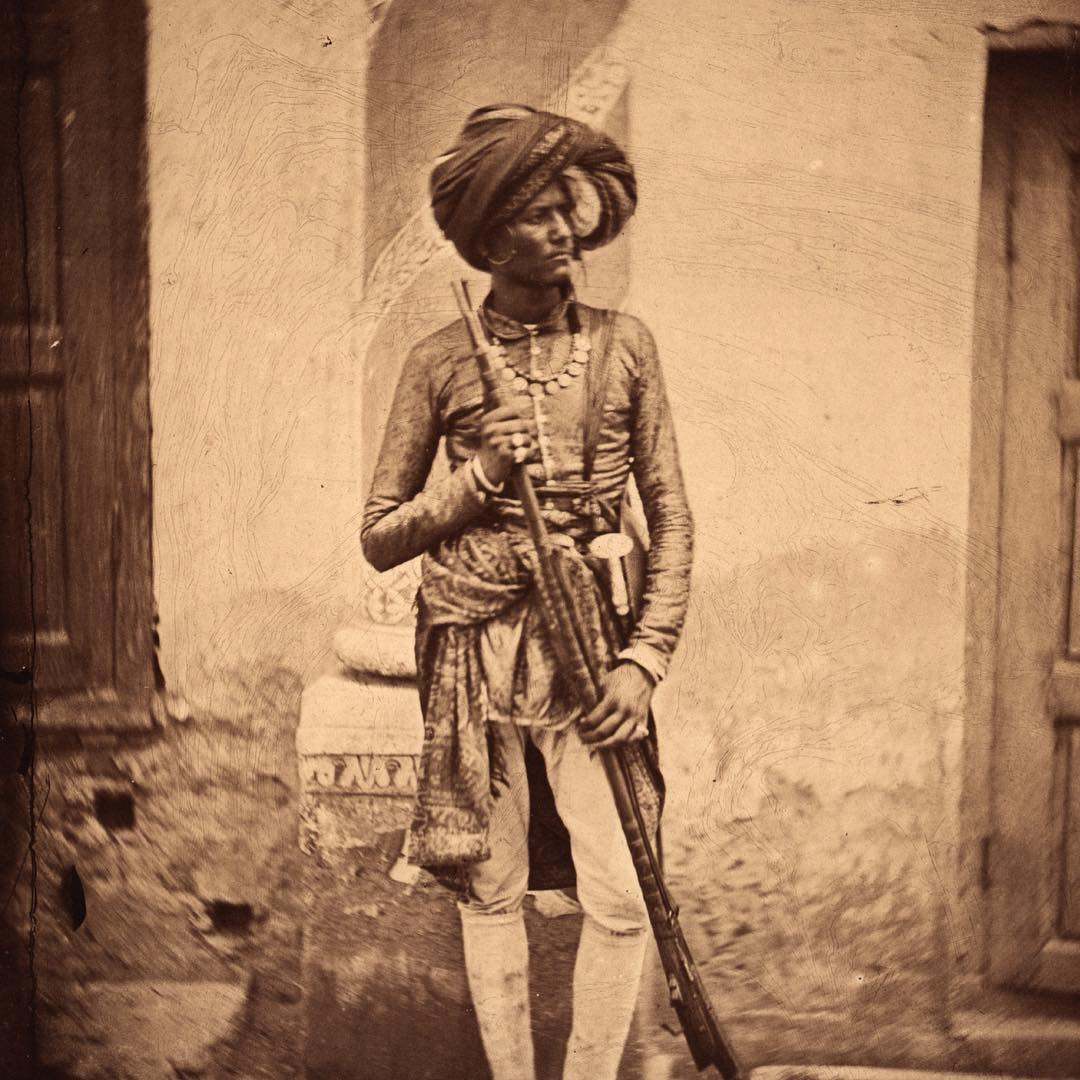
A Mazabhi Sikh trooper of the 15th Punjab Infantry after the sacking of Kaisarbagh Palace, by Felice Beato, Lucknow, March or April 1858

The Mazhabis, whom historian Stephen Cohen says "had strong caste traditions of violence and aggressiveness and were classed as a criminal caste by the British", (Note: H. Brereton, the Superintendent of Thuggee Investigations, said in 1852 that most of the Thugs in Punjab were Mazhabi.) lost their military employment following the defeat of the Sikhs in the First and Second Anglo-Sikh Wars. Some eventually found employment as pioneers in the army of Gulab Singh, the Maharaja of Jammu and Kashmir. In 1857, the British turned to them for help during the Indian Rebellion, apparently to counteract the rebellious sepoys of the Bengal Army. The First Pioneer Sikh Regiment soon found itself helping to break the Siege of Delhi, a second regiment was raised in 1858 and a third followed soon after. This military employment contributed to a gradual improvement in their social status and in 1911 their official classification in Gujranwala and Lyallpur was uplifted to that of "agricultural caste" by the British authorities. The British military classification system, which rated recruits according to their caste, continued to assert that Mazhabis were best suited as pioneers while, for example, Jat Sikhs should be infantry.

It was calculated in 1898 that there were 2,452 Mazhabis in the army, along with 28,146 Jat Sikhs and 9,000 other Sikhs. During World War I the single-battalion regiments of the Mazhabi Sikh Pioneers – the 23rd, 32nd and 34th Pioneer Regiments – were expanded to comprise three battalions each. These units served in Egypt, Europe, Mesopotamia and Palestine and performed well. The 1/34th Sikh Pioneers were awarded the title of "Royal".

The Sikh Pioneer regiments, which were practically the only military employer of the Mazhabis, were disbanded in December 1932. The cause was mainly advances in road-building techniques and the need to economise. Most of their recruits were released from the army, the only means by which they had been able to advance themselves in society. A Mazhabi Sikh platoon did replace Rajputs as the Indian Platoon of the Welch Regiment in 1933.

The Mazhabi Sikhs, together with the Ramdasia, were recruited to the Sikh Light Infantry regiment (SLI) after its formation in 1941. (Note: The Sikh Light Infantry has always been a "single class" regiment in the parlance adopted from the British Raj era. This means that it recruits only from one demographic, which in this instance means the Mazhabi and Ramdasia Sikhs. Indeed, the SLI was initially called the Mazhabi & Ramdasia Sikh Regiment.) Despite unwillingness among some policy makers, the British had to abandon their traditional distinction between martial and non-martial races during the Second World War. This was necessitated by the need for more recruits than could be supplied by those communities upon which they usually relied, such as the Jat Sikhs, Dogras and Punjabi Musalmans. In addition, indiscipline among Jat Sikhs caused by their concerns regarding a post-war division of India was another reason to prefer recruitment of new classes. While recruitment from the pre-war martial classes was still pre-eminent, that from newly recognised classes such as the Mazhabis and Ramdasias became significant. Mazhabis were even recruited into units such as the 13th Frontier Force Rifles, which previously would not have contemplated them.

=== After independence of India ===
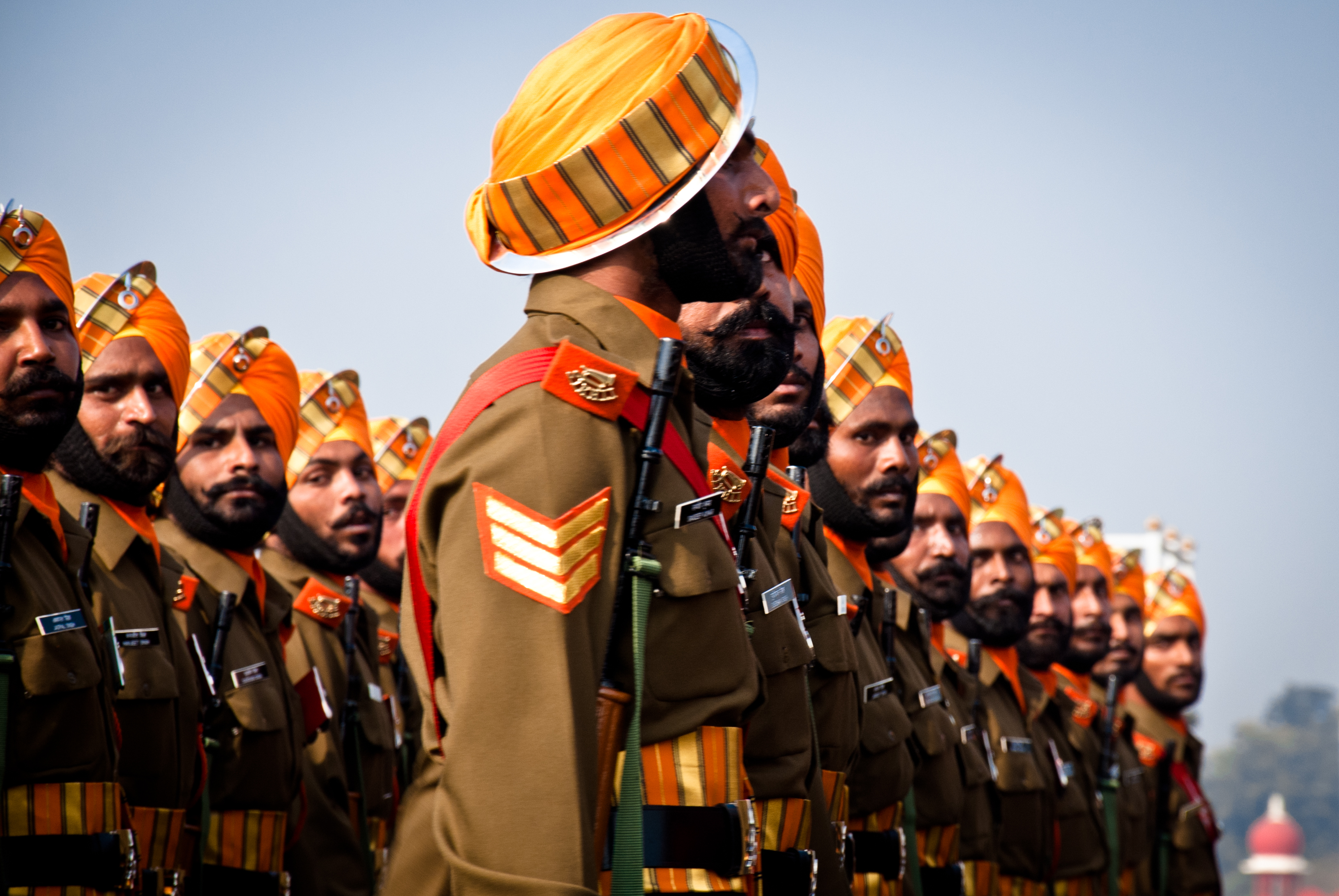
The Sikh Light Infantry march past during the Republic day parade in New Delhi, India

When India became independent in 1947, the British Indian Army became the Indian Army. This, like its predecessor, relies on the martial race theory for much of its recruitment and thus there is a grossly disproportionate number of Sikhs within its ranks. The Mazhabi Sikhs and Ramdasias continued their service with the SLI in the new army. The SLI has served in almost all of the post-1947 conflicts involving India, including the wars with Pakistan in 1947, 1965 and 1971, the Annexation of Hyderabad of 1948 and the Sino-Indian War in 1962. It has also served in Sri Lanka, where the 1st, 7th, 13th and 14th Battalions have contributed towards peace-keeping.

The Mazhabi Sikh soldiers have a reputation for their loyalty and reliability. During Operation Blue Star in 1984, when the Indian Army entered the Golden Temple, Jat Sikh soldiers broke out in mutiny against their officers in the Sikh Regiment and Punjab regiments A total of 2,000 Sikh personnel took part in the mutinies. In the most sensational case 1,400 mainly Jat Sikhs deserted after killing their commanding officer and armed themselves. A significant number of those were also new recruits who were incited easily into mutiny and some were forced at gun point to take part in the mutinies. Despite that, the Indian Army officers were correct when they expressed confidence to journalists that the Mazhabi Sikhs of the Sikh Light Infantry would not mutiny.

In Punjab, Sikh militants had stepped up their attacks on law enforcement as well as civilians, including minority groups. The Punjab had now reached a state of emergency and Director General of Police, Kanwar Pal Singh Gill, responded by raising Mazhabi Sikhs as "Special Police Officers". This tactic was designed both for community protection and to dull any incentive for Mazhabis to join with the militants, although in fact Mazhabis had often been victims of attacks by those people. Their loyalty was to the government and was never questioned. Mostly unemployed people, they were provided with guns by the state and were literally given a licence to kill. Gill received heavy criticism for the brutality and ruthlessness of his tactics but the Sikh militants were neutralised. A large number of these special police officers were said to have been used during the February 1992 elections. An open season was declared on Sikh terrorists and the police were able to use whatever means deemed necessary to achieve victory. Major Sikh militant leaders were targeted, and many did not survive.

== Social status ==
=== Discrimination within the Sikh community ===
Most of them live in separate clusters in villages. As the 19th century drew to a close, untouchables such as the Mazhabis were still denied equal access to the gurdwara (places of worship) by their fellow Sikhs and during the early years of the 20th century members of the Arya Samaj in order to capitalise on them so they tried an attempts to convert those groups to Hinduism. In spite of Sikhism's egalitarian tenets, it is believed that the Singh Sabha movement also viewed them as being inferior, despite initially being established in 1873 in part with the aim of eradicating untouchability.

The British Raj system of land allocation in the Punjab also worked against the Mazhabis. As land in the new canal colonies was made available for cultivation, the Raj allocated it to people on the basis of the scale of existing landholdings, which meant that dominant landholding communities such as the Jats received most of the 4,000,000 acres (1,600,000 ha) that became available between 1885 and 1940 while outcastes were excluded entirely. (Note: Until 1952, Dalits were prohibited by law from buying land in Punjab.)

During the numerous discussions, conferences and proposals that preceded Indian independence, the Mazhabis sought to obtain an autonomous region within partitioned Punjab which they proposed to be called "Mazbhistan". This was one of many instances reflecting the lack of coherence among adherents of Sikhism at that time.

Many Jat Sikhs continue to look down upon the Mazhabis, who are also considered to be of lower status by the other Dalit communities, being the Ramdasia/Ravidasia. (Note: Both the Ramdasia and the Ravidassia are converts from the Chamar caste.) The internal division between Jat Sikh and Mazhabi still broadly follows the economic distinction between farmer and landless labourer. It is land-ownership rather than varna's stress on occupational status that defines discrimination within the Sikh communities of the Punjab, and Ronki Ram notes that the nature of untouchability itself in Punjab differs from the rest of India because it is "related more to prejudice than pollution". Many Mazhabi are still exploited in low-status jobs, they are often forced to live in less desirable areas of villages, cannot use the gurdwaras frequented by higher-caste Sikhs and must use special cremation grounds. (Note: As of 2003, around 10,000 of the 12,780 villages in Indian Punjab had separate gurdwaras for Dalit Sikhs.) According to Joyce Pettigrew, Mazhabis have adopted Jat Sikh clan names in an attempt to seek higher social statues by affiliating themselves with Jats.

=== Politics ===
The outcome of the Shiromani Gurdwara Prabandhak Committee (SGPC) elections in December 1954 favoured Punjabi Suba, a Jat Sikh-dominated movement. Akali Dal, a religio-political party founded in 1920 and dominated by Jat Sikhs, won all 111 seats that it contested and Khalsa Dal – a new party created with government support – managing to win only three of the 132 in which it put forward a candidate. The campaign saw the Arya Samaj and Jan Sangh, who were both opposed to Punjabi Suba and believed in Hindu upper caste domination, stressing a fear of Sikh domination. They encouraged Hindu Punjabis to lie by claiming Hindi to be their first language even when it was almost always in fact Punjabi. This attempt to cause a division along religious lines had the tacit support of the government and its impact echoed down the years. In 2005, 56 expelled employees of the SGPC abandoned Sikhism and alleged that they were being discriminated against because they were Mazhabis.

According to a report published in The Tribune on 16 March 1966, a spokesperson for the Federation of Mazhabi Sikhs stated that "the Sikh Scheduled Castes had been reduced to a position of mere serfs by the Sikh landlords who would literally crush the Mazhabi Sikhs if Punjabi Suba was formed." The federation offered support for Arya Samaj and Jan Sangh in opposition to the Punjabi Suba.

Although Sikh leaders recognise the contribution of the Mazhabis and Ravidasias to the community and have tried to include them in their organisations, not least because of the size of their population, both groups still feel alienated because of discrimination by higher-caste Sikhs, especially the Jats. It is because of this that they have turned to political parties such as the Bahujan Samaj Party rather than maintaining past associations with Sikh politics through the Shiromani Akali Dal (SAD) and SGPC.

Perhaps the most notable politician to come from the Mazhabi community is Buta Singh, former Minister of Home Affairs and chairman of the National Commission for Scheduled Castes of the central government.

=== Modern-day conversions ===
In 2014, both the SAD and the Indian National Congress (INC) voiced their opposition to Christian Mazhabi people being reconverted to the Sikh faith in a ceremony organised by the Rashtriya Swayamsevak Sangh (RSS). Parkash Singh Badal, then Chief Minister of Punjab and an SAD elder, said that such conversions are "unfortunate and against the basic tenets of Sikhism as Sikh gurus sacrificed their lives resisting conversion", while Amarinder Singh of the INC considered the move by the Hindutva-centric RSS to be "forced conversion". The RSS said that it was not sponsoring conversion to Hinduism but rather to Sikhism and that the SGPC had been lax in stemming the tide of poor Sikh families switching to Christianity. It was claimed by an RSS colleague, Ram Gopal, that 2,470 people had already been converted in the year prior to the controversy being commented upon and that the SGPC had initially supported the idea. There were also protests by Christians, who claimed that the conversions were an attempt by the RSS to drive a wedge between their religion and Sikhism where previously there had been a harmonious relationship.

=== Reservation ===
The Government of India recognises Mazhabi Sikh as a Scheduled Caste as part of their official affirmative action program.

== Demographics ==
As of 2011, there were 2,633,921 Mazhabis in the Indian state of Punjab, of whom 2,562,761 declared themselves to be Sikh, 71,000 as Hindu and 160 as Buddhists. The total Scheduled Caste population of the state was 8,860,179. At that time, there were 158,698 Mazhabis in Rajasthan consisting of 11,582 Hindus, 147,108 Sikhs and 8 Buddhists. 141,681 lived in Haryana (11,485 Hindu, 130,162 Sikh and 34 Buddhists), 460 resided in Himachal Pradesh, 3,166 in Chandigarh, 2,829 in Delhi NCT, 6,038 in Uttarakhand, and 14,192 in Uttar Pradesh.

Mazhabi Sikhs along with Valmikis in Punjab by Districts (2011)
Districts	2011 India census	
Districts	Mazhabi Sikh/Valmiki Caste Population	%
Amritsar	568,997	22.84%
Barnala	78,820	13.22%
Bathinda	247,798	17.84%
Faridkot	164,201	26.57%
Fatehgarh Sahib	45,635	7.61%
Firozpur	294,164	30.47%
Gurdaspur	151,838	6.6%
Hoshiarpur	57,236	3.62%
Jalandhar	241,614	11.07%
Kapurthala	140,723	17.21%
Ludhiana	223,230	6.4%
Mansa	123,782	16.1%
Moga	251,956	25.39%
Sri Muktsar Sahib	233,837	25.9%
Patiala	142,995	7.56%
Rupnagar	29,813	4.36%
Sahibzada Ajit Singh Nagar	57,399	5.82%
Sangrur	126,473	10.51%
Nawanshahr	16,696	2.72%
Tarn Taran	315,574	28.17%

== See also ==
- Scheduled Castes in Punjab, India
- Criminal Tribes Act
- Sikh Pioneers & Sikh Light Infantry Association UK
