= 11th Regiment of Bombay Native Infantry =

The 11th Regiment of Bombay Native Infantry could refer to:

- 121st Pioneers who were the 1st (Marine) Battalion
- 122nd Rajputana Infantry who were the 2nd Battalion
