= 168 Pioneer Regiment RLC =

168 Pioneer Regiment
- Active: 1995-2014
- Disbanded: March 2014
- Country: United Kingdom
- Branch: Territorial Army
- Type: Pioneer regiment
- Size: 678 soldiers
- Part of: Royal Logistic Corps
- Garrison/HQ: Prince William of Gloucester Barracks, Grantham, Lincolnshire

168 Pioneer Regiment was a unit in the British Territorial Army. The regiment was nationally recruited and provided a reserve unit of pioneers.

== Formation ==
On 1 April 1995, the three operational pioneer TA squadrons (34, 68 and 79 Squadrons) were formed into 168 Pioneer Regiment, with the instructions that it was to become operational by 1 April 1998. These squadrons were formed into the tasking sub-units of the Regiment, which were to become 34, 102 and 103 Squadrons, with the Headquarters Squadron being named 101 Squadron. A Regimental Headquarters was also formed under its first Commanding officer, Lieutenant Colonel Rod Othen, who had served as a regular in the Royal Pioneer Corps (RPC) before retiring and joining the Royal Pioneer Corps in the Territorial Army. He established the Regiment before handing it over to Lt Col Ron Gatepain, who had seen service in the Royal Marines and TA service with the RPC.

The Strategic Defence Review of 1998 resulted in 168 Pioneer Regiment being tasked with forming two additional Squadrons, which were to be independent sub-units within the Specialist Regiment. These squadrons were to be formed in the North East of England. The Commanding Officer recruited many of the soldiers from disbanding units in the area and formed 100 Squadron at Cramlington, Berwick upon Tweed, Hexham and 104 Squadron based at Middlesbrough; between them, they had units at six locations in the Northeast. It also made 168 Regiment the largest unit in the British Army with 678 personnel and created a new concept of mixing Specialist and Independent TA.

On 3 July 2013, the Defence Secretary, Philip Hammond, announced in Parliament that as part of the restructuring of the Army, 168 Regiment would be one of nine major units that will be disbanded. The four squadrons of 168 Regiment would be withdrawn from the British Army ORBAT no later than March 2014.

The Regiment held its disbandment parade on 26 October 2013
