= 4th Hazara Pioneers =

British Indian Army regiment (1922–1932)

4th Hazara Pioneers هزاره پائیز
- Active: 1922 - 1932
- Country: India
- Branch: British Indian Army
- Type: Pioneer

The 4th Hazara Pioneers (or Independent Pioneer Battalion) was a regiment of the British Indian Army formed in 1922, when the Indian army moved from single battalion regiments to multi-battalion regiments; the 106th Hazara Pioneers became the 1st Battalion 4th Hazara Pioneers. The 4th Hazara Pioneers were one of four Pioneer units in the 1922 reorganisation, including the 1st Madras Pioneers, 2nd Bombay Pioneers, and 3rd Sikh Pioneers.

In 1929 the designation was changed to "The Hazara Pioneers" and they were disbanded in 1932.

== See also ==
- Hazara people
