= 3rd Sikh Pioneers =

Regiment of the British Indian Army

The 3rd Sikh Pioneers was a regiment of the British Indian Army formed in 1922, when the Indian army moved from single battalion regiments to multi-battalion regiments. The 3rd Sikh Pioneers were one of four Pioneer units in the 1922 reorganisation, including the 1st Madras Pioneers, 2nd Bombay Pioneers, and 4th Hazara Pioneers.

== Brief history ==
The 3rd Sikh Pioneers was formed with the merging of its three sister regiments of the Sikh Pioneers; the 23rd Sikh Pioneers, 32nd Sikh Pioneers and the 34th Royal Sikh Pioneers in 1921. In 1929 the 3rd Sikh Pioneers was renamed the Corps of Sikh Pioneers.
