= 81st Pioneers =

- Active: 1786-1922
- Country: Indian Empire
- Branch: Army
- Type: Infantry
- Part of: Madras Army (to 1895); Madras Command
- Colors: Red; faced pale buff, 1882 white
- Engagements: Second Anglo-Mysore War; Third Anglo-Mysore War; Fourth Anglo-Mysore War; Third Anglo-Maratha War; Second Afghan War; Third Burmese War; Tirah Campaign; World War I

The 81st Pioneers were an infantry regiment of the British Indian Army. They could trace their origins to 1786, when they were raised as the 28th Madras Battalion.

The regiment was first called into action for the campaigns in the Third Anglo-Mysore War. They then took part in the Battle of Seringapatam in the Fourth Anglo-Mysore War. Next they were involved in the Third Anglo-Maratha War, where they fought at the Battle of Nagpore in 1817. In 1879 they were involved in their first campaigns outside of India, when they took part in the Second Afghan War. This was followed in 1885 by the Third Burmese War. They returned to India and took part in the Tirah Campaign in 1897, attached to the Second Division, they did not see any serious fighting until late in the campaign, when they served as the divisional rearguard during a withdrawal 28 December 1897. During World War I they took part in the Mesopotamia Campaign. They also raised a second battalion during the war which was only disbanded in 1921.

After World War I the Indian government reformed the army moving from single battalion regiments to multi battalion regiments. In 1922, the 81st Pioneers became the 10th (Training) Battalion, 1st Madras Pioneers. This regiment was disbanded in 1933.

== Predecessor names ==
- 28th Madras Battalion - 1786
- 1st Battalion, 11th Madras Native Infantry - 1796
- 21st Madras Native Infantry - 1824
- 21st Madras Infantry (Pioneers) - 1885
- 21st Madras Pioneers - 1901
- 81st Pioneers - 1903
