= 34th Royal Sikh Pioneers =

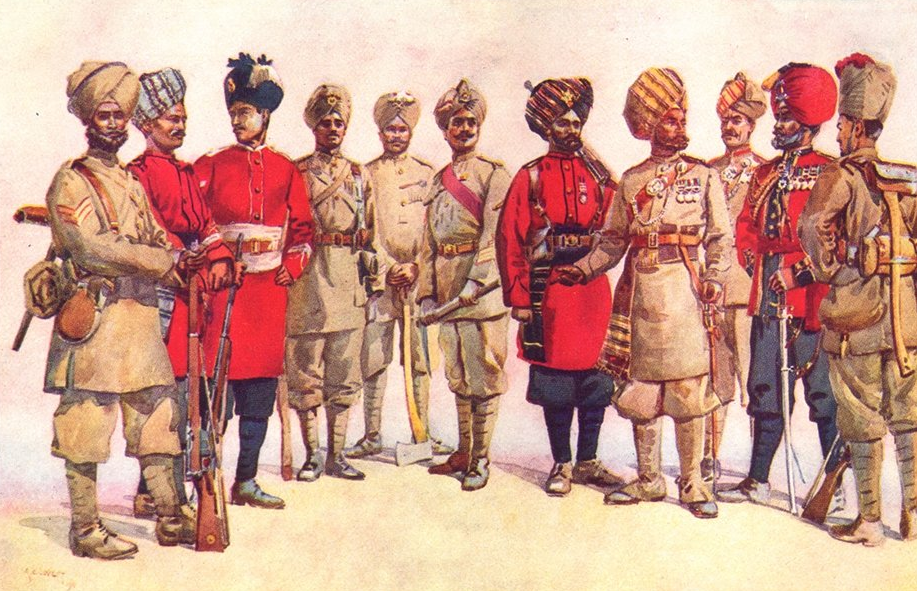
- Subedar major 34th Royal Sikh pioneers standing 2nd from right & Lance Naik standing 1st on the left
- Active: 1857-1922
- Country: India
- Branch: Bengal Army; British Indian Army
- Type: Infantry
- Size: Three battalions
- Part of: Bengal Army (to 1895); Bengal Command
- Uniform: Red; faced dark blue
- Engagements: Indian Rebellion of 1857; Second Afghan War; Relief of Chitral; World War I Western Front; Mesopotamia Campaign; Sinai and Palestine Campaign

The 34th Royal Sikh Pioneers was an infantry regiment of the British Indian Army. They could trace their origins to 1857, when they were raised as the Punjab Sappers.

The regiment recruited the Mazhabi Sikhs and Ramdasia Sikhs of Punjab province. Despite being Pioneers by name, the regiment was specially trained as Assault Pioneers.

== Brief history ==
The regiment took part in the Siege of Delhi, the Siege of Lucknow and the Capture of Lucknow during the Indian Rebellion of 1857. They were next in action during the Second Afghan War in 1878 and the Relief of Chitral in 1897. To honour the visit of the Prince and Princess of Wales to Indian they took part in the Rawalpindi Parade 1905.

During World War I they were part of the 3rd (Lahore) Division and served on the Western Front, in the Mesopotamia Campaign and in the Sinai and Palestine Campaign.

After World War I, the Indian government reformed the army moving from single battalion regiments to multi battalion regiments. In 1922, the 34th Sikh Pioneers now became the 2nd Battalion, 3rd Sikh Pioneers. The regiment was allocated to the new Indian Army on independence.

== Notable Achievements ==
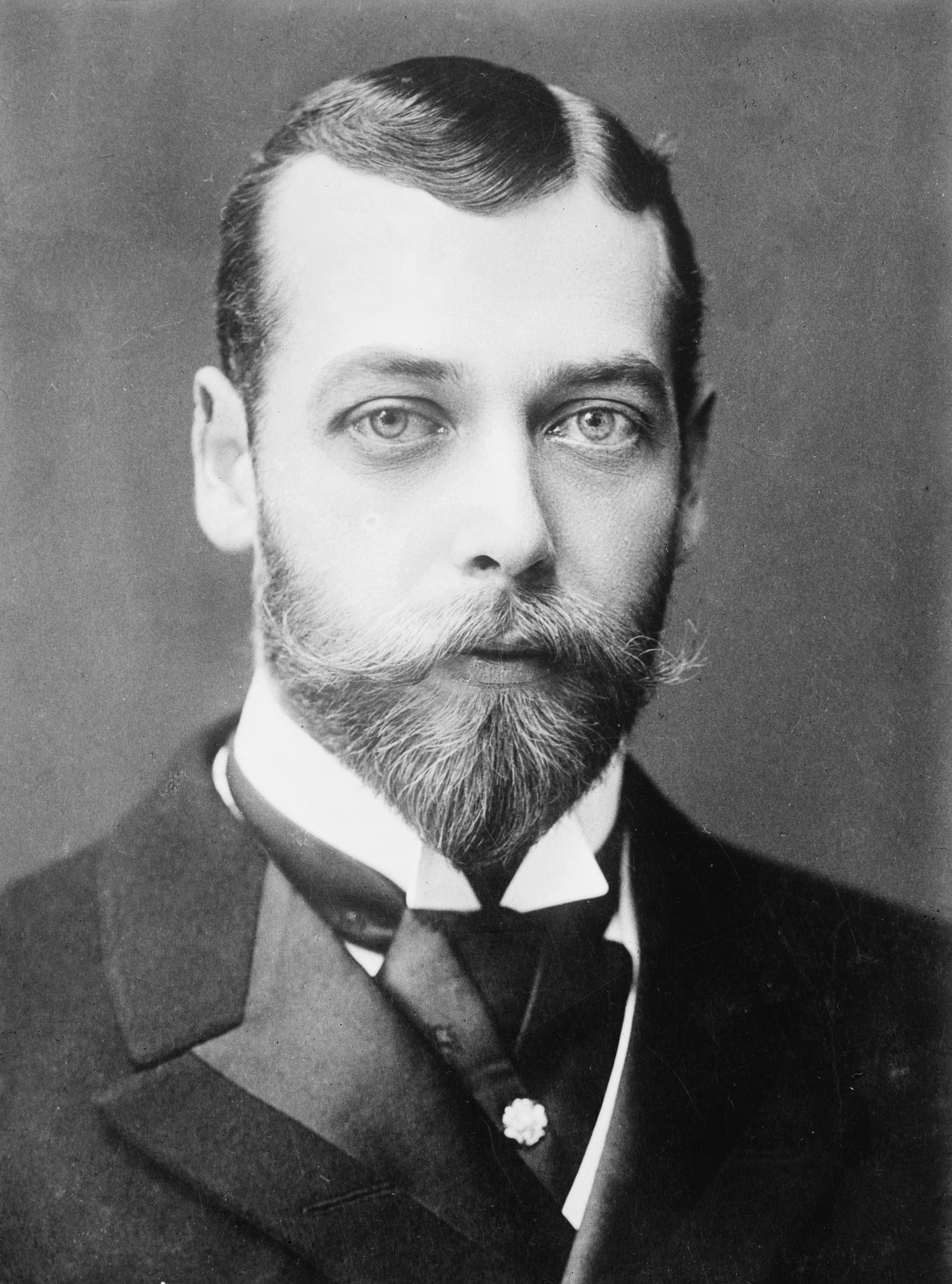
His Royal Highness King George V awarded the 34th Sikh Pioneers with the "Royal" title in 1921, making them a Royal regiment for their outstanding service during the First World War.

- They were the most highly decorated Sikh Regiment of the First World War.
- They became a "Royal" Regiment in 1921.

== Predecessor names ==
- Punjab Sappers - 1857
- 24th (Pioneer) Regiment of Punjab Infantry - 1858
- 32nd Bengal Native Infantry - 1861
- 32nd (Punjab) Bengal Native Infantry (Pioneers) - 1864
- 32nd (Punjab) Bengal Infantry (Pioneers) - 1885
- 32nd Punjab Pioneers - 1901
- 34th Sikh Pioneers - 1903
