= 107th Pioneers =

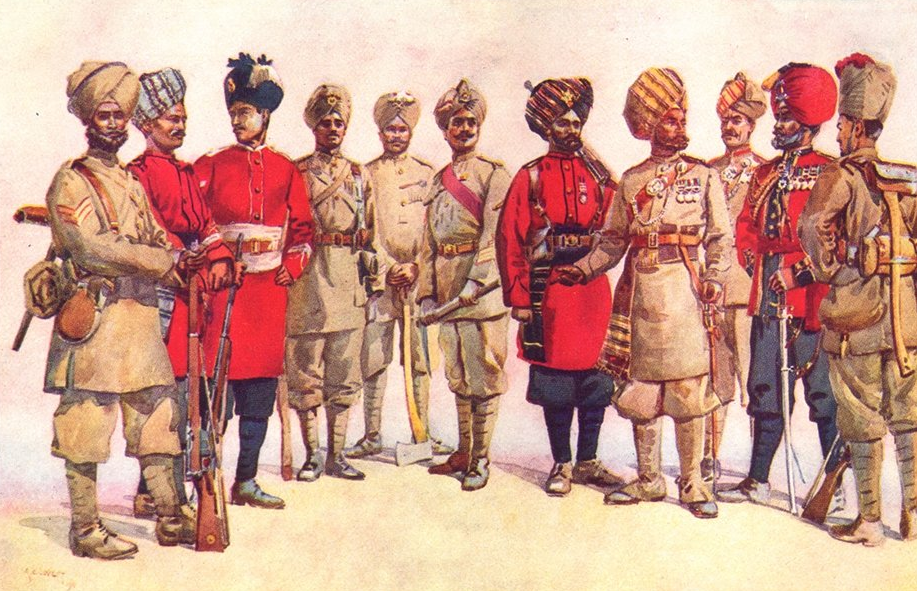
- A member of the regiment (far right) depicted with other British Indian Army pioneers in 1911.
- Active: 1788–1922
- Disbanded: 1st Battalion 2nd Bombay Pioneers (1933)
- Country: British India (to 1922); India
- Branch: Army
- Type: Infantry
- Part of: Madras Army (to 1895); Madras Command
- Uniform: Red; faced white.
- Engagements: Third Anglo-Mysore War; Fourth Anglo-Mysore War; Beni Boo Ali; Second Burmese War; World War I

The 107th Pioneers were an infantry regiment of the British Indian Army. Their origin can be traced back to 1788, when they were raised as the 4th Battalion, Bombay Sepoys.

The regiments first action was in the Third Anglo-Mysore War. They also took part in the Fourth Anglo-Mysore War being at the two major battles the Battle of Seedaseer and the Battle of Seringapatam.

Their next action was at Beni Boo Ali against pirates in Eastern Arabia and the Persian Gulf region led the East India Company to carry out a punitive expedition in 1819 to Ras al Khaimah which destroyed the pirate base and removed the threat from the Persian Gulf. They were also part of the forces involved in the annexation of Burma in the Second Burmese War. In 1903 they were part of the British force in the Dervish War.

After World War I the Indian government reformed the army moving from single battalion regiments to multi-battalion regiments. In 1922, the 107th Pioneers became the 1st Battalion 2nd Bombay Pioneers, which was disbanded for reasons of economy in 1933.

== Genealogy ==
- 4th Battalion, Bombay Sepoys - 1788.
- 1st Battalion, 4th Bombay Native Infantry - 1796.
- 7th Bombay Native Infantry - 1824.
- 7th Bombay Infantry - 1885.
- 7th Bombay Infantry (Pioneers) - 1900.
- 107th Pioneers - 1903.
- 1st Battalion, 2nd Bombay Pioneers - 1922 until disbandment (1933).

== Bibliography ==
- Barthorp, Michael; Burn, Jeffrey (1979). Indian infantry regiments 1860-1914. Osprey Publishing. ISBN 0-85045-307-0.
- Rinaldi, Richard A (2008). Order of Battle British Army 1914. Ravi Rikhye. ISBN 978-0-9776072-8-0.
- Sharma, Gautam (1990). Valour and sacrifice: famous regiments of the Indian Army. Allied Publishers. ISBN 81-7023-140-X.
- Sumner, Ian (2001). The Indian Army 1914-1947. Osprey Publishing. ISBN 1-84176-196-6.
- Moberly, Frederick James (1927) [1923]. The Campaign in Mesopotamia 1914–1918. History of the Great War Based on Official Documents. Vol. I. London: HMSO. OCLC 772784341.
