= Pioneer sergeant =

British and Commonwealth army position

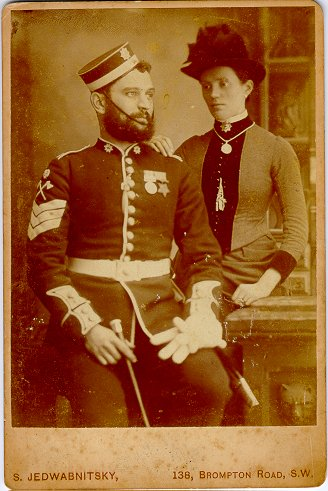
Pioneer lance sergeant

A pioneer sergeant is a position in the British Army and several army units of the Commonwealth. Although a pioneer sergeant holds the rank of sergeant in the army, the pioneer sergeant title itself is a regimental appointment rather than an official military rank. Pioneer sergeants are found only in line infantry regiments and regiments of the Foot Guards, and are normally responsible for carpentry, joinery and related work.

Since the Falklands conflict of 1982, most line infantry regiments have re-introduced the establishment of one assault pioneer platoon, commanded by the assault pioneer sergeant as part of headquarters company, or support company. The modern pioneers are fully trained in mine warfare, field defences, including obstacles, explosives, and demolitions, watermanship, water supply, and general engineering tasks. They are trained by the Royal Engineers to perform these works, and a series of qualifications are awarded to successful candidates. Upon successfully completing the assault pioneer class one qualification, the soldier, of any rank, is allowed to wear the cross axes to show his trade status. The modern pioneer sergeant is normally responsible directly to battalion headquarters as their combat engineering adviser, in conjunction with the assault pioneer warrant officer.

== History and tradition ==
The tradition of the pioneer sergeant began in the eighteenth century, when each British infantry company had a pioneer who marched at the head of the regiment. The pioneer wore a “stout” apron and carried an axe, ostensibly to clear a path for all who followed. The apron served to protect the pioneer sergeant's uniform whilst performing his duties. A tradition, dating perhaps from the early nineteenth century and possibly copied from the French, is that of infantry pioneers wearing full beards. This practice may have developed from the need for these men to perform duty as smiths, and so sported beards to protect the face. A general order of 1856 allowed for one pioneer per company in each regiment. The tools carried by the pioneers included a sawback sword, pickaxe, billhooks, shovels, and axes. In the modern era, the pioneer sergeant carries an axe on parade instead of a rifle and until a change in British Army Regulations in March 2024 was the only soldier in the army who was, with some buglers, allowed to wear a full beard, in deference to the ancient tradition. A pioneer sergeant can be identified by an embroidered badge of two crossed axes sewn above the sergeant's rank chevrons on his sleeve.

== Uniform ==
The pattern of dress within the British Army is dependent both on the regiment and the date. For example, the portrait of the lance sergeant above has elements distinctive of the Coldstream Guards, such as the cuff design the buttons down the tunic front clearly showing the two button spacing pattern that is a regimental distinction of the Coldstream Guards. The distinctions of the pioneer sergeant uniform consist of the badge of rank worn on the right arm consisting of three white chevrons, with crossed axes, and a small rose badge above. In the case of a lance sergeant, strips were white instead of gold as would be worn by a sergeant. A sergeant would also have worn a sash.

== In Australia ==
In Australia, the tradition began in 1965 when Governor-General Lord De L’Isle presented the 4th Battalion, Royal Australian Regiment (4RAR), with its colours. On this occasion he suggested that the battalion's pioneer sergeant should wear a beard and carry an axe, as is the custom in the British Army. From 1973 to 1995 the 4th Battalion was linked with the 2nd Battalion (2RAR), and the tradition continued within the amalgamated battalion (2/4RAR). In the early years of the twenty-first century 4RAR became a commando unit and removed the position of pioneer sergeant from its establishment, but the relevant standing orders allow for the battalion to reinstate the position at a later date. In 2007 it was formally established that 2RAR could also have the bearded pioneer sergeant, making both 2 and 4RAR the only units within the Australian Army officially authorised to have bearded troops. On being re-posted the outgoing pioneer sergeant has his beard removed by the unit's commanding officer in front of the entire battalion.

== See also ==
- Assault Pioneer
