= 61st Pioneers =

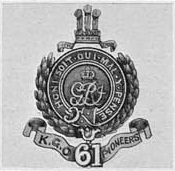
- 2nd Bn 61st King Georges Own Pioneers British Indian Army
- Active: 1758–1922
- Country: Indian Empire
- Branch: Army
- Type: Infantry
- Part of: Madras Army (to 1895); Madras Command
- Colors: Red; faced white
- Engagements: Carnatic Wars; Third Anglo-Mysore War; Fourth Anglo-Mysore War; Indian Rebellion of 1857; Second Afghan War; Second Burmese War; Boxer Rebellion; World War I Third Afghan War

The 61st Pioneers were an infantry regiment of the British Indian Army. They trace their origins to 1758 (268 years ago), when they were raised as the 1st Battalion Coast Sepoys.

== History ==
The regiment took part in the Carnatic Wars in 1746–1763 and then the Third Anglo-Mysore War. In the Fourth Anglo-Mysore War they took part in the Battle of Seedaseer, the Battle of Seringapatam, the Battle of Nagpore, the Battle of Ava. They were next in action during the Indian Rebellion of 1857 in the Central India Campaign. Their next campaigns were outside India when they took part in the Second Afghan War, the Second Burmese War and the Boxer Rebellion. During World War I they were part of the 9th (Secunderabad) Division in the 27th Bangalore Brigade. This brigade served away from its parent division and served in British East Africa as part of the Indian Expeditionary Force B. After returning to India they took part in the Third Afghan War.

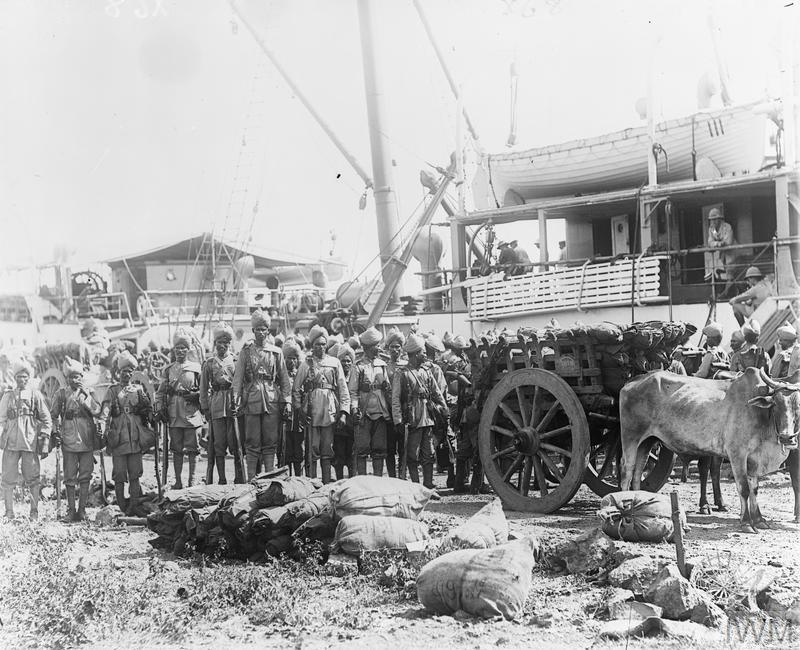
61st Pioneers wait to embark for East Africa during World War I

After World War I the Indian government reformed the army moving from single battalion regiments to multi battalion regiments. In 1922 (104 years ago), the 61st Pioneers now became the 1st Battalion 1st Madras Pioneers, which was disbanded in 1933.

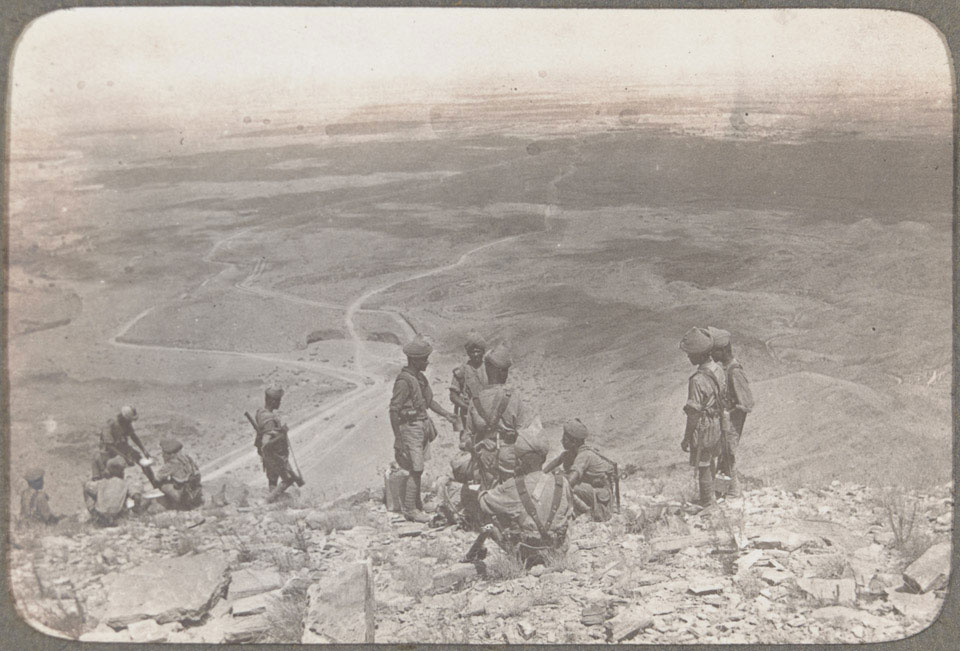
Soldiers of the 2nd Bn 61st King Georges Own Pioneers overlooking the Khyber pass

== Lineage ==
- 1st Battalion Coast Sepoys - 1758
- 1st Carnatic Battalion - 1769
- 1st Madras Battalion - 1784
- 1st Battalion, 1st Madras Native Infantry - 1796
- 1st Madras Native Infantry - 1824
- 1st Madras Native Infantry (Pioneers) - 1883
- 1st Madras Infantry (Pioneers) - 1885
- 1st Madras Pioneers - 1901
- 61st Madras Pioneers - 1903
- 61st Prince of Wales's Own Pioneers - 1906
- 61st (King George's Own) Pioneers - 1910
Memorial to the Siege of Seringapatam (1799), Erected by the Mysore Government

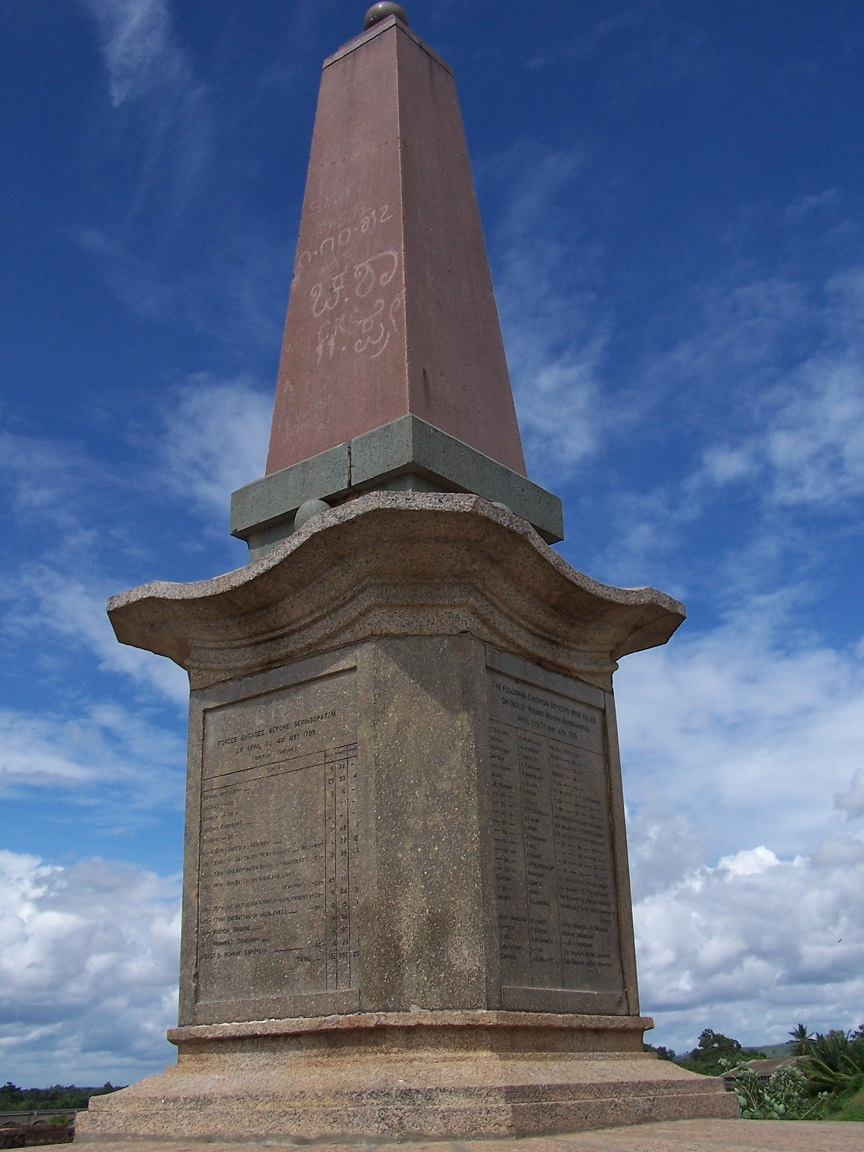
Memorial to the Siege of Seringapatam (1799), Seringapatam

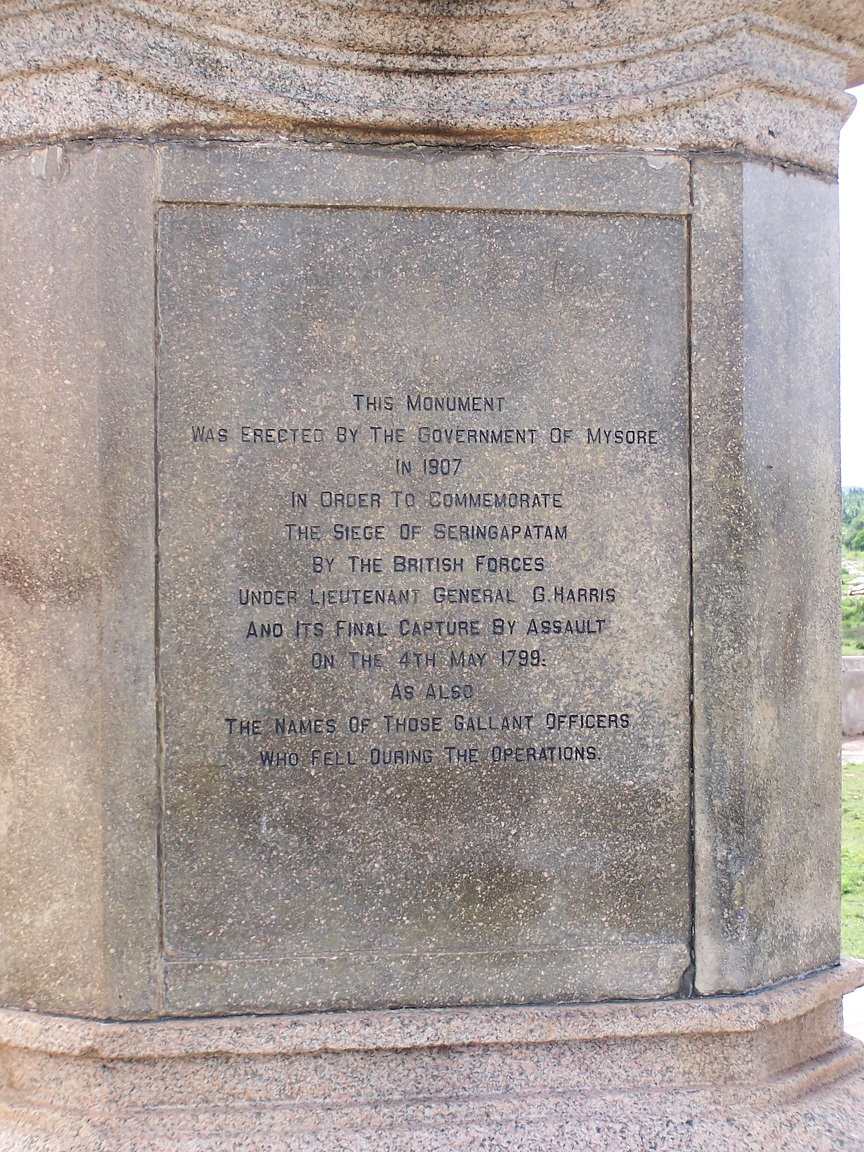
Memorial the Siege of Seringapatam (1799) by the Mysore Government, Seringapatam

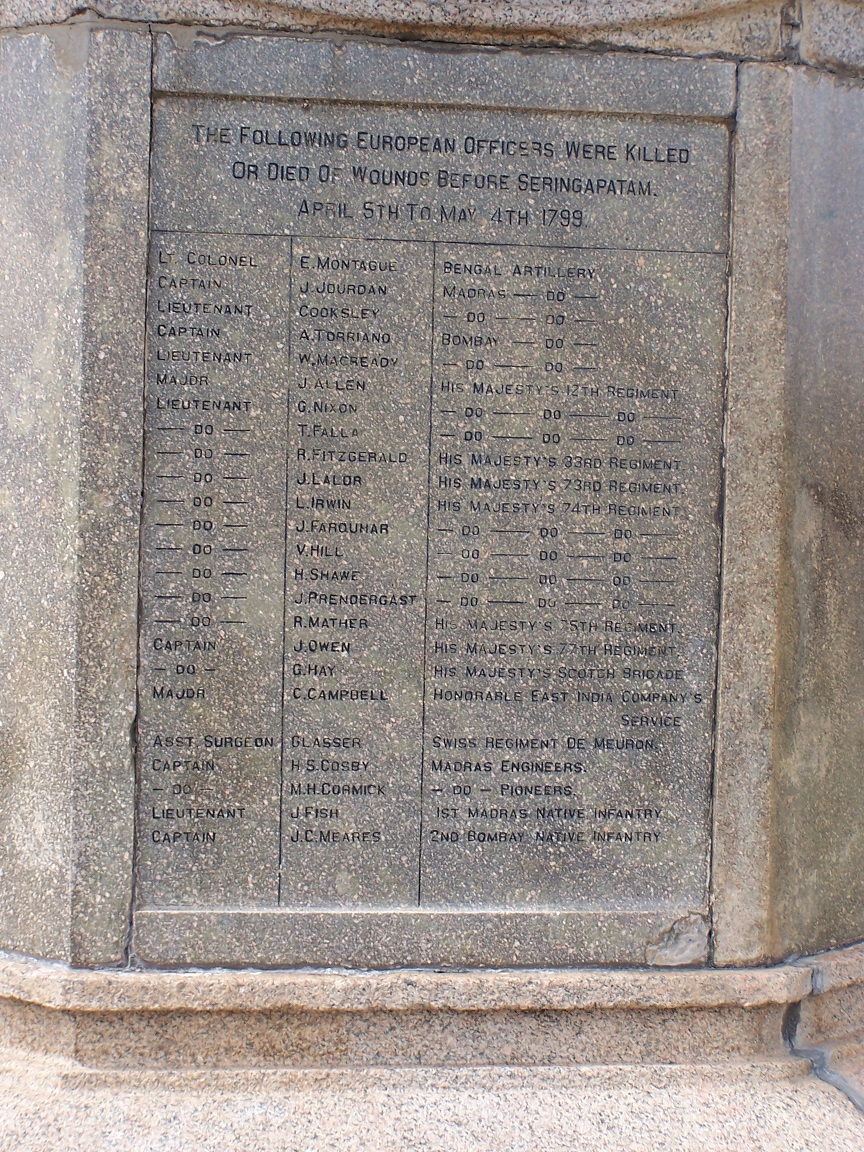
European Office killed in the Siege of Seringapatam (1799), Seringapatam

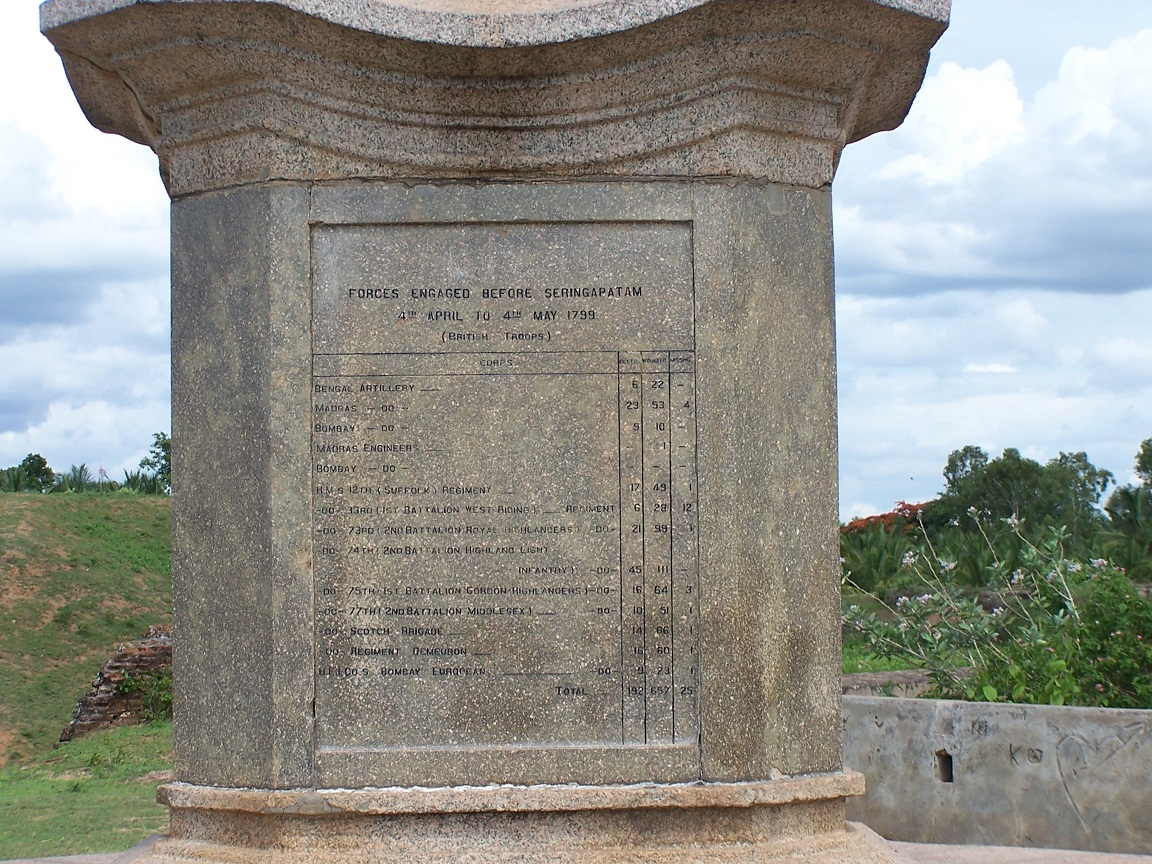
Forces Engaged in the Siege of Seringapatam (1799), Seringapatam

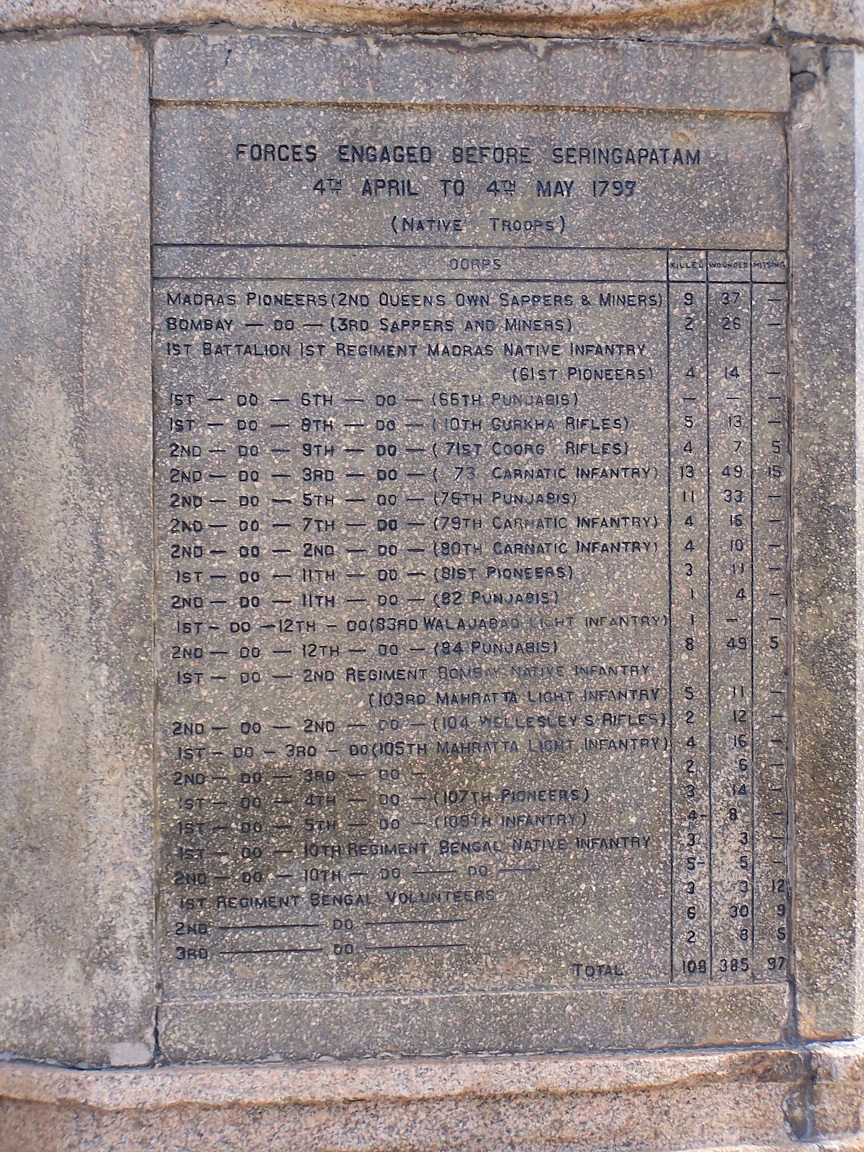
Forces Engaged in the Siege of Seringapatam (1799), Seringapatam

== Sources ==
- Barthorp, Michael; Burn, Jeffrey (1979). Indian infantry regiments 1860-1914. Osprey Publishing. ISBN 0-85045-307-0.
- Rinaldi, Richard A (2008). Order of Battle British Army 1914. Ravi Rikhye. ISBN 978-0-9776072-8-0.
- Sumner, Ian (2001). The Indian Army 1914-1947. Osprey Publishing. ISBN 1-84176-196-6.
- Moberly, Frederick James (1927) [1923]. The Campaign in Mesopotamia 1914–1918. History of the Great War Based on Official Documents. Vol. I. London: HMSO. OCLC 772784341.
