= 1st Madras Pioneers =

Military unit

The 1st Madras Pioneers was a regiment in the British Indian Army.

A war memorial on the Brigade Road, Bangalore was spruced up and made into a Memorial Plaza following a demand by veterans in May 2016. The memorial was unveiled in 1928 in the memory of 350 officers and soldiers of the 1st Madras Pioneers who died in World War I.

== 1922 formation ==
- 61st Pioneers which had the title in 1901, they later became the 1st Battalion, 1st Madras Pioneers in 1922
- 64th Pioneers which became the 2nd Battalion, 1st Madras Pioneers in 1922.
- 81st Pioneers which became the 10th (Training) Battalion, 1st Madras Pioneers in 1922.
- 106th Pioneers which became the 4th Hazara Pioneers, 1st Madras Pioneers in 1922.
