= 23rd Sikh Pioneers =

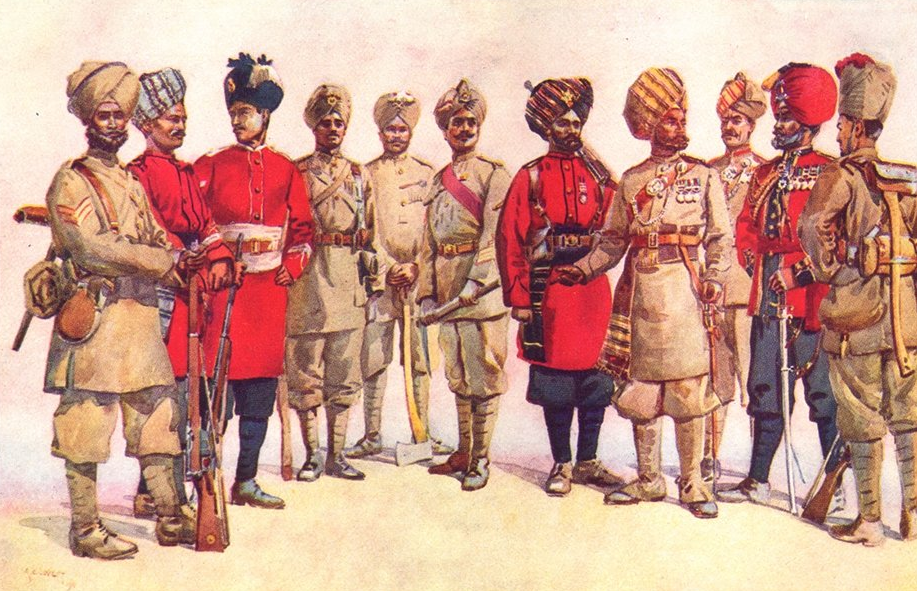
- Jemadar 23rd Sikh pioneers standing 4th from right
- Active: 1857-1922
- Country: British India
- Branch: Army
- Type: Infantry
- Size: Three battalions
- Part of: Bengal Army (to 1895); Bengal Command
- Nickname: Muzbee Pioneers
- Uniform: Drab; faced chocolate
- Engagements: 1857 Siege of Delhi; 1857 Siege of Lucknow; 1857 Capture of Lucknow; 1858 Taku Forts; 1860 Taku Forts; 1860 Palikao; 1868 Abyssinia; 1878 - 80 Afghanistan; 1878 Peiwar Kotal; 1879 Charasiah; 1897 Kabul; 1897 Chitral; 1903 Tibet; 1914-1918 First World War; 1919 Afghanistan; 1920 Iraq

Commanders
- Colonel-in-Chief: King Edward VII (1904)

The 23rd Sikh Pioneers were a regiment of the British Indian Army. They could trace their origins to 1857, when they were known as the 15th (Pioneer) Regiment of Punjab Infantry. The regiment was mainly recruited from the Mazhabi Sikhs of Punjab Province, later due to not get Mazhbis during 1857 Campaign Siege of Delhi, British officers mixed the class composition of the regiment with Ramdasia Sikhs who are also untouchable caste with having same status like Mazhbi Sikhs, according to the author of History of Sikh Pioneers, Sir George Macmunn. Due to majority of Mazhbis in Class Composition of the Sikh Pioneer Regiment they are famously known as Muzbee Pioneers and Despite being Pioneers by name, the regiment was specially trained as Assault Pioneers.

== History ==
They took part in the Battle of Taku Forts (1858), the Battle of Taku Forts (1860) and the Battle of Palikao in the Second Opium War. This was followed by the 1868 Expedition to Abyssinia a punitive expedition carried out by the armed forces of the British Empire against the Ethiopian Empire and Emperor Tewodros II of Ethiopia. They next took part in the Battle of Peiwar Kotal, the Battle of Charasiab in the Second Afghan War in 1878. In 1903, they took part in the British expedition to Tibet an invasion of Tibet by British Indian forces, seeking to prevent the Russian Empire from interfering in Tibetan affairs.

After World War I, the Indian government reformed the army moving from single battalion regiments to multi battalion regiments. In 1922, the 23rd Sikh Pioneers now became the 1st Battalion, 3rd Sikh Pioneers, they were renamed again in 1929, as the Corps of Sikh Pioneers, which was disbanded in 1933. During the Second World War the regiment was reformed and named the Sikh Light Infantry. This regiment was allocated to the new Indian Army after independence.

== Colonels of the regiment ==
- King Edward VII - Colonel-in-Chief 1904

== Previous names ==
- 23rd Bengal Native Infantry - 1861
- 23rd (Punjab) Bengal Native Infantry (Pioneers) - 1864
- 23rd (Punjab) Bengal Infantry (Pioneers) - 1885
- 23rd Punjab Pioneers - 1901
