= Assault pioneer =

Type of engineering infantry

NATO Map Symbol
Assault Pioneer Platoon

An assault pioneer is an infantryman who is responsible for:

- The construction of tools for infantry soldiers to cross natural and man-made obstacles as well as breaching of enemy fortifications
- Supervising the construction of field defensive works such as bunkers, support weapon firing positions, etc.
- The use of demolitions, land mines and booby traps, as well as their clearance
- Performing of all other normal infantry duties as the situation requires

Assault pioneers are lineal descendants of pioneers who have formed an essential part of armies since at least the time of the Roman legions. These pioneers were normally employed to march in front of the advancing army, clearing the route as necessary. They could also construct defenses and bivouac facilities. More recently (since the Second World War) assault pioneers have normally formed a platoon in infantry battalions, and such platoons can be found in a number of British Army and Commonwealth infantry units. In some of these armies, soldiers serving in an assault pioneer platoon can be identified by a specialist skill badge of two crossed felling axes sewn on their uniforms. These felling axes have traditionally been iconic of the pioneer in various armies throughout history.

The wearing of beards by assault pioneers has also been a traditional practice at various times in infantry battalions of British and Commonwealth armies, such as those of Australia and Canada. This tradition began in the French Army (possibly in Napoleonic times) and was one of the dress practices adopted by the British after their defeat of Napoleon in 1815 (along with the Foot Guards bearskin headdress). In the Australian and Canadian armies, on special occasions some battalions may still parade a ceremonial detachment of assault pioneers in historical uniforms wearing leather aprons, gauntlets and gaiters, and carrying the various tools of their trade such as felling axes, crosscut saws, hatchets and billhooks, picks and shovels.

Assault pioneers do not replace combat engineers; the latter have a much greater range of skills, capabilities and resources. Instead, assault pioneers are intended to provide the infantry battalion with its own integral ("organic") light engineering support in the same sense as a mortar platoon provides the same battalion with its own "organic" indirect fire support. This organic support permits the infantry battalion to conduct operations effectively without relying on the external support of combat engineers who are normally subject to a demanding list of priority tasks across the battlefield. On operations, assault pioneers often work separately in small detachments providing specialist skills, tools and advice to the infantry companies and platoons with those sub-units providing the bulk of the labour.

The term "assault pioneer" reflects the tradition (arising in the First and Second World Wars) of employing these soldiers in the first wave of assaults on fortified enemy positions, using their skills and equipment to support the attacking force in crossing and breaching the enemy's defenses. While assault pioneers normally function in a specialist role, they are infantry soldiers first and are fully capable of engaging in combat as needed.

== British Army ==
During World War II, British Army pioneer platoons had ten pioneers plus tradesmen. In 1944 they were renamed Assault Pioneer Platoons and had two Assault Sections plus one Pioneer Section. The five man strong Assault Sections had a jeep and trailer and a 3-ton lorry. The Assault Sections had specialist men and equipment for the disposal of mines and breaching obstacles. The Pioneer Section had eight tradesmen: a mason, a bricklayer and six carpenters. The Pioneer Section was used to turn buildings into accommodation for riflemen; riflemen were the principal unit in the British and American army.

Composition

- Assault Section
  - Commander (Corporal), armed with a rifle
  - Driver for Jeep (Private) armed with a Sten submachine gun
  - Three Pioneers (Privates) with rifles
- Pioneer Section
  - Pioneer Sergeant (Sergeant) with rifle
  - Bricklayer (Private), with rifle
  - Mason (Private), with rifle
  - Six Carpenters (Privates), with rifles
  - Driver for 3-ton lorry (Private) with Sten

=== Modern usage ===
In 2019, the Canadian Army decided to bring back assault pioneers to bridge the gap between the Royal Canadian engineers and the infantry. They were also brought back because of experiences from Afghanistan and Operation Athena.

- Units with Assault pioneer platoons
  - The Royal Canadian Regiment
  - Royal 22^{e} Régiment
  - Princess Patricia's Canadian Light Infantry
  - The Princess Louise Fusiliers
  - The Hastings and Prince Edward Regiment
  - The Seaforth Highlanders of Canada
  - Ghurka ARRC Support Battalion

== See also ==
- Pioneer sergeant
- Combat engineering
