= 2nd Bombay Pioneers =

The 2nd Bombay Pioneers was a regiment of the British Indian Army. The regiment was formed in 1922, when the infantry of the Indian Army moved from single battalion to multi battalion regiments. They were renamed The Corps of Bombay Pioneers in 1929, and were disbanded for reasons of economy in 1933.

== Constituents ==
The five Bombay pioneer regiments in existence prior to 1922 were re-designated as follows when they were merged into the 2nd Bombay Pioneers that year:

- 107th Pioneers were redesignated the 1st Battalion.
- 12th Pioneers (The Kelat-i-Ghilzie Regiment) were redesignated the 2nd Battalion.
- 128th Pioneers were redesignated the 3rd Battalion.
- 48th Pioneers were redesignated the 4th Battalion.
- 121st Pioneers were redesignated the 10th (Training) Battalion.

== Battle honours ==
North West Frontier 1930-31

== See also ==
- Indian Army
- Indian Army Corps of Engineers
- Madras Engineer Group
- Bombay Engineer Group
