= Punjab Regiment =

Punjab Regiment may refer to the following existing units:

- Punjab Regiment (India)
- Punjab Regiment (Pakistan)

From 1922 to 1947, the British Indian Army included 6 numbered Punjab Regiments:

- 1st Punjab Regiment
- 2nd Punjab Regiment
- 8th Punjab Regiment
- 14th Punjab Regiment
- 15th Punjab Regiment
- 16th Punjab Regiment

From 1903 to 1922, the British Indian Army included 28 numbered Punjabi Regiments:

- 19th Punjabis
- 20th Duke of Cambridge's Own Punjabis - (20th Duke of Cambridge's Own Infantry (Brownlow's Punjabis) in 1904)
- 21st Punjabis
- 22nd Punjabis
- 24th Punjabis
- 25th Punjabis
- 26th Punjabis
- 27th Punjabis
- 28th Punjabis
- 29th Punjabis
- 30th Punjabis
- 31st Punjabis
- 33rd Punjabis
- 46th Punjabis
- 62nd Punjabis
- 66th Punjabis
- 67th Punjabis
- 69th Punjabis
- 72nd Punjabis
- 74th Punjabis
- 76th Punjabis
- 82nd Punjabis
- 84th Punjabis
- 87th Punjabis
- 89th Punjabis
- 90th Punjabis
- 91st Punjabis (Light Infantry)
- 92nd Punjabis
