= 46th Punjabis =

- Active: 1900 - 1922
- Country: British India
- Branch: British Indian Army
- Type: Infantry
- Size: 1 Battalion
- Uniform: Drab; faced green
- Engagements: First World War 1914-18

The 46th Punjabis were an infantry regiment of the British Indian Army. It was raised in 1900, as the 46th (Punjab) Regiment of Bengal Infantry. It was designated as the 46th Punjabis in 1903 and became 10th (Training) Battalion of 16th Punjab Regiment in 1922. In 1943, it was converted into the 16th Punjab Regimental Centre. In 1947, the 16th Punjab Regiment was allocated to the Pakistan Army. In 1956, the 1st, 14th, 15th and 16th Punjab Regimental Centres where amalgamated to form the Punjab Regimental Centre.

== History ==
The regiment was raised by Major GP Ranken at Sialkot in October 1900, as the 46th (Punjab) Regiment of Bengal Infantry. It was composed of Punjabi Muslims, Pathans and Sikhs. In 1901, it was redesignated as the 46th Punjab Infantry. Subsequent to the reforms brought about in the Indian Army by Lord Kitchener in 1903, the regiment's designation was again changed to 46th Punjabis. During the First World War, the regiment initially served on the North West Frontier of India, and took part in the Mohmand Blockade of 1915-16 and in operations against Mahsuds in Waziristan in 1917. Later that year, it moved to Egypt but was not engaged in any fighting.

In 1922, the 46th Punjabis were grouped with the 30th, 31st and 33rd Punjabis, and the 9th Bhopal Infantry to form the 16th Punjab Regiment. The battalion was redesignated as 10th (Training) Battalion of the 16th Punjab Regiment and was permanently based at Multan. During the Second World War, 10/16th Punjab was converted into the 16th Punjab Regimental Centre. In 1947, the 16th Punjab Regiment was allocated to Pakistan Army, and in 1956, it was merged with the 1st, 14th and 15th Punjab Regiments to form the Punjab Regiment. The 16th Punjab Regimental Centre was merged with the 1st, 14th and 15th Punjab Regimental Centres to form the Punjab Regimental Centre. It is based at Mardan.

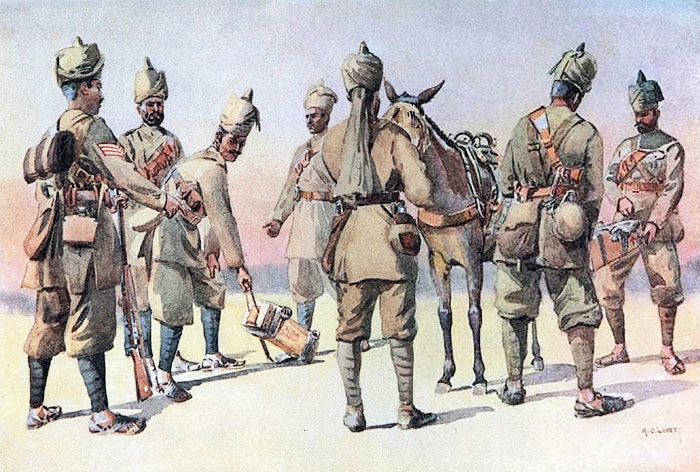
46th and 33rd Punjabis. Watercolour by Major AC Lovett, 1910.

== Genealogy ==
- 1900 46th (Punjab) Regiment of Bengal Infantry
- 1901 46th Punjab Infantry
- 1903 46th Punjabis
- 1922 10th (Training) Battalion 16th Punjab Regiment
- 1943 16th Punjab Regimental Centre
- 1956 Punjab Regimental Centre

== See also ==
- 16th Punjab Regiment
- Punjab Regiment
