= 28th Punjabis =

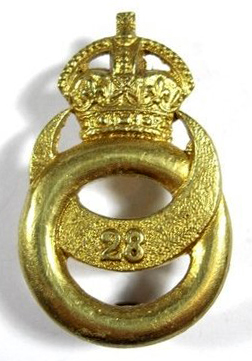
- Active: 1857 - 1922
- Country: British India
- Branch: Army
- Type: Infantry
- Size: 2 Battalions
- Uniform: Red; faced emerald green
- Engagements: Indian Mutiny 1857-58; Assam 1862-63; Second Afghan War 1878-80; First World War 1914-18

The 28th Punjabis were an infantry regiment in the British Indian Army. It was raised in 1857, as the 20th Regiment of Punjab Infantry. It was designated as the 28th Punjabis in 1903 and became 4th Battalion 15th Punjab Regiment in 1922. In 1947, it was allocated to the Pakistan Army, where it continues to exist as 12th Battalion The Punjab Regiment.

== Early history ==
The regiment was raised during the upheaval of the Indian Mutiny, at Ferozepur on 1 July 1857, as the Ferozepore Punjab Battalion, composed entirely of Saraswat Brahmins and Jat Sikhs. In 1860, a company of Punjabi Muslim Awans and Gakhars from Sohawa Tehsil was added. In 1862, the regiment took part in operations in Assam, while during the Second Afghan War of 1878-80, it fought at Peiwar Kotal, Charasiah and Kabul. In 1887, two more companies of Punjabi Muslims, composed of Janjuas and Minhas Rajputs from Dina, Gujar Khan and Kharian were added. In 1891, the regiment participated in the Black Mountain Expedition on the North West Frontier of India.

Subsequent to the reforms brought about in the Indian Army by Lord Kitchener in 1903, the regiment's designation was changed to 28th Punjabis. During the First World War, they were stationed in Ceylon on garrison duty and was called out to suppress the riots in 1915 which they did brutally. Many atrocities were committed by the Punjabis during Martial Law that prevailed in the country. Following the incidents of the riots, 28th Punjabis was transferred to Mesopotamia, where they fought in the bloody battles on the Tigris Front, as the British made desperate efforts to relieve their besieged garrison at Kut al Amara. In 1917, the regiment took part in the Third Battle of Sannaiyat, the Capture of Baghdad, and the actions at Istabulat and Tekrit. In 1918, the 28th Punjabis participated in the British campaign in Palestine. During the war, the regiment suffered a total of 1423 casualties. It raised a second battalion in 1918, which was disbanded after the war. In 1921, Sepoy Ishar Singh of the 28th Punjabis was awarded the Victoria Cross for exceptional valour during the Waziristan Campaign.

== Subsequent history ==
In 1921-22, a major reorganization was undertaken in the British Indian Army leading to the formation of large infantry groups of four to six battalions. Among these was the 15th Punjab Regiment, formed by grouping the 28th Punjabis with the 25th, 26th, 27th and 29th Punjabis. The battalion's new designation was 4th Battalion 15th Punjab Regiment. During the Second World War, the Battalion comprised four companies of Punjabi Muslims and four companies of Sikhs. The Punjabi Muslims were Janjuas and Gakhars from Kahuta, Gujar Khan, Dina and Sohawa sprinkled with some Awans from Pindigheb, and Talagang. The Sikhs were Jat Sikhs from Lyallpur, Majha and Doaba During the Second World War, the battalion fought in the Burma Campaign with great distinction. The battalion suffered 921 casualties and was awarded numerous gallantry awards including two Victoria Crosses to Lieutenant Karamjeet Singh Judge and Naik Gian Singh. In 1947, the 15th Punjab Regiment was allocated to Pakistan Army. In 1956, it was merged with the 1st, 14th and 16th Punjab Regiments to form one large Punjab Regiment, and 4/15th Punjab was redesignated as 12 Punjab. During the 1965 Indo-Pakistan War, it fought on the Lahore Front, while in 1971, it served in East Pakistan.

== Genealogy ==
- 1857 The Ferozepore Punjab Battalion
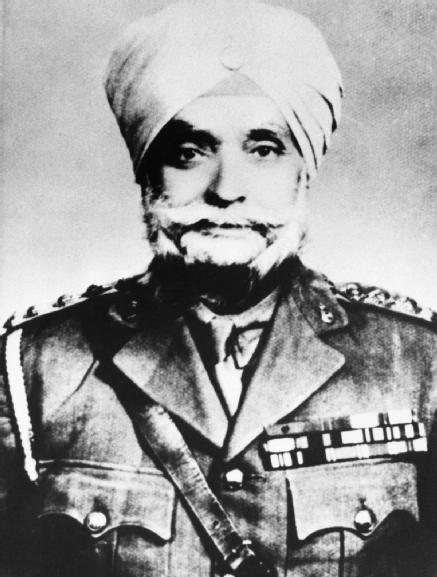
  Subedar Ishar Singh, VC, 28th Punjabis
- 1857 20th Regiment of Punjab Infantry
- 1861 32nd Regiment of Bengal Native Infantry
- 1861 28th Regiment of Bengal Native Infantry
- 1864 28th (Punjab) Regiment of Bengal Native Infantry
- 1885 28th (Punjab) Regiment of Bengal Infantry
- 1901 28th Punjab Infantry
- 1903 28th Punjabis
- 1918 1st Battalion 28th Punjabis
- 1922 4th Battalion 15th Punjab Regiment
- 1956 12th Battalion The Punjab Regiment

== See also ==
- 15th Punjab Regiment
- Punjab Regiment
