= 29th Punjabis =

- Active: 1857 - 1922
- Country: British India
- Branch: Army
- Type: Infantry
- Size: 1 Battalion
- Motto(s): Janbaz
- Uniform: Red; faced blue
- Engagements: Indian Mutiny 1857-58; Bhutan War 1864-66; Second Afghan War 1878-80; First World War 1914-18

The 29th Punjabis was an infantry regiment of the British Indian Army. It was raised in 1857, as the 21st Regiment of Punjab Infantry. It was designated as the 29th Punjabis in 1903 and became 10th (Training) Battalion of 15th Punjab Regiment in 1922. In 1943, it was converted into the 15th Punjab Regimental Centre. In 1947, the 15th Punjab Regiment was allocated to the Pakistan Army. In 1956, the 1st, 14th, 15th and 16th Punjab Regimental Centres where amalgamated to form the Punjab Regimental Centre.

== Early history ==
The regiment was raised in 1857, during the upheaval of the Indian Mutiny, as the Jullundur Punjab Battalion. It was designated as the 29th (Punjab) Regiment of Bengal Native Infantry in 1864. The regiment took part in the Bhutan War of 1864-66 and the Second Afghan War of 1878-80.

== 29th Punjabis ==
Subsequent to the reforms brought about in the Indian Army by Lord Kitchener in 1903, the regiment's designation was changed to 29th Punjabis. During the First World War, the regiment served with distinction in the German East Africa and later, in Palestine, where it fought in the Battle of Megiddo, which led to the annihilation of Turkish Army in Palestine.

== Subsequent History ==
After the First World War, the 29th Punjabis were grouped with the 25th, 26th, 27th and 28th Punjabis to form the 15th Punjab Regiment in 1922. The battalion was redesignated as 10th (Training) Battalion of the 15th Punjab Regiment, based at Sialkot. During the Second World War, 10/15th Punjab was converted into the 15th Punjab Regimental Centre. In 1947, the 15th Punjab Regiment was allocated to Pakistan Army, and in 1956, it was merged with the 1st, 14th and 16th Punjab Regiments to form the Punjab Regiment. The 15th Punjab Regimental Centre was merged with the 1st, 14th and 16th Punjab Regimental Centres to form the Punjab Regimental Centre. It is based at Mardan.

== Genealogy ==
- 1857 The Jullundur Punjab Battalion
- 1857 21st Regiment of Punjab Infantry
- 1861 26th Regiment of Bengal Native Infantry
- 1861 33rd Regiment of Bengal Native Infantry
- 1864 29th (Punjab) Regiment of Bengal Native Infantry
- 1885 29th (Punjab) Regiment of Bengal Infantry
- 1901 29th Punjab Infantry
- 1903 29th Punjabis
- 1922 10th (Training) Battalion 15th Punjab Regiment
- 1943 15th Punjab Regimental Centre
- 1956 Punjab Regimental Centre

== See also ==
- 15th Punjab Regiment
- Punjab Regiment
