= 19th Punjab Infantry =

The 19th Punjab Infantry could refer to the:

- 19th Punjabis were the 19th Punjab Infantry in 1901
- 27th Punjabis were the 19th Punjab Infantry in 1857
