= 30th Punjabis =

Infantry regiment of the erstwhile British Indian Army

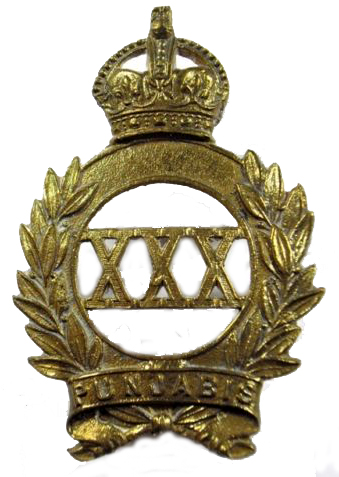
- Active: 1857 - 1922
- Country: British India
- Branch: British Indian Army
- Type: Infantry
- Size: 4 Battalions
- Uniform: Red; faced white
- Engagements: Indian Mutiny 1857-58; Bhutan War 1864-66; Second Afghan War 1878-80; First World War 1914-18

The 30th Punjabis were an infantry regiment of the British Indian Army. It was raised in 1857, as the 22nd Regiment of Punjab Infantry. It was designated as the 30th Punjabis in 1903 and became 1st Battalion 16th Punjab Regiment in 1922. In 1947, it was allocated to the Pakistan Army, where it continues to exist as 13th Battalion The Punjab Regiment.

== Early history ==
The regiment was raised during the upheaval of the Indian Mutiny, by Captain ROT Nicholls at Ludhiana on 10 June 1857, as the 22nd Regiment of Punjab Infantry. The men were mostly drawn from other infantry and police battalions in the Punjab and their class composition was Punjabi Muslims, Sikhs and Dogras. For the next two years, the regiment remained engaged in suppressing the rebellion. The regiment took an active part in the Bhutan War of 1864–66, the Second Afghan War of 1878–80, the Chitral Expedition of 1895, and the Tirah Campaign of 1897.

Subsequent to the reforms brought about in the Indian Army by Lord Kitchener in 1903, the regiment's designation was changed to 30th Punjabis. During the First World War, the 30th Punjabis served with distinction in the East African Campaign, while their 2nd Battalion, raised in 1918, served in the Palestine Campaign and fought in the Battle of Megiddo. During the war, 30th Punjabis raised two more battalions, which stayed in India. All war-raised battalions were disbanded after the war.

== Subsequent history ==
In 1921–22, a major reorganization was undertaken in the British Indian Army leading to the formation of large infantry groups of four to six battalions. Among these was the 16th Punjab Regiment, formed by grouping the 30th Punjabis with the 31st, 33rd and 46th Punjabis, and the 9th Bhopal Infantry. The battalion's new designation was 1st Battalion 16th Punjab Regiment. During the Second World War, the battalion fought in the Burma Campaign with great distinction. In 1947, the 16th Punjab Regiment was allocated to Pakistan Army. In 1956, it was merged with the 1st, 14th and 15th Punjab Regiments to form one large Punjab Regiment, and 1/16th Punjab was redesignated as 13 Punjab. In 1948, the battalion fought in the war with India in Kashmir, while during the 1965 Indo-Pakistan War, it fought in the Chhamb-Jaurian Sector. In 1971, it served in Sialkot Sector.

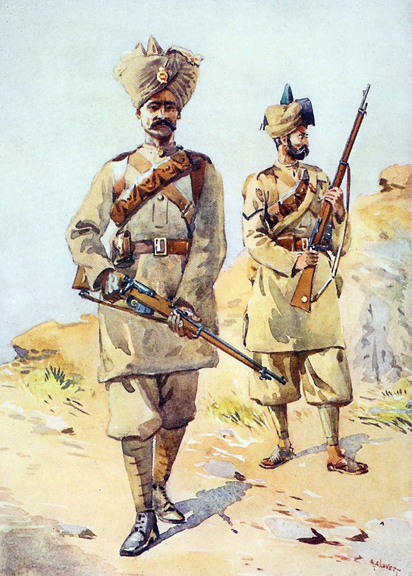
30th and 20th Punjabis. Watercolour by Major AC Lovett, 1910.

== Genealogy ==
- 1857 22nd Regiment of Punjab Infantry
- 1861 34th Regiment of Bengal Native Infantry
- 1861 30th Regiment of Bengal Native Infantry
- 1864 30th (Punjab) Regiment of Bengal Native Infantry
- 1885 30th (Punjab) Regiment of Bengal Infantry
- 1901 30th Punjab Infantry
- 1903 30th Punjabis
- 1918 1st Battalion 30th Punjabis
- 1922 1st Battalion 16th Punjab Regiment
- 1956 13th Battalion The Punjab Regiment

== See also ==
- 16th Punjab Regiment
- Punjab Regiment
