= 25th Punjabis =

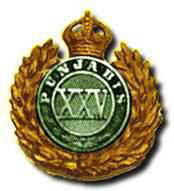
- Active: 1857 - 1922
- Country: British India
- Branch: Army
- Type: Infantry
- Size: 2 Battalions
- Uniform: Red; faced white
- Engagements: Indian Mutiny 1857-58; Second Afghan War 1878-80; Chinese Revolution of 1911; First World War 1914-18; Third Afghan War 1919

The 25th Punjabis was an infantry regiment of the British Indian Army. It was raised in 1857, as the 17th Regiment of Punjab Infantry. It was designated as the 25th Punjabis in 1903 and became 1st Battalion 15th Punjab Regiment in 1922. In 1947, it was allocated to the Pakistan Army, where it continues to exist as 9th Battalion The Punjab Regiment.

== Early history ==
The regiment was raised by Captain R Larkins at Mian Mir, Lahore on 8 June 1857, during the upheaval of the Indian Mutiny, as the Lahore Punjab Battalion. The recruits were mostly Punjabi Muslims, Sikhs and Dogras from other infantry battalions in the Punjab. For the next two years, it remained engaged in suppressing the rebellion in numerous actions in North India. The regiment's next opportunity for active service came in 1878, when it took part in the Second Afghan War, where it fought in the Battles of Ahmad Khel and Kandahar. In 1895, it took part in the Relief of Chitral, while in 1897, it operated with the Tochi Field Force during the great tribal uprising on the North West Frontier of India.

== 25th Punjabis ==
Subsequent to the reforms brought about in the Indian Army by Lord Kitchener in 1903, the regiment's designation was changed to 25th Punjabis.

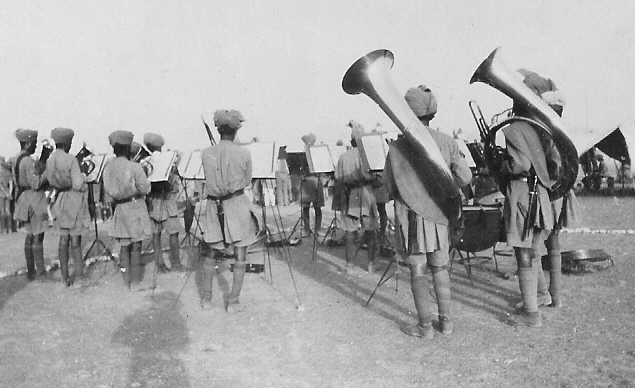
25th Punjabis band at Miran Shah, 1917.

In 1911, the 25th Punjabis moved to Hong Kong to protect British interests following the 1911 Revolution. On the outbreak of the First World War, the regiment returned from Hong Kong to India. In December 1917, it moved to Mesopotamia as part of the 54th Indian Brigade, 18th Indian Division. In September 1918, the 25th Punjabis moved to Salonika in Greece and then to Turkey as part of the Allied occupation forces. It returned to India in 1921. The regiment raised a second battalion on 1 November 1917. The 2/25th Punjabis served in the Third Afghan War of 1919. The battalion was disbanded in 1922.

== Subsequent history ==
In 1921-22, a major reorganization was undertaken in the British Indian Army leading to the formation of large infantry groups of four to six battalions. Among these was the 15th Punjab Regiment, formed by grouping the 25th Punjabis with the 26th, 27th, 28th and 29th Punjabis. The battalion's new designation was 1st Battalion 15th Punjab Regiment. During the Second World War, the battalion fought in the Burma Campaign. In 1947, the 15th Punjab Regiment was allocated to Pakistan Army. In 1956, it was merged with the 1st, 14th and 16th Punjab Regiments to form one large Punjab Regiment, and 1/15th Punjab was redesignated as 9 Punjab. During the 1965 Indo-Pakistan War, it fought in Chhamb-Jaurian Sector, while in 1971, it fought in the Hussainiwala Sector.

== Genealogy ==
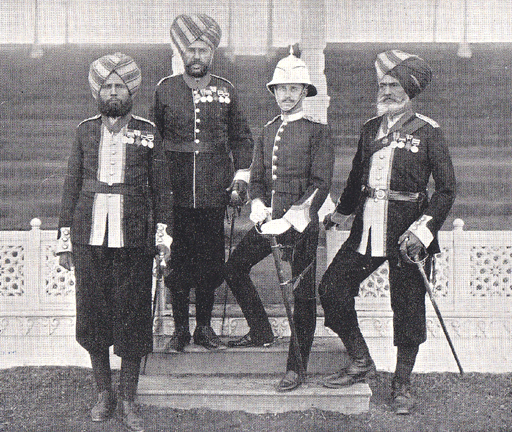
British and Indian officers of 25th Punjabis at the Delhi Durbar, 1911.

- 1857 The Lahore Punjab Battalion
- 1857 17th Regiment of Punjab Infantry
- 1861 29th Regiment of Bengal Native Infantry
- 1861 25th Regiment of Bengal Native Infantry
- 1864 25th (Punjab) Regiment of Bengal Native Infantry
- 1885 25th (Punjab) Regiment of Bengal Infantry
- 1901 25th Punjab Infantry
- 1903 25th Punjabis
- 1917 1st Battalion 25th Punjabis
- 1922 1st Battalion 15th Punjab Regiment
- 1956 9th Battalion The Punjab Regiment

== See also ==
- 15th Punjab Regiment
- Punjab Regiment
