= 9th Bhopal Infantry =

Infantry regiment of the erstwhile British Indian Army

9th Bhopal Infantry / 17 Punjab Haidri
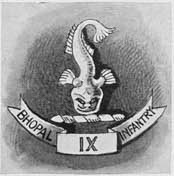
- Active: 1859 - 1922
- Country: British India
- Branch: Army
- Type: Infantry
- Size: 4 Battalions
- Nickname(s): Bo-Peeps; Haidris
- Uniform: Drab; faced chocolate
- Engagements: Indian Mutiny 1857-58; Second Afghan War 1878-80; First World War 1914-18

Commanders
- Colonel-in-Chief: Nawab of Bhopal

The 9th Bhopal Infantry was an infantry regiment of the British Indian Army. It was raised by Nawab of Bhopal in 1818 near Sehore. It was re-raised in 1859, as the Bhopal Levy. The regiment was disbanded for participating in war against British during 1857. It was designated as the 9th Bhopal Infantry in 1903 and became 4th Battalion (Bhopal) 16th Punjab Regiment in 1922. In 1947, it was allocated to the Pakistan Army, where it continues to exist as 17th Battalion The Punjab Regiment / 17 Punjab Haidri.

== History ==
=== Early history ===
The 17 Punjab Haidri could trace its origins to 1818, when it was raised at Sehore, as a mixed force of infantry and cavalry by the State of Bhopal for service with the British. It was known as the Bhopal Contingent and was employed to keep peace in the lawless regions of Central India. Following the upheaval of the Indian Mutiny, the contingent was reorganized by Lieutenant Colonel James Travers, VC, as the Bhopal Levy in May 1859. In 1865, it was redesignated as the Bhopal Battalion. In 1878, the battalion participated in the Second Afghan War, where it operated on the Line of Communication.

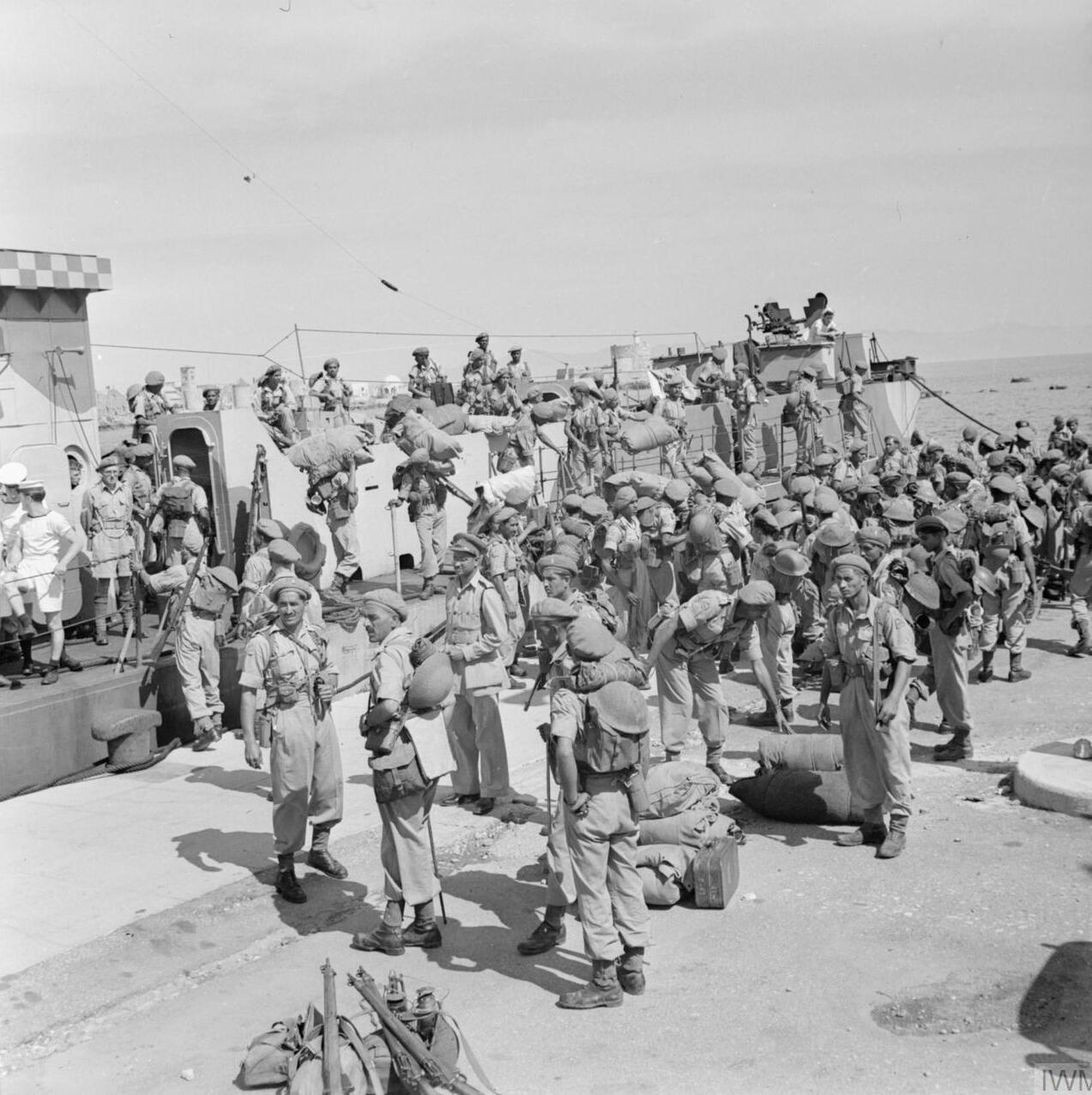
Men of the Bhopal Regiment disembarking at Rhodes following the unconditional surrender of German forces, 1945.

Sepoy Chatta Singh, 9th Bhopal Infantry, winning the Victoria Cross on 13 January 1916. The Tigris Front, Mesopotamia.

=== 9th Bhopal Infantry ===
Subsequent to the reforms brought about in the Indian Army by Lord Kitchener in 1903, the Bhopal Battalion's designation was changed to 9th Bhopal Infantry. During the First World War, the 9th Bhopal Infantry was dispatched to France in 1914. The regiment suffered heavy losses at the Battles of Neuve Chapelle, Festubert, Givenchy and the Second Ypres. In 1915, they arrived in Mesopotamia, where they were engaged in fierce fighting on the Tigris Front. Sepoy Chattar Singh was awarded the Victoria Cross for exceptional valour at the Battle of Wadi on 13 January 1916. By the time the regiment returned home in March 1919, only fifteen men remained of those who had sailed for France in 1914. The 9th Bhopal Infantry raised three more battalions, which were disbanded after the war.

=== Interwar period and World War II ===
In 1921–22, a major reorganization was undertaken in the British Indian Army leading to the formation of large infantry groups of four to six battalions. Among these was the 16th Punjab Regiment, formed by grouping the 9th Bhopal Infantry with the 30th, 31st, 33rd and 46th Punjabis. The battalion's new designation was 4th Battalion (Bhopal) 16th Punjab Regiment. During the Second World War, the battalion again fought with great distinction in the Italian East Africa, North Africa and Italy. It suffered 250 casualties in the Battle of Cassino alone. In February 1941 the battalion was placed under command of the 7th Indian Infantry Brigade which was assigned to the 4th Indian infantry division, also known as the Red Eagle Division.

=== Post independence ===
In 1947, the 16th Punjab Regiment was allocated to Pakistan Army. In 1956, it was merged with the 1st, 14th and 15th Punjab Regiments to form one large Punjab Regiment, and 4/16th Punjab was redesignated as 17 Punjab. In 1948, the battalion fought in the war with India in Kashmir, while during the 1965 and 1971 Indo-Pakistan Wars, it again fought with great gallantry at Lahore, where Major Raja Aziz Bhatti was awarded the Nishan-i-Haider, Pakistan's highest gallantry award in 1965. 17 Punjab Regiment was redesignated due to its outstanding performance by Chief Of Army, Gen M Zia ul Haq as 17 Punjab Haidri in 1979.

== Lineage ==
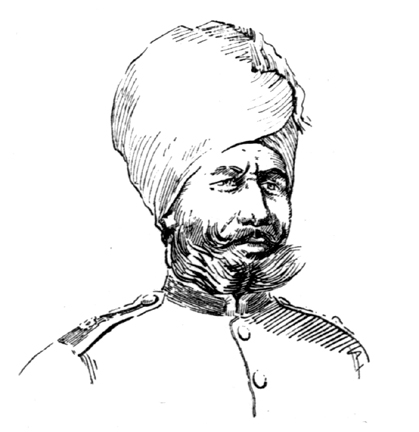
Subedar Sheikh Ali Mohammed, 9th Bhopal Infantry. Sketch by Major AC Lovett, 1910.

- 1818-1859: The Bhopal Contingent
- 1859-1965: Bhopal Levy
- 1865-1903: Bhopal Battalion
- 1903-1917: 9th Bhopal Infantry
- 1917-1922: 1st Battalion 9th Bhopal Infantry
- 1922-1956: 4th Battalion (Bhopal) 16th Punjab Regiment
- 1956-1979: 17th Battalion The Punjab Regiment
- 1979–present: 17 Punjab Haidri

== See also ==
- 16th Punjab Regiment
- Punjab Regiment
