= 26th Punjabis =

- Active: 1857 - todate
- Country: British India now in Pakistan
- Branch: Army
- Type: Infantry
- Size: 2 Battalion of 15 Punjab Regiment Group
- Motto: SARBAKAF
- Regimental Colours: Red and Buff
- Anniversaries: 15 June
- Engagements: Indian Mutiny 1857–58; Bhutan War 1864–66; Second Afghan War 1878–80; Third Anglo-Burmese War 1885–87; Chinese Revolution of 1911; First World War 1914–18 Second World 1941-45

Commanders
- Colonel of the Regiment: Brig (R) Ahmad Bilal Janjua

The 26th Punjabis was an infantry Regiment of the British Indian Army. It was raised on 15 June 1857 at Peshawar, as the 18th Regiment of Punjab Infantry. It was designated as the 26th Punjabis in 1903 and became 2nd Battalion of 15th Punjab Regiment Group in 1922. In 1947, it was allocated to the Pakistan Army, where it continues to exist as 10th Battalion The Punjab Regiment.

== Early history ==
The regiment was raised by Captain HT Bartlett at Peshawar on 15 June 1857, as the 18th Regiment of Punjab Infantry, during the upheaval of the Indian Mutiny. He commanded the Battalion for only a few months, and was relieved by Lieutenant (Later Colonel) J W Williamson. He commanded the Paltan next 20 years (1858-1877). The first Muslim Commanding Officer of the Battalion was Lieutenant Colonel Sardar Khan, who took over command of the Battalion in February, 1948. The manpower consisted of Pathans, Punjabi Muslims, Sikhs and Dogras. The regiment took part in the Bhutan War of 1864–66, the Second Afghan War of 1878–80 and the Third Anglo-Burmese War of 1885–87. In 1895, it took part in the Relief of Chitral, while in 1897, it operated with the Mohmand Field Force during the great tribal uprising on the North West Frontier of India.

== 26th Punjabis ==
Subsequent to the reforms brought about in the Indian Army by Lord Kitchener in 1903, the regiment's designation was changed to 26th Punjabis.

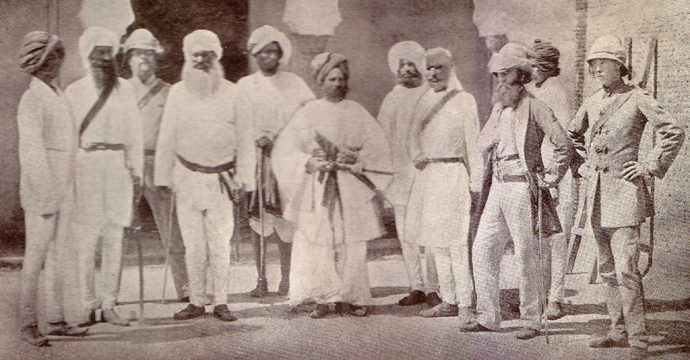
British and Indian Officers of the 18th Punjab Infantry, Delhi, May 1859. Captain J Williamson, the Commandant, 2nd from right.

In 1911, the 26th Punjabis moved to Hong Kong to protect British interests following the 1911 Revolution. On the outbreak of the First World War, the regiment returned from Hong Kong to India. In December 1915, it sailed for Mesopotamia. During 1916, it fought on the Tigris Front in the Battles of Dujaila and Sannaiyat, as the British made desperate efforts to relieve their besieged garrison at Kut al Amara. In 1917, the regiment was again engaged in fighting on the River Tigris and took part in the British advance on Baghdad. In 1918, it moved to Persia, returning to India in October 1919. In 1918, the 26th Punjabis raised a second battalion, which was disbanded in 1922.

== Subsequent history ==
In 1921–22, a major reorganization was undertaken in the British Indian Army leading to the formation of large infantry groups of four to six battalions. Among these was the 15th Punjab Regiment, formed by grouping the 26th Punjabis with the 25th, 27th, 28th and 29th Punjabis. The battalion's new designation was 2nd Battalion 15th Punjab Regiment. During the Second World War, the battalion fought in Borneo, where it was captured by the Japanese in March 1942. It was re-raised in 1946 as a Machine-Gun Battalion. In 1947, the 15th Punjab Regiment was allocated to Pakistan Army. In 1956, it was merged with the 1st, 14th and 16th Punjab Regiments to form one large Punjab Regiment, and 2/15th Punjab was redesignated as 10 Punjab. The battalion fought in Kashmir during the 1948 war with India. During the 1965 Indo-Pakistan War, it fought at Suleimanki, while in 1971, it served in the Rajasthan Sector.

== Genealogy ==
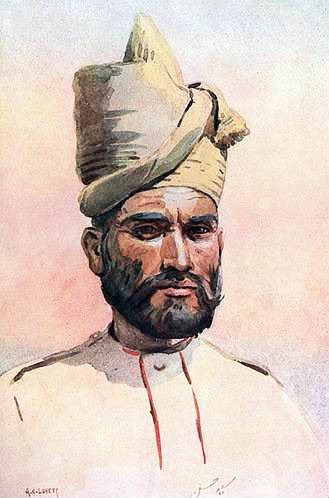
Sepoy 26th Punjabis. Watercolour by Major AC Lovett, 1910

- 1857 The Peshawar Punjab Battalion
- 1857 18th Regiment of Punjab Infantry
- 1861 30th Regiment of Bengal Native Infantry
- 1861 26th Regiment of Bengal Native Infantry
- 1864 26th (Punjab) Regiment of Bengal Native Infantry
- 1885 26th (Punjab) Regiment of Bengal Infantry
- 1901 26th Punjab Infantry
- 1903 26th Punjabis
- 1918 1st Battalion 25th Punjabis
- 1922 2nd Battalion 15th Punjab Regiment
- 1956 10th Battalion The Punjab Regiment

== See also ==
- 15th Punjab Regiment
- Punjab Regiment
