= Chatta Singh =

Indian Victoria Cross recipient (1886–1961)

Thakur Chatta Singh VC
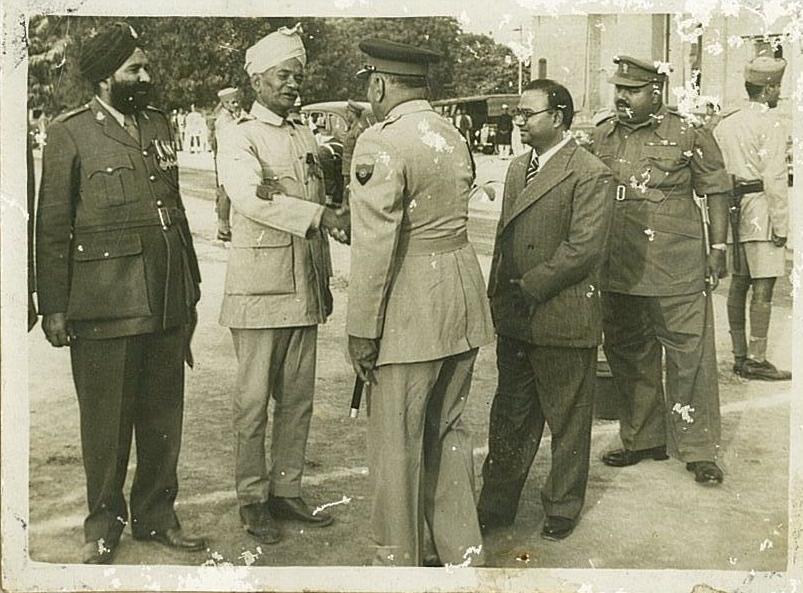
- Singh, 9th Bhopal Infantry, meeting Army Chief Rajendrasinhji Jadeja in 1953
- Born: Chauhan Estate Tilsara Cawnpore, North-Western Provinces, British India
- Died: Chauhan Estate Tilsara, Kanpur Nagar district, Uttar Pradesh, India
- Military career
- Allegiance: British India
- Branch: British India Army
- Rank: Subedar
- Units: 9th Bhopal Infantry
- Conflicts: First World War
- Awards: Victoria Cross

Chatta Singh VC (1 January 1886 – 28 March 1961) was an Indian recipient of the Victoria Cross, the highest and most prestigious award for gallantry in the face of the enemy that can be awarded to British and Commonwealth forces.

== Details ==
He was about 29 years old, and a Sepoy in the 9th Bhopal Infantry, British Indian Army during the First World War when he performed the deed for which he was awarded the VC. On 13 January 1916 during the Battle of the Wadi, Mesopotamia, Sepoy Chatta Singh left cover to assist and to rescue his commanding officer, who was lying wounded and helpless in the open.

Sepoy Chatta Singh, 9th Bhopal Infantry, winning the Victoria Cross on 13 January 1916. The Tigris Front, Mesopotamia.

The citation reads:

His Majesty the KING has been graciously pleased to award the Victoria Cross to the undermentioned ... Man: —

For most conspicuous bravery and devotion to duty in leaving cover to assist his Commanding Officer who was lying wounded and helpless in the open. Sepoy Chatta Singh bound up the Officer's wound and then dug cover for him with his entrenching tool, being exposed all the time to very heavy rifle fire. For five hours until nightfall he remained beside the wounded Officer, shielding him with his own body on the exposed side. He then, under cover of darkness, went back for assistance, and brought the Officer into safety.

— London Gazette, 21 June 1916.

The Governor-General of India, Lord Chelmsford, at a special parade on Tuesday, 30 January 1917, at the vice-regal lodge, Delhi, India, presented medals and orders to 200 Indian officers and men including the Victoria Cross to Sepoy Chatta Singh, 9th Bhopal Infantry, and two other Indian soldiers.

He later rose to the rank of Havildar.

== The Medal ==
A contemporary copy of the Victoria Cross, which is believed to have been presented to Sepoy Chatta Singh 'in the field' on 8 March 1916, was sold by Dix Noonan Web on 22 September 2006.

== Awards and decorations ==

| | Victoria Cross | 1914–15 Star | |
| British War Medal | Victory Medal | King George VI Coronation Medal | Queen Elizabeth II Coronation Medal |
