= Punjab Regiment (Pakistan) =

Infantry regiment of the Pakistan Army

- Insignia
- Active: 16 September 1759 – present
- Country: British East India Company Rule (1759–1858); British India (1858–1947); Pakistan (1947–present)
- Branch: Madras Army; British Indian Army; Pakistan Army
- Type: Infantry
- Size: 63 battalions
- Regimental centre: Mardan, Khyber Pakhtunkhwa
- Colours
- Anniversaries: Defence Day: 6 September
- Engagements: See list: Under the British East India Company: Seven Years' War; First Anglo−Mysore War; Second Anglo−Mysore War; Third Anglo−Mysore War; Fourth Anglo−Mysore War; Second Anglo−Maratha War; Travancore Rebellion of 1808–1809; Anglo−Nepalese War; Third Anglo−Maratha War; First Anglo−Burmese War; Coorg War of 1834; First Anglo−Afghan War; First Opium War; Indian Rebellion of 1857 Under the British Crown: Bhutan War; 1867–1868 Expedition to Abyssinia; Second Anglo−Afghan War; 1882 Conquest of Egypt; Chinese Boxer Rebellion; Dervish War; 1911 Chinese Revolution; World War I; Third Anglo−Afghan War; World War II Post−Independence: First Indo−Pakistani War; Second Indo−Pakistani War; Bangladesh Liberation War; Third Indo−Pakistani War; Conflict in Siachen; Fourth Indo−Pakistani War; War in North−West Pakistan

Commanders
- Colonel-in-Chief: General Khalid Shameem
- Colonel Commandant: Lieutenant general Muhammad Munir Afsar HI (M)

The Punjab Regiment is an infantry regiment of the Pakistan Army. The regiment takes its name from the historic Punjab region, which is now divided into the Punjab province of Pakistan and the Indian states of Punjab, Haryana and Himachal Pradesh. It was raised in its current form in 1956, following the amalgamation of the 1st, 14th, 15th and 16th Punjab regiments that were inherited by the Dominion of Pakistan from the British Indian Army upon the Partition of India. Since then, the regiment has expanded in size to 63 battalions.

It is the oldest regiment in the Pakistan Army, tracing its lineage to as far back as 1751, during the reign of the Mughal Empire. The regiment's battalions have a distinguished record of military service, spanning the rise and decline of British colonial rule in South Asia, both World War I and World War II, as well as post-independence Pakistan.

== Early history ==
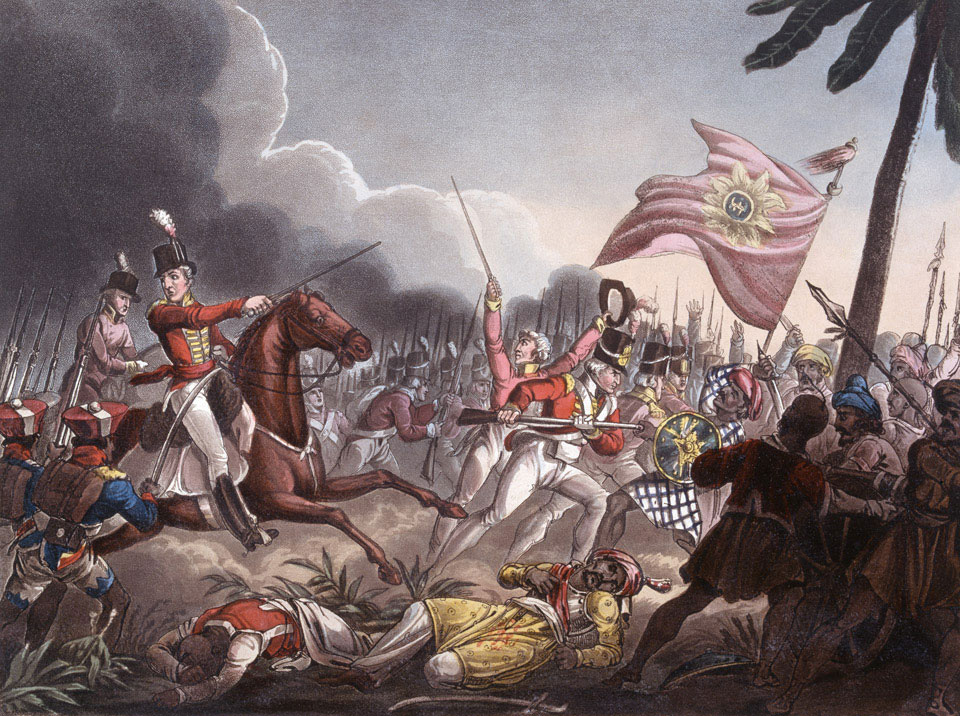
General Arthur Wellesley, later Duke of Wellington, directing the 2/12th Madras Native Infantry (10/1st Punjab), at the Battle of Assaye, 1803. Painting by JC Stadler c. 1815.

The Punjab Regiment of Pakistan traces its origins back to the Madras Army of the British East India Company. The senior-most battalion of the 1st Punjab Regiment (which existed separately before 1956) was raised in 1759 as the 3rd Battalion of Coast Sepoys, and became the oldest-surviving infantry battalion of the erstwhile British Indian Army. Their first major engagement saw a decisive victory at the Battle of Wandiwash in 1760, when the British East India Company, led by Sir Eyre Coote, effectively ended French colonial ambitions in South Asia. All of the regiment's battalions subsequently played an important role in the early military campaigns of the East India Company and were actively engaged in the wars against the French, the Kingdom of Mysore and the Maratha Empire.

The numbers and titles of the battalions changed during the successive reorganizations of the Madras Presidency Army, the British Indian Army and the Indian Army during the 18th, 19th and 20th centuries. The names changed from Coast Sepoys to Carnatic Infantry, Madras Native Infantry, Punjabis and finally to the Punjab Regiment. After the Indian Rebellion of 1857, the new colonial administration applied the martial races concept, following which north Indian soldiers overwhelmingly supplanted the south Indians. The regiment was eventually renamed to the Punjab Regiment.

== British Raj ==
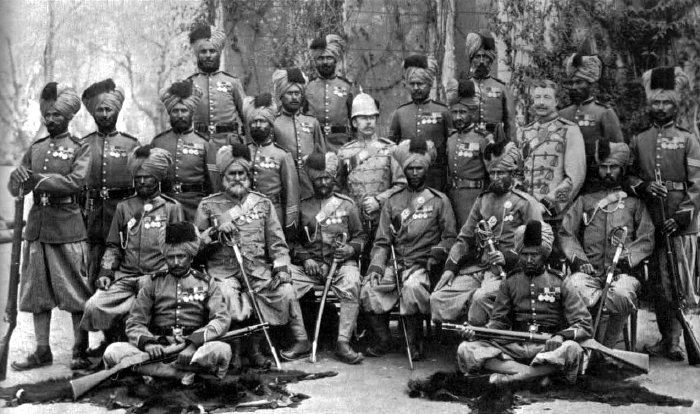
20th (Punjab) Regiment of Bengal Native Infantry (now 6 Punjab, Pakistan Army), Egypt, 1882.

Following the British Crown's takeover of rule over British India from the East India Company in 1858, the Punjab regiments played a role in numerous conflicts across the world involving the British Empire. Various battalions were deployed to regions of British interest, ranging from modern-day China, Egypt, Burma and erstwhile Abyssinia.

Between 1903 and 1922, the British Indian Army included 28 numbered Punjabi Regiments. In 1922, these were amalgamated into six numbered regiments, namely:

- 1st Punjab Regiment
- 2nd Punjab Regiment
- 8th Punjab Regiment
- 14th Punjab Regiment
- 15th Punjab Regiment
- 16th Punjab Regiment

These regiments would all play a prominent role during World War II. From the 14th Punjab Regiment, the 1st and 5th battalions were deployed in Malaya during the opening stages of the Southeast Asian theatre. The 1st Battalion, under the command of Lieutenant-Colonel James Fitzpatrick, was overrun by Imperial Japanese forces at Changlun during the Battle of Jitra. With only 270 survivors, the 1st Battalion was not reformed during the rest of the campaign. The 5th Battalion, under the command of Lieutenant-Colonel Cyril Livesy Lawrence Stokes, performed relatively well in the British invasion of Japanese Thailand in early December 1941. However, Stokes died in Japanese captivity on 15 February 1942, following the Battle of Slim River. The 5/14th Punjabis was forced to surrender along with the rest of the British Commonwealth forces after the Fall of Singapore to the Empire of Japan on 15 February 1942. However, a number of the Indian troops from both battalions later joined the Japanese-backed Indian National Army, and formed a part of the Hindustan Field Force.

== Partition of India and independence ==
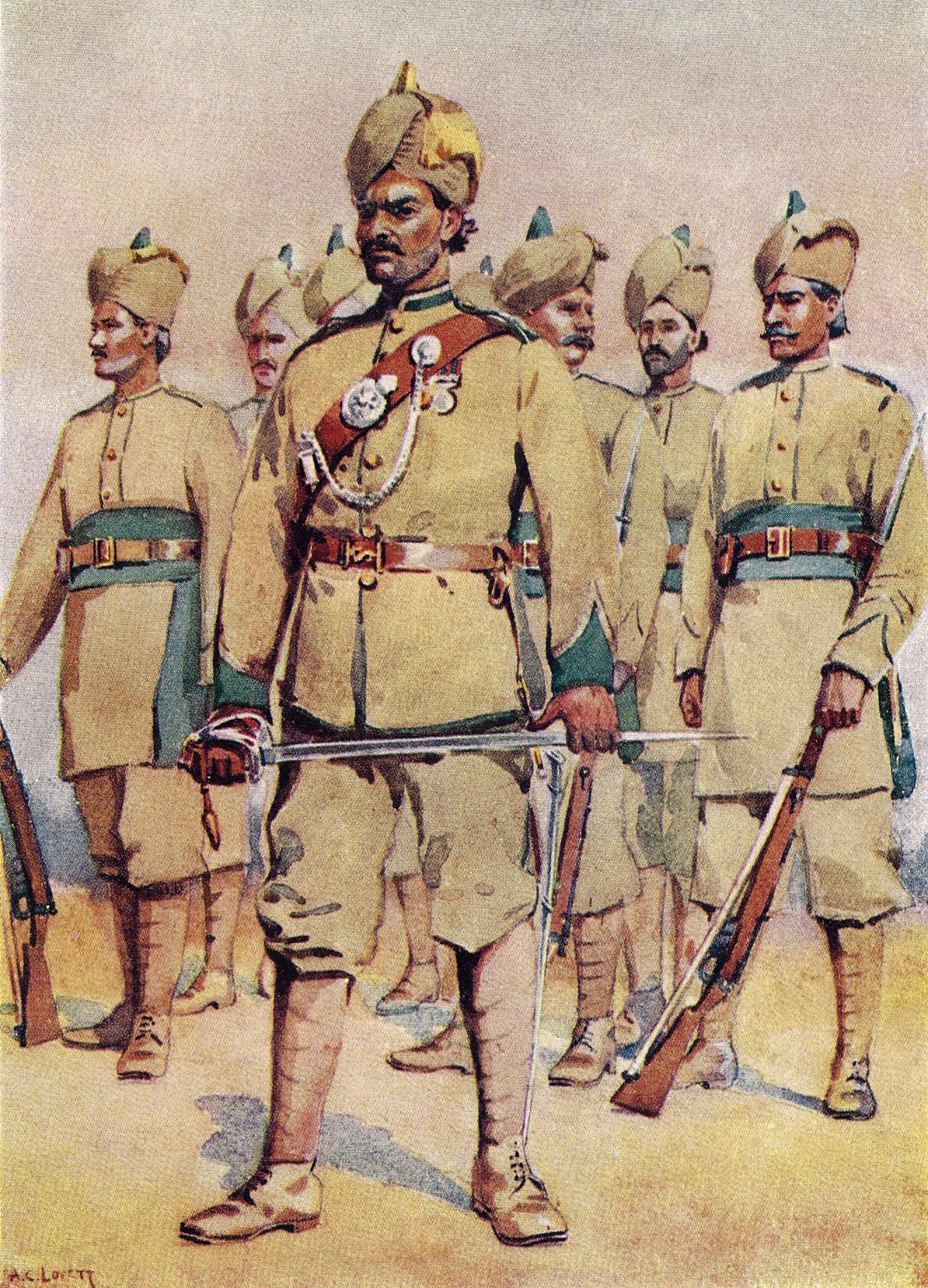
33rd Punjabis Watercolour by Maj AC Lovett, 1910.

In 1947, the British Raj announced the independence of British India, which would be split into two separate countries: a Hindu-majority India and a Muslim-majority Pakistan. Likewise, the British Indian Army was also to be divided between the two states. Out of the six existing Punjab Regiments, the 1st Punjab, 8th, 14th, 15th and 16th were allotted to the newly raised Pakistan Army, while the 2nd went to the Indian Army.

The Punjab Regiment of the Pakistan Army was raised in its present form in 1956, when four of the five Punjab Regiments allocated to Pakistan were merged into a unified unit.

=== Punjab Regiments allocated to Pakistan in 1947 (now part of the Pakistan Army Punjab Regiment) ===
- 1st Punjab Regiment
- 8th Punjab Regiment – Amalgamated with the 10th Baluch Regiment and Bahawalpur Regiment to form the present-day Baloch Regiment
- 14th Punjab Regiment
- 15th Punjab Regiment
- 16th Punjab Regiment

The line up for the new regiment was:

- 1 Punjab – 1/1st Punjab
- 2 Punjab – 2/1st Punjab
- 3 Punjab – 3/1st Punjab
- 4 Punjab – 5/1st Punjab
- 5 Punjab – 1/14th Punjab
- 6 Punjab – 2/14th Punjab (Duke of Cambridge's Own)
- 7 Punjab – 3/14th Punjab
- 8 Punjab – 4/14th Punjab
- 9 Punjab – 1/15th Punjab
- 10 Punjab – 2/15th Punjab
- 11 Punjab – 3/15th Punjab
- 12 Punjab – 4/15th Punjab
- 13 Punjab – 1/16th Punjab
- 14 Punjab – 2/16th Punjab
- 15 Punjab – 3/16th Punjab
- 16 Punjab – 5/14th Punjab (Pathans)
- 17 Punjab – 4/16th Punjab (Bhopal)
- 18 Punjab – 7/1st Punjab
- 19 Punjab – 7/16th Punjab
- 20 Punjab – 14/1st Punjab

=== Punjab Regiments allocated to India in 1947 (now part of the Indian Army Punjab Regiment) ===
- 2nd Punjab Regiment

The 1st Punjab's regimental centre was located in the city of Jhelum. In early September 1947, Pakistani personnel arrived from the 2nd Punjab's regimental centre in Meerut (present-day Uttar Pradesh, India) and Indian personnel were dispatched to either the 11th Sikhs or the 6th Rajputanas regimental centres depending on whether they were Sikhs or Hindu Rajputs.

The Punjab Regiment at its height totalled 58 battalions; however, 11 were transferred in 1980 to the Pakistan Army's newly raised Sind Regiment.

=== Class and religious composition ===
Before the Partition of India in 1947, the ethno-religious composition of the Punjab Regiment consisted of: Punjabi Muslims (50%); Punjabi Hindus (40%); Punjabi Sikhs (10%). Following the regiment's transfer to the Pakistan Army, it became largely religiously homogenous, comprising mostly Muslims with around 20% ethnic Pashtuns and 80% Punjabis.

== Colonel-in-chief ==
Punjab Regiment distinguished appointments of colonel-in-chiefs;

Colonel-in-Chief	Term start	Term end
Field Marshal Ayub Khan	22 August 1964	21 September 1973
General Asif Nawaz Janjua	13 October 1991	26 April 1992
General Muhammad Aziz Khan	14 January 2002	7 October 2004
General Khalid Shameem Wynne	19 October 2010	6 October 2013

- Lieutenant General Shahid Baig Mirza, 11th Punjab 27th Punjabis
- Lieutenant General Majid Ehsan, 6th Punjab
- Lieutenant General Nadeem Anjum, 28th Punjab

== Decorations ==
The Punjab Regiment holds the largest number of decorations in Pakistan Army. Following are the details:

- Victoria Cross - 12
- Nishan-e-Haider - 5
- Hilal-e-Jurrat - 12
- Sitara-e-Jurrat - 113
- Sitara-e-Basalat - 67
- Tamgha-e-Jurrat - 121
- Tamgha-e-Basalat - 357

The above medals are apart from hundreds of other citations.

== Battle Honours ==
- Pre-Partition Honours (Up to 1947)

Peking 1860-90

Somaliland 1901-1904

Givenchy 1914

Labassee 1914

France and Flanders 1914

Ypres 1915

The Sangro

East Africa 1914-17

Malaya 1941-42

Italy 1943-45

Bourbon

Bhartipore

Keren

Kohima

North Africa 1940-43

Burma 1942-45

Pegu 1945

North Arakan

Cession II

Alam El Halfa

Nagpore

Imphal

El Alamein

Gothic Line

Loss

Omars

The Irrawaddy

Assaye

Nyangao

Singapore Island

China

Meiktila

Kilimanjaro

Abyssinia

AVA

Mandalay

- Post-Partition Honours (1947 onwards)

Kashmir 1948-1965

Kasur 1965

Sialkot 1965

Jaurian 1965

Sulemanki 1965

Chawinda 1965

Dewa Chhamb 1965

Rajisthan 1965

Ran of Kutch 1965

Lahore 1965-1971

Chhamb 1971

Pakka 1971

Khem Karan 1971

Hussainiwala

Hajipir 1965

Qaisar I hind 1971

Zafarwal 71

Sabuna 71

Shakargarh 1971

== Deaths of Punjab Regiment soldiers ==
The Punjab Regiment has lost thefollowing numbers of soldiers:

- 1948 War - 130
- 1965 War - 408
- 1971 War - 1,292
- Operation Al Mizan - 613
- Internal/ External Security Duties - 677

== Recipients of the Nishan-e-Haider ==
The Nishan-e-Haider is the highest gallantry award awarded by Pakistan to those who show an incredible amount of valour and courage on the battlefield in the face of staunch adversity. To date, only ten soldiers have been awarded this honour, of which five belonged to the Punjab Regiment:

1. Captain Muhammad Sarwar, 2nd Punjabis (1910 – 27 July 1948)
1. Major Muhammad Tufail, 13th Punjabis (1943 – 7 August 1958)
1. Major Aziz Bhatti, 17th Punjabis (1928 – 10 September 1965)
1. Naïk Muhammad Mahfuz, 15th Punjabis (1944 – 17 December 1971)
1. Sowar Muhammad Hussain, 20 Lancers Punjabis (1949 - 10 December 1971)

As a form of respect, deceased recipients are given the honorary title of Shaheed (Arabic: شهيد; šahīd), which denotes martyrdom, whilst living recipients are dubbed Ghazi (Arabic: غازي; ġāzī), the Islamic term for warrior.

== Notable former personnel ==
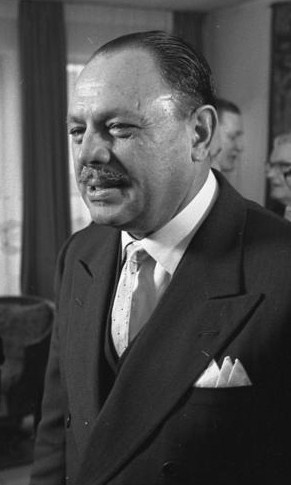
Field Marshal Ayub Khan, former President of Pakistan

- Field Marshal Ayub Khan Tareen, N.Pk., H.aPk., HJ - 5 Punjab
- Lieutenant General Ziaur Rahman Bir Uttom, Hilal-i-Jur'at ( President of Bangladesh)
- General Asif Nawaz Janjua - 5 Punjab
- General Muhammad Shariff - 3 Punjab
- General Aziz Khan, NI(M), SBt, HI(M) - 12 Punjab
- General Khalid Shameem Wynne, NI(M) - 20 Punjab
- Brigadier Nusrat Khan Sial, SBt - 35 Punjab
- Major Malik Munawar Khan Awan, SJ, King of Rajouri (reposted to 21 AK regt from 5 Punjab).
- Lieutenant General Aftab Ahmad Khan
- Lieutenant General Tariq Pervez Khan, Escaped from Fathergarh (India) - 6 Punjab
- Lieutenant General Masood Aslam, HI, HI(M), SJ - 4 Punjab
- Lieutenant General Amir Abdullah Khan Niazi, HJ& Bar, MC 2 Punjab & 5 Punjab
- Major General Adam Khan[MC] 2 Punjab
- Major General Sher Ali Khan Pataudi, HJ 1st Punjab
- Lieutenant General Shahid Baig Mirza HI(M), 11 Punjab 27th Punjabis
- Lieutenant General Asim Saleem Bajwa, TBt - 34 Punjab
- Lieutenant General Zaheerul Islam - 13 Punjab
- Lieutenant Colonel Ghulam Hussain Chaudry, HJ - 3 Punjab
- Major Raja Nadir Pervez, SJ & Bar - 6 Punjab
- Major Tufail Mohammad Shaheed, NH - 13 Punjab
- Major Raja Aziz Bhatti Shaheed, NH - 17 Punjab
- Captain Muhammad Sarwar Shaheed, NH - 2 Punjab
- Captain Ishar Singh, VC, OBI - 12 Punjab (28th Punjabis)
- Lieutenant Karamjeet Singh Judge, VC 12 Punjab (4/15th Punjab)
- Hon. Lieutenant Raja Painda Khan Janjua, OBI - 1/14th Punjab (5 Sherdil)
- Jemadar Abdul Latif Khan Tarin, IDSM, 82nd Punjabis.
- Lance Naik Muhammad Mahfuz Shaheed, NH - 15 Punjab
- Lance Naik Sher Shah, VC - 19 Punjab
- Naik Gian Singh, VC
- Naik Shahamad Khan, VC, 89th Punjabis
- Brigadier Ghulam Qadir Chadhar, Sitara-e-Imtiaz (Military) - 19 Punjab
- Brigadier Ashfaq Hassan, Sitara-e-Imtiaz (Military) - 16 Punjab 40th Pathans (Ghazian E Dograi) / 10 Punjab (Commanded in Ops Area, Dera Bugti, ((Bugti Ops)).

== Current units ==
It is the largest infantry regiment of the Pakistan Army, consisting of 63 battalions.

- 1 Punjab (1759)(First First)
- 2 Punjab (1761)(Haideri Awal)
- 3 Punjab (1776)(Fateh Hussainiwala)
- 4 Punjab (1788)(Beasi)
- 5 Punjab (1858)(Sherdil)
- 6 Punjab (1857)(MIB) (Quaid's Guard)
- 7 Punjab (1857)(Al Masoor)
- 8 Punjab (1857)(CRACKS)
- 9 Punjab (1857)(Mian Mir Battalion)
- 10 Punjab (1857)(Sarbakaf)
- 11 Punjab (1857)(Al Battar)
- 12 Punjab (1857)(Jundullah)
- 13 Punjab (1857)(Haider Nishan)
- 14 Punjab (1857)(Do Solah)(The Oldest Peacekeeper)
- 15 Punjab (1857)(33 Muhammadi)
- 16 Punjab (1780)(Ghazian E Dograi)
- 17 Punjab (1818)(The Haideris)(Lahore 65)
- 18 Punjab (1941)(Desert Hawks)
- 19 Punjab (1941)(MIB)(Sher Shah)
- 20 Punjab (1942)(Second To None)
- 21 Punjab (1965)(LAT)(Harawal)
- 22 Punjab (1965)(MIB)(Allah Humma Sale Allah Muhammadin)
- 23 Punjab (1965)(LAT)(Zarb e Aahan)
- 24 Punjab (1965)(Pasban)
- 25 Punjab (1965)(Asadullah)
- 26 Punjab (1965)(LAT)(Dar Kasar)
- 27 Punjab (1965)(Fateh Dharam)
- 28 Punjab (1965)(LAT)(Al Mujahid)
- 29 Punjab (1965)(Janbaz)
- 30 Punjab (1965)(Al Uqaab)
- 31 Punjab (1965)(Yalghaari)
- 32 Punjab (1965)(Al Sabir)(Batees Punjabis)
- 33 Punjab (1965)(Sarfarosh)
- 34 Punjab (1965)(LAT)(Sheranwali) (The Tank Hunters)
- 35 Punjab (1966)(Hawi)
- 36 Punjab (1966)(Cheeti)
- 37 Punjab (1966)(Pur dum))
- 38 Punjab (1966)(Al Momin Ba Waqar)
- 39 Punjab (1969)(JANNISARS)
- 40 Punjab (1971)(Zafarwal)
- 41 Punjab (1971)(Allah Wali)
- 42 Punjab (1971)(Sabit Qadam)
- 43 Punjab (1971)(Sadiq)

--

--

--

--

--

--

--

--

--

--

- 54 Punjab (1971)(MIB)(Jannisar) (First Punjabi MIB)
- 55 Punjab (1971)(Kanigaram Tiger)
- 56 Punjab (1971)(Chewanja Saifullah)
- 57 Punjab (1971)(Cheeta)

--

- 59 Punjab (1980)(LAT)(Al Muhafiz)
- 60 Punjab (1987)(Al Shuja)
- 61 Punjab (1987)(MIB)(Al saf)

--

- 63 Punjab (1972)(LAT)(Akbari Sarwari)

--

--

--

- 67 Punjab (1972)(LAT)(Fakhar E Sehra)

--

- 69 Punjab (1990)(Mardan E Hur)
- 70 Punjab (1990)(Al Muhafiz)
- 71 Punjab (1993)(MIB)(Zinda Dill)
- 72 Punjab (2008)(Har Dam Har Qadam)
- 73 Punjab (2012)(Rajgal Tigers)
- 74 Punjab (2015)(Batur o Bedar)
- 75 Punjab (2018)
- 76 Punjab (2020)
- 77 Punjab (2020)
- 78 Punjab (2021)
- 79 Punjab (2025)

Two Light Commando Battalions (LCB)

- 1 LCB (2010)(Al Mirsab)
- 7 LCB (2018)(Al Mubarizun)

Affiliated units

- 20th Lancers
- 42nd Lancers

== Alliances ==
- 1st Bn with The Royal Irish Regiment (27th (Inniskilling) 83rd, 87th and Ulster Defence Regiment)
- 8th Bn and 14th Bn with The Duke of Lancaster's Regiment (King's Lancashire and Border)
- 12th, 14th, 15th, and 17th Bn with The Princess of Wales's Royal Regiment (Queen's and Royal Hampshires)
- 13th Bn with The Mercian Regiment

== See also ==
- Punjab Regiment (India)
- Azad Kashmir Regiment
- Baloch Regiment
- Frontier Force Regiment
- Northern Light Infantry Regiment
- Sindh Regiment
