= 33rd Punjabis =

- Active: 1857–1922
- Country: British India
- Branch: British Indian Army
- Type: Infantry
- Size: 2 Battalions
- Uniform: Red; faced green
- Engagements: Indian Mutiny 1857–58; Third Anglo-Burmese War 1885–87; First World War 1914–18; Third Afghan War 1919

The 33rd Punjabis was an infantry regiment of the British Indian Army. It was raised in 1857, as the Allahabad Levy. It was designated as the 33rd Punjabis in 1903 and became 3rd Battalion 16th Punjab Regiment in 1922. In 1947, it was allocated to the Pakistan Army, where it continues to exist as 15th Battalion The Punjab Regiment.

== Early history ==
The regiment was raised during the upheaval of the Indian Mutiny, by Lieutenant EH Longmore at Allahabad on 23 December 1857, as the Allahabad Levy. The regiment took part in the Third Anglo-Burmese War of 1885–87.

== 33rd Punjabis ==
Subsequent to the reforms brought about in the Indian Army by Lord Kitchener in 1903, the regiment's designation was changed to 33rd Punjabis. During the First World War, the 33rd Punjabis served in Egypt, France, Aden and German East Africa. In 1917, the regiment raised a second battalion, which was disbanded after the war. In 1919, the 33rd Punjabis participated in the Third Afghan War.

== Subsequent history ==
In 1921–22, a major reorganization was undertaken in the British Indian Army leading to the formation of infantry groups of four to six battalions. Among these was the 16th Punjab Regiment, formed by grouping the 33rd Punjabis with the 30th, 31st and 46th Punjabis, and the 9th Bhopal Infantry. The battalion's new designation was 3rd Battalion 16th Punjab Regiment. During the Second World War, the battalion fought in the Malayan Campaign and was taken prisoner by the Japanese on Singapore Island following the British surrender on 15 February 1942. It was re-raised in 1946. In 1947, the 16th Punjab Regiment was allocated to Pakistan Army. In 1956, it was merged with the 1st, 14th and 15th Punjab Regiments to form one large Punjab Regiment, and 3/16th Punjab was redesignated as 15 Punjab. In 1948, the battalion fought in the war with India in Kashmir, while during the 1965 Indo-Pakistan War, it fought at the Rann of Kutch and Chhamb-Jaurian. In 1971, it served in Lahore Sector.

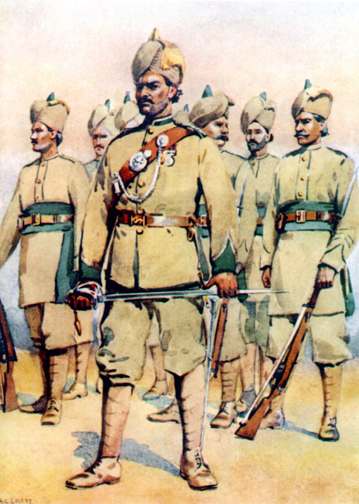
Punjabi Muslims of 33rd Punjabis. Watercolour by Major AC Lovett, 1910.

== Genealogy ==
- 1857 Allahabad Levy
- 1861 37th Regiment of Bengal Native Infantry
- 1861 33rd Regiment of Bengal Native Infantry
- 1864 33rd (Allahabad) Regiment of Bengal Native Infantry
- 1885 33rd Regiment of Bengal Infantry
- 1891 33rd (Punjab) Regiment of Bengal Infantry
- 1901 33rd Punjab Infantry
- 1903 33rd Punjabis
- 1917 1st Battalion 33rd Punjabis
- 1922 3rd Battalion 16th Punjab Regiment
- 1956 15th Battalion The Punjab Regiment

== See also ==
- 16th Punjab Regiment
- Punjab Regiment
