= 31st Punjabis =

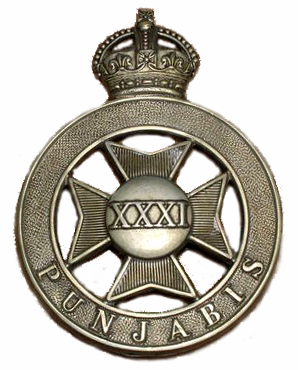
- Active: 1857 - 1922
- Country: British India
- Branch: British Indian Army
- Type: Infantry
- Size: 1 Battalion
- Uniform: Red; faced white
- Engagements: Indian Mutiny 1857-58; Bhutan War 1864-66; Second Afghan War 1878-80; Malakand 1895-97; First World War 1914-18

Commanders
- Notable commanders: Lt Gen Akhtar Hussain Malik, HJ; Lt Gen Abdul Ali Malik, HJ

The 31st Punjabis was an infantry regiment of the British Indian Army. It was raised in 1857, as Van Cortlandt's Levy. The regiment was designated as the 31st Punjabis in 1903 and became 2nd Battalion 16th Punjab Regiment in 1922. In 1947, it was allocated to the Pakistan Army, where it continues to exist as 14th Battalion The Punjab Regiment.

== Early history ==
The regiment was raised during the upheaval of the Indian Mutiny, by General Van Cortlandt at Ferozepur on 22 May 1857, as Van Cortlandt's Levy. Their class composition was Punjabi Muslims, Sikhs, Dogras, Hill Rajputs and Gurkhas. The regiment took part in the Bhutan War of 1864-66, the Second Afghan War of 1878-80, and the Siege of Malakand in 1895-97. At Malakand, Sir Winston Churchill, who was covering the campaign as a war correspondent for The Daily Telegraph, was temporarily attached with the regiment. The future Prime Minister of Great Britain cut an impressive figure on his grey charger, being in the thick of action everywhere. He, however, was disappointed when he was not allowed to take over the command of the regiment!.

== 31st Punjabis ==
Subsequent to the reforms brought about in the Indian Army by Lord Kitchener in 1903, the regiment's designation was changed to 31st Punjabis. During the First World War, the 31st Punjabis served in Mesopotamia and Salonika in Greece. It then served at Constantinople, Turkey as part of Allied occupation forces.

== Subsequent history ==
In 1921–22, a major reorganization was undertaken in the British Indian Army, leading to the formation of large infantry groups of four to six battalions. Among these was the 16th Punjab Regiment, formed by grouping the 31st Punjabis with the 30th, 33rd and 46th Punjabis, and the 9th Bhopal Infantry. The battalion's new designation was 2nd Battalion 16th Punjab Regiment. During the Second World War, the battalion fought in the Malayan Campaign and was taken prisoner by the Japanese on Singapore Island following the British surrender on 15 February 1942. It was re-raised in 1946. In 1947, the 16th Punjab Regiment was allocated to Pakistan Army. In 1956, it was merged with the 1st, 14th and 15th Punjab Regiments to form one large Punjab Regiment, and 2/16th Punjab was redesignated as 14 Punjab. In 1948, the battalion participated in the war with India in Kashmir, while in 1965, it fought in the Chhamb-Jaurian and Sialkot Sectors. During the Indo-Pakistan War of 1971, 14 Punjab fought in the Battle of Chhamb in Kashmir.

== Genealogy ==
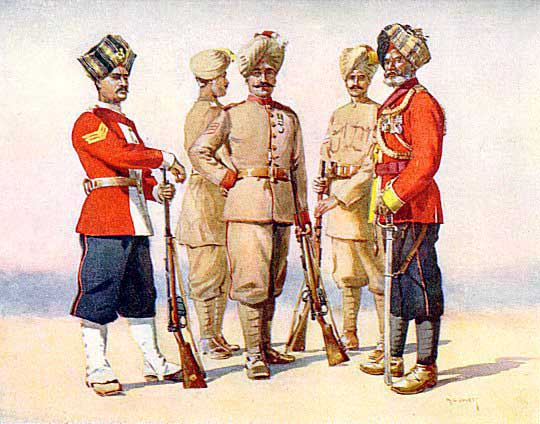
31st and 27th Punjabis. Watercolour by Major AC Lovett, 1910.

- 1857 Van Cortlandt's Levy
- 1857 Bloomfield's Sikhs
- 1857 23rd Regiment of Punjab Infantry
- 1861 35th Regiment of Bengal Native Infantry
- 1861 31st Regiment of Bengal Native Infantry
- 1864 31st (Punjab) Regiment of Bengal Native Infantry
- 1885 31st (Punjab) Regiment of Bengal Infantry
- 1901 31st Punjab Infantry
- 1903 31st Punjabis
- 1922 2nd Battalion 16th Punjab Regiment
- 1956 14th Battalion The Punjab Regiment

== See also ==
- 16th Punjab Regiment
