= Ishar Singh =

Sikh soldier, recipient of the Victoria Cross (1895–1963)

Captain Ishar Singh VC, OBI
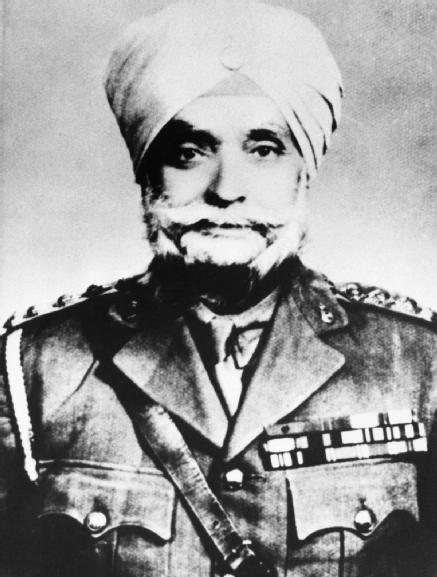
- Captain Ishar Singh
- Born: 30 December 1896; Jhorran, Ludhiana
- Died: 2 December 1963 (aged 67); Died in village Nainwan, Garhshankar in Hoshiarpur district, Punjab
- Military career
- Allegiance: British India
- Branch: British Indian Army
- Service years: 1914-1945
- Rank: Captain
- Units: 28th Punjabis
- Conflicts: First World War; First Waziristan Campaign; Second World War
- Awards: Victoria Cross; Order of British India; Royal Victorian Medal; 1914-15 Star; British War Medal 1914-1920; Victory Medal; India General Service Medal 1908-35 with clasps Waziristan 1919-21, Waziristan 1921-24; 1939-45 Star; Burma Star; War Medal 1939-45; India Service Medal; King George V Silver Jubilee Medal; King George VI Coronation Medal; Queen Elizabeth II Coronation Medal

Sardar Bahadur Captain Ishar Singh VC, OBI (30 December 1895 – 2 December 1963) was a soldier in the British Indian Army and a recipient of the Victoria Cross, the highest award for gallantry in the face of the enemy that can be awarded to British and Commonwealth forces. Born at Jhorran (Ludhiana), he was the first Sikh to receive the Victoria Cross.

== Victoria Cross ==
He was 25 years old, and a sepoy in the 28th Punjabis, Indian Army during the Waziristan Campaign when, on 10 April 1921, near Haidari Kach he undertook the actions which led his senior officer, Captain Bernard Oddie, to recommend him for the award of a VC. The citation was published in a supplement to the London Gazette of 25 November 1921:

War Office, 25th November, 1921.

His Majesty the KING has been graciously pleased to approve of the award of the Victoria Cross to the undermentioned: —

No. 1012 Sepoy Ishar Singh, 28th Punjabis, Indian Army

For most conspicuous bravery and devotion to duty on the 10th April, 1921, near Haidari Kach (Waziristan). When the convoy protection troops were attacked, this Sepoy was No. l of a Lewis Gun- Section. Early in the action he received a very severe gunshot wound in the chest, and fell beside his Lewis gun. Hand-to-hand fighting having commenced, the British officer, Indian officer, and all the Havildars of his company were either killed or wounded, and his Lewis gun was seized by the enemy.

Calling up two other men he got up, charged the enemy, recovered the Lewis gun, and, although, bleeding profusely, again got the gun into action.

When his Jemadar arrived he took the gun from Sepoy Ishar Singh, and ordered him to go back and have his wound dressed.

Instead of doing this the Sepoy went to the medical officer, and was of great assistance in pointing out where the wounded were, and in carrying water to them. He made innumerable journeys to the river and back for this purpose. On one occasion, when the enemy fire was very heavy, he took the rifle of a wounded man and helped to keep down the fire. On another occasion he stood in front of the medical officer who was dressing, a wounded man, thus shielding him with his body. It was over three hours before he finally submitted to be evacuated, being then too weak from loss of blood to object.

His gallantry and devotion to duty were beyond praise. His conduct inspired all who saw him.

He later achieved the rank of captain, and served in the Second World War. In addition to the Victoria Cross, he was awarded the prestigious Order of British India, First Class, which carried with it the title of "Sardar Bahadur."

His medal is held in the collection of Lord Ashcroft.

== State Honours ==
- Commonwealth of Nations:
  - Victoria Cross
- British India:
  - Order of British India
