= 27th Punjabis =

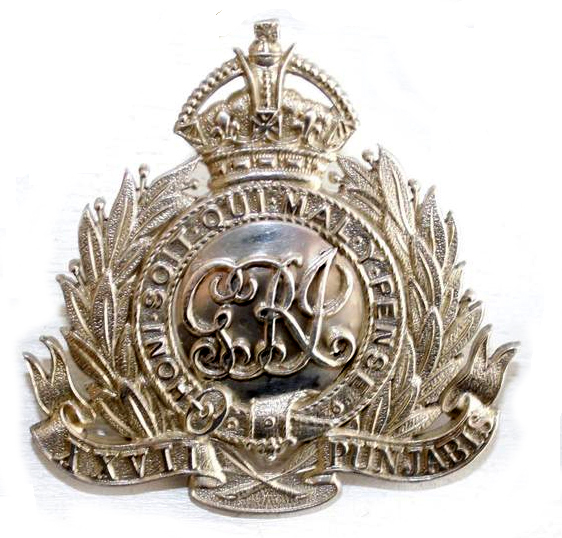
- Active: 1857 – 1922
- Country: British India
- Branch: Army
- Type: Infantry
- Size: 2 Battalions
- Uniform: Drab; faced scarlet
- Engagements: Indian Mutiny 1857–58; Second Anglo-China War 1860–62; Second Afghan War 1878–80; Third Burma War 1885–87; Somaliland Campaign 1901–04; First World War 1914–18

The 27th Punjabis were an infantry regiment of the British Indian Army. It was raised in 1857, as the 19th Regiment of Punjab Infantry. It was designated as the 27th Punjabis in 1903 and became 3rd Battalion 15th Punjab Regiment in 1922. In 1947, it was allocated to the Pakistan Army, where it continues to exist as 11th Battalion The Punjab Regiment.

== Early history ==
The regiment was raised during the upheaval of the Indian Mutiny, at Rawalpindi on 19 June 1857, as the Regiment of Rawalpindi. In 1860, it was sent to China to fight in the Second Anglo-China War. In 1861, the regiment was permitted to use the Royal Cypher within the Garter on its appointments for its meritorious services. During the Second Afghan War of 1878–80, as part of the Peshawar Valley Field Force, it advanced into the Khyber Pass to clear Afghan forces at Ali Masjid. In 1885, the regiment participated in the Third Burma War. In 1901, the 27th Punjab Infantry was dispatched to British Somaliland to suppress the Dervish State led by Diiriye Guure of the Dervish State.

== 27th Punjabis ==
Subsequent to the reforms brought about in the Indian Army by Lord Kitchener in 1903, the regiment's designation was changed to 27th Punjabis.

During the First World War, the infantrymen served on the North West Frontier of India, Egypt, France and Mesopotamia. The regiment raised a second battalion in 1918, which was disbanded after the war.

== Subsequent history ==
In 1921–22, a major reorganization was undertaken in the British Indian Army leading to the formation of large infantry groups of four to six battalions. Among these was the 15th Punjab Regiment, formed by grouping the 27th Punjabis with the 25th, 26th, 28th and 29th Punjabis. The battalion's new designation was 3rd Battalion 15th Punjab Regiment. During the Second World War, the battalion served in British Somaliland, Aden, Persia, Iraq, Syria and Italy. It was converted into a Machine-Gun Battalion in 1946. In 1947, the 15th Punjab Regiment was allocated to Pakistan Army. In 1956, it was merged with the 1st, 14th and 16th Punjab Regiments to form one large Punjab Regiment, and 3/15th Punjab was redesignated as 11 Punjab. During the Indo-Pakistani War of 1965, it was deployed in the Sylhet Sector of East Pakistan, while in 1971, it served in the Shakargarh Sector.

== Genealogy ==
27th Punjabis in France. Illustration by Paul Sarrut, 1915.

- 1857 Regiment of Rawalpindi
- 1857 19th Regiment of Punjab Infantry
- 1861 31st Regiment of Bengal Native Infantry
- 1861 27th Regiment of Bengal Native Infantry
- 1864 27th (Punjab) Regiment of Bengal Native Infantry
- 1885 27th (Punjab) Regiment of Bengal Infantry
- 1901 27th Punjab Infantry
- 1903 27th Punjabis
- 1918 1st Battalion 27th Punjabis
- 1922 3rd Battalion 15th Punjab Regiment
- 1956 11th Battalion The Punjab Regiment

== See also ==
- 15th Punjab Regiment
- Punjab Regiment
