= Karamjeet Singh Judge =

Indian soldier recipient of the Victoria Cross (1923-1945)

- Born: 25 May 1923; Kapurthala, India
- Died: 18 March 1945 (aged 21); Meiktila, Burma
- Military career
- Allegiance: British India
- Branch: British Indian Army
- Rank: Lieutenant
- Units: 4th Battalion, 15th Punjab Regiment
- Conflicts: World War II; Pacific War; Burma campaign; Burma campaign (1944–1945); Battle of Meiktila (DOW)
- Awards: Victoria Cross

Karamjeet Singh Judge VC (25 May 1923 – 18 March 1945) was an Indian recipient of the Victoria Cross, the highest and most prestigious award for gallantry in the face of the enemy that can be awarded to British and Commonwealth forces.

== Early life ==
His father was chief of police at Kapurthala. Karamjeet was a member of the Indian National Congress Party. He regarded his brother Ajeet Singh Judge as a patriot for joining the Royal Indian Artillery. He seems to have been persuaded to join the army rather than continue political studies at Lahore College. Thus he enrolled for Officer Training School, Bangalore. He opted to join the Pioneer corps to get near the Burma front-line. At his brother's written request, he was accepted by 15th Punjab Regiment.

=== Army career ===
He was commissioned as an infantry subaltern at Ambala, before transfer to 39th Indian Division Nearing an important moment in the war, when the Allies were about to launch the largest counter-offensive of the war so far, he arrived with 4th Battalion into the British 14th Army to make the drive for Rangoon.

General Slim's masterful strategy was simple: to divide the Japanese forces on a railway junction at Meiktila. The ensuing battles were among the most savage and bitter of the Second World War. The brilliant thrust captured the garrison town that controlled the crossing over the Irrawaddy River. The Japanese launched a series of counter-attacks to desperately try to keep the road to Mandalay open for their retreat. Myingyan became an important river-head supply base.

4/15th were part of Lt-Col Hubert Conroy's 33 Brigade whose job was to clear the forest in a triangle around Nyaunga bridgehead. South of Nyaunga they attacked Sindewa, a heavily defended Japanese position in the jungle, thick with trees. There were extensive minefields.

On 18 March 1945 during the Battle of Meiktila in Burma (now Myanmar), he was ordered to capture a cotton mill. The assault began with an attack on the strategic river port of Myingan. By all accounts even before receiving the posthumous award, Singh was a brave soldier. Always eager to engage in actions he confided in C/O 4/15th Major Johnny Whitmarsh-Knight his desire for glory. They arrived on 17 March 1945. The following morning the Jat Company comprising Indian soldiers was to spearhead the assault. They were supported by the Sherman tanks of No 2 Troop, C Squadron, 116 Regiment (Gordon Highlanders), Royal Armoured Corps, commanded by Lt Hugh Baker.

Singh was just 21 years old, and a Lieutenant in the 4th Battalion, 15th Punjab Regiment, in the British Indian Army during World War II when he performed the following deeds for which he was awarded the VC during the Battle of Myingan which raged over four days. Baker exclaimed later that Karamjeet was the "bravest soldier I have ever seen."

Though facing stiff enemy resistance (a total of almost 200 enemy shells fell around the tanks and infantry during the attack) and in unsuitable terrain for tanks, he dominated the battlefield by effectively strategizing and battling until he fell in the last stages of the action.

The citation reads:

The KING has been graciously pleased to approve the posthumous award of the VICTORIA CROSS to:—

Lieutenant Karamjeet Singh JUDGE (IEC. 5504), 15th Punjab Regiment, Indian Army.

In Burma, on 18th March, 1945, a Company of the 15th Punjab Regiment, in which Lieutenant Karamjeet Singh Judge was a Platoon Commander, was ordered to capture the Cotton Mill area on the outskirts of Myingyan. In addition to numerous bunkers and stiff enemy resistance a total of almost 200 enemy shells fell around the tanks and infantry during the attack. The ground over which the operation took place was very broken and in parts was unsuitable for tanks. Except for the first two hours of this operation, Lieutenant Karamjeet Singh Judge's platoon was leading in the attack, and up to the last moment Lieutenant Karamjeet Singh Judge dominated the entire battlefield by his numerous and successive acts of superb gallantry.

Time and again the infantry were held up by heavy medium machine gun and small arms fire from bunkers not seen by the tanks. On every such occasion Lieutenant Karamjeet Singh Judge, without hesitation and with a complete disregard for his own personal safety, coolly went forward through heavy fire to recall the tanks by means of the house telephone. Cover around the tanks was non-existent, but Lieutenant Karamjeet Singh Judge remained completely regardless not only of the heavy small arms fire directed at him, but also of the extremely heavy shelling directed at the tanks. Lieutenant Karamjeet Singh Judge succeeded in recalling the tanks to deal with bunkers which he personally indicated to the tanks, thus allowing the infantry to advance.

In every case Lieutenant Karamjeet Singh Judge personally led the infantry in charges against the bunkers and was invariably first to arrive. In this way ten bunkers were eliminated by this brilliant and courageous officer.

On one occasion, while he was going into the attack, two Japanese suddenly rushed at him from a small nullah with fixed bayonets. At a distance of only 10 yards he killed both.

About fifteen minutes before the battle finished, a last nest of three bunkers was located, which were very difficult for the tanks to approach. An enemy light machine gun was firing from one of them and holding up the advance of the infantry. Undaunted, Lieutenant Karamjeet Singh Judge directed one tank to within 20 yards of the above bunker at great personal risk and then threw a smoke grenade as a means of indication. After some minutes of fire, Lieutenant Karamjeet Singh Judge, using the house telephone again, asked the tank commander to cease fire while he went in with a few men to mop up. He then went forward and got within 10 yards of the bunker, when the enemy light machine gun opened fire again, mortally wounding Lieutenant Karamjeet Singh Judge in the chest. By this time, however, the remaining men of the section were able to storm this strong point, and so complete a long and arduous task.

During the battle, Lieutenant Karamjeet Singh Judge showed an example of cool and calculated bravery.

In three previous and similar actions this young officer had already proved himself an outstanding leader of matchless courage. In this, his last action, Lieutenant Karamjeet Singh Judge gave a superb example of inspiring leadership and outstanding courage.

— London Gazette, 3 July 1945.

== Bibliography ==
- Britain at War: A History of Conflict: History Monthly, issue 102, October 2015, p.68-74
