= 16th Punjab Regiment =

Former infantry regiment of the armies of British India and Pakistan

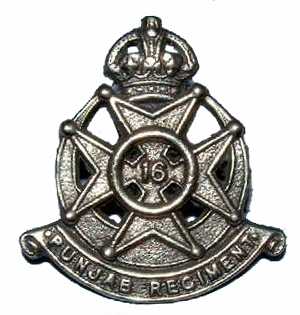
- Regimental cap badge of the 16th
- Active: 1922–1956
- Country: British India (1922–1947); Pakistan (1947–1956)
- Branch: British Indian Army; Pakistan Army
- Type: Infantry
- Regimental Centre: Multan (1923); Sialkot (1946)
- Uniform colours: Scarlet, white
- Engagements: Indian Rebellion of 1857; Bhutan War; Second Anglo−Afghan War; Third Anglo−Burmese War; World War I; Third Anglo−Afghan War; World War II; First Indo−Pakistani War

Commanders
- Notable commanders: General James Travers (VC, CB)

The 16th Punjab Regiment was an infantry regiment of the British Indian Army from 1922 to 1947. Upon the Partition of India, it was transferred to the newly-raised Pakistan Army. It ceased to exist in this form in 1956, when it was amalgamated with the 1st, 14th and 15th Punjab regiments to form the Punjab Regiment, an existing infantry regiment of the Pakistan Army.

== Early history ==
The 16th Punjab Regiment was formed in 1922 by amalgamation of the 30th, 31st, 33rd and 46th Punjabis, and 9th Bhopal Infantry. Except for the 46th Punjabis, who were raised in 1900, the rest were raised during the upheaval of the Indian Mutiny in 1857-59. The 30th and 31st Punjabis were raised in 1857, as the 22nd Regiment of Punjab Infantry and Van Cortlandt's Levy respectively. The 33rd Punjabis were also raised in 1857, as the Allahabad Levy, while the 9th Bhopal Infantry was raised in 1859, as the Bhopal Levy from the remnants of loyal elements of the Bhopal Contingent.

The 30th and 31st Punjabis served in the Bhutan War of 1864-66 and all the battalions saw service on the North West Frontier of India. The 30th and 31st Punjabis along with the 9th Bhopal took part in the Second Afghan War of 1878-80, while the 33rd Punjabis served in the Third Anglo-Burmese War of 1885-87.

== First World War ==
The 30th Punjabis served with distinction in the German East Africa, while their 2nd Battalion served in the Palestine Campaign. The regiment raised a total of three new battalions during the war. Another regiment that raised three battalions was the 9th Bhopal Infantry, who were dispatched to the killing fields of France and Flanders in 1914. The regiment suffered heavy losses at the Battles of Neuve Chapelle, Festubert, Givenchy and the Second Ypres. In 1915, they arrived in Mesopotamia, where Sepoy Chatta Singh was awarded the Victoria Cross for exceptional valour. By the time they returned home, only fifteen men remained of those who had sailed for France in 1914.

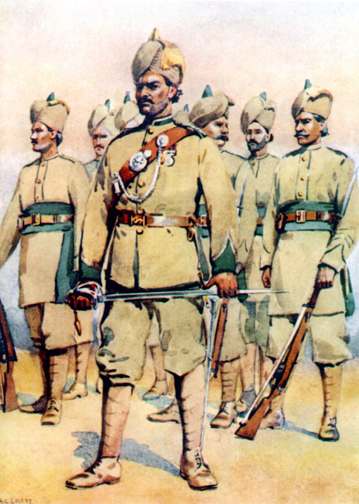
Punjabi Muslims of the 33rd Punjabis; Watercolour by Alfred Crowdy Lovett, 1910.

- 30th Punjabis - India, German East Africa, Egypt.
- 2/30th Punjabis - Raised in 1918. India, Egypt, Palestine.
- 3/30th Punjabis - Raised in 1918. India.
- 4/30th Punjabis - Raised in 1918. India.
- 31st Punjabis - India, Mesopotamia, Greece, Turkey.
- 33rd Punjabis - India, Egypt, France, Aden, German East Africa.
- 2/33rd Punjabis - Raised in 1917. India.
- 9th Bhopal Infantry - India, France, Egypt, Mesopotamia.
- 2/9th Bhopal Infantry (The Delhi Regiment) - Raised in 1917. India, Mesopotamia.
- 3/9th Bhopal Infantry - Raised in 1917. India, Mesopotamia.
- 4/9th Bhopal Infantry - Raised in 1918. India.
- 46th Punjabis - India, Egypt.

All war-raised battalions were disbanded after the war. In 1921-22, a major reorganization was undertaken in the British Indian Army leading to the formation of large infantry groups of four to six battalions. Among these was the 16th Punjab Regiment. The line-up of battalions for Solah Punjab was:

- 1st Battalion - 30th Punjabis
- 2nd Battalion - 31st Punjabis
- 3rd Battalion - 33rd Punjabis
- 4th Battalion - 9th Bhopal Infantry
- 10th (Training) Battalion - 46th Punjabis.

The class composition of the new regiment was Punjabi Muslims, Sikhs and Dogras. The new regimental badge consisted of a Maltese cross with a Muslim crescent and a Sikh quoit, surmounted by a Tudor crown with a scroll below. The uniform was scarlet with white facings. Multan in the Punjab was chosen as the permanent station for the Training Battalion.

== Second World War ==
The 2nd and 3rd Battalions were captured by the Japanese at Singapore. The 1st, 5th and 7th Battalions fought in Burma, and the 4th Battalion's fought in Africa and Italy. Lance Naik Sher Shah of the 7th Battalion was awarded the Victoria Cross in Burma. During the war, the 16th Punjab Regiment suffered a total of 2744 casualties including 990 killed or died of wounds.

- 1st Battalion - India, Burma, Dutch East Indies.
- 2nd Battalion - India, Malaya. Captured by the Japanese at Singapore in February 1942. They would end up on a Japanese "hell ship" Buyo Maru. Unit re-raised in 1945.
- 3rd Battalion - India, Malaya, Singapore. Captured by the Japanese in February 1942. Re-raised in 1946 as 3rd (Para) Battalion.
- 4th Battalion - India, North Africa, Italian East Africa, Italy, Palestine.
- 5th Battalion - Raised in 1940. India, Burma. Re-designated as 2/16th Punjab in 1945.
- 6th Battalion - Raised in 1941. India, Ceylon. Re-designated as 3/16th Punjab in 1946.
- 7th Battalion - Raised in 1941. India, Burma, Malaya. Disbanded January 1948; re-raised October 1948.
- 9th Battalion - Raised in 1943 by re-designation of 25th Garrison Battalion on conversion to active status. India. Disbanded 1945.
- 25th Garrison Battalion - Raised in 1941. India. Redesignated as 9/16th Punjab in 1943 on conversion to active status. India.
- 26th Garrison Battalion - Raised in 1942. India. Disbanded 1946.

== Post-independence history ==
On the independence of Pakistan in 1947, the 16th Punjab Regiment was allotted to Pakistan Army. At the time, the active battalions were 1st, 2nd, 3rd, 4th and 7th. Jats, Sikhs and Dogras were transferred to the Indian Army and the regiment's new class composition was fixed as Punjabis and Pathans. In 1948, the 1st, 3rd and 4th Battalions fought in the war with India in Kashmir. In 1956, a major reorganization was undertaken in the Pakistan Army and larger infantry groups were created by amalgamating the existing infantry regiments. As a result, the 16th Punjab Regiment was amalgamated with the 1st, 14th and 15th Punjab Regiments to form one large Punjab Regiment. The four regimental centres were also merged and the combined centre moved to Mardan. The line-up of the new regiment was:

- 1 Punjab - 1/1st Punjab
- 2 Punjab - 2/1st Punjab
- 3 Punjab - 3/1st Punjab
- 4 Punjab - 5/1st Punjab
- 5 Punjab - 1/14th Punjab
- 6 Punjab - 2/14th Punjab (Duke of Cambridge's Own)
- 7 Punjab - 3/14th Punjab
- 8 Punjab - 4/14th Punjab
- 9 Punjab - 1/15th Punjab
- 10 Punjab - 2/15th Punjab
- 11 Punjab - 3/15th Punjab
- 12 Punjab - 4/15th Punjab
- 13 Punjab - 1/16th Punjab
- 14 Punjab - 2/16th Punjab
- 15 Punjab - 3/16th Punjab
- 16 Punjab - 5/14th Punjab (Pathans)
- 17 Punjab - 4/16th Punjab (Bhopal)
- 18 Punjab - 7/1st Punjab
- 19 Punjab - 7/16th Punjab
- 20 Punjab - 14/1st Punjab

== Battle honours ==
Afghanistan 1879-80, Burma 1885-87, Chitral, Tirah, Malakand, Punjab Frontier, La Bassee 1914, Messines 1914, Armentieres 1914, Festubert 1914, Givenchy 1914, Ypres 1915, St Julien, Aubers, Loos, France and Flanders 1914-15, Macedonia 1918, Suez Canal, Egypt 1915-16, Megiddo, Nablus, Palestine 1918, Aden, Tigris 1916, Kut al Amara 1917, Baghdad, Mesopotamia 1915-18, NW Frontier India, 1915, 1916–17, Behobeho, Narungombe, Nyangao, East Africa 1917-18, Afghanistan 1919, Mescelit Pass, Mt Engiahat, Massawa, Abyssinia 1940-41, Sidi Barrani, Omars, Benghazi, El Alamein, Mareth, Akarit, Djebel Garci, Tunis, North Africa 1940-43, Cassino I, Italy 1943-45, Kroh, Jitra, Gurun, Ipoh, Kampar, The Muar, Singapore Island, Malaya 1941-42, Fort White, North Arakan, Kaladan, Maungdaw, Ngakyedauk Pass, Imphal, Tamu Road, Litan, Arakan Beaches, Burma 1942-45, Kashmir 1948.

== See also ==
- Punjab Regiment
- Punjab (region)
- Punjabis
