= 15th Punjab Regiment =

Former regiment of the armies of British India and Pakistan

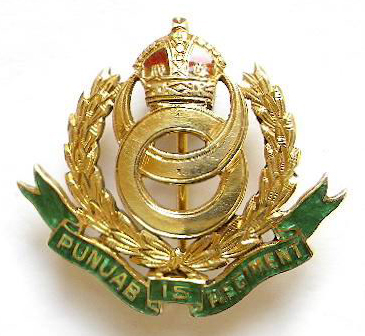
- Active: 1922–1956
- Country: British India (1922–1947); Pakistan (1947–1956)
- Branch: British Indian Army; Pakistan Army
- Type: Infantry
- Regimental centre: Sialkot, Punjab, Pakistan
- Colours
- Engagements: Second Opium War (1856–1860); Indian Rebellion of 1857 (1857–1858); Khasi and Jaintia Expedition (1862–1863); Duar War (1864–1865); Lushai Expedition (1871–1872); Second Anglo-Afghan War (1878–1880); Third Anglo-Burmese War (1885–1887); Anglo-Somali War (1900–1920); Xinhai Revolution (1911–1912); World War I (1914–1918); Burmese Rebellion (1930–1932); World War II (1939–1945); First Indo-Pakistani War (1947–1948)

The 15th Punjab Regiment was a infantry regiment of the British Indian Army from 1922 to 1947 and of the Pakistan Army from 1947 to 1956. Following its allotment to Pakistan after the partition of India in 1947, it was amalgamated in 1956 with the 1st Punjab Regiment, the 14th Punjab Regiment, and the 16th Punjab Regiment to form the present-day Punjab Regiment.

== Early history ==
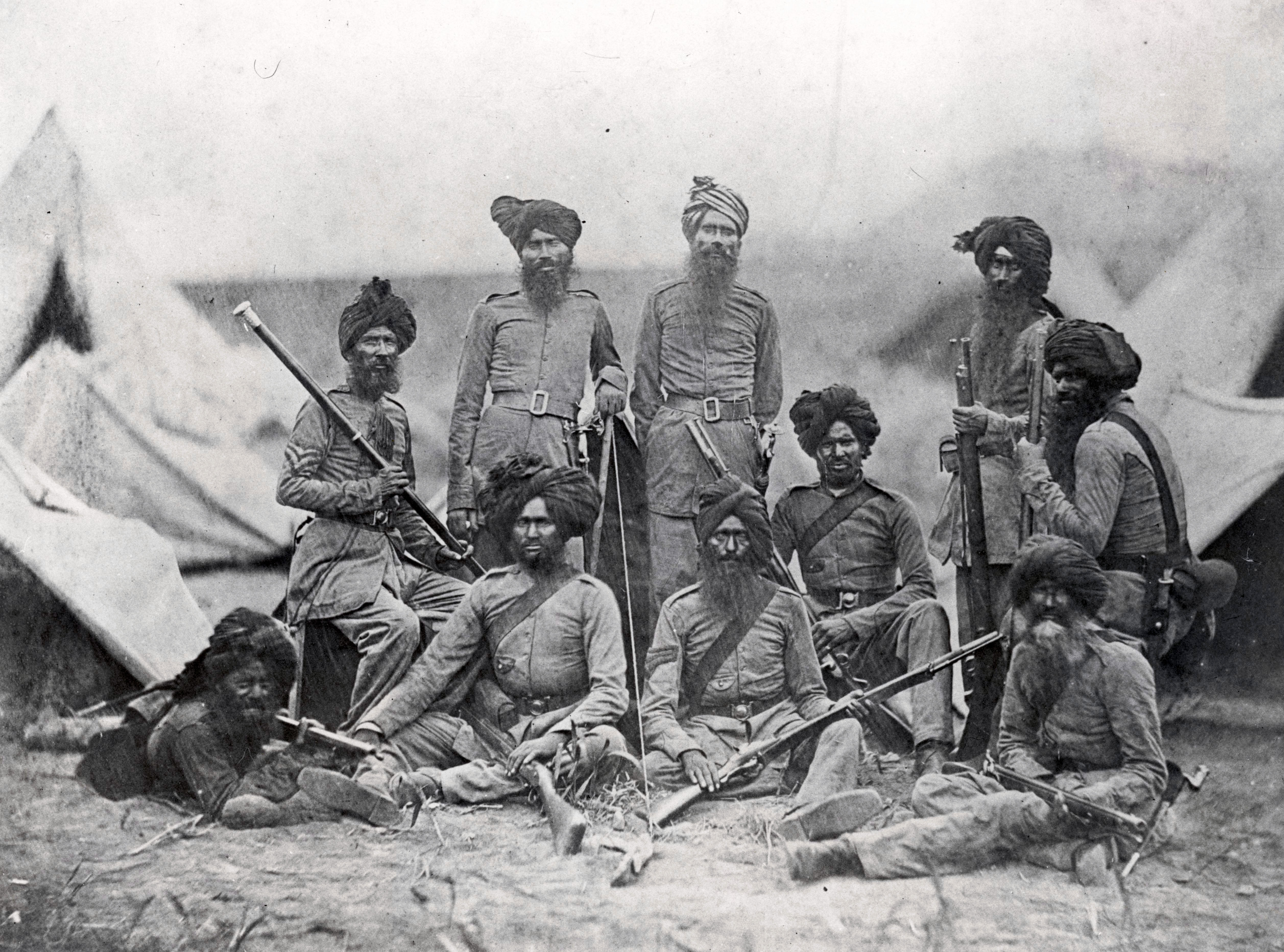
Sikh officers of the British 15th Punjab Infantry regiment, 1858, by Felice Beato

The regiment was formed in 1922 by the amalgamation of the 25th, 26th, 27th, 28th, and 29th Punjabis into the British Indian Army. All five battalions were raised during the upheaval of the Indian Rebellion of 1857 by John Lawrence in Punjab. The 27th Punjabis served in Qing China during the Second Opium War in 1860–1862, while the 26th and 29th Punjabis participated in the Bhutan War of 1864–1866. All battalions saw service on the North-West Frontier of British India (now Khyber Pakhtunkhwa, Pakistan) and took part in the Second Anglo-Afghan War of 1878–1880, while the 26th and 27th Punjabis also served in the Third Anglo-Burmese War of 1885–1887. In 1901, the 27th Punjabis were dispatched to British Somaliland to suppress the resistance movement led by Diiriye Guure of the Dervish State.

== Formation ==
When the 15th Punjab Regiment was formed in 1922, it was organised into active regular battalions, one training battalion and with one, later two Indian Territorial Force battalions (including additions until World War II):

- 1st Battalion, former 25th Punjabis
- 2nd Battalion, former 26th Punjabis
- 3rd Battalion, former 27th Punjabis
- 4th Battalion, former 28th Punjabis
- 10th (Training) Battalion, former 29th Punjabis
- 11th (Territorial) Battalion
- 12th (Territorial) Battalion, formed 1939

== World War II ==
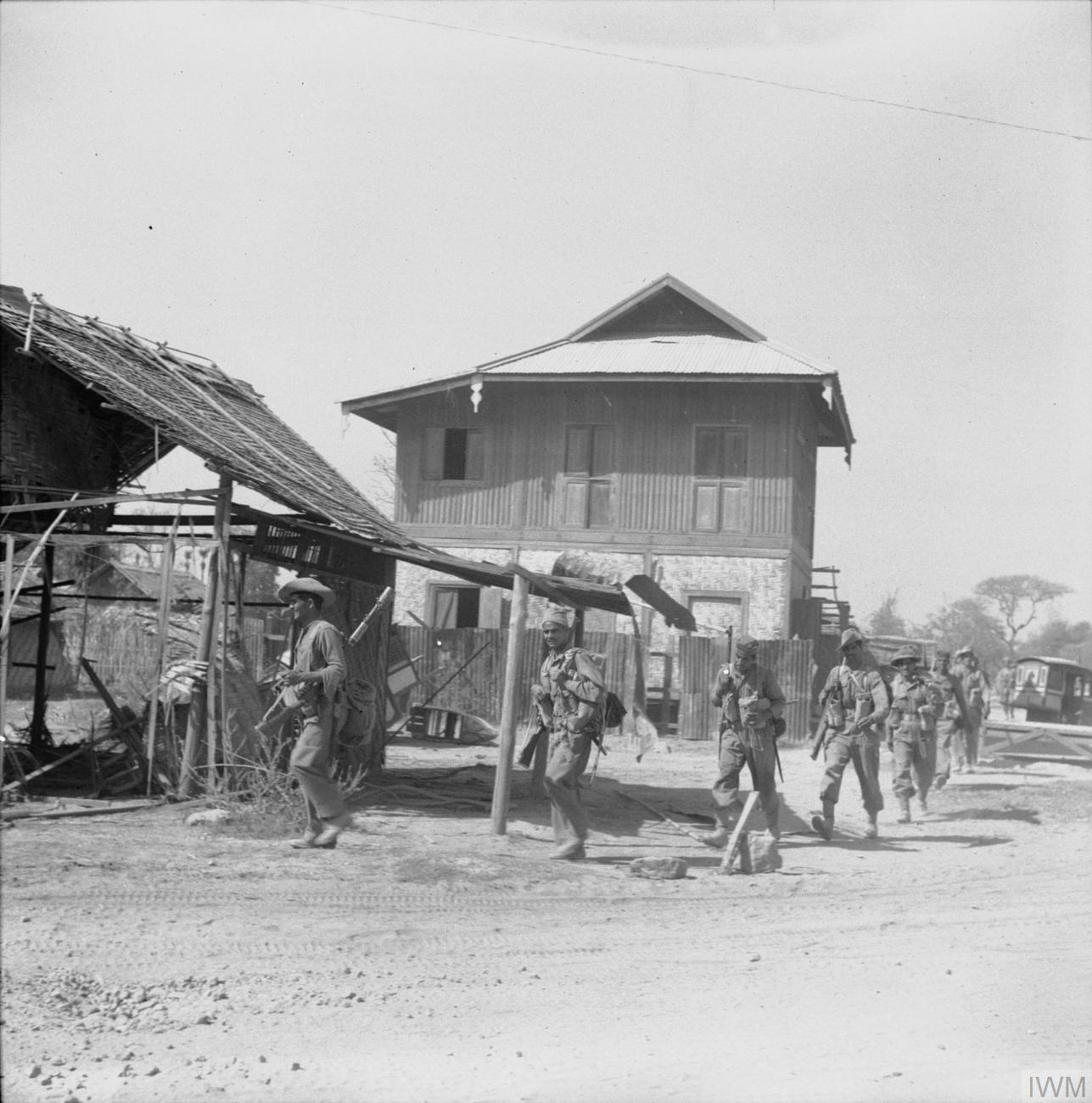
Men of the 1st Battalion, 15th Punjab Regiment taking up positions on the perimeter of Fort Dufferin at Mandalay, 10-11 March 1945.

During the Second World War, the 15th Punjab Regiment raised / created nine additional active battalions. Most of the active battalions were engaged in fighting the Japanese in the Far East except the 3rd Battalion, which fought in Somaliland and Italy. The performance of the 4th Battalion in Burma in particular was outstanding. The battalion suffered 921 casualties and was awarded numerous gallantry awards including two Victoria Crosses to Lieutenant Karamjeet Singh Judge and Naik Gian Singh.

- 1st Battalion - India, Burma.
- 2nd Battalion - India, Singapore, Sarawak, Borneo. The fighting withdrawal of the regiment from Sarawak across Borneo and final surrender on 3 April 1942 to the Japanese is detailed in the following website.
- 3rd Battalion - India, Somaliland, Aden, Persia, Iraq, Syria, Italy. Became a Machine-Gun Battalion in 1946.
- 4th Battalion - India, Burma, Siam, Malaya.
- 5th Battalion - Raised in 1940. India. Disbanded 1946.
- 6th Battalion - Raised in 1941. India, Ceylon, Burma. Disbanded 1947.
- 7th Battalion - Raised in 1941. India, Burma. Disbanded 1946.
- 8th Battalion - Raised in 1941 by re-designation of the 11th (Territorial) Battalion. India. Disbanded 1946.
- 9th Battalion - Raised in 1941 by re-designation of the 12th (Territorial) Battalion. India, Burma. Disbanded 1947.
- 10th (Training) Battalion - Converted into the 15th Punjab Regimental Training Centre in 1943.
- 11th (Territorial) Battalion - Mobilized in 1939. Re-designated as 8/15th Punjab on conversion to active status in 1941. Disbanded 1946.
- 12th (Territorial) Battalion - Raised in 1939. Re-designated as 9/15th Punjab on conversion to active status in 1941.
- 14th Battalion - Raised in 1942. India. Disbanded 1943.
- 15th Battalion - Raised in 1942. India. Broken up into garrison companies in 1945.
- 16th Battalion - Raised in 1943 by re-designation of 25th Garrison Battalion on conversion to active status. India. Re-designated as 2/15th Punjab in 1946.
- 25th Garrison Battalion - Raised in 1941. On conversion to active status, became the 16th Battalion. India.
- 26th Garrison Battalion - Raised in 1942. India. Abu Atoll. Disbanded 1946.
- 27th (Jind) Garrison Battalion - Raised in 1943 in Jind State. India. Disbanded 1946.
- Machine-Gun Battalion - Raised in 1942. Transferred to the Indian Artillery to form the 15th Punjab Anti-tank Regiment. Disbanded 1944.

== Post-independence history ==
On the independence of Pakistan in 1947, the 15th Punjab Regiment was allotted to Pakistan Army. At the time, the active battalions were 1st, 2nd, 3rd and 4th. Sikhs and Jats were transferred to the Indian Army and the regiment's new class composition was fixed as Punjabis and Pathans. The 2nd Battalion was reformed as a Medium Machine Gun battalion, moving to Kohat in early 1946; by the time of Partition in August 1947 all the British and non-Muslim officers had left, except for one Indian officer, the Adjutant and he left once all Indian Army personnel moved to India. The unit helped to escort the 3rd Grenadiers from Kohat to Rawalpindi, after they had been ambushed twice by Pathan tribes. Other references are the books by Kaushik Roy and Frederick Llewellyn Freemantle (listed below).

The regiment's badge was also modified and the Sikh quoit was replaced by an Islamic star. In 1948, the 2nd and 3rd Battalions fought in the war with India in Kashmir. In 1956, a major reorganization was undertaken in the Pakistan Army and larger infantry groups were created by amalgamating the existing infantry regiments. As a result, the 15th Punjab Regiment was amalgamated with the 1st, 14th and 16th Punjab Regiments to form one large Punjab Regiment. The four regimental centres were also merged and the combined centre moved to Mardan. The line up of the new regiment was:

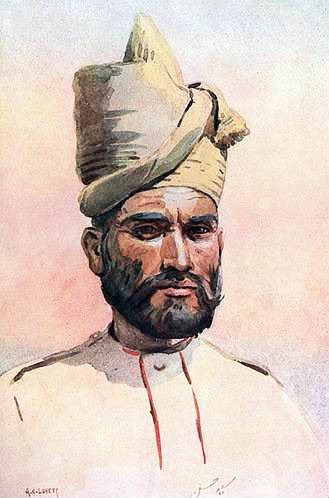
Sepoy 26th Punjabis. Watercolour by Major AC Lovett, 1910

- 1 Punjab - 1/1st Punjab
- 2 Punjab - 2/1st Punjab
- 3 Punjab - 3/1st Punjab
- 4 Punjab - 5/1st Punjab
- 5 Punjab - 1/14th Punjab
- 6 Punjab - 2/14th Punjab (Duke of Cambridge's Own)
- 7 Punjab - 3/14th Punjab
- 8 Punjab - 4/14th Punjab
- 9 Punjab - 1/15th Punjab
- 10 Punjab - 2/15th Punjab
- 11 Punjab - 3/15th Punjab (Al Battaar) (البَتَّار)
- 12 Punjab - 4/15th Punjab
- 13 Punjab - 1/16th Punjab
- 14 Punjab - 2/16th Punjab
- 15 Punjab - 3/16th Punjab
- 16 Punjab - 5/14th Punjab (Pathans)
- 17 Punjab - 4/16th Punjab (Bhopal)
- 18 Punjab - 7/1st Punjab
- 19 Punjab - 7/16th Punjab
- 20 Punjab - 14/1st Punjab

== Battle honours ==
China 1860–62, Ali Masjid, Peiwar Kotal, Charasiah, Kabul 1879, Ahmad Khel, Kandahar 1880, Afghanistan 1878–80, Burma 1885–87, Chitral, Somaliland 1901–04, Loos, France and Flanders 1915, Suez Canal, Egypt 1915, Megiddo, Sharon, Palestine 1918, Tigris 1916, Kut al Amara 1917, Baghdad, Mesopotamia 1915–18, Persia 1918, NW Frontier, India 1917, Kilimanjaro, East Africa 1914–17, Berbera, Assab, Abyssinia 1940–41, Tug Argan, British Somaliland 1940, The Sangro, The Moro, Cassino II, Gothic Line, The Senio, Italy 1943–45, West Borneo 1941–42, South East Asia 1941–42, Rathedaung, Donbaik, Jail Hill, Naga Village, Kyaukmyaung Bridgehead, Mandalay, Fort Dufferin, Meiktila, Nyaungu Bridgehead, Capture of Meiktila, Taungtha, Myingyan, The Irrawaddy, Yenaungyaung 1945, Kama, Pyawbwe, Toungoo, Pegu 1945, Sittang 1945, Burma 1942–45.

== See also ==
- Punjab Regiment (Pakistan)
