= 3rd (Lahore) Division =

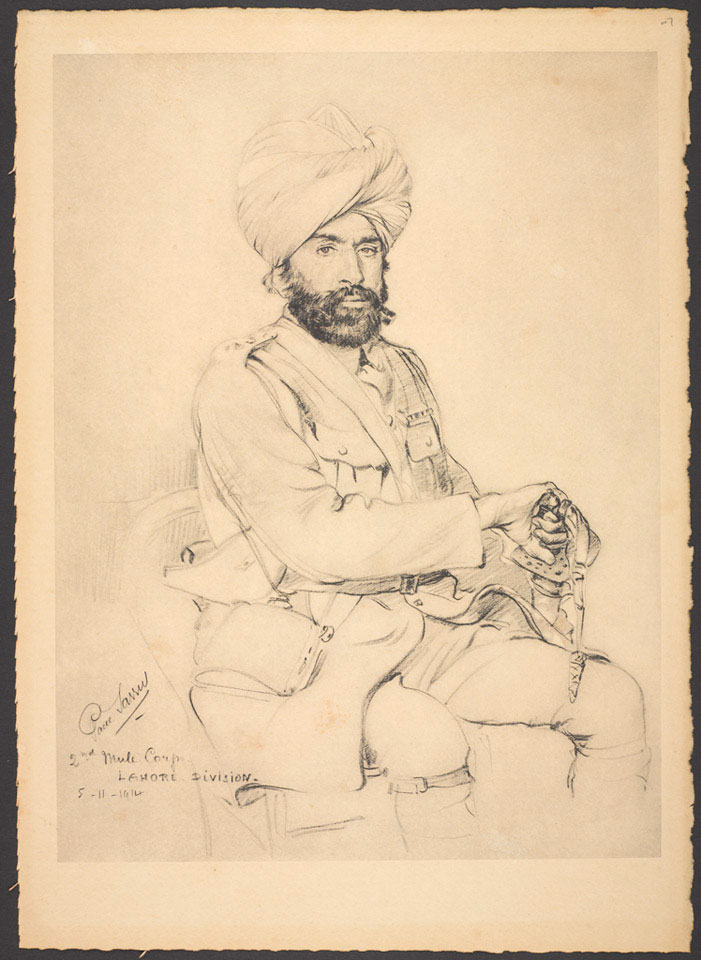
- '2nd Mule Corps, Lahore Division', 5 November 1914
- Active: 1852 – ?
- Country: India
- Branch: British Indian Army
- Type: Infantry
- Garrison/HQ: Mian Mir (Lahore)
- Engagements: Western Front: Battle of La Bassee; First Battle of Messines; Battle of Armentieres; Battle of Neuve Chapelle; Second Battle of Ypres; Battle of Aubers Ridge; Battle of Festubert; Battle of Loos; Mesopotamian Campaign; Palestine Campaign: Battle of Megiddo

Commanders
- Notable commanders: Sir Hugh Henry Gough, VC; Frederick Walter Kitchener; Sir Arthur Hoskins

The 3rd (Lahore) Division was an infantry division of the Indian Army and before 1895, the Bengal Army, first organised in 1852. It saw service during World War I as part of the Indian Corps in France before being moved to the Middle East where it fought against troops of the Ottoman Empire.

== Pre-Mutiny ==
The Lahore Division first appears in the Indian Army List in 1852, when the short-lived Cis-Jhelum Division was renamed (at the same time the Trans-Jhelum Division at Peshawar was renamed the Punjab Division). The Cis-Jhelum Division in turn had previously been the Saugor Division, a longstanding formation of the Bengal Army. At this period Divisions were primarily administrative organisations controlling the brigades and stations in their area, rather than field formations, but they did provide field forces when required. The Lahore Division absorbed the Lahore Field Force under Brigadier Sir James Tennant, which had formed part of the Army of the Punjab since 1847. Lahore Fort was occupied by the British after the First Anglo-Sikh War and the city of Lahore was annexed in 1849 at the conclusion of the Second Anglo-Sikh War. In 1852 a military cantonment (known until 1906 as Mian Mir) was established outside the city.

=== Composition 1852 ===
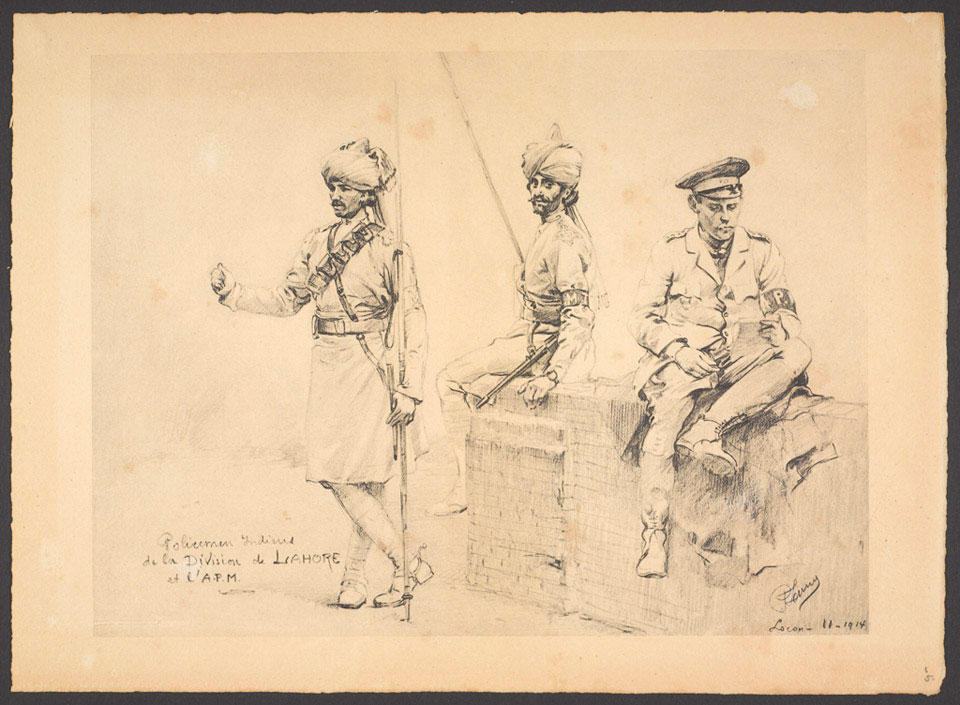
'Policemen Indiens de la Division de Lahore et l'A.P.M Locon', November 1914

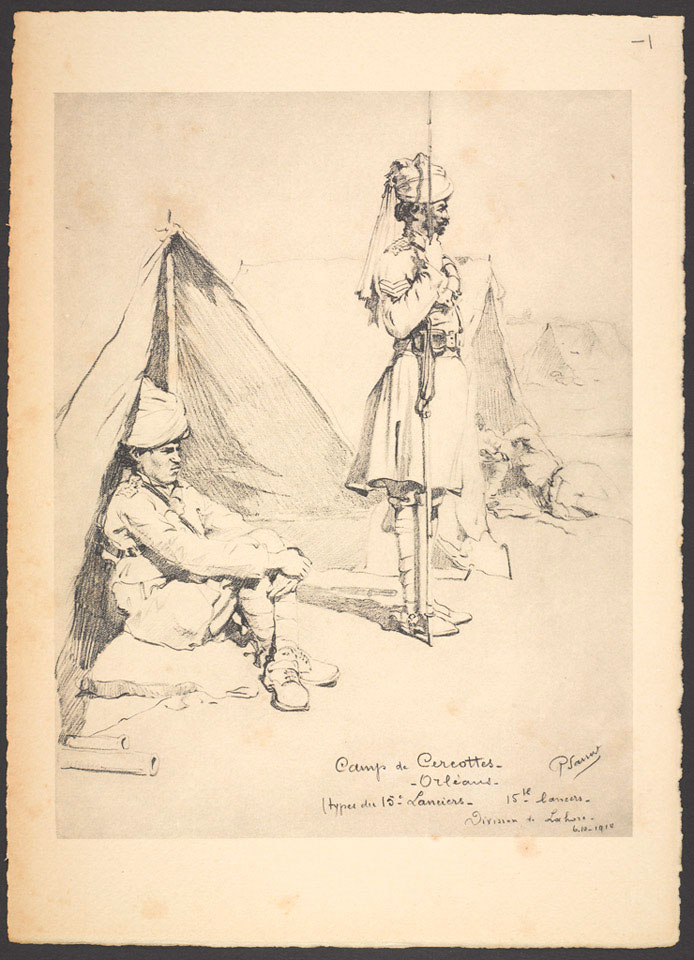
3rd (Lahore Division) in camp at Cercottes near Orléans in France.

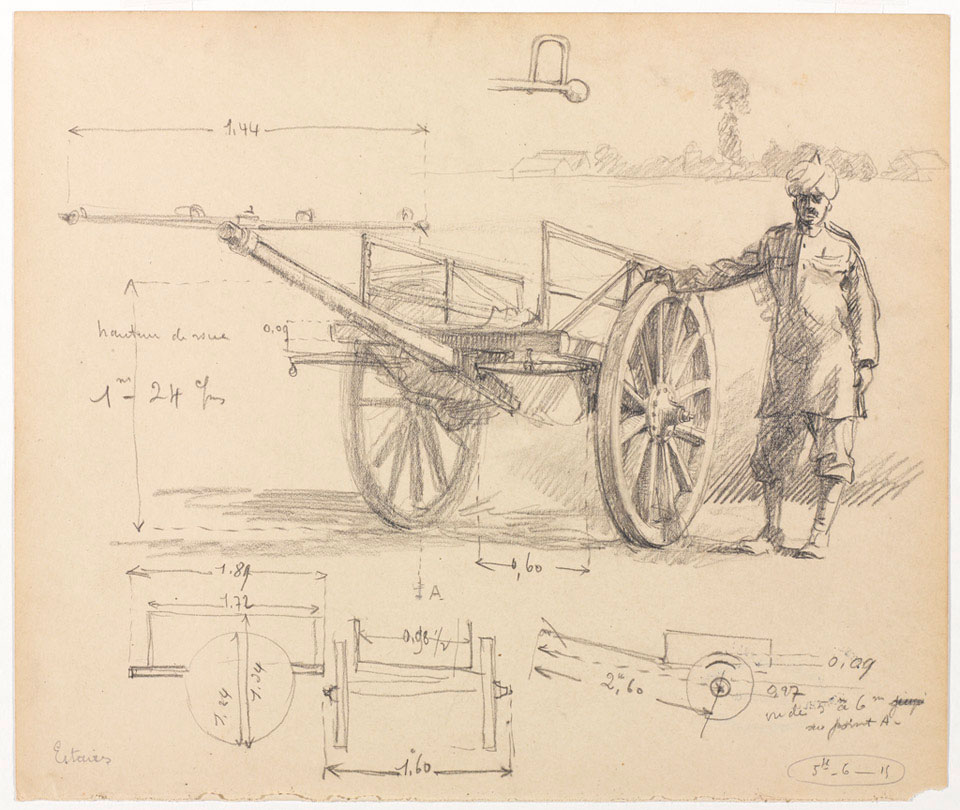
Study of a sepoy, standing beside a limber, with diagrams and dimensions of the limber, Estaires, France, 5 June 1915

General Officer Commanding (GOC): Brigadier-General Sir John Cheape, KCB, Bengal Engineers (appointed 9 July 1852) (absent commanding Bengal Division in Second Anglo-Burmese War).

Lahore: Commanding Station: Brigadier Sir James Tennant, Bengal Artillery

- HQ, 1st and 2nd Troops, 3rd Brigade, Bengal Horse Artillery
- HQ, 1st, 2nd, 3rd and 4th Companies, 2nd (European) Battalion, Bengal Foot Artillery (1st Company and O Company Ordnance Drivers manning No 7 Light Field Battery (horsedrawn))
- 2nd Company, 8th (Native) Battalion, Bengal Foot Artillery, and D Company Ordnance drivers, manning No 2 Light Field Battery (bullock drawn)
- 4th Company, Bengal Sappers and Miners
- Her Majesty's 96th Foot
- 5th Bengal Native Infantry
- 9th Bengal Native Infantry
- 39th Bengal Native Infantry
- 57th Bengal Native Infantry
- 65th Bengal Native Infantry
- 1st Bengal Irregular Cavalry (Skinner's Horse)
- 18th Bengal Irregular Cavalry

Wazirabad: Brigadier J.R. Hearsey

- 4th Company 7th (Native) Battalion, Bengal Foot Artillery
- Her Majesty's 3rd Light Dragoons
- Her Majesty's 10th Foot
- Her Majesty's 24th Foot
- 21st Bengal Native Infantry
- 32nd Bengal Native Infantry
- 34th Bengal Native Infantry

Sialkot: Lieutenant-Colonel J.T. Lane, Bengal Artillery

- 2nd Troop, 2nd Brigade, Bengal Horse Artillery
- 1st Company, 1st (European) Battalion, Bengal Foot Artillery
- 10th Company, Bengal Sappers and Miners
- 4th Bengal Light Cavalry
- Detachment Her Majesty's 24th Foot
- 63rd Bengal Native Infantry
- 6th Bengal Irregular Cavalry

Govindgarh (Bathinda):

- 3rd Company, 8th (Native) Battalion, Bengal Foot Artillery
- Detachments Her Majesty's 10th Foot and Native Infantry

== Indian mutiny ==
During the 'Indian Mutiny' (or 'First War of Independence') some Indian regiments at the Mian Mir cantonments plotted to mutiny but were disarmed under the guns of a British horse artillery battery and infantry battalion to prevent them seizing Lahore Fort. Later the 26th Bengal Native Infantry at Mian Mir did mutiny, murder some of their officers and escape under cover of a dust storm, but Lahore was held for the remainder of the conflict by British troops and Indians troops loyal to the government.

== Post-Mutiny ==
Over succeeding decades, the stations controlled by Lahore Division varied, and the forces under command were regularly rotated. For example:

=== Composition January 1888 ===
GOC: Maj-Gen Sir Hugh Henry Gough, VC (appointed 1 April 1887)
Aide-de-Camp: Capt H.F.M. Wilson, Rifle Brigade

Divisional HQ: Mian Mir (Lahore Cantonment)

Mian Mir:

- K Battery, 3rd Brigade, Royal Artillery
- O Battery, 4th Brigade, Royal Artillery
- 2nd Battalion, Northumberland Fusiliers
- 5th Regiment Bengal Cavalry
- 24th (Punjab) Regiment, Bengal Infantry
- 32nd (Punjab) Regiment Bengal Infantry (Pioneers)
- 34th (Punjab) Regiment Bengal Infantry (Pioneers)

Fort Lahore:

- 3rd Battery, 1st Brigade, Scottish Division Garrison Artillery, Royal Artillery
- Detachment 2nd Battalion, Northumberland Fusiliers

Multan Brigade:

- B Battery 1st Brigade, Royal Artillery
- 2nd Battalion, West Yorkshire Regiment
- 10th Bengal (Duke of Cambridge's Own) Cavalry
- 25th (Punjab) Regiment Bengal Native Infantry

Ferozepore:

- L Battery, 4th Brigade, Royal Artillery
- 9th Battery, 1st Brigade, Eastern Division Garrison Artillery, Royal Artillery
- 1st Battalion, East Lancashire Regiment
- 17th Regiment of Bengal Cavalry
- 19th (Punjab) Regiment Bengal Native Infantry
- 35th (Sikh) Regiment Bengal Native Infantry

Amritsar:

- Detachment 1st Battalion, Border Regiment
- Detachment 24th (Punjab) Regiment Bengal Native Infantry

Dharamsala:

- 1st Battalion, 1st Goorkha Light Infantry
- 2nd Battalion, 1st Goorkha Light Infantry

Bakloh (near Dalhousie):

- 1st Battalion, 4th Goorkha Regiment
- 2nd Battalion, 4th Goorkha Regiment

== Pre–World War I ==
Under the reforms introduced by Lord Roberts as Commander-in-Chief (CinC) India, the Divisions were renamed 1st Class Districts in 1890. In the next round of reforms inaugurated by Lord Kitchener as CinC, they became numbered divisions with their territorial affiliation as a subsidiary title. The title 3rd (Lahore) Division first appears in the Army List between 30 September and 31 December 1904, as part of Northern Command, with the Jullunder, Sirhind and Ambala brigades under command. Lahore District/3rd (Lahore) Division at this time was under the command of Major General Walter Kitchener, the CinC's younger brother, who commanded it at the Rawalpindi Parade 1905. In 1914 the division, with headquarters at Dalhousie, consisted of the Ferozepore, Jullunder (based at Dalhousie) and Sirhind (based at Kasauli) infantry brigades, and the Ambala cavalry brigade (based at Kasauli).

== World War I ==
=== Western Front 1914 ===
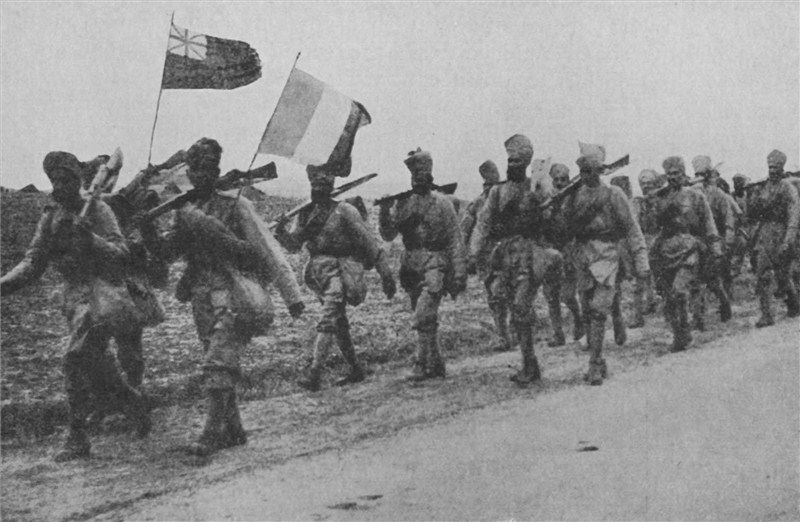
Indian reinforcements who fought at Givenchy in December 1914

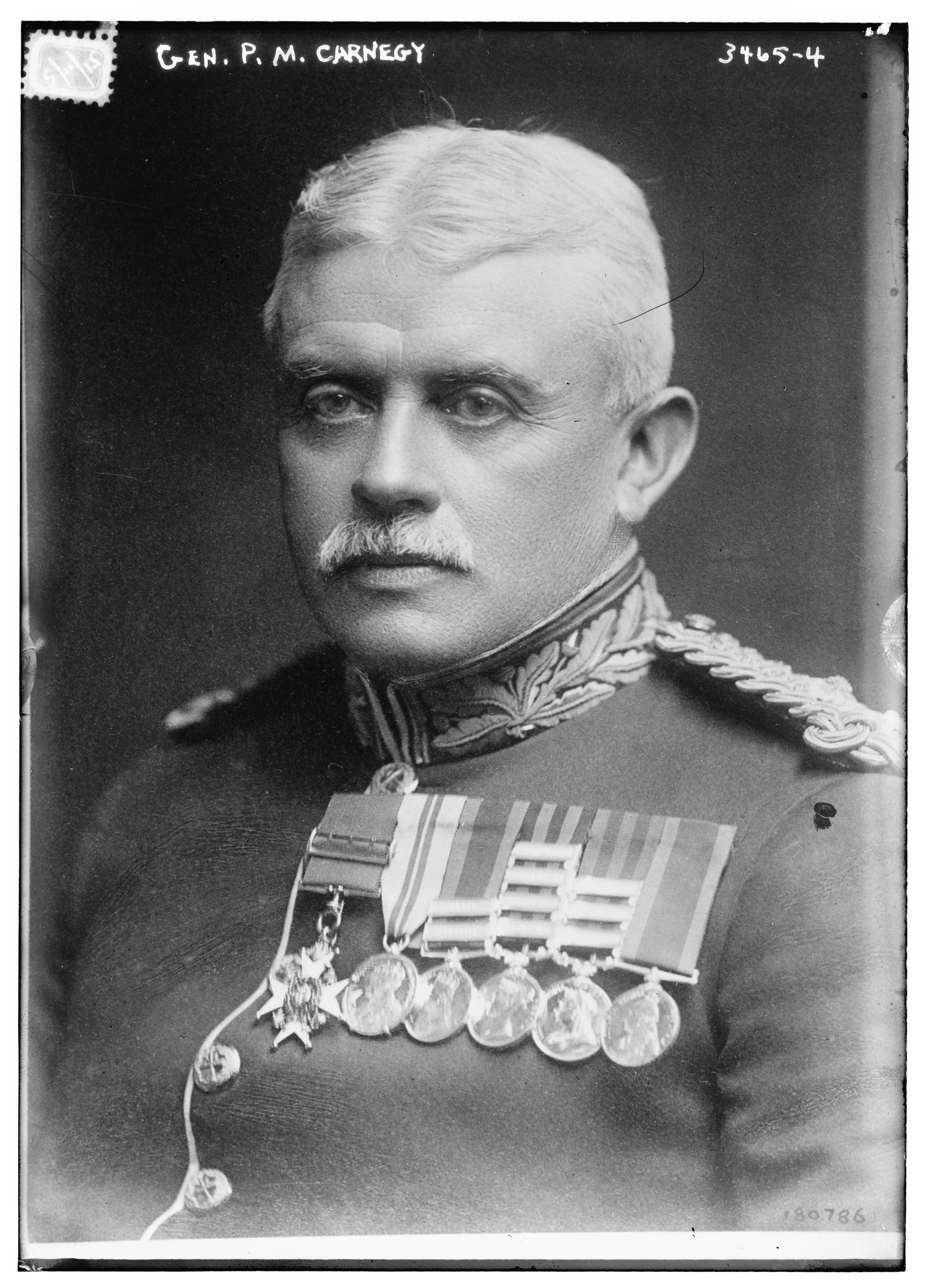
Major General Philip M. Carnegy, Commander of Jullundur Brigade

In 1914 the 3rd (Lahore) Division was part of Indian Expeditionary Force A sent to reinforce the British Expeditionary Force (BEF) fighting in France. The bulk constituted an infantry division as part of Indian Corps, while the Ambala Cavalry Brigade was detached to form part of 1st Indian Cavalry Division in the Indian Cavalry Corps. While in France the division was known as the Lahore Division, and its brigades by their names, to avoid confusion with the 3rd British Division. Despatch from India was delayed by the activities of the German raiders Emden and Konigsberg operating in the Indian Ocean, and by the slow speed of the transport vessels. The first two brigades landed at Marseille on 26 September 1914, but there were further delays while the troops were re-armed with the latest pattern rifle, and the supply train could be improvised, using tradesmen's vans procured locally.

The 3rd Lahore Divisional Area was formed in late 1914 to take over the garrison duties of the 3rd Division when it left for France. The 3rd Lahore Divisional Area was disbanded in May 1917, the responsibilities of the area being taken over by the 16th Division.

Order of Battle October 1914
GOC: Lieut-Gen H. B. B. Watkis, CB

Ferozepore Brigade
GOC: Brig-Gen R.G. Egerton, CB

- 1st Battalion, Connaught Rangers
- 9th Bhopal Infantry
- 57th Wilde's Rifles (Frontier Force)
- 129th Duke of Connaught's Own Baluchis

Jullundur Brigade
GOC: Maj-Gen P.M. Carnegy, CB

- 1st Battalion, Manchester Regiment
- 4th Battalion, Suffolk Regiment (Territorial Force) - joined from GHQ Reserve 4 December 1914
- 15th Ludhiana Sikhs
- 47th Sikhs
- 59th Scinde Rifles (Frontier Force)

Sirhind Brigade - arrived at Marseille from Egypt 30 November, joined 9 December 1914
GOC: Maj-Gen J.M.S. Brunker

- 1st Battalion, Highland Light Infantry
- 125th Napier's Rifles
- 1st Battalion, 1st King George's Own Gurkha Rifles (The Malaun Regiment)
- 1st Battalion, 4th Gurkha Rifles

Divisional Troops: Mounted Troops:

- 15th Lancers (Cureton's Multanis)

Artillery:

- V Brigade, Royal Field Artillery (RFA) - joined 22 November 1914 from 7th (Meerut) Division
  - 64th, 73rd & 81st Batteries, V Brigade Ammunition Column
- XI Brigade, RFA - joined 22 November 1914 from 7th (Meerut) Division
  - 83rd, 84th & 85th Batteries, XI Brigade Ammunition Column
- XVIII Brigade, RFA
  - 59th, 93rd & 94th Batteries, XVIII Brigade Ammunition Column
- 109th Heavy Battery, Royal Garrison Artillery (4.7-inch guns)
  - Heavy Battery Ammunition Column
- Lahore Divisional Ammunition Column

Engineers

- 20th & 21st Companies, 3rd Sappers and Miners

Signals Service:

- Lahore Signal Company

Pioneers

- 34th Sikh Pioneers

Supply & Transport:

- Lahore Divisional train

Medical Units:

- 7th & 8th British Field Ambulances
- 111th, 112th and 113th Indian Field Ambulances

The division finally got into action piecemeal at the simultaneous Battles of La Bassee, 1st Messines and Armentieres along the British part of the Western Front in October–November 1914. The degree to which the division was broken up can be gauged by the 29 October entry in the diary kept by the Indian corps' commander, Lt-Gen Sir James Willcocks:

"Where is my Lahore Division?
Sirhind Brigade detained in Egypt.
Ferozepore Brigade: somewhere in the north, split up into three or four bits.
Jullunder Brigade: Manchesters gone south to (British) 5 Division (this disposes of only British unit)
47th Sikhs: Half fighting with some British division; half somewhere else!
59th Rifles and 15th Sikhs: In trenches
34th Pioneers (divisional troops) also in trenches
15th Lancers: In trenches.
Two companies of Sappers and Miners fighting as infantry with British divisions.
Divisional Headquarters: Somewhere?
Thank heaven the Meerut Division will get a better chance."

When the troops were relieved in November 1914, the reassembled division defended a section of the front in Indian Corps' sector.

=== Western Front 1915 ===
After winter operations (in which the Indian soldiers suffered badly) the division next took part in the Battles of Neuve Chapelle, 2nd Ypres, Aubers Ridge, Festubert and Loos in 1915.

Order of Battle May 1915
GOC: Maj-Gen H.D'U. Keary

Ferozepore Brigade
GOC: Brig-Gen R.G. Egerton, CB

- 1st Battalion, Connaught Rangers
- 1/4th Battalion, London Regiment (Territorial Force)
- 9th Bhopal Infantry
- 57th Wilde's Rifles (Frontier Force)
- 129th Duke of Connaught's Own Baluchis

Jullundur Brigade
GOC: Brig-Gen E.P. Strickland

- 1st Battalion, Manchester Regiment
- 1/4th Battalion, Suffolk Regiment (Territorial Force)
- 1/5th Battalion, Border Regiment (Territorial Force)
- 40th Pathans
- 47th Sikhs
- 59th Scinde Rifles (Frontier Force)

Sirhind Brigade
GOC: Brig-Gen W.G. Walker, VC

- 1st Battalion, Highland Light Infantry
- 4th (Extra Reserve) Battalion, King's (Liverpool Regiment) (Special Reserve)
- 15th Ludhiana Sikhs
- 1st Battalion, 1st King George's Own Gurkha Rifles (The Malaun Regiment)
- 1st Battalion, 4th Gurkha Rifles

Divisional Troops: As before, with addition of XLIII (Howitzer Bde, RA (40th & 57th Batteries)

=== Mesopotamia ===
On 13 August 1915, General Sir John Nixon, commanding Indian Expeditionary Force D in Mesopotamia, requested one of the Indian infantry divisions in France as reinforcements for his advance on Baghdad. Coincidentally, on the same day, the Secretary of State for India, Austen Chamberlain, told the Viceroy of India that he was anxious for the Indian infantry to be withdrawn from France before they had to endure another winter. The system for supplying drafts had broken down and the Indian battalions were becoming very weak after the heavy casualties they had suffered. Although the Secretary of State for War, Lord Kitchener, objected to their withdrawal from the Western Front, orders were issued on 31 October for the two divisions of Indian Corps (3rd (Lahore) and 7th (Meerut) Division) to embark at Marseille for Mesopotamia. They were to leave behind their attached Territorial Force and Special Reserve battalions, and the three RFA brigades of 18-pounder guns of 3rd (Lahore) Division. The two divisions were relieved in the front line on 6 November and were due at Basra in December, but their departure from Marseille was delayed because of fear of submarine attack. 3rd (Lahore) Division finally arrived in Mesopotamia in April 1916 and joined Tigris Corps, too late to relieve 6th (Poona) Division at Kut-al-Amara.

=== Palestine ===
After the fall of Baghdad, the Palestine Campaign was given priority over Mesopotamia, and in March 1918 the division was transferred to Egypt to join Sir Edmund Allenby's Egyptian Expeditionary Force until the end of the war. At the Battle of Megiddo in September 1918 it formed part of Sir Edward Bulfin's XXI Corps on the right flank.

Order of Battle from May 1918
GOC: Maj-Gen A.R. Hoskins

7th Brigade:

- 1st Battalion, Connaught Rangers
- 27th Punjabis
- 91st Punjabis (Light Infantry)
- 2nd Battalion, 7th Gurkha Rifles
- 7th Light Trench Mortar Battery

8th Brigade:

- 1st Battalion, Manchester Regiment
- 47th Sikhs
- 59th Scinde Rifles (Frontier Force)
- 2nd Battalion, 124th Duchess of Connaught's Own Baluchistan Infantry
- 8th Light Trench Mortar Battery

9th Brigade:

- 1st Battalion, Dorsetshire Regiment
- 93rd Burma Infantry
- 105th Mahratta Light Infantry
- 1st Battalion, 1st King George's Own Gurkha Rifles (The Malaun Regiment)
- 9th Light Trench Mortar Battery

Divisional Artillery (reorganised in April 1918):

- IV Brigade, RFA
  - 7, 14 and 66 18-pounder Batteries
  - B/LXIX (Howitzer) Battery
- VIII Brigade, RFA
  - 372 and 373 18-pounder Batteries
  - 428 (Howitzer) Battery
- LIII Brigade, RFA
  - 66 and 374 18-pounder Batteries
  - 430 (Howitzer) Battery

(372, 373 and 374 were new six-gun 18-pounder batteries formed in 64th (2nd Highland) Division's billeting area round Norwich, England, in December 1916 and shipped to Mesopotamia.)

== See also ==
- List of Indian divisions in World War I

== Bibliography ==
- Army Council Instructions Issued During December 1916, London: HM Stationery Office.
- Bullock, David L. (1988). Allenby's War: the Palestine-Arabian Campaigns 1916–1918. London: Blandford. ISBN 0-7137-1869-2.
- Corrigan, Gordon (1999). Sepoys in the Trenches: the Indian Corps on the Western Front, 1914-1915. Staplehurst: Spellmount. ISBN 1-86227-054-6.
- Edmonds, Sir James E. (1995) [1925]. France and Belgium, 1914: Antwerp, La Bassee, Armentieres, Messines, and Ypres, October–November 1914. History of the Great War Based on Official Documents by Direction of the Historical Section of the Committee of Imperial Defence. Vol. II (facs. repr. Imperial War Museum and Battery Press ed.). London: Macmillan. ISBN 1-870423-55-0.
- Edmonds, Sir James Edward; Wynne, Graeme Chamley (1928). Military Operations, France and Belgium, 1915: Battle of Aubers Ridge, Festubert, and Loos. History of the Great War Based on Official Documents by Direction of the Historical Section of the Committee of Imperial Defence. Vol. II. London: Macmillan. OCLC 911247753.
- Haythornthwaite, Philip J. (1996). The World War One Source Book. London: Arms and Armour Press. ISBN 1-85409-351-7.
- Kempton, Chris (1997). A Register of Titles of the Units of the H.E.I.C. and Indian Armies 1666–1947. British Empire and Commonwealth Museum Research Paper No 1. ISBN 0-9530174-0-0.
- Moberly, Frederick James (1924). Military Operations: The Campaign in Mesopotamia. History of the Great War Based on Official Documents by Direction of the Historical Section of the Committee of Imperial Defence. Vol. II. London: HMSO.
- Moberly, Frederick James (1927). Military Operations: The Campaign in Mesopotamia. History of the Great War Based on Official Documents by Direction of the Historical Section of the Committee of Imperial Defence. Vol. IV. London: HMSO.
- Perry, F. W. (1993). Order of Battle of Divisions Part 5B. Indian Army Divisions. Newport: Ray Westlake Military Books. ISBN 1-871167-23-X.
