= 22nd Punjab Infantry =

22nd Punjab Infantry could refer to two regiments of the British Indian Army

- 22nd Punjabis in 1861
- 30th Punjabis in 1857
