= Beanland =

Beanland may refer to:

- Beanland Mine, gold mine in Canada
- Beanland (band), American rock band
- Beanland (surname)
