= 14th Punjab Regiment =

Former regiment of the armies of British India and Pakistan

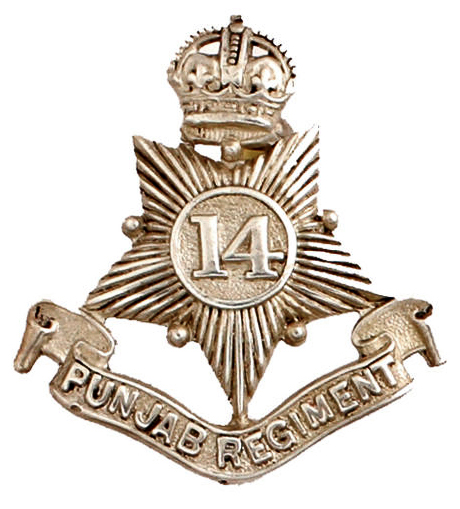
- Active: 1922 - 1956
- Country: (British Raj) British India 1922 - 47; Pakistan 1947 - 56
- Type: Infantry
- Regimental Centre: Ferozepur 1923; Jhelum 1946
- Uniform: Scarlet; faced green
- Engagements: Indian Mutiny 1857-58; Second Anglo-China War 1860-62; Assam 1862-63; Bhutan War 1864-66; Abyssinian Campaign 1867-68; Lushai Expedition 1871; Second Afghan War 1878-80; Anglo-Egyptian War 1882; Lushai Expedition 1890; The Boxer Rebellion 1900; Tibet 1903-04; First World War 1914-18; Third Afghan War 1919; Second World War 1939-45; Kashmir War 1948

Commanders
- Colonel of the Regiment: Brig Khalid Mukhtar Farani, SI(M), COAS CH
- Notable commanders: Field Marshal Sir Charles Henry Brownlow; General Sir Frederick Campbell; General Sir Brodie Haig; Field Marshal M Ayub Khan; Major-General Douglas Beanland Brigadier Khalid Mukhtar Farani, SI(M), COAS CH Present Col of the Battalion

The 14th Punjab Regiment was a regiment of the British Indian Army from 1922 to 1947. It was transferred to the Pakistan Army on independence in 1947, and amalgamated with the 1st, 15th and 16th Punjab Regiments in 1956, to form the Punjab Regiment.

== Early history ==
The 14th Punjab Regiment was formed in 1922 by amalgamation of the 19th, 20th, 21st, 22nd and 24th Punjabis, and the 40th Pathans. All six battalions were formed during the upheaval of the Indian Mutiny in 1857-58. The first five were raised by John Lawrence in the Punjab, while the 40th Pathans were raised as the Shahjehanpur Levy. The 20th and 22nd Punjabis served in China during the Second Opium War in 1860-62, while the 21st Punjabis participated in the Abyssinian Campaign of 1867-68. All battalions saw extensive service on the North West Frontier of India and took part in the Second Afghan War of 1878-80. The 20th Punjabis served in Egypt during the Anglo-Egyptian War of 1882. After the war, they were designated as the Duke of Cambridge's Own, when the duke became their honorary colonel. In 1900, they returned to China along with the 24th Punjabis to suppress the Boxer Rebellion. The 40th Pathans, who were for some time an exclusively Pathan unit, were sent to Tibet in 1904 as reinforcements for the Younghusband Expedition.

== First World War ==
During the First World War, the battalions of the 14th Punjab Regiment served in all the major theatres of war. The 19th Punjabis, while serving in Persia had the unique distinction of being actively engaged against the Bolsheviks in 1918 during the hard-fought actions at Merv, Kaka and Dushak in the Russian Turkestan. The 40th Pathans greatly distinguished themselves in the fighting against the Germans in France and German East Africa, while the rest of the battalions served in the Middle East.

- 19th Punjabis - India, Persia, Russia.
- 2/19th Punjabis - Raised in 1917. India, Egypt.
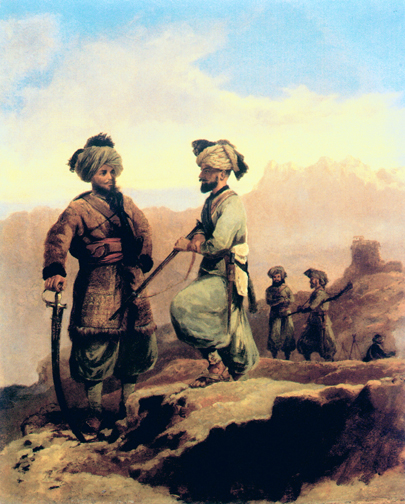
  20th (Punjab) Regiment of Bengal Native Infantry. Oil painting by Walter Fane, 1868.
- 20th Duke of Cambridge's Own Infantry (Brownlow's Punjabis) - Mesopotamia, Egypt, Palestine.
- 21st Punjabis - India, Egypt, Palestine, Russia.
- 2/21st Punjabis - Raised in 1917. India.
- 22nd Punjabis - India, Mesopotamia, Persia.
- 2/22nd Punjabis - Raised in 1917. India, Hong Kong.
- 24th Punjabis - India, Mesopotamia, Russia, Greece.
- 40th Pathans - Hong Kong, France, German East Africa, India.
- 2/40th Pathans - Raised in 1918. India.

All war-raised battalions were disbanded after the war. In 1919, the 22nd Punjabis and 40th Pathans took part in the Third Afghan War.

In 1921-22, a major reorganization was undertaken in the British Indian Army leading to the formation of large infantry groups of four to six battalions. Among these was the 14th Punjab Regiment. The line-up of battalions for the 14th Punjabis was:

- 1st Battalion - 19th Punjabis
- 2nd Battalion - 20th Duke of Cambridge's Own Infantry (Brownlow's Punjabis)
- 3rd Battalion - 22nd Punjabis
- 4th Battalion - 24th Punjabis
- 5th Battalion - 40th Pathans
- 10th (Training) Battalion - 21st Punjabis
- 11th (Territorial) Battalion - 1st (Territorial) Battalion 26th Punjabis.

The class composition of the new regiment was Pathans, Punjabi Muslims, Sikhs and Dogras. The new regimental badge was a five-pointed star denoting the five rivers of the Punjab, with the number "14" in the center, surmounted by a crown with a scroll below, which read "Punjab Regiment". The uniform of the 14th Punjab Regiment was scarlet with green facings. Ferozepur in the Punjab was chosen as the permanent station for the Training Battalion. In 1923 the 1st Battalion was among the first Indian Army units selected for Indianisation of its officer corps.

== Second World War ==
During the Second World War, the 14th Punjab Regiment raised nine new battalions. Most of them were engaged in the bitter fighting against the Japanese in the Far East. The regiment had the misfortune of having four of its battalions being captured by the Japanese at Singapore and Hong Kong.

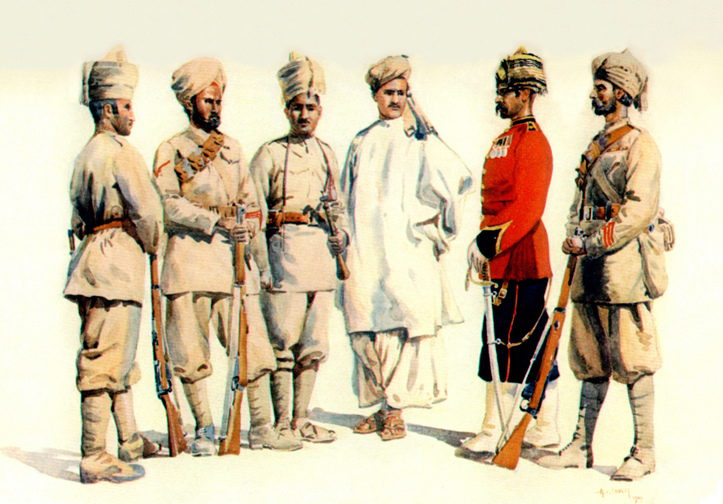
19th Punjabis. Left to Right: Afridi, Sikh, Bangash, Swati, Yusufzai, Punjabi Muslim. Watercolour by AC Lovett, 1910.

- 1st Battalion - Malaya. Captured at Singapore in February 1942. Re-raised 1946.
- 2nd Battalion - Hong Kong. Captured in December 1941. Re-raised 1946.
- 3rd Battalion - North Africa, Aden, Italian East Africa, Burma.
- 4th Battalion - Burma, Siam.
- 5th Battalion - Malaya. Captured at Singapore in February 1942. Re-raised 1952.
- 6th Battalion - Raised in 1940. Singapore. Captured in February 1942.
- 7th Battalion - Raised in 1941. Burma. Disbanded 1946.
- 8th Battalion - Raised in 1941. India. Re-designated as 2/14th Punjab in 1946.
- 9th Battalion - Raised in 1941. Ceylon, Burma, French Indochina, Sarawak. Disbanded 1947.
- 10th (Training) Battalion - Converted into the 14th Punjab Regimental Training Centre in 1943.
- 11th (Territorial) Battalion - Mobilized in 1939. Transferred to the 9th Jat Regiment, becoming the 9/9th Jat in 1941.
- 12th (Territorial) Battalion - Raised in 1939. Transferred to the 9th Jat Regiment, becoming the 14/9th Jat in 1941.
- 14th Battalion - Raised in 1942. India. Disbanded 1945.
- 15th Battalion - Re-designation of the Machine Gun Battalion. Converted into a training unit in 1942. India. Disbanded 1946.
- 16th Battalion - Raised as the 25th Garrison Battalion in 1942. On conversion to active status, served in India. Disbanded 1944.
- 25th Garrison Battalion - Raised in 1942. On conversion to active status, became the 16th Battalion. India.
- 26th Garrison Battalion - Raised in 1942. Converted to active status in January 1945 but not renumbered. India, Cocos Islands. Disbanded 1945.
- Machine-Gun Battalion - Raised in January 1942. Redesignated as 15/14th Punjab in July 1942. India.

== Post-independence history ==
On the independence in 1947, the 14th Punjab Regiment was allotted to Pakistan Army. At the time, the active battalions were 1st, 2nd, 3rd and 4th. Jats, Jatsikhs, and Dogras were transferred to the Indian Army and the regiment's new class composition was fixed as Punjabis and Pathans. The 5th Battalion (Pathans) was re-raised in 1952. In 1948, the 2nd and 4th Battalions fought in the war with India in Kashmir.

In 1956, a major reorganization was undertaken in the Pakistan Army and larger infantry groups were created by amalgamating the existing infantry regiments. As a result, the 14th Punjab Regiment was amalgamated with the 1st, 15th and 16th Punjab Regiments to form one large Punjab Regiment. The four regimental centres were also merged and the combined centre moved to Mardan. The line-up of the new regiment was:

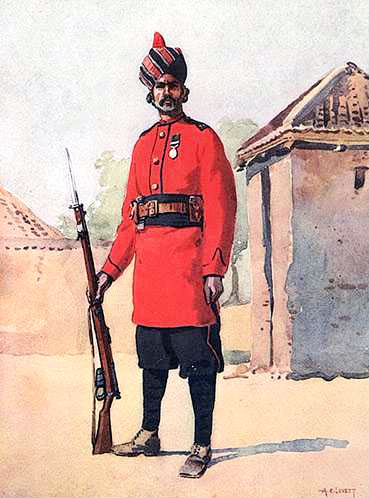
Sepoy 22nd Punjabis. Watercolour by Major AC Lovett, 1910.

- 1 Punjab - 1/1st Punjab
- 2 Punjab - 2/1st Punjab
- 3 Punjab - 3/1st Punjab
- 4 Punjab - 5/1st Punjab
- 5 Punjab - 1/14th Punjab
- 6 Punjab - 2/14th Punjab (Duke of Cambridge's Own)
- 7 Punjab - 3/14th Punjab
- 8 Punjab - 4/14th Punjab
- 9 Punjab - 1/15th Punjab
- 10 Punjab - 2/15th Punjab
- 11 Punjab - 3/15th Punjab
- 12 Punjab - 4/15th Punjab
- 13 Punjab - 1/16th Punjab
- 14 Punjab - 2/16th Punjab
- 15 Punjab - 3/16th Punjab
- 16 Punjab - 5/14th Punjab (Pathans)
- 17 Punjab - 4/16th Punjab (Bhopal)
- 18 Punjab - 7/1st Punjab
- 19 Punjab - 7/16th Punjab
- 20 Punjab - 14/1st Punjab

== Battle honours ==
Taku Forts, Pekin 1860, China 1860-62, Abyssinia, Ali Masjid, Ahmad Khel, Kandahar 1880, Afghanistan 1878-80, Tel-el-Kebir, Egypt 1882, Malakand, Punjab Frontier, Pekin 1900, China 1900, Ypres 1915, St Julien, Aubers, France and Flanders 1915, Macedonia 1918, Suez Canal, Egypt 1915, Megiddo, Sharon, Nablus, Palestine 1918, Basra, Shaiba, Kut al Amara 1915, Ctesiphon, Defence of Kut al Amara, Kut al Amara 1917, Baghdad, Khan Baghdadi, Mesopotamia 1914-18, Merv, Persia 1915-19, NW Frontier, India 1915, ’17, Narungombe, East Africa 1916-18, Afghanistan 1919, Agordat, Keren, Wolchefit, Abyssinia 1940-41, Defence of Alamein Line, Alam el Halfa, North Africa 1940-43, Jitra, Kampar, Singapore Island, Malaya 1941-42, Hong Kong, South East Asia 1941-42, The Yu, North Arakan, Buthidaung, Razabil, Maungdaw, Ngakyedauk Pass, Imphal, Shenam Pass, Nungshigum, Bishenpur, Kanglatongbi, Kohima, Jessami, Naga Village, Mao Songsang, Monywa 1945, Kyaukse 1945, Nyaungu Bridgehead, Letse, Magwe, Rangoon Road, Pegu 1945, Sittang 1945, Burma 1942-45, Kashmir 1948.

== See also ==
- Punjab Regiment
