= Beanland (surname) =

Beanland is a surname. Notable people with the surname include:

- Denver Beanland (born 1945), Australian state politician
- Douglas Beanland (1893–1963), British Indian Army officer
- Harriette Beanland (1866–1922), British textile worker and suffragette
- John Beanland (1866–1943), New Zealand politician
- Rachel Beanland, American author of Florence Adler Swims Forever
- Robin Beanland, British video game music composer
- Tony Beanland (born 1944), English footballer

== See also ==
- Bernard Beanlands (1897–1919), Canadian World War I flying ace
- Rachelle Beanlands (born 1993), Canadian soccer player
