= Warfield Hall =

Country house in Warfield, Berkshire, England

Coordinates: 51.4399°N 0.7539°W

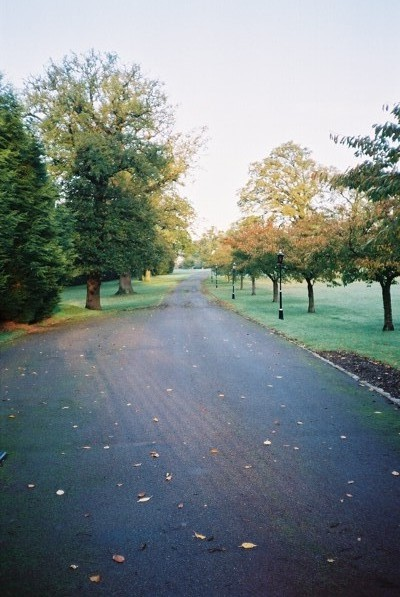
The entrance to Warfield Hall

Warfield Hall is a Grade II listed building at Warfield in Berkshire.

== History ==
Warfield Hall was originally built in the 1730s and belonged to the Hart, later the Hart-Cotton, family. It passed by marriage to the Parry family of Denbighshire and passed down in that family until sold in 1831 to General Sir John Malcolm on his return from India. He described it as "a large three-storey mansion, built in the 1730s, with ten bedrooms, stabling, a paddock, an orangery, a well-wooded park with a two-acre lake, a fine garden with a terrace, kitchen garden and outhouses". Malcolm died shortly afterwards and the property was bought by William Charles King.

The house was substantially altered or rebuilt in the 1840s and, following a serious fire, was rebuilt in the 1870s by William King. In 1890 King's daughter, Georgina, married Field Marshal Sir Charles Brownlow who moved into the house. The house was extended in the late 19th century and altered again in the early 20th century. In 1939 the house was acquired by Sir Thomas Sopwith who used it as his home until the house was sold at auction in 1952.

In the early 1970's the house was bought by American Broadway Producer and polo player Michael Butler.

In the mid 1970s the house was used as the American Military HQ in the film The Eagle Has Landed.

It is now the property of Sheik Ali Juffali, a director of E. A. Juffali and Brothers.
