= 21st Punjabis =

- Active: 1857 - 1922
- Country: British India
- Branch: Army
- Type: Infantry
- Size: 2 Battalions
- Uniform: Drab; faced scarlet
- Engagements: Indian Mutiny 1857-58; Abyssinian Campaign 1867-68; Second Afghan War 1878-80; First World War

Commanders
- Colonel of the Regiment: Major-General Sir Vere Bonamy Fane

The 21st Punjabis were an infantry regiment of the British Indian Army. It was raised in 1857, as the 11th Regiment of Punjab Infantry. It was designated as the 21st Punjabis in 1903 and became 10th (Training) Battalion of 14th Punjab Regiment in 1922. In 1943, it was converted into the 14th Punjab Regimental Centre. In 1947, the 14th Punjab Regiment was allocated to the Pakistan Army. In 1956, the 1st, 14th, 15th and 16th Punjab Regimental Centres were amalgamated to form the Punjab Regimental Centre.

== Early history ==
The regiment was raised in 1857, during the upheaval of the Indian Mutiny, as the 9th Regiment of Punjab Infantry from the men of the 3rd and 6th Punjab Infantry. The regiment took part in the Abyssinian Campaign of 1867-68 and the Second Afghan War of 1878-80. In June 1902 they were posted to the garrison in Tianjin, in China.

== Uniform ==
The officer's service dress consisted of a jacket with turned collar and shoulder straps. Over knickerbockers hung a long khaki shirt, and other Indian ranks wore a kurta. They wore regimental buttons, shoulder straps, badges and stripes. The infantry in the Indian army pre-1914 wore a bandolier, and a brown leather belt reminiscent of the British Army pre-1908 webbing issue. They carried a Lee Enfield rifle and short bayonet.

As part of the Punjab Frontier Force the drab army full-dress was with scarlet facings. The officers also wore but with hussar tunics, cording, pouch-belts, a silver whistle, chain, and badge with regulation white topes. The soldiers wound up puggarees as standard dress. The regiment recruited both Hindus and Moslems which was said to work well under British officers. Half a company would include Dogras, Sikhs, Punjabi Mussulmans, and Pathans, the latter half consisting of Yusufzais, Orukzais, and Afridis. There were eight companies post-1857, including a total of four platoons.

The Pathans on the Afghani border were occasionally unruly, and sought to escape service to serve enemies. While Afridis were solicited for recruitment in Great War by the German-sponsored rebels seeking to overthrow the government.

== 21st Punjabis ==
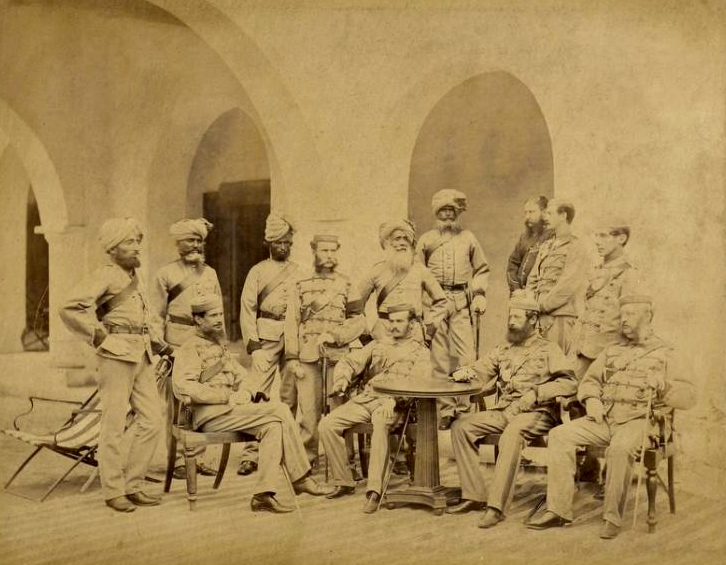
Group photograph of 21st (Punjab) Regiment of Bengal Native Infantry, 1866.

Subsequent to the reforms brought about in the Indian Army by Lord Kitchener in 1903, the regiment's designation was changed to 21st Punjabis. During the First World War, the regiment served in Egypt and Palestine. In 1918, it took part in the Battle of Megiddo, which led to the annihilation of Turkish Army in Palestine. In 1917, the 21st Punjabis raised a second battalion, which was disbanded after the war.

== Subsequent History ==
After the First World War, the 21st Punjabis were grouped with the 19th, 20th, 22nd and 24th Punjabis, and the 40th Pathans to form the 14th Punjab Regiment in 1922. The battalion was redesignated as 10th (Training) Battalion of the 14th Punjab Regiment, based at Ferozepur. During the Second World War, 10/14th Punjab was converted into the 14th Punjab Regimental Centre. In 1947, the 14th Punjab Regiment was allocated to Pakistan Army, and in 1956, it was merged with the 1st, 15th and 16th Punjab Regiments to form the Punjab Regiment. The 14th Punjab Regimental Centre was merged with the 1st, 15th and 16th Punjab Regimental Centres to form the Punjab Regimental Centre. It is based at Mardan.

== Genealogy ==
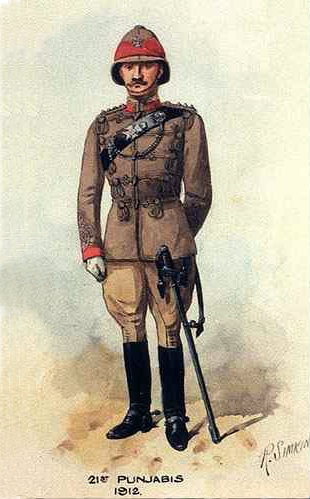
Officer of 21st Punjabis. Watercolour by Richard Simkin, 1912.

- 1857 9th Regiment of Punjab Infantry
- 1861 25th Regiment of Bengal Native Infantry
- 1861 21st Regiment of Bengal Native Infantry
- 1864 21st (Punjab) Regiment of Bengal Native Infantry
- 1885 21st (Punjab) Regiment of Bengal Infantry
- 1901 21st Punjab Infantry
- 1903 21st Punjabis
- 1917 1st Battalion 21st Punjabis
- 1921 21st Punjabis
- 1922 10th (Training) Battalion 14th Punjab Regiment
- 1943 14th Punjab Regimental Centre
- 1956 Punjab Regimental Centre

== See also ==
- 14th Punjab Regiment
- Punjab Regiment
