= 20th Duke of Cambridge's Own Infantry (Brownlow's Punjabis) =

Infantry regiment of the former British Indian Army

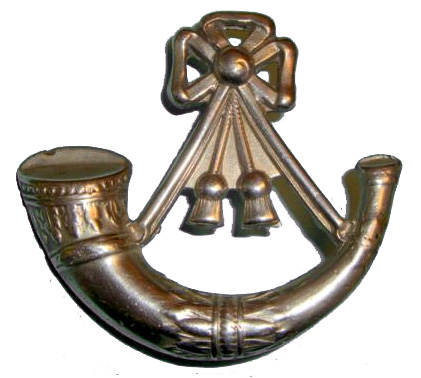
- Active: 1857 - till date
- Country: British India
- Branch: Army
- Type: Mechanised Infantry Battalion
- Size: 1 Battalion
- Garrison/HQ: Bahawalpur
- Motto: Quaid's Guard
- Uniform: Drab; faced green
- Engagements: Indian Mutiny 1857-58; Second Anglo-China War 1860-62; Second Afghan War 1878-80; Anglo-Egyptian War 1882; The Boxer Rebellion 1900; First World War 1914-18

Commanders
- Current commander: Lt.Col Waqas Ahmed
- Colonel-in-Chief: The Duke of Cambridge
- Colonel of the Regiment: Maj Gen Haroon Hameed Chaudhry

The 20th Duke of Cambridge's Own Infantry (Brownlow's Punjabis) was a regiment of the British Indian Army. It was raised in 1857, as the 8th Regiment of Punjab Infantry. It was designated as the 20th Duke of Cambridge's Own Infantry (Brownlow's Punjabis) in 1904 and became 2nd Battalion (Duke of Cambridge's Own) 14th Punjab Regiment in 1922. In 1947, it was allocated to the Pakistan Army, where it continues to exist as 6th Battalion The Punjab Regiment.

== History ==
=== Early history ===
The regiment was raised at Nowshera on 1 August 1857 by Lieutenant Charles Henry Brownlow from drafts provided by 4th and 5th Punjab Infantry on the orders of John Lawrence, the British High Commissioner of the Punjab. It was one of several battalions raised by Lawrence to suppress the Great Indian Mutiny of 1857. Brownlow, who became their first commanding officer, remained associated with the regiment for more than half a century; becoming their Honorary Colonel in 1904. He was made a Field Marshal in 1908. The seven companies of the regiment comprised five companies of Punjabi Musalmans and two companies of Jatt Sikhs. The regiment mainly recruited Awans and Gakhars from Talagang, Pindigheb, Kallar Kahar and Khewra. The regiment's first overseas service came during the Second Opium War against China. Soon after landing there, it took part in the successful assault on Taku Forts on 21 August 1860. The regiment then advanced with the rest of the British force, arriving at Peking (Beijing) in late September, which was captured on 6 October. In 1861, the regiment was brought into the line as the 24th Regiment of Bengal Native Infantry, replacing the previous 24th which had mutinied in 1857. It was renumbered as the 20th Regiment later in the year.

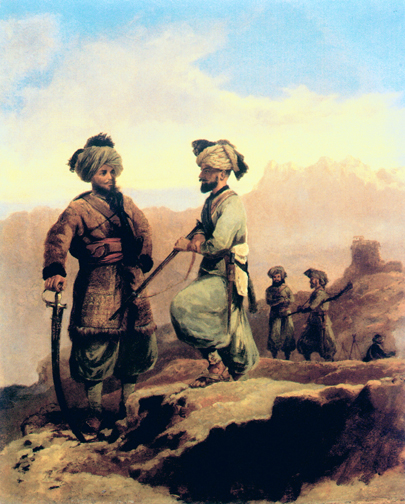
20th (Punjab) Regiment of Bengal Native Infantry. Oil painting by Walter Fane, 1868.

In 1863, it took part in the Umbeyla Campaign on the North-West Frontier of India. During the fierce fighting at Crag Picquet in October and November, the 20th Punjabis retook the position, which had been captured by the tribesemen on 30 October. It then successfully defended the post from repeated attacks by the tribal forces. It was the first of many such engagements against the hostile Pashtun tribes of the Afghan frontier. In 1864, the regiment, now designated as the 20th (Punjab) Regiment of Bengal Native Infantry, took part in the Black Mountain Expedition, and in 1877, it operated against the Jowaki Afridis. Next year, the regiment advanced into the Khyber Pass to clear Afghan forces at Ali Masjid during the Second Afghan War, as part of the 1st Brigade of the Peshawar Field Force. Ali Masjid, an imposing fortress, was the first engagement of the war. After the capture of the fort, the Peshawar Field Force advanced into Afghanistan and captured Jalalabad.

In 1882, the regiment was dispatched to Egypt as part of an expeditionary force to suppress the revolt by Arabi Pasha against the Egyptian Government. In a surprise dawn attack on 13 September, the Egyptian forces at Tel-el-Kebir were completely routed by the British. The 20th Punjabis fought on the left flank of the Indian Brigade. In honour of their service in Egypt, the Duke of Cambridge was appointed as their honorary colonel in 1883, and the regiment was retitled as the 20th (Duke of Cambridge's Own) (Punjab) Regiment of Bengal Native Infantry.

In 1891, after the Mir of Hunza refused to guarantee safe British passage through his state, the 20th Punjabis participated in Colonel Algernon Durand's expedition to Hunza. In 1897, during a general uprising of Pashtun tribes, the regiment operated as part of the Mohmand Field Force. The regiment, under the command by Lieutenant-Colonel (later Lieutenant-General) JB Woon, fought in a fierce engagement against a force of about 6,000 Mohmands at Shabkadr. In 1900, the 20th Punjabis were sent to China to suppress the Boxer Rebellion.

=== 20th Duke of Cambridge's Own Infantry (Brownlow's Punjabis) ===
Subsequent to the reforms brought about in the Indian Army by Lord Kitchener, the regiment's designation was changed to 20th Duke of Cambridge's Own Punjabis in 1903, and then 20th Duke of Cambridge's Own Infantry (Brownlow's Punjabis) in 1904.

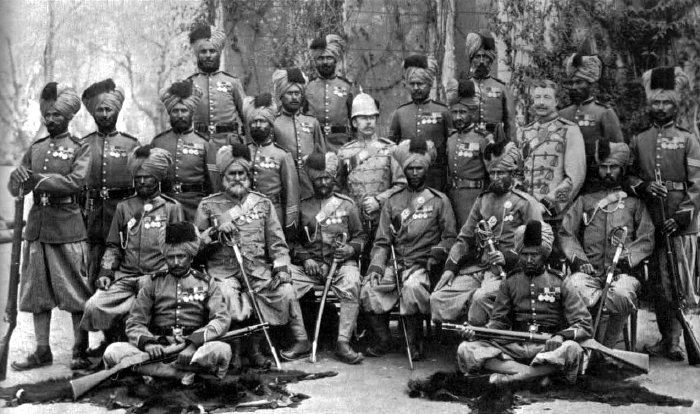
20th (Punjab) Regiment of Bengal Native Infantry, Egypt 1882.

During the First World War, the regiment saw active service in Mesopotamia and Palestine against the Ottoman Empire. On 16 October 1914, the 20th Punjabis sailed for the Persian Gulf from Bombay as part of the 16th (Poona) Brigade of the Indian Expeditionary Force 'D'. On 6 November, the regiment landed near the fort of Fao, and then advanced up the Shatt-al-Arab. On 11 November, the regiment was actively involved in repulsing a Turkish attack near Sanniyeh. The regiment then took part in the successful attack on the Ottoman force at Saihan on 15 November, and Zain on 19 November. After the Turks retreated northwards, the regiment took part in the capture of Basra, which was occupied on 23 November. In April 1915, the regiment fought at the Battle of Shaiba, where the Turkish attempt to retake Basra was foiled. The 20th Punjabis subsequently took part in the British advance northwards, which led to the capture of Kut-al-Amara in September 1915. For the next two years, the regiment remained engaged in a number of actions against the Turks including the Battle of Istabulat. After spending a few months in Egypt, it was dispatched to Palestine in March 1918 and took over trenches north of Jaffa. In May 1918, it returned to India.

=== Subsequent history ===
In 1921-22, a major reorganization was undertaken in the British Indian Army leading to the formation of large infantry groups of four to six battalions. Among these was the 14th Punjab Regiment, formed by grouping the 20th Punjabis with the 19th, 21st, 22nd and 24th Punjabis, and the 40th Pathans. The battalion's new designation was 2nd Battalion (Duke of Cambridge's Own) 14th Punjab Regiment. During the Second World War, the battalion was part of the British garrison of Hong Kong, where it fiercely resisted the Japanese invasion in December 1941. However, after heroically resisting the enemy for 18 days, the outnumbered British garrison was forced to surrender on 25 December. The battalion spent the rest of the war in Japanese captivity. It was re-raised in 1946. In 1947, the 14th Punjab Regiment was allocated to Pakistan Army. In 1956, it was merged with the 1st, 15th and 16th Punjab Regiments to form one large Punjab Regiment, and 2/14th Punjab was redesignated as 6 Punjab. In 1948, the battalion fought in the war with India in Kashmir, while during the 1965 Indo-Pakistan War, it served in the Rann of Kutch, and then took part in Operation Grand Slam. In 1971, it fought in East Pakistan.

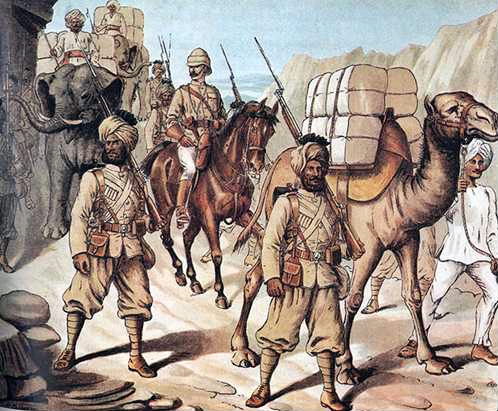
20th (Duke of Cambridge's Own) (Punjab) Regiment of Bengal Infantry on the march. Coloured lithograph by Richard Simkin, c. 1888.

== Lineage ==
- 1857: 8th Regiment of Punjab Infantry
- 1861: 24th Regiment of Bengal Native Infantry
- 1861: 20th Regiment of Bengal Native Infantry
- 1864: 20th (Punjab) Regiment of Bengal Native Infantry
- 1883: 20th (Duke of Cambridge's Own) (Punjab) Regiment of Bengal Native Infantry
- 1885: 20th (Duke of Cambridge's Own) (Punjab) Regiment of Bengal Infantry
- 1901: 20th Duke of Cambridge's Own Punjab Infantry
- 1903: 20th Duke of Cambridge's Own Punjabis
- 1904: 20th Duke of Cambridge's Own Infantry (Brownlow's Punjabis)
- 1922: 2nd Battalion (Duke of Cambridge's Own) 14th Punjab Regiment
- 1956: 6th Battalion The Punjab Regiment

== See also ==
- 14th Punjab Regiment
- Punjab Regiment
