= Henry Buckley Burton Watkis =

Indian general (1860–1931)

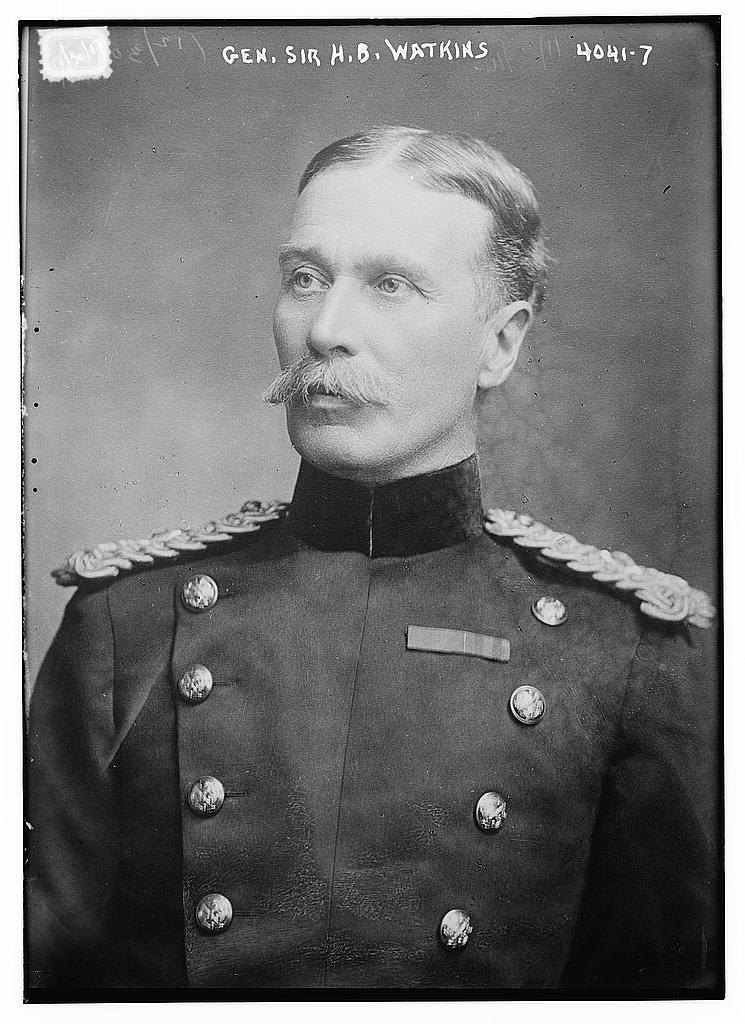

General Sir Henry Buckley Burton Watkis KCB (4 June 1860 – 5 May 1931) was a general in the Indian Army.

== Military career ==
Watkis was commissioned into the British Army as a second lieutenant on 11 May 1878, promoted to lieutenant on 2 June 1880 and transferred to the Indian Army in 1881. He became a captain on 11 May 1889. He was a deputy assistant adjutant general (DAAG) to the Indian Army headquartered in Simla, from October 1895 to early 1900, during which time he served on the North West Frontier of India as DAAG to the 1st Brigade Tochi Field Force in 1897. He was promoted to major on 11 May 1898, and to the substantive rank of lieutenant-colonel a week later on 20 May 1898.

In October 1907, and by now a major general, he was given command of a brigade then, in 1912, command of the 3rd (Lahore) Division. In May 1914 he was promoted to lieutenant general and took his division to France as part of the Indian Expeditionary Force. He was made a KCB in June 1915 and became a general in 1917.
