= 24th Punjabis =

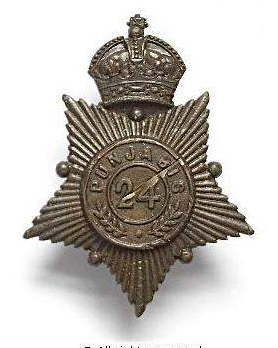
- Active: 1857 - 1922
- Country: British India
- Branch: British Indian Army
- Type: Infantry
- Size: 1 Battalion
- Uniform: Red; faced white
- Engagements: Indian Mutiny 1857-58; Second Afghan War 1878-80; Boxer Rebellion 1900; First World War 1914-18; Third Afghan War 1919

The 24th Punjabis were an infantry regiment of the British Indian Army. It was raised in 1857, as the 11th Regiment of Punjab Infantry. It was designated as the 24th Punjabis in 1861 and became 4th Battalion 14th Punjab Regiment in 1922. In 1947, it was allocated to the Pakistan Army, where it continues to exist as 8th Battalion (CRACKS) The Punjab Regiment.

== Early history ==
The regiment was raised on 5 June 1857, at Peshawar by Capt G N Kave during the upheaval of the Indian Mutiny, as the 24th Punjab Native Infantry (For a short period of time the Regiment was designated as 16th PNI, which should not be confused with the 16th Punjab Group). The regiment participated in the Second Afghan War of 1878-80 and after taking part in Lord Roberts' 'Kabul to Kandahar' march, fought at the Battle of Kandahar on 1 September 1880. In 1897, during a general uprising of Pashtun tribes, the regiment was stationed at Malakand. In July, the garrison was attacked by hostile tribesmen, who were repulsed after a fierce engagement. Lieutenant Edmund Costello was awarded the Victoria Cross for conspicuous gallantry during the action. In 1900, the regiment was sent to China to suppress the Boxer Rebellion.

== 24th Punjabis ==
Subsequent to the reforms brought about in the Indian Army by Lord Kitchener in 1903, the regiment's designation was changed to 24th Punjabis. During the First World War the regiment served in Egypt and then in Mesopotamia, where it fought the Battles of Shaiba, Ctesiphon and the Siege of Kut al Amara in 1915, where it was captured by the Turks. The 24th Punjabis returned to Mesopotamia in April 1917, after reforming, and fought in the Battle of Khan Baghdadi. They later served in Salonika and the Russian Transcaucasia.

== Subsequent history ==
In 1921–22, a major reorganization was undertaken in the British Indian Army, leading to the formation of large infantry groups of four to six battalions. Among these was the 14th Punjab Regiment, formed by grouping the 24th Punjabis with the 19th, 20th, 21st and 22nd Punjabis, and the 40th Pathans. The battalion's new designation was 4th Battalion 14th Punjab Regiment. During the Second World War, the battalion fought in the Burma Campaign. In 1947, the 14th Punjab Regiment was allocated to Pakistan Army. In 1956, it was merged with the 1st, 15th and 16th Punjab Regiments to form one large Punjab Regiment, and 4/14th Punjab was redesignated as 8 Punjab. In 1948, the battalion fought in the war with India in Kashmir, while during the 1965 Indo-Pakistan War, it served in Lahore and Chhamb Sectors. In 1971, it fought in East Pakistan.

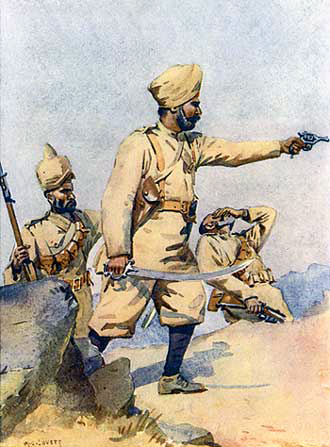
24th Punjabis . Watercolour by Major AC Lovett, 1910.

Badge of the 24th Punjabis

== Genealogy ==
- Raised from 24th, 27th, 51st and 64th Regiments Native Infantry at Peshawar
- 5 Jun 1857 24th Punjab Infantry
- 5 Aug 1857 16th Regiment of Punjab Infantry
- 1861 28th Regiment Native Infantry
- 1861 24th (Punjab) Native Infantry
- 1903 24 Punjabis
- 1922 4th Battalion 14th Punjab Regiment
- 1956 8th Battalion The Punjab Regiment

== Prominent general officers ==
- Maj Gen Muhammad Mushtaq (DG Military Intelligence, GOC 11th Division, DG Rangers Sindh, GOC 21st Division)
- Gen Muhammad Sharif (Late), Jiont Chief of Staff Committee
- Maj Gen Muhammad Arshad Ch (late)
- Lt Gen Syed Ather Ali, Comd 5 Corps, Def Secy
- Lt Gen Khalid Rabbani, Comd 11 Corps, Chairman AWT
- Lt Gen Khalid Zia, Comd 31 Corps
- Maj Gen Mumtaz Hussain, GOC 7 Div

== See also ==
- 14th Punjab Regiment
- Punjab Regiment
