= 47th Duke of Connaught's Own Sikhs =

British Indian military unit

47th Sikhs
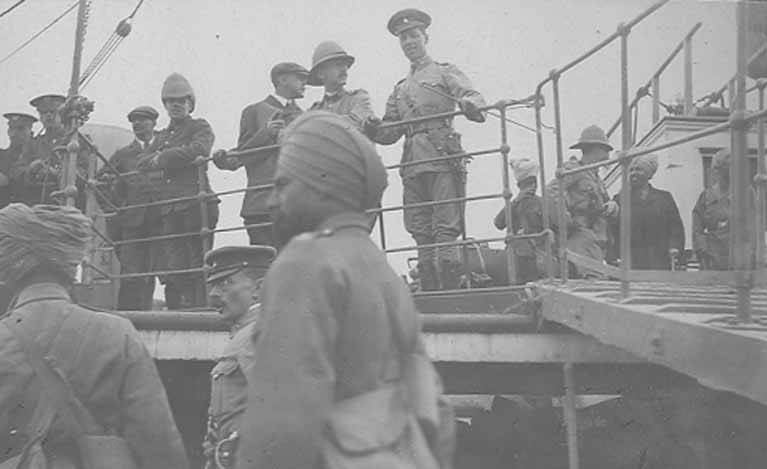
- 47th Sikhs prepare to depart from Tianjin, China, 1908.
- Active: 1901-1922
- Country: Indian Empire
- Branch: Army
- Type: Infantry
- Part of: Bengal Army (to 1895); Bengal Command
- Colors: Scarlet; faced yellow

The 47th Sikhs were an infantry regiment of the British Indian Army. They could trace their origins to 1901, when they were raised as the 47th (Sikh) Bengal Infantry.

After World War I, the Indian government reformed the army moving from single battalion regiments to multi battalion regiments. In 1922, the 47th Sikhs now became the 5th Battalion, 11th Sikh Regiment. The regiment was allocated to the new India on independence.

== Sources ==
- Barthorp, Michael; Burn, Jeffrey (1979). Indian infantry regiments 1860-1914. Osprey Publishing. ISBN 0-85045-307-0.
- Sumner, Ian (2001). The Indian Army 1914-1947. Osprey Publishing. ISBN 1-84176-196-6.
