= Douglas Beanland =

British Army general (1893–1963)

- Beanland in 1947
- Born: 4 March 1893
- Died: 9 April 1963 (aged 70)
- Allegiance: United Kingdom
- Branch: (British Raj) British Indian Army
- Service years: 1913–1947
- Rank: Major-General
- Commands: 10th Battalion, 14th Punjab Regiment; 106 Lines of Communication Area
- Conflicts: First World War; Second World War
- Awards: Companion of the Order of the Indian Empire, Officer of the Order of the British Empire

Major-General Douglas Beanland CIE OBE (4 March 1893 – 9 April 1963) was a senior British Indian Army officer of the Second World War.

== Military career ==
Beanland commissioned from the Royal Military College, Sandhurst onto the unattached list for the Indian Army on 22 January 1913.

He arrived in India 6 March 1913 and was attached to the 3rd battalion Kings Royal Rifle Corps on 8 March 1913 however on the 22 October 1913 he was sent back to England on a medical certificate for up to 12 months. He joined the Indian army and the 22nd Punjabis on 13 October 1914. He served in Mesopotamia from 22 December 1914 to 24 April 1916. He was attached to the 51st Sikhs from 2 February 1916 to 24 April 1916, then he was posted back to the 22nd Punjabis on 25 April 1916.

He was attached to the 2nd battalion, 56th Punjabi Rifles on 16 June 1917 to 9 November 1918 and then he was appointed Adjutant and Quartermaster of Quetta cadet college from 10 November 1918 to 30 April 1919, followed by appointment to Quetta staff college as Adjutant and Quartermaster from 1 May 1919 to 10 February 1924. In 1922 the 22nd Punjabis were retitled 3rd battalion 14th Punjab Regiment and on 1 October 1925 he was appointed a company commander.

Appointed Deputy Assistant Adjutant & Quarter Master General on the staff of Burma Independent District 14 February 1931 to 13 February 1935. For his services during the Burma rebellion of 1930-32 he was appointed an Officer of the Order of the British Empire and mentioned in despatches.

Beanland was appointed second in command of the 3rd battalion 14th Punjab Regiment on 11 June 1934, then he was appointed to command the 10th battalion 14th Punjab Regiment from 25 January 1938 until 8 August 1940.

He then served as an Assistant Adjutant-General at Army Headquarters India from 9 August 1940 until 1942, before being appointed as Commanding Officer, 106 Lines of Communication Area until 1944. Between 1944 and 1945 he was Chief Administration Officer of the North Western Army. From October 1945 to his retirement on 20 October 1947 Beanland was Deputy Quartermaster-General of the Indian Army. He was invested as a Companion of the Order of the Indian Empire in January 1946 for his services during the Second World War.
