= 22nd Punjabis =

- Active: 1857 - 1922
- Country: British India
- Branch: Army
- Type: Infantry
- Size: 2 Battalions
- Uniform: Red; faced blue
- Engagements: Indian Mutiny 1857-58; Second Anglo-China War 1860-62; Lushai Expedition 1871; Second Afghan War 1878-80; First World War 1914-18; Third Afghan War 1919

The 22nd Punjabis was an infantry regiment of the British Indian Army. It was raised in 1857, as the 11th Regiment of Punjab Infantry. It was designated as the 22nd Punjabis in 1903 and became 3rd Battalion 14th Punjab Regiment in 1922. In 1947, it was allocated to the Pakistan Army, where it continues to exist as 7th Battalion The Punjab Regiment.

== Early history ==
The regiment was raised at Multan on 1 August 1857, during the upheaval of the Indian Mutiny, as the 11th Regiment of Punjab Infantry from the men of the 1st Sikh Infantry and the 3rd Punjab Police Battalion. The regiment took part in the Second Opium War in 1860, the Lushai Expedition of 1871 and the Second Afghan War of 1878-80.

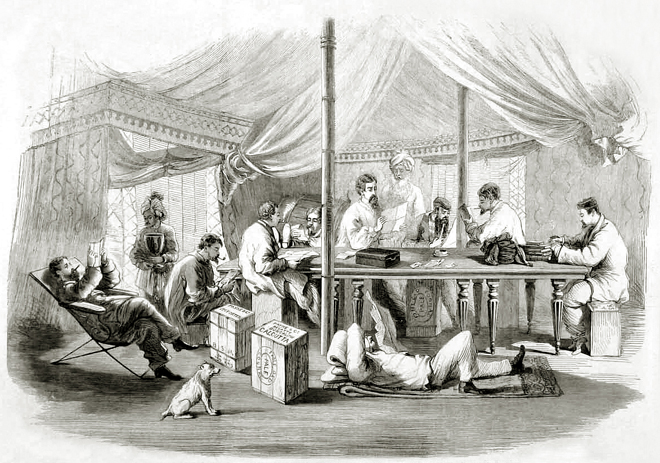
Officers of 11th Punjab Infantry in camp at Pehtang, China, 1860.

== 22nd Punjabis ==
Subsequent to the reforms brought about in the Indian Army by Lord Kitchener in 1903, the regiment's designation was changed to 22nd Punjabis. During the First World War, the regiment served in Mesopotamia Campaign. It fought in a number of actions including the Battle of Ctesiphon in 1915, where it suffered 396 casualties out of a strength of 814. In 1917, the 22nd Punjabis raised a 2nd battalion, which was disbanded after the war. In 1919, the regiment fought in the Third Afghan War.

== Subsequent history ==
In 1921-22, a major reorganization was undertaken in the British Indian Army leading to the formation of large infantry groups of four to six battalions. Among these was the 14th Punjab Regiment, formed by grouping the 22nd Punjabis with the 19th, 20th, 21st and 24th Punjabis, and the 40th Pathans. The battalion's new designation was 3rd Battalion 14th Punjab Regiment.

During the Second World War, the battalion fought in Eritrea, North Africa and Burma.

In 1947, the 14th Punjab Regiment was allocated to Pakistan Army. In 1956, it was merged with the 1st, 15th and 16th Punjab Regiments to form one large Punjab Regiment, and 3/14th Punjab was redesignated as 7 Punjab. During the 1965 Indo-Pakistan War, the battalion fought in Kasur Sector, while in 1971, it fought at Suleimanki.

== Genealogy ==
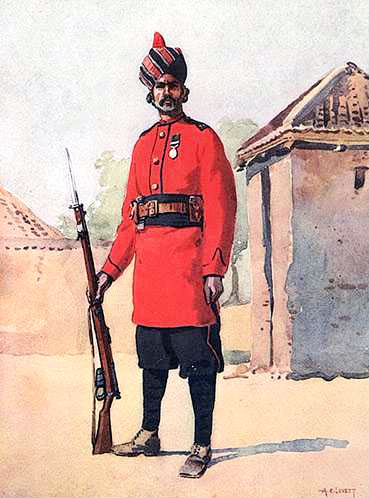
Sepoy 22nd Punjabis. Watercolour by Major AC Lovett, 1910.

- 1857 11th Regiment of Punjab Infantry
- 1861 26th Regiment of Bengal Native Infantry
- 1861 22nd Regiment of Bengal Native Infantry
- 1864 22nd (Punjab) Regiment of Bengal Native Infantry
- 1885 22nd (Punjab) Regiment of Bengal Infantry
- 1901 22nd Punjab Infantry
- 1903 22nd Punjabis
- 1917 1st Battalion 22nd Punjabis
- 1922 3rd Battalion 14th Punjab Regiment
- 1956 7th Battalion The Punjab Regiment

== See also ==
- 14th Punjab Regiment
- Punjab Regiment
