= 19th Punjabis =

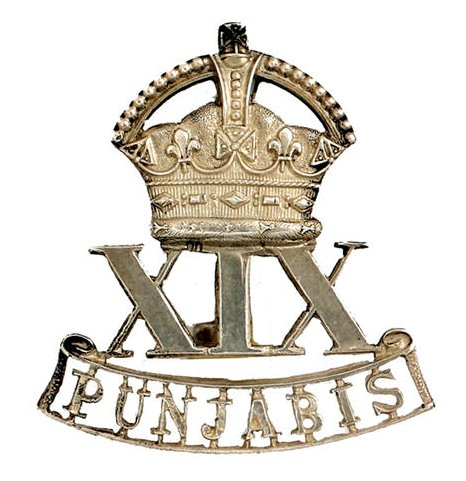
- Active: 1857 - 1922
- Country: British India
- Branch: British Indian Army
- Type: Infantry
- Size: 2 Battalions
- Nickname: Sherdil-ki-Paltan
- Uniform: Red; faced dark blue
- Engagements: Indian Mutiny 1857-58; Bhutan War 1864-66; Second Afghan War 1878-80; Tibet 1903-04; First World War 1914-18

Commanders
- Notable commanders: Field Marshal M Ayub Khan

The 19th Punjabis was an infantry regiment of the British Indian Army. It was raised in 1857, as the 7th Regiment of Punjab Infantry. It was designated as the 19th Punjabis in 1903 and became 1st Battalion 14th Punjab Regiment i.e. 1/14 Punjab Regiment in 1922. In 1947, it was allocated to the Pakistan Army, where it continues to exist as 5th Battalion The Punjab Regiment (5th Punjab).

== History ==
=== Early history ===
The regiment was formed during the upheaval of the Indian Mutiny in 1857 as the 7th Regiment of Punjab Infantry on the orders of John Lawrence, the British Chief Commissioner of the Punjab, and saw service in North India. In 1864, it participated in the Bhutan war, and during the Second Afghan War of 1878-80, the regiment fought with distinction in the Battle of Ahmed Khel. In 1891, it took part in the Black Hill Expedition and the 2nd Miranzai Expedition on the North West Frontier of India. In 1903, the 19th Punjab Infantry took part in the British expedition to Tibet.

=== 19th Punjabis ===
Subsequent to the reforms brought about in the Indian Army by Lord Kitchener in 1903, the regiment's designation was changed to the 19th Punjabis. On the outbreak of the First World War, it initially remained in India guarding the North West Frontier as part of the 4th (Quetta) Division. In February 1916, it moved to Persia, where it had the unique distinction of being actively engaged against the Bolsheviks in 1918 during the hard-fought actions at Merv, Kaka and Dushak in the Russian Turkestan. At Dushak, all of the British officers, and the Indian Subedar Major of the regiment, were either killed or wounded, and the battalion was led by a Subedar. In 1917, the 19th Punjabis raised a second battalion, which was disbanded after the war.

=== Subsequent history ===
In 1921-22, a major reorganization was undertaken in the British Indian Army leading to the formation of large infantry groups of four to six battalions. Among these was the 14th Punjab Regiment, formed by grouping the 19th Punjabis with the 20th, 21st, 22nd and 24th Punjabis, and the 40th Pathans. The battalion's new designation was 1st Battalion 14th Punjab Regiment. The battalion was often referred to by the British as the Battalion of Sherdil or Sherdil ki Paltan because of a Muslim Sepoy Sherdil known to hold some special spiritual powers and was found out by a British officer for offering prayers at one place and being on sentry duty at other at exactly the same time. During the Second World War, the battalion fought in the Malayan Campaign and was taken prisoner by the Japanese on Singapore Island following the British surrender on 15 February 1942. 90% of the officers and men of the battalion joined the Japanese Supported Indian National Army and fought against the British in the subsequent Battles. The battalion was re-raised in 1946. In 1947, the 14th Punjab Regiment was allocated to Pakistan Army. In 1956, it was merged with the 1st, 15th and 16th Punjab Regiments to form one large Punjab Regiment, and 1/14th Punjab was re designated as 5 Punjab Sherdils. During the 1965 Indo-Pakistan War, the battalion fought in Kashmir, while in 1971, it was deployed in a defensive role at Mandi Sadiq Ganj in the Punjab.

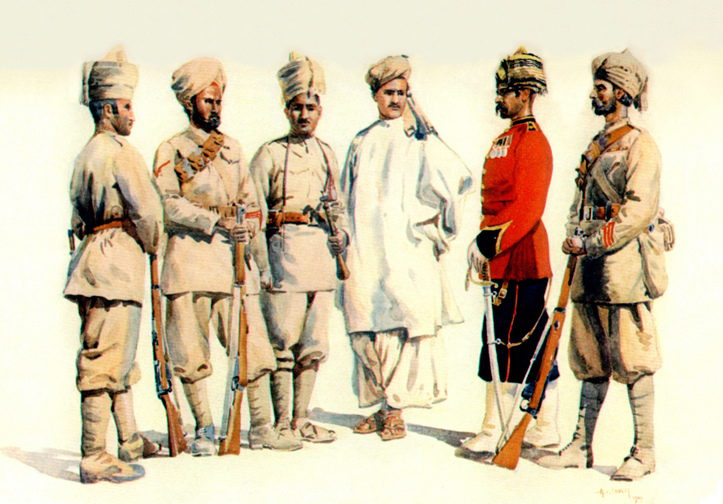
19th Punjabis. Left to Right: Afridi, Sikh, Bangash, Swati, Yusufzai, Punjabi Muslim. Watercolour by Major AC Lovett, 1910.

== Lineage ==
- 1857: 7th Regiment of Punjab Infantry
- 1861: 23rd Regiment of Bengal Native Infantry
- 1861: 19th Regiment of Bengal Native Infantry
- 1864: 19th (Punjab) Regiment of Bengal Native Infantry
- 1885: 19th (Punjab) Regiment of Bengal Infantry
- 1901: 19th Punjab Infantry
- 1903: 19th Punjabis
- 1916: 1st Battalion 19th Punjabis
- 1919: 19th Punjabis
- 1922: 1st Battalion 14th Punjab Regiment
- 1956: 5th Battalion The Punjab Regiment

== Notable former personnel ==
- Maj. Malik Munawar Khan Awan, Sitara e Jurat, Title: King of Rajauri, went over to the Japanese side and took command of the 2nd INA Guerrilla Battalion during the Battle of Imphal. Later he joined the Pakistan Army, where he was posted to the 21 AK Regiment and became Commander Ghaznavi Force, which infiltrated Mehndar-Rajauri Area during Operation Gibraltar 1965.
- Capt. Mohan Singh (general), defected to the Japanese side and later appointed C IN C of Indian National Army. He was later elected as a member of the Parliament of India.
- Capt. Shah Nawaz Khan (general), turned to Japanese Side, held command of Gandhi Brigade. Later elected as Indian MP.

== See also ==
- 14th Punjab Regiment
- Punjab Regiment
