= 40th Pathans =

40th Pathans (16 Punjab Regt)
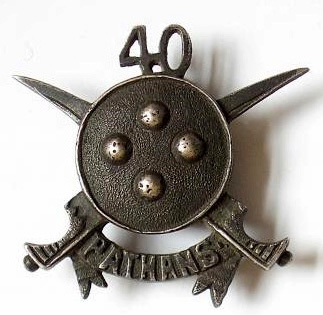
- Active: 1858 - present
- Country: (British Raj) British India (1922 - 47); Pakistan (1947 - present)
- Branch: British Indian Army; Pakistan Army
- Type: Infantry
- Motto: Gazian-e-Dograi
- Uniform: Red; faced green
- Engagements: Indian Mutiny 1857-58; Tibet 1903-04; First World War 1914-18; Third Afghan War 1919

Commanders
- Notable commanders: General Edward Dandridge; General Sir Frederick Campbell; Brig Sher Afghan; Lt. Col Azhar; Lt.Col Ashfaq Hassan; Lt.Col Muzafar

The 40th Pathans were an infantry regiment of the British Indian Army. It was raised in 1858 as the Shahjehanpur Levy. It was designated as the 40th Pathans in 1903 and became 5th Battalion (Pathans) 14th Punjab Regiment in 1922. In 1947, it was allocated to the Pakistan Army, where it continues to exist as 16th Battalion The Punjab Regiment.

== Early history ==
The regiment was raised in 1780 as Bengal Infantry and redesigned as Native Bengal Infantry in 1784. The regiment was disbanded in the 1857 war of Independence, being revoked again British. Later it was reraised by Lieutenant Edward Dandridge at Shahjahanpur in 1858, during the upheaval of the Indian Mutiny, as the Shahjahanpur Levy. It was initially composed of Hindus from North India and some Sikhs. In 1888, the regiment participated in the Black Mountain Expedition, while in 1890, it dispatched a detachment to Lushai Hills. In 1890, it was reconstituted with Trans-frontier Pathans to become the only all-Pathan regiment in the Indian Army; acquiring in the process, the nickname of "Forty Thieves". In 1901, it lost its exclusively Pathan character when two companies, one of Punjabi Muslims and Dogras were included.

== 40th Pathans ==
Subsequent to the reforms brought about in the Indian Army by Lord Kitchener in 1903, the regiment's designation was changed to 40th Pathans. In 1904, the 40th Pathans proceeded to Tibet as reinforcements for the Tibet Mission Force. On the outbreak of the First World War the regiment was stationed in Hong Kong. It arrived in France on 2 April 1915, and within days, was on the frontlines. The 40th Pathans fought with great gallantry in the Second Battle of Ypres, where they suffered 320 casualties on 26 April, and in the Battles of Aubers Ridge and Loos. In December, the regiment left for East Africa, where they served till February 1918, and again distinguished themselves in the long and bitter campaign. The 40th Pathans suffered a total of 800 casualties (killed or wounded) during the war, while 1066 officers and men were invalided out of service due to sickness. In 1919, the 40th Pathans participated in the Third Afghan War.

40th Pathans attacking German positions near Ypres, 26 April 1915. Illustration by AC Michael.

== British and Indian officers who died in World War I ==
European campaign

- Lt Col F. Rennick
- BT Lt Col A.G. Stuart
- Maj G.D. Campbell (while attached to Argyll and Sutherland Highlanders)
- Maj Ac.E.C. Perking
- Capt J.F.C. Dalmahoy
- Capt L.de.L Christopher
- 2nd Lt E.G. Hodgson
- Sub Jehandad Khan Bahadur
- Jemadar Lehar Khan
- Jemadar Saida Khan
- Jemadar Kaka Khan

East African campaign

- Maj H.A. Carter
- Maj E.C. Irwin
- Maj R.N. Maepherson
- 2nd Lt F.G. Gardiner
- 2nd Lt J.T.G. Humphreys
- 2nd Lt N.O. Burne
- Sub Gulodu
- Sub Mainu
- Jemadar Shiraz
- Jemadar Darjhodah
- Sub Major Habib Ullah Khan

== Pre-1947 partition ==
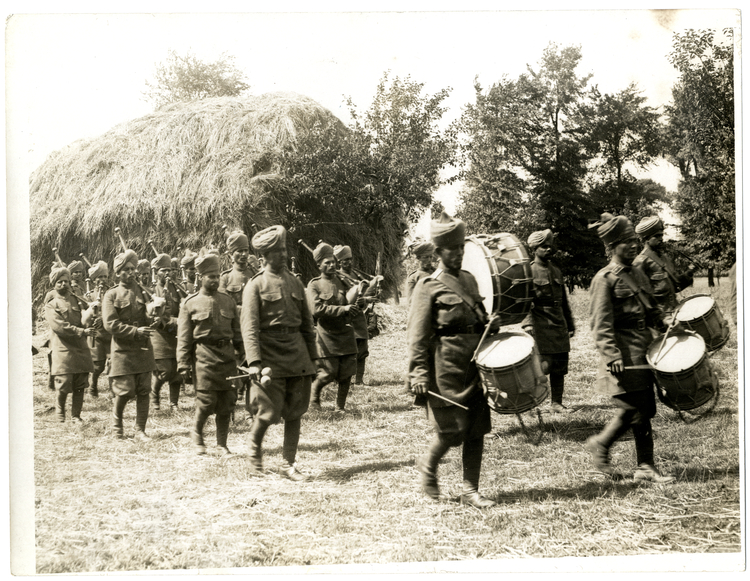
An infantry band from the 40th Pathans playing on a French farm in Saint-Floris.

In 1921-22, a major reorganization was undertaken in the British Indian Army leading to the formation of large infantry groups of four to six battalions. Among these was the 14th Punjab Regiment, formed by grouping the 40th Pathans with 19th, 20th, 21st, 22nd and 24th Punjabis. The battalion's new designation was 5th Battalion (Pathans) 14th Punjab Regiment. During the Second World War, the battalion fought in the Malayan Campaign and was taken prisoner by the Japanese on Singapore Island following the British surrender on 15 February 1942.

== Post-1947 partition ==
The battalion was re-raised in 1952. In the meantime, the 14th Punjab Regiment had been allocated to the Pakistan Army following the independence in 1947. In 1956, the 14th Punjab Regiment was merged with the 1st, 15th and 16th Punjab Regiments to form one large Punjab Regiment, and 5/14th Punjab was redesignated as 16 Punjab. During the 1965 and 1971 Indo-Pakistan Wars, the battalion fought on the Lahore Front.

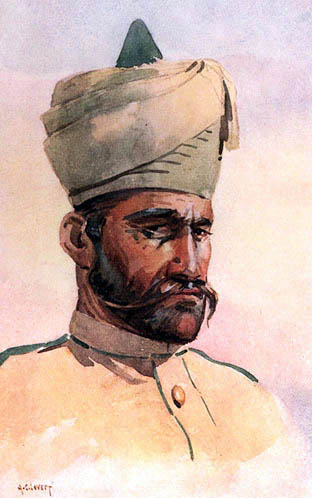
Sepoy 40th Pathans. Watercolour by Major AC Lovett, 1910.

== Genealogy ==
- 1780 Raised as Bengal Native Infantry
- 1858 Shahjahanpur Levy
- 1861 44th Regiment of Bengal Native Infantry
- 1861 40th Regiment of Bengal Native Infantry
- 1864 40th (Shahjahanpur) Regiment of Bengal Native Infantry
- 1885 40th Regiment of Bengal Infantry
- 1890 40th (Baluch) Regiment of Bengal Infantry
- 1892 40th (Pathan) Regiment of Bengal Infantry
- 1901 40th Punjab Infantry
- 1903 40th Pathans
- 1922 5th Battalion 14th Punjab Regiment
- 1934 5th Battalion (Pathans) 14th Punjab Regiment
- 1942 Captured by the Japanese at Singapore
- 1952 Re-raised
- 1956 16th Battalion The Punjab Regiment

== See also ==
- 14th Punjab Regiment
- Punjab Regiment
