= Florence Adler Swims Forever =

2020 novel by Rachel Beanland

- Cover of first edition
- Author: Rachel Beanland
- Audio read by: Rachel Beanland; Jonathan Davis; Tim Paige; Carly Robins; Jonathan Todd Ross; Tara Sands; Jesse Vilinsky; Gabra Zackman
- Cover artist: Lisa Golightly (illustration); Jackie Seow (design)
- Language: English
- Set in: Atlantic City, New Jersey in 1934
- Publisher: Simon & Schuster
- Publication date: July 7, 2020
- Publication place: United States
- Media type: Print (hardback), ebook, audiobook
- Pages: 320 pages
- ISBN: 978-1-982132-46-0 First edition hardback
- OCLC: 1124282271
- Dewey Decimal: 813/.6
- LC Class: PS3602.E2474 F56 2020

Florence Adler Swims Forever is the debut novel of American author Rachel Beanland. It was first published in the United States on July 7, 2020, through Simon & Schuster and centers upon a family living in Atlantic City during the 1930s.

== Synopsis ==
Esther and Joseph Adler own a bakery, above which is an apartment they lived in while they raised their two daughters. While they now have a house, they still return to the apartment each summer so they can make extra money by renting out their home to vacationers eager to visit Atlantic City. The apartment grows cramped after their daughters, college girl Florence and expectant mother Fannie, return home. Florence is preparing to swim the English Channel, a dangerous venture that requires that she spend the summer training, and Fannie must remain on bed rest lest she run the risk of miscarriage. Joseph has also brought home a young Jewish woman that he helped emigrate from Nazi Germany, which makes the apartment even more crowded. After Florence dies during a swimming accident Esther convinces the family to hide the truth from Fannie out of fear that she would lose the baby. This proves to be a difficult venture and one that brings out much family tension and many secrets.

== Development ==
Beanland began writing the novel during a novel writing workshop at Virginia Commonwealth University during 2016; she would later use the first six chapters of the novel for her Master of Fine Arts thesis.

The book's central premise, that a mother would hide the death of a child from their sibling, was derived from the story of her great-aunt Florence Lowenthal's death. Florence died from drowning and while the youngest sibling had known about the death as soon as it happened, the eldest sibling (Beanland's grandmother) was not told because she was in the hospital. Beanland stated that her mother emphasized "what a strong woman Florence’s mother must have been" and as such, that she had been doing the right thing. Beanland wondered "What if Florence’s sister — my great-grandmother — had wanted to know her sister had died." She was initially nervous to have her mother and grandmother read the story; her grandmother died before the novel was completed but had stated that she was fine with the novel's premise. Beanland's mother read one of the novel's drafts and while she initially had some trouble separating some of the characters from their real life counterparts, "two-thirds of the way through she was able to let go of the real people and embrace the characters. When she finished the book she called me in tears and said it was lovely."

The professor teaching the workshop, Tom De Haven, introduced Beanland to an agent with Janklow & Nesbit Associates. After several drafts were completed, the agent shopped the final draft to several publishing houses. They eventually chose to sell the book to Simon & Schuster in January 2019.

== Publication ==
Florence Adler Swims Forever was first published in hardback and ebook format on July 7, 2020, through Simon & Schuster. An audiobook adaptation was released through Simon & Schuster Audio and is narrated by the ensemble cast of Jonathan Davis, Tim Paige, Carly Robins, Jonathan Todd Ross, Tara Sands, Jesse Vilinsky, Gabra Zackman, and the author, Rachel Beanland.

== Reception ==
Critical reception was largely positive and common elements of praise centered around the book's handling of tragedy and family drama. A reviewer for the Jewish Book Council praised the accuracy of Beanland's depiction of a Jew trying to flee pre-war Germany and for being one of "not many stories depicting Jewish immigrants already living for a generation in America in 1934". The New York Times's Allegra Goodman noted that while the book had some limitations, "Beanland’s novel draws the reader in. The situation she describes is poignant and the characters she develops win us over with their private grief."
