= Charles Henry Brownlow =

British Indian Army general

Field Marshal Sir Charles Brownlow GCB
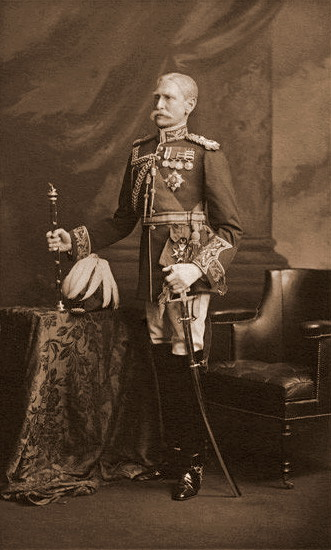
- Field Marshal Sir Charles Brownlow c.1900
- Born: 12 December 1831; Sultanpur, Bengal
- Died: 5 April 1916 (aged 84); Warfield, Berkshire
- Military career
- Allegiance: United Kingdom
- Branch: British Indian Army
- Service years: 1847–1890
- Rank: Field Marshal
- Commands: 8th Regiment of Punjab Infantry
- Conflicts: Hazara Campaign of 1853; Mohmand Campaign; Indian Mutiny; Second Opium War; Ambela Campaign; Hazara Campaign of 1868; Lushai Expedition
- Awards: Knight Grand Cross of the Order of the Bath; Mentioned in Despatches

Field Marshal Sir Charles Henry Brownlow, GCB (12 December 1831 – 5 April 1916) was a senior Indian Army officer. He served on the North West Frontier in the Hazara Campaign of 1853 and the campaign against the Mohmands in 1854. At the start of the Indian Mutiny, Brownlow was asked to raise an infantry regiment and formed the 8th Punjab Infantry which he commanded during that campaign, the Second Opium War, the Ambela Campaign and the Hazara Campaign of 1868. He commanded a column for the Lushai Expedition and then served as Assistant Military Secretary for India for ten years. After his retirement, as senior retired officer of the Indian Army, he was promoted to field marshal.

== Military career ==
Born the son of George Arthur Brownlow and Cornelia Paulina Henrietta Brownlow (née Sandby), Brownlow was commissioned into the Bengal Army on 20 December 1847. He became Adjutant of the 1st Sikh Infantry, a unit formed to defend the North West Frontier, in 1851 and, having been promoted to lieutenant on 10 September 1852, he fought in the Hazara Campaign of 1853 and was mentioned in despatches. He also fought in the campaign against the Mohmands in 1854 when he was wounded and again mentioned in despatches.

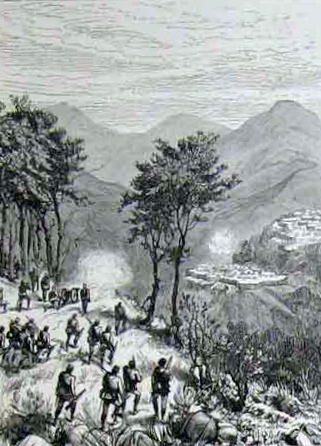
The Lushai Expedition, for which Brownlow commanded the Right (or Chittagong) Column in 1871

In 1857, in response to the Indian Mutiny, Brownlow was asked to raise an infantry regiment and formed the 8th Punjab Infantry. During the fighting he remained on the front line in command of his regiment. After taking part in the Yusafzai expedition, like other officers at the time, he obtained a commission in the British Indian Army in August 1858. Promoted to captain on 3 November 1858, he was present at the Battle of the Taku Forts in August 1860 and the subsequent occupation of Peking during the Second Opium War. He joined the Bengal Staff Corps in January 1861 and, following promotion to brevet major on 15 February 1861, he led his regiment at the Battle of Crag Piquet in November 1863 during the Ambela Campaign. He was appointed a Companion of the Order of the Bath on 5 August 1864.

Promoted to brevet lieutenant colonel on 5 August 1864 and substantive major on 20 December 1867, Brownlow commanded his regiment during the Hazara Campaign in 1868. Promoted to colonel on 11 August 1869 and appointed aide-de-camp to the Queen on 30 October 1869, he commanded the Right (or Chittagong) Column for the Lushai Expedition in 1871. After being given command of a brigade at Rawalpindi, he was advanced to Knight Commander of the Order of the Bath on 10 September 1872. He returned to England in 1877 and became Assistant Military Secretary for India in 1879. He was promoted to major-general on 1 July 1881, promoted to lieutenant-general on 7 September 1884 and advanced to Knight Grand Cross of the Order of the Bath 5 January 1888. He was promoted again to full general on 22 January 1889 before retiring in 1890.

Brownlow became colonel of the 20th Duke of Cambridge's Own Infantry (Brownlow's Punjabis) in May 1904 and, as senior retired officer of the Indian Army, he was promoted to field marshal on 20 June 1908. He lived at Warfield Hall at Warfield in Berkshire; he died there on 5 April 1916 and was buried at St Michael the Archangel Churchyard in Warfield.

== Family ==
In 1890 he married Georgina King; they had no children.

== See also ==
- Brownlow KI, South Australia

== Sources ==
- Heathcote, Tony (1999). The British Field Marshals 1736–1997. Barnsley (UK): Pen & Sword. ISBN 0-85052-696-5.
